= Multan Division =

Coordinates: 30°00′N 71°40′E

- Division
- Map of Multan Division
- Country: Pakistan
- Province: (Punjab, Pakistan) Punjab
- Capital: Multan

Government
  - Type: Divisional Administration
  - Commissioner: Amir Kareem Khan (PAS)
  - Regional Police Officer: N/A

Area
  - Division: 17,935 km^{2} (6,925 sq mi)

Population (2023)
  - Division: 14,085,102
  - Density: 785.34/km^{2} (2,034.0/sq mi)
  - Urban: 4,324,625 (30.70%)
  - Rural: 9,760,477

Literacy
  - Literacy rate: Total: (69.43%); Male: (76.65%); Female: (61.87%)
- Website: multandivision.punjab.gov.pk

Multan Division is an administrative division of Punjab Province, Pakistan. It was created during British colonial rule in South Asia in the 19th century. It includes 4 districts: Khanewal, Lodhran, Vehari and Multan and 14 Tehsils. Its recorded population was just over 1.40 crores in 2023.

== History ==
Multan Division was created during the British colonial rule in South Asia. During early British rule Multan division included Lyallpur (Faisalabad), Jhang, Montgomery (Sahiwal) and all the districts that later formed Dera Ghazi Khan Division. In 1982 new Dera Ghazi Khan Division was formed. Sahiwal region was part of the division till 2008 when a separate Sahiwal division was created.

The division laid between 28°25' and 33°13 N and 69°19' and 73°39 E, the Sutlej divided it from Bahawalpur on the south-east, while the Indus river flowed partly through the Division and partly along its border to the west. The headquarters of the Commissioner were at Multan (or in the hot season, at the hill station of Fort Munro). The Division was abolished in 1884, but reconstituted in 1901.

According to the 1881 census of India the population of the area now included was 2,036,956; in 1891 it had risen to 2,277,605, and in 1901 to 3,014,675 and the total area was 76,500 kilometres square.

== Demographics ==
=== Population ===
Historical population
| Year | Pop. | ±% p.a. |
|---|---|---|
| 1951 | N/A | — |
| 1961 | N/A | — |
| 1972 | N/A | — |
| 1981 | N/A | — |
| 1998 | 8,447,557 | — |
| 2017 | 12,265,161 | +1.98% |
| 2023 | 14,085,102 | +2.33% |

According to the 2023 census, Multan division had a population of 14,085,102 roughly equal to the country of Tanzania or the combine population of US states of Michigan and Indiana.

== Districts ==
| # | District | Headquarter | Area (km^{2}) | Pop. (2023) | Density (ppl/km^{2}) (2023) | Lit. rate (2023) |
|---|---|---|---|---|---|---|
| 1 | Khanewal | Khanewal | 4,349 | 3,364,077 | 774.3 | 60.97% |
| 2 | Vehari | Vehari | 4,364 | 3,430,421 | 787.7 | 59.10% |
| 3 | Multan | Multan | 3,720 | 5,362,305 | 1,441.1 | 61.41% |
| 4 | Lodhran | Lodhran | 2,778 | 1,928,299 | 693.5 | 51.68% |

== Tehsils ==
| # | Tehsil | Area (km^{2}) | Pop. (2023) | Density (ppl/km^{2}) (2023) | Lit. rate (2023) | Districts |
|---|---|---|---|---|---|---|
| 1 | Jahanian | 549 | 384,822 | 700.95 | 65.65% | Khanewal District |
| 2 | Kabirwala | 1,804 | 1,119,229 | 620.42 | 54.13% | Khanewal District |
| 3 | Khanewal | 784 | 987,445 | 1,259.50 | 63.60% | Khanewal District |
| 4 | Mian Channu | 1,212 | 872,581 | 719.95 | 64.39% | Khanewal District |
| 5 | Dunyapur | 889 | 571,333 | 642.67 | 55.66% | Lodhran District |
| 6 | Kahror Pacca | 778 | 547,761 | 704.06 | 49.81% | Lodhran District |
| 7 | Lodhran | 1,111 | 809,205 | 728.36 | 50.10% | Lodhran District |
| 8 | Jalalpur Pirwala | 978 | 608,488 | 622.18 | 38.50% | Multan District |
| 9 | Multan City | 304 | 2,555,486 | 8,406.20 | 73.65% | Multan District |
| 10 | Multan Saddar | 1,632 | 1,516,004 | 928.92 | 52.01% | Multan District |
| 11 | Shujabad | 806 | 682,327 | 846.56 | 53.87% | Multan District |
| 12 | Burewala | 1295 | 1204,225 | 929.93 | 63.98% | Vehari District |
| 13 | Mailsi | 1639 | 1,120,407 | 683.59 | 54.63% | Vehari District |
| 14 | Vehari | 1,430 | 1,105,759 | 773.26 | 58.21% | Vehari District |

== Constituencies ==
| Provincial Assembly Constituency | National Assembly Constituency | District |
|---|---|---|
| PP-205 Khanewal-I | NA-144 Khanewal-I | Khanewal |
| PP-212 Khanewal-VIII | NA-144 Khanewal-I | Khanewal |
| PP-206 Khanewal-II | NA-145 Khanewal-II | Khanewal |
| PP-211 Khanewal-VII | NA-145 Khanewal-II | Khanewal |
| PP-207 Khanewal-III | NA-146 Khanewal-III | Khanewal |
| PP-208 Khanewal-IV | NA-146 Khanewal-III | Khanewal |
| PP-209 Khanewal-V | NA-147 Khanewal-IV | Khanewal |
| PP-210 Khanewal-VI | NA-147 Khanewal-IV | Khanewal |
| PP-213 Multan-I | NA-148 Multan-I | Multan |
| PP-214 Multan-II | NA-148 Multan-I | Multan |
| PP-215 Multan-III | NA-149 Multan-II | Multan |
| PP-216 Multan-IV | NA-149 Multan-II | Multan |
| PP-217 Multan-V | NA-150 Multan-III | Multan |
| PP-218 Multan-VI | NA-150 Multan-III | Multan |
| PP-219 Multan-VII | NA-151 Multan-IV | Multan |
| PP-220 Multan-VIII | NA-151 Multan-IV | Multan |
| PP-221 Multan-IX | NA-152 Multan-V | Multan |
| PP-222 Multan-X | NA-152 Multan-V | Multan |
| PP-223 Multan-XI | NA-153 Multan-VI | Multan |
| PP-224 Multan-XII | NA-153 Multan-VI | Multan |
| PP-225 Lodhran-I | NA-154 Lodhran-I | Lodhran |
| PP-226 Lodhran-II | NA-154 Lodhran-I | Lodhran |
| PP-227 Lodhran-III | NA-155 Lodhran-II | Lodhran |
| PP-228 Lodhran-IV | NA-155 Lodhran-II | Lodhran |
| PP-229 Vehari-I | NA-156 Vehari-I | Vehari |
| PP-231 Vehari-III | NA-156 Vehari-I | Vehari |
| PP-230 Vehari-II | NA-157 Vehari-II | Vehari |
| PP-232 Vehari-IV | NA-157 Vehari-II | Vehari |
| PP-233 Vehari-V | NA-158 Vehari-III | Vehari |
| PP-234 Vehari-VI | NA-158 Vehari-III | Vehari |
| PP-235 Vehari-VII | NA-159 Vehari-IV | Vehari |
| PP-236 Vehari-VIII | NA-159 Vehari-IV | Vehari |

== Notable people ==
- Yousuf Raza Gilani (Prime Minister of Pakistan)
- Rafique Rajwana (Governor of Punjab)
- Shah Mehmood Qureshi (Foreign Minister of Pakistan)
- Javed Hashmi (Senior Politician)
- Inzamam ul Haq (Cricketer)
- Waqar Younis (Cricketer)

== See also ==
- Divisions of Pakistan
  - Divisions of Balochistan
  - Divisions of Khyber Pakhtunkhwa
  - Divisions of Punjab, Pakistan
  - Divisions of Sindh
  - Divisions of Azad Kashmir
  - Divisions of Gilgit-Baltistan
