= Jalalpur Pirwala =

Town in Multan District, Punjab, Pakistan

Jalalpur Pirwala جلالپُور پِيروالا
- City
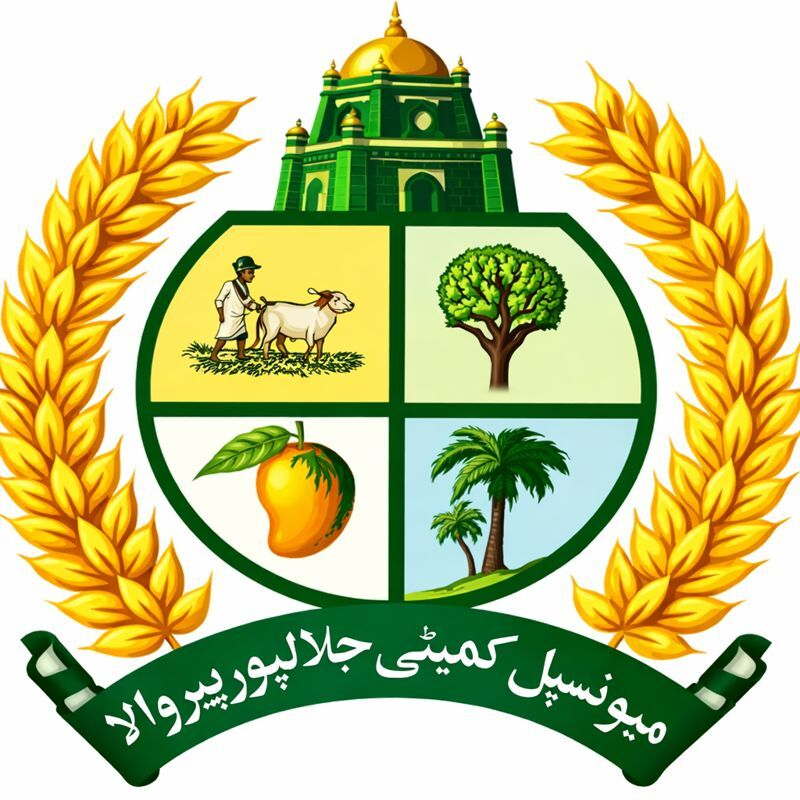
- Nickname: "JPPW" or "JP"
- Location in Pakistan
- Coordinates: 29°30′11″N 71°13′00″E
- Country: Pakistan
- Province: Punjab Pakistan
- District: Multan District
- Number of Union councils: 15

Government
  - Type: Municipal Committee
  - Chairman: Mudassir Mumtaz Herl
  - MNA: Rana Muhammad Qasim Noon (NA-159)
  - MPA: Muhammad Nazik Kareem
  - MPA: Malik Lal Muhammad
- Elevation: 101 m (331 ft)

Population (2023 Census of Pakistan)
  - City: 89,679
- Demonym: Jalalpuri
- Time zone: UTC+5 (PST)
- postal code: 59250

Jalalpur Pirwala (Urdu: جلالپُور پِيروالا) is a city and the capital of Jalalpur Pirwala Tehsil, Multan District, Pakistan.

This city is about 90 km south of Multan city. Jalalpur Pirwala is a historical city, and it was named after a famous Sufi saint Jalaluddin Surkh-Posh Bukhari. .

The city, also known as the City of Peer Qatal, has a strong agricultural background, although it also possesses some industrial resources. The primary sources of income in the area are agriculture and trade. A reliable income in International trade is due to many people working abroad. The economic remittances from overseas migrants living in countries like Saudi Arabia, United Arab Emirates, Oman, Qatar, the United States, and the United Kingdom have also been considered great support for their families living here. There are 15 union councils in Jalalpur Pirwala tehsil. Jalalpur Pirwala is now part of CPEC (China–Pakistan Economic Corridor) via Lahore-Karachi Motorway.

== Demographics ==
Population

Historical population
Year	Pop.	±%
1972	12,140	—
1981	15,864	+30.7%
1998	32,219	+103.1%
2017	67,453	+109.4%
2023	89,679	+33.0%

According to the 2023 census, Jalalpur Piwala city had a population of 89,679.

== Flood 2025 ==
Jalalpur Piwala is the most affected city in Pakistan during the 2025 Pakistan Floods. The M5 motorway got damaged on all six lanes.

== Notable residents ==
- Naghma Mushtaq Lang, is a politician, Ex. provincial minister and thrice elected member of the Provincial Assembly of the Punjab
- Syed Ashiq Hussain Bukhari, is a politician and Ex Member of Punjab & National Assembly of Pakistan.
- Muhammad Nazik Kareem, is the current MPA from PP-223, Jalalpur Pirwala. He is the youngest MPA in Provincial Assembly of the Punjab.

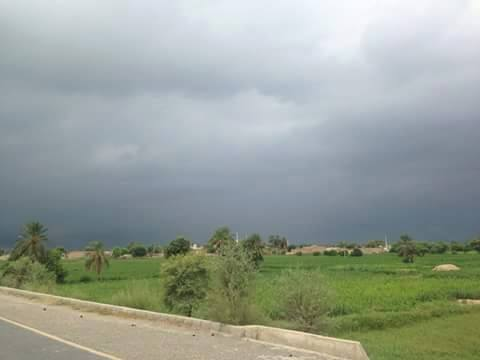
Agriculture in Jalalpur Pirwala

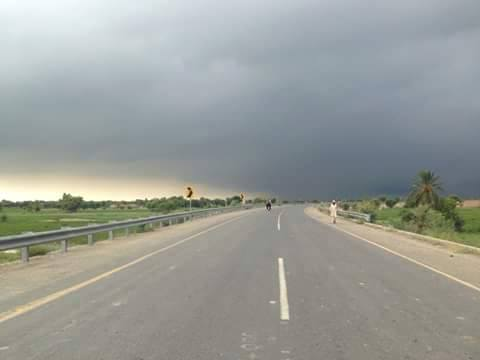
Bypass of Jalalpur Pirwala
