= Naghma Mushtaq =

Pakistani politician

Naghma Mushtaq Lang

Member of the Provincial Assembly of the Punjab
- In office 15 August 2018 – 14 January 2023
- Constituency: PP-223 Multan-XIII
- In office 29 May 2013 – 31 May 2018
- Constituency: PP-206 (Multan-XIII)
- In office 2008 – April 2010
- Constituency: PP-206 (Multan-XIII)

Minister of the Provincial Assembly of the Punjab
- In office November 2016 – May 2018

Personal details
- Born: 1968 (age 57–58) Jalalpur Pirwala, Multan
- Party: PMLN (2013-present)
- Other political affiliations: PMLQ (2008-2013)
- Spouse: Malik Mushtaq Ahmed Lang
- Children: Muhammad Nazik Kareem Lang

Punjab Assembly Lahore

Naghma Mushtaq Lang (Urdu: نغمہ مشتاق لانگ; born 1968) is a Pakistani politician and ex-minister Punjab who had been a member of the Provincial Assembly of the Punjab from August 2018 till January 2023. Previously, she was a member of the Punjab Assembly from 2008 to 2010 and again from May 2013 to May 2018. She is the mother of MPA Muhammad Nazik Kareem.

== Early life ==
Lang was born in 1968. She is married to a former member of Provincial Assembly of the Punjab and former Tehsil Nazim of Jalalpur Pirwala Malik Mushtaq Ahmed Lang.

== Political career ==
Naghma Mushtaq Lang was elected to the Provincial Assembly of the Punjab as a candidate of Pakistan Muslim League (Q) (PML-Q) from Constituency PP-206 (Multan-XIII) in the 2008 Pakistani general election. She received 28,109 votes and defeated a candidate of Pakistan Peoples Party (PPP). She resigned from her Punjab Assembly seat in April 2010 after her graduation degree was challenged.

She was re-elected to the Provincial Assembly of the Punjab as a candidate of Pakistan Muslim League (N) (PML-N) from Constituency PP-206 (Multan-XIII) in the 2013 Pakistani general election. She received 43,228 votes and defeated Malik Muhammad Akram Kahnu, a candidate of PPP.

In December 2013, she was appointed the Parliamentary Secretary for population welfare.

In November 2016, she was inducted into the provincial Punjab cabinet of Chief Minister Shehbaz Sharif and was made Provincial Minister of Punjab for Zakat and Ushr.

She was re-elected to the Provincial Assembly of the Punjab as a candidate of PML-N from Constituency PP-223 (Multan-XIII) in the 2018 Pakistani general election.
