= PP-214 Multan-II =

Constituency of the Punjabi Provincial Legislature, Pakistan

- Constituency for the Provincial Assembly of Punjab
- Region: Multan Saddar Tehsil (partly) including Multan Cantonment and some western parts of Multan city of Multan District

Current constituency
- Created from: PP-199 Multan-VI (2002-2018); PP-212 Multan-II (2018-2023)

PP-214 Multan-II (پی پی-214، ملتان-2) is a Constituency of Provincial Assembly of Punjab.

== General elections 2024 ==
Provincial election 2024: PP-214 Multan-II
Party	Candidate	Votes	%	±%
Independent	Nawabzada Waseem Khan Badozai (Note: Filed nomination papers as PTI candidate but ECP allowed him to run as an Independent)	44,946	41.93	
PML(N)	Main Shahzad Maqbool Bhutta	26,013	24.27	
PPP	Syed Muddsar Ali Naqvi	21,281	19.85	
TLP	Muhammad Ehsan Ullah	6,808	6.35	
JI	Sagheer Ahmad	2,714	2.53	
Others	Others (twenty four candidates)	5,425	5.07	
Turnout		109,207	51.19	
Total valid votes		107,187	98.15	
Rejected ballots		2,020	1.85	
Majority		18,933	17.66	
Registered electors		213,333		
hold				

== General elections 2018 ==
Provincial election 2018: PP-212 Multan-II
Party	Candidate	Votes	%	±%
PTI	Muhammad Saleem Akhtar	26,066	27.16	
PPP	Nazim Ali Almaroof Nazim Hussain	21,875	22.79	
PML(N)	Mian Shahzad Maqbool Bhutta	20,104	20.94	
Independent	Tahir Anmed Asgher Khokhar	11,827	12.32	
TLP	Muhammad Aslam	4,232	4.41	
Independent	Makhdoom Syed Muhammad Sher Ali Shah	4,051	4.22	
Independent	Pirzada Mian Saqlain Raza	2,399	2.50	
Independent	Syed Muhammad Asgher Hussain Shah	1,638	1.71	
Independent	Muhammad Arshad	1,294	1.35	
Others	Others (seven candidates)	2,503	2.61	
Turnout		98,422	55.60	
Total valid votes		95,989	97.53	
Rejected ballots		2,433	2.47	
Majority		4,191	4.37	
Registered electors		177,020		

== General elections 2013 ==
Provincial election 2013: PP-199 Multan-VI
Party	Candidate	Votes	%	±%
PML(N)	Malik Muhammad Ali Khokhar	35,817	38.14	
PTI	Tahir Ahmed Asghar Khokhar	26,593	28.32	
PPP	Syed Nazam Hussain Shah	25,518	27.17	
JI	Chaudhary Zafar Iqbal Arain	2,137	2.28	
Independent	Sheikh Muhammad Younis	1,332	1.42	
Others	Others (seven candidates)	2,512	2.67	
Turnout		95,933	51.95	
Total valid votes		93,909	97.89	
Rejected ballots		2,024	2.11	
Majority		9,224	9.82	
Registered electors		184,674		

== General elections 2008 ==
Contesting candidates	Party affiliation	Votes polled

== See also ==
- PP-213 Multan-I
- PP-215 Multan-III
