= NA-152 Multan-V =

Constituency of the National Assembly of Pakistan

- Constituency for the National Assembly of Pakistan
- Region: Shujabad Tehsil (partly) including Shujabad and Multan Saddar Tehsil (partly) of Multan District
- Electorate: 262,275

Current constituency
- Party: Pakistan People's Party
- Member: Abdul Qadir Gillani
- Created from: NA-158 Multan-V

NA-152 Multan-V (این اے-152، ملتان-5) is a constituency for the National Assembly of Pakistan.

== Election 2002 ==
General elections were held on 10 October 2002. Syed Asad Murtaza Gillani of PPP won by 38,027 votes.

General election 2002: NA-152 Multan-V
Party	Candidate	Votes	%	±%
PPP	Assad Murtaza Gilani	38,027	32.58	
PML(N)	Syed Javed Ali Shah	36,870	31.59	
PML(Q)	Nawab Liaquat Ali Khan	36,335	31.13	
MMA	Muhammad Iqbal Azhari	5,478	4.70	
Turnout		118,853	42.52	
Total valid votes		116,710	98.20	
Rejected ballots		2,143	1.80	
Majority		1,157	0.99	
Registered electors		279,550		

== Election 2008 ==
General elections were held on 18 February 2008. Liaquat Ali Khan of PPP won by 47,880 votes.

General election 2008: NA-152 Multan-V
Party	Candidate	Votes	%	±%
PPP	Liaqat Ali Khan	47,880	35.44	
PML(Q)	Syed Mujahid Ali Shah	38,126	28.22	
Independent	Muhammad Ibrahim Khan	36,136	26.75	
PML(N)	Assad Murtaza Gilani	11,923	8.83	
Others	Others (three candidates)	1,027	0.76	
Turnout		138,691	41.27	
Total valid votes		135,092	97.41	
Rejected ballots		3,599	2.59	
Majority		9,754	7.22	
Registered electors		336,035		
PPP hold				

== Election 2013 ==
General elections were held on 11 May 2013. Syed Javed Ali Shah of PML-N won by 81,015 votes and became the member of National Assembly.

General election 2013: NA-152 Multan-V
Party	Candidate	Votes	%	±%
PML(N)	Syed Javed Ali Shah	81,015	42.39	
PTI	Muhammad Ibraheem Khan	64,611	33.81	
PPP	Syed Ahmad Mujtaba Gillani	32,514	17.01	
Others	Others (twelve candidates)	12,973	6.79	
Turnout		194,762	58.50	
Total valid votes		191,113	98.13	
Rejected ballots		3,649	1.87	
Majority		16,404	8.58	
Registered electors		332,921		
PML(N) gain from PPP				

== Election 2018 ==
General elections were held on 25 July 2018.

General election 2018: NA-158 Multan-V
Party	Candidate	Votes	%	±%
PTI	Ibrahim Khan	83,304	34.43	
PPP	Yusuf Raza Gillani	74,443	30.76	
PML(N)	Syed Javed Ali Shah	73,218	30.26	
Pakistan Siraiki Party (T)	Allah Nawaz	4,708	1.95	
Others	Others (three candidates)	6,312	2.61	
Turnout		247,675	56.76	
Total valid votes		241,985	97.70	
Rejected ballots		5,690	2.30	
Majority		8,861	3.66	
Registered electors		436,391		
PTI gain from PML(N)				

== Election 2024 ==
General elections were held on 8 February 2024. Abdul Qadir Gillani won the election with 97,065 votes.

General election 2024: NA-152 Multan-V
Party	Candidate	Votes	%	±%
PPP	Abdul Qadir Gillani	97,065	36.69	▲5.93
PML(N)	Syed Javed Ali Shah	71,376	30.26	▼3.28
PTI	Muhammad Imran Shaukat Khan (Note: Filed nomination papers as PTI candidate but ECP allowed him to run as an Independent)	62,166	23.50	▼10.93
Others	Others (thirteen candidates)	33,973	12.84	
Turnout		271,154	51.41	▼5.35
Total valid votes		264,580	97.58	
Rejected ballots		6,574	2.42	
Majority		25,689	9.71	
Registered electors		527,410		
PPP gain from PTI				

== See also ==
- NA-151 Multan-IV
- NA-153 Multan-VI
