= NA-153 Multan-VI =

Constituency of the National Assembly of Pakistan

- Constituency for the National Assembly of Pakistan
- Region: Shujabad Tehsil (partly) and Jalalpur Pirwala Tehsil of Multan District
- Electorate: 260,385

Current constituency
- Party: Pakistan Muslim League (N)
- Member: Rana Muhammad Qasim Noon
- Created from: NA-153 Multan-VI

NA-153 Multan-VI (این اے-153، ملتان-6) is a constituency for the National Assembly of Pakistan.

== Election 2002 ==
General elections were held on 10 October 2002. Deewan Jaffer Hussain Bukhari of PML-N won by 57,207 votes.

General election 2002: NA-153 Multan-VI
Party	Candidate	Votes	%	±%
PML(N)	Deewan Jaffer Hussain Bukhari	57,209	41.07	
PML(Q)	Rana Muhammad Qasim Noon	55,395	39.77	
PPP	Syed Najaf Hussain Shah	24,560	17.63	
Others	Others (two candidates)	2,129	1.53	
Turnout		142,116	47.14	
Total valid votes		139,293	98.01	
Rejected ballots		2,823	1.99	
Majority		1,814	1.30	
Registered electors		301,449		

== Election 2008 ==
General elections were held on 18 February 2008. Syed Ashiq Hussain Bukhari of PML-Q won by 69,246 votes.

General election 2008: NA-153 Multan-VI
Party	Candidate	Votes	%	±%
PML(Q)	Syed Ashiq Hussain Bukhari	69,246	43.77	
Independent	Rana Muhammad Qasim Noon	68,762	43.46	
PPP	Dewan Syed Muhammad Haider Abbas	16,875	10.67	
PML(N)	Dewan Syed Jaffar Hussain	3,334	2.11	
Turnout		164,488	46.91	
Total valid votes		158,217	96.19	
Rejected ballots		6,271	3.81	
Majority		484	0.31	
Registered electors		350,676		
PML(Q) gain from PML(N)				

== Election 2013 ==
General elections were held on 11 May 2013. Syed Ashiq Hussain Bukhari of PML-N won by 94,298 votes and became the member of National Assembly.

General election 2013: NA-153 Multan-VI
Party	Candidate	Votes	%	±%
PML(N)	Syed Ashiq Hussain Bukhari	94,413	44.70	
PPP	Rana Muhammad Qasim Noon	90,179	42.69	
PTI	Saeed Khursheed Ahmad	18,155	8.60	
Others	Others (ten candidates)	8,482	4.01	
Turnout		216,603	61.94	
Total valid votes		211,229	97.52	
Rejected ballots		5,374	2.48	
Majority		4,234	2.01	
Registered electors		349,714		
PML(N) hold				

== By-election 2016 ==
A by-election was held on 17 March 2016 due to the disqualification of Syed Ashiq Hussain Bukhari, the previous MNA from this seat.

By-election 2016: NA-153 Multan-VII
Party	Candidate	Votes	%	±%
PML(N)	Rana Muhammad Qasim Noon	109,499	59.45	
PTI	Malik Ghulam Abbas	34,451	18.70	
PPP	Malik Muhammad Akram Kinhon	31,354	16.91	
Others	Others (eight candidates)	8,890	4.83	
Turnout		184,194	48.48	
Majority		75,048	40.74	
Registered electors		379,962		
PML(N) hold				

== Election 2018 ==
General elections were held on 25 July 2018.

General election 2018: NA-159 Multan-VI
Party	Candidate	Votes	%	±%
PTI	Rana Muhammad Qasim Noon	102,754	45.26	
PML(N)	Dewan Muhammad Zulqarnain Bukhari	99,477	43.82	
Others	Others (eleven candidates)	24,806	10.93	
Turnout		233,682	56.55	
Total valid votes		227,037	97.16	
Rejected ballots		6,628	2.84	
Majority		3,232	1.42	
Registered electors		413,257		
PTI gain from PML(N)				

== Election 2024 ==
General elections were held on 8 February 2024. Rana Muhammad Qasim Noon won the election with 95,202 votes.

General election 2024: NA-153 Multan-VI
Party	Candidate	Votes	%	±%
PML(N)	Rana Muhammad Qasim Noon	95,202	34.91	▼8.91
Independent	Syed Ashiq Hussain Bukhari	49,104	18.01	
Independent	Qasim Abbas Khan	47,881	17.56	
PTI	Riaz Hussain Laang (Note: Filed nomination papers as PTI candidate but ECP allowed him to run as an Independent)	39,694	14.56	▼30.70
PPP	Hamid Ali	17,628	6.46	
TLP	Syed Shahid Zahoor Gilani	10,532	3.86	▲1.20
Others	Others (thirteen candidates)	12,632	4.63	
Turnout		281,160	52.08	▼4.47
Total valid votes		272,673	96.98	
Rejected ballots		8,487	3.02	
Majority		46,098	16.91	
Registered electors		539,850		
PML(N) gain from PTI				

== See also ==
- NA-152 Multan-V
- NA-154 Lodhran-I
