= PP-221 Multan-IX =

Constituency of the Punjabi Provincial Legislature, Pakistan

- Constituency for the Provincial Assembly of Punjab
- Region: Multan Saddar Tehsil (partly) including Sher Shah town of Multan District

Current constituency
- Created from: PP-203 Multan-X (2002-2018); PP-220 Multan-X (2018-2023)

PP-221 Multan-IX (پی پی-221، ملتان-9) is a Constituency of Provincial Assembly of Punjab.

== General elections 2024 ==
Provincial election 2024: PP-221 Multan-IX
Party	Candidate	Votes	%	±%
PPP	Mian Kamran Muhammad Abdullah	43,148	31.73	
Independent	Makhdoom Syed Muhammad Amir Abbas (Note: Filed nomination papers as PTI candidate but ECP allowed him to run as an Independent)	32,895	24.19	
IPP	Mian Tariq Abdullah	24,897	18.31	
Independent	Mujeeb Ahmad	15,921	11.71	
TLP	Muhammad Abdullah Qayyum Rao	8,848	6.51	
Independent	Raouf Shabbir	2,262	1.66	
Independent	Muhammad Asif Shahzad	2,133	1.57	
Others	Others (fifteen candidates)	5,863	4.32	
Turnout		139,738	52.70	
Total valid votes		135,967	97.30	
Rejected ballots		3,771	2.70	
Majority		10,253	7.54	
Registered electors		265,135		
hold				

== General elections 2018 ==
Provincial election 2018: PP-220 Multan-X
Party	Candidate	Votes	%	±%
PTI	Mian Tariq Abdullah	33,628	31.30	
PPP	Mian Kamran Muhammad Abdullah	32,875	30.60	
PML(N)	Rana Tahir Shabbir	27,157	25.28	
TLP	Syed Ghulam Shabbir Shah	5,704	5.34	
Independent	Ghulam Yasin	3,673	3.42	
Independent	Syed Mujahid Ali Shah	1,793	1.67	
Others	Others (seven candidates)	2,601	2.42	
Turnout		110,019	57.76	
Total valid votes		107,431	97.65	
Rejected ballots		2,588	2.35	
Majority		753	0.70	
Registered electors		190,466		

== General elections 2013 ==
Provincial election 2013: PP-203 Multan-X
Party	Candidate	Votes	%	±%
PML(N)	Rana Tahir Shabbir	30,396	33.80	
PTI	Mian Tariq Abdullah	22,073	24.54	
PPP	Mian Kamran Muhammad Abdullah Maral	14,718	16.37	
Independent	Sheikh Aamir Khalil	8,394	9.33	
Independent	Muhammad Irfan Iqbal	7,145	7.95	
Independent	Muhammad Aamir Ghani Maral	4,177	4.64	
Others	Others (fourteen candidates)	3,027	3.37	
Turnout		92,460	58.62	
Total valid votes		89,930	97.26	
Rejected ballots		2,530	2.74	
Majority		8,323	9.26	
Registered electors		157,741		

== General elections 2008 ==
Contesting candidates	Party affiliation	Votes polled

== See also ==
- PP-220 Multan-VIII
- PP-222 Multan-X
