= Javed Akhtar Ansari =

Pakistani politician

Member of the Provincial Assembly of the Punjab
- In office 15 August 2018 – 14 January 2023
- Constituency: PP-215 Multan-V
- In office 29 May 2013 – 31 May 2018
- Constituency: PP-195 Multan-II

Personal details
- Born: 1 January 1963 (age 63) Multan, Punjab, Pakistan
- Party: PART (2026-present)
- Other political affiliations: PMLN (2023-2026); PTI (2013-2023)

Javed Akhtar Ansari is a Pakistani politician who was a Member of the Provincial Assembly of the Punjab, from May 2013 to May 2018 and from August 2018 to January 2023.

== Early life ==
He was born on 1 January 1963 in Multan.

== Political career ==
He was elected to the Provincial Assembly of the Punjab as a candidate of the Pakistan Tehreek-e-Insaf (PTI) from PP-195 (Multan-II) in the 2013 Punjab provincial election.

He was re-elected to Provincial Assembly of the Punjab as a candidate of the PTI from PP-215 (Multan-V) in the 2018 Punjab provincial election.

He ran for a seat in the Provincial Assembly from PP-215 Multan-V as a candidate of the PMLN in the 2024 Punjab provincial election.
