= PP-224 Multan-XII =

Constituency of the Punjabi Provincial Legislature, Pakistan

- Constituency for the Provincial Assembly of Punjab
- Region: Jalalpur Pirwala Tehsil (partly) including Jalalpur Pirwala city of Multan District

Current constituency
- Created from: PP-206 Multan-XIII (2002-2018); PP-223 Multan-XIII (2018-2023)

PP-224 Multan-XII (پی پی-224، ملتان-12) is a Constituency of Provincial Assembly of Punjab.

== General elections 2024 ==
Provincial election 2024: PP-224 Multan-XII
Party	Candidate	Votes	%	±%
PML(N)	Malik Lal Muhammad	44,301	34.53	
Independent	Mohammad Abbas Bokhari	28,485	22.20	
Independent	Malik Muhammad Akram Kanhoon	18,672	14.55	
Independent	Muhammad Ayub Khan Ghallu	10,072	7.85	
Independent	Muhammad Arshad (Note: Filed nomination papers as PTI candidate but ECP allowed him to run as an Independent)	9,534	7.43	
PPP	Umar Farooq	5,122	3.99	
TLP	Muhammad Siddique	4,157	3.24	
Independent	Shahid Abbas	3,122	2.43	
Others	Others (eleven candidates)	4,852	3.78	
Turnout		131,756	50.60	
Total valid votes		128,317	97.39	
Rejected ballots		3,439	2.61	
Majority		15,816	12.33	
Registered electors		260,385		
hold				

== General elections 2018 ==
Provincial election 2018: PP-223 Multan-XIII
Party	Candidate	Votes	%	±%
PML(N)	Naghma Mushtaq	46,935	43.97	
PTI	Malik Muhammad Akram Kanhon	44,588	41.77	
PPP	Hamid Ali	6,134	5.75	
Independent	Malik Muhammad Aslam	3,839	3.60	
TLP	Elahi Bukhsh	2,216	2.08	
ARP	Rana Ghazanfar Ali Pehlwan	1,339	1.25	
Others	Others (six candidates)	1,702	1.59	
Turnout		109,605	54.71	
Total valid votes		106,753	97.40	
Rejected ballots		2,852	2.60	
Majority		2,347	2.20	
Registered electors		200,350		

== General elections 2013 ==
Provincial election 2013: PP-206 Multan-XIII
Party	Candidate	Votes	%	±%
PML(N)	Naghma Mushtaq	43,228	43.92	
PPP	Malik Muhammad Akram Kahnu	31,509	32.01	
PTI	Muhammad Ayub Khan Ghallu	10,681	10.85	
Independent	Rana Muhammad Afsar	10,038	10.20	
Independent	Malik Muhammad Aslam	1,163	1.18	
Others	Others (nine candidates)	1,814	1.84	
Turnout		101,388	61.73	
Total valid votes		98,433	97.09	
Rejected ballots		2,955	2.91	
Majority		11,719	11.91	
Registered electors		164,248		

== General elections 2008 ==
Contesting candidates	Party affiliation	Votes polled

== See also ==
- PP-223 Multan-XI
- PP-225 Lodhran-I
