= PP-216 Multan-VI =

Constituency of the Provincial Assembly of Punjab, Pakistan

- Former constituency for the Provincial Assembly of Punjab
- Region: Multan city area including old city in Multan District

Former constituency
- Created: 2002
- Abolished: 2023
- Created from: PP-194 Multan-I (2002-2018); PP-216 Multan-VI (2018-2023)
- Replaced by: PP-217 Multan-V

PP-216 Multan-VI (پی پی-216، ملتان-6) was a Constituency of Provincial Assembly of Punjab. It was abolished after 2023 delimitations when Multan lost 1 seat after 2023 Census

== General elections 2018 ==
Provincial election 2018: PP-216 Multan-VI
| Party | Candidate | Votes | % | ±% |
|---|---|---|---|---|
| PTI | Muhammad Nadeem Qureshi | 56,872 | 45.76 | |
| PML(N) | Muhammad Ahsan Ud Din Qureshi | 44,524 | 35.82 | |
| PPP | Shakeel Hussain | 12,394 | 9.97 | |
| TLP | Hafiz Hasnain Javed | 4,239 | 3.41 | |
| Independent | Abdul Khaliq | 2,350 | 1.89 | |
| AAT | Abdul Ahad Bhutta | 2,171 | 1.75 | |
| Others | Others (five candidates) | 1,746 | 1.41 | |
| Turnout | | 125,904 | 50.53 | |
| Total valid votes | | 124,296 | 98.72 | |
| Rejected ballots | | 1,608 | 1.28 | |
| Majority | | 12,348 | 9.94 | |
| Registered electors | | 249,182 | | |

== General elections 2013 ==
Provincial election 2013: PP-194 Multan-I
| Party | Candidate | Votes | % | ±% |
|---|---|---|---|---|
| PTI | Zaheer Uddin Khan Alizai | 37,174 | 41.80 | |
| PML(N) | Malik Anwar Ali | 29,866 | 33.58 | |
| PPP | Muhammad Usman | 12,611 | 14.18 | |
| Independent | Shahid Mahmood Khan | 6,602 | 7.42 | |
| Others | Others (thirteen candidates) | 2,674 | 3.01 | |
| Turnout | | 89,962 | 53.24 | |
| Total valid votes | | 88,927 | 98.85 | |
| Rejected ballots | | 1,035 | 1.15 | |
| Majority | | 7,308 | 8.22 | |
| Registered electors | | 168,962 | | |

== General elections 2008 ==
| Contesting candidates | Party affiliation | Votes polled |

== See also ==
- PP-215 Multan-V
- PP-217 Multan-VII
