= PP-220 Multan-VIII =

Constituency of the Punjabi Provincial Legislature, Pakistan

- Constituency for the Provincial Assembly of Punjab
- Region: Multan Saddar Tehsil (partly) including Makhdoom Rashid town of Multan District

Current constituency
- Created from: PP-202 Multan-IX (2002-2018); PP-219 Multan-IX (2018-2023)

PP-220 Multan-VIII (پی پی-220، ملتان-8) is a Constituency of Provincial Assembly of Punjab.

== General elections 2024 ==
Provincial election 2024: PP-220 Multan-VIII
Party	Candidate	Votes	%	±%
PPP	Muhammad Iqbal	42,433	35.08	
PML(N)	Rai Mansab Ali Khan	33,273	27.51	
Independent	Zahid Bahar Hashmi (Note: Filed nomination papers as PTI candidate but ECP allowed him to run as an Independent)	29,647	24.51	
TLP	Malik Abdul Ghaffar	7,281	6.02	
JI	Amir Hussain Shah	2,181	1.80	
Others	Others (seventeen candidates)	6,136	5.08	
Turnout		123,434	51.49	
Total valid votes		120,951	97.99	
Rejected ballots		2,484	2.01	
Majority		9,160	7.57	
Registered electors		239,745		
hold				

== General elections 2018 ==
Provincial election 2018: PP-219 Multan-IX
Party	Candidate	Votes	%	±%
PTI	Muhammad Akhtar	39,109	39.88	
PML(N)	Muhammad Iqbal	25,021	25.51	
PPP	Rai Mansab Ali Khan	22,048	22.48	
Independent	Javaid Akram	5,514	5.62	
TLP	Muhammad Shahid	3,309	3.37	
AAT	Muhammad Asif Javaid	1,682	1.72	
Others	Others (five candidates)	1,394	1.43	
Turnout		100,227	57.12	
Total valid votes		98,077	97.86	
Rejected ballots		2,150	2.14	
Majority		14,088	14.37	
Registered electors		175,466		

== General elections 2013 ==
Provincial election 2013: PP-202 Multan-IX
Party	Candidate	Votes	%	±%
PML(N)	Rai Mansab Ali Khan	34,647	37.40	
PTI	Mamoona Hashmi	27,845	30.06	
PPP	Dr. Muhammad Akhtar Malik	24,520	26.47	
Pakistan Kissan Ittehad	Chaudary Khizer Hayat	2,627	2.84	
Independent	Rana Zulfiqar Ali	1,300	1.40	
Others	Others (nine candidates)	1,692	1.83	
Turnout		94,537	57.65	
Total valid votes		92,631	97.98	
Rejected ballots		1,906	2.02	
Majority		6,802	7.34	
Registered electors		163,983		

== See also ==
- PP-219 Multan-VII
- PP-221 Multan-IX
