= Kumhar Mandi =

Kumhar Mandi كُمہار منڈى
- Neighbourhood
- Location in Pakistan
- Coordinates: 30°11′52″N 71°28′11″E
- Country: Pakistan
- Region: Punjab
- District: Multan District
- Time zone: UTC+5 (PST)

Kumhar Mandi (Urdu: كُمہار منڈى), is a neighbourhood in Multan, Punjab, Pakistan. It is located at the start of Shujabad Road while turning towards Chowk Nagshah from Chowk Double Phatak. It is the main market for Muslim Colony residentials. Majority of people here speak Seraiki and Punjabi as native languages. Former prime minister Syed Yousaf Raza Gillani named flyover lands in this area on Shujabad road. Many residentials use this flyover for morning walk or exercise.
