= PP-222 Multan-X =

Constituency of the Punjabi Provincial Legislature, Pakistan

- Constituency for the Provincial Assembly of Punjab
- Region: Shujabad Tehsil (partly) including Shujabad city of Multan District

Current constituency
- Created from: PP-204 Multan-XI (2002-2018); PP-221 Multan-XI (2018-2023)

PP-222 Multan-X (پی پی-222، ملتان-10) is a Constituency of Provincial Assembly of Punjab.

== General elections 2024 ==
Provincial election 2024: PP-222 Multan-X
Party	Candidate	Votes	%	±%
Independent	Ayaz Ahmed (Note: Filed nomination papers as PTI candidate but ECP allowed him to run as an Independent)	30,523	23.92	
PPP	Rana Tahir Shabbir	28,616	22.43	
PML(N)	Rana Ejaz Ahmad Noon	26,965	21.13	
Independent	Syed Mujahid Ali Shah	23,212	18.19	
Independent	Malik Muhammad Hussain	5,604	4.39	
TLP	Muhammad Shameem Afzal Khan	5,427	4.25	
Others	Others (thirteen candidates)	7,242	5.69	
Turnout		131,926	50.30	
Total valid votes		127,589	96.71	
Rejected ballots		4,337	3.29	
Majority		1,907	1.49	
Registered electors		262,275		
hold				

== General elections 2018 ==
Provincial election 2018: PP-221 Multan-XI
Party	Candidate	Votes	%	±%
PML(N)	Rana Ejaz Anmad Noon	48,077	44.59	
PTI	Sohail Anmad Noon	32,609	30.25	
PPP	Khurram Farid Khan Khakwani	18,771	17.41	
TLP	Ashiq Ali	3,930	3.65	
Independent	Safder Mureed Abbas	2,100	1.95	
Independent	Rana Shoukat Hayat Noon	1,163	1.08	
Others	Others (three candidates)	1,163	1.09	
Turnout		111,039	55.79	
Total valid votes		107,813	97.10	
Rejected ballots		3,226	2.90	
Majority		15,468	14.34	
Registered electors		199,021		

== General elections 2013 ==
Provincial election 2013: PP-204 Multan-XI
Party	Candidate	Votes	%	±%
PML(N)	Rana Ijaz Ahmad Noon	26,930	30.16	
Independent	Syed Mujahid Ali Shah	23,537	26.36	
PPP	Rana Muhammad Sohail Ahmad Noon	19,729	22.09	
PTI	Raja Tariq Javed	9,072	10.16	
JI	Haji Muhammad Khalid Meo	7,410	8.30	
Others	Others (ten candidates	2,622	2.94	
Turnout		93,121	60.01	
Total valid votes		89,300	95.90	
Rejected ballots		3,821	4.10	
Majority		3,393	3.80	
Registered electors		155,176		

== General elections 2008 ==
Contesting candidates	Party affiliation	Votes polled

== See also ==
- PP-221 Multan-IX
- PP-223 Multan-XI
