= PP-219 Multan-VII =

Constituency of the Punjabi Provincial Legislature, Pakistan

- Constituency for the Provincial Assembly of Punjab
- Region: Multan Saddar Tehsil (partly) including Qadirpur Ran city of Multan District

Current constituency
- Created from: PP-201 Multan-VIII (2002-2018); PP-218 Multan-VIII (2018-2023)

PP-219 Multan-VII (پی پی-219، ملتان-7) is a Constituency of Provincial Assembly of Punjab.

== General elections 2024 ==
Provincial election 2024: PP-219 Multan-VII
Party	Candidate	Votes	%	±%
PPP	Malik Wasif Mazhar Raan	43,189	33.64	
PML(N)	Muhammad Akhtar	39,496	30.76	
Independent	Dalair Khan (Note: Filed nomination papers as PTI candidate but ECP allowed him to run as an Independent)	34,311	26.72	
TLP	Muhammad Salman Ellahi	5,466	4.26	
Others	Others (eleven candidates)	5,940	4.62	
Turnout		130,874	55.74	
Total valid votes		128,402	98.11	
Rejected ballots		2,472	1.89	
Majority		3,693	2.88	
Registered electors		234,774		
hold				

== General elections 2018 ==
Provincial election 2018: PP-218 Multan-VIII
Party	Candidate	Votes	%	±%
PTI	Mazhar Abbas Raan	45,872	39.70	
PPP	Malik Muhammad Abbas	37,530	32.48	
PML(N)	Zafar Ahmad	25,090	21.72	
TLP	Muhammad Akhtar	4,943	4.28	
Others	Others (five candidates)	2,110	1.83	
Turnout		117,830	59.11	
Total valid votes		115,545	98.06	
Rejected ballots		2,285	1.94	
Majority		8,342	7.22	
Registered electors		199,357		

== General elections 2013 ==
Provincial election 2013: PP-201 Multan-VIII
Party	Candidate	Votes	%	±%
PML(N)	Malik Mazhar Abbas Ran	35,233	38.76	
PPP	Makhdoom Mureed Hussain Qureshi	25,118	27.63	
PTI	Malik Muhammad Abbas Ran	24,367	26.81	
Independent	Malik Naseem Hussain Raan	4,342	4.78	
JI	Chaudary Abdul Rahim Gujar	1,034	1.14	
Others	Others (four candidates)	809	0.89	
Turnout		93,179	61.04	
Total valid votes		90,903	97.56	
Rejected ballots		2,276	2.44	
Majority		10,115	11.13	
Registered electors		152,649		

== General elections 2008 ==
Contesting candidates	Party affiliation	Votes polled

== See also ==
- PP-218 Multan-VI
- PP-220 Multan-VIII
