= Mian Muhammad Saqib Khurshid =

Pakistani politician

Member of the Provincial Assembly of the Punjab
- In office 15 August 2018 – 14 January 2023
- Constituency: PP-234 Vehari-VI
- In office 29 May 2013 – 31 May 2018

Personal details
- Born: 26 October 1962 (age 64) Vehari, Punjab, Pakistan
- Party: PMLN (1993-present)

Mian Muhammad Saqib Khurshid is a Pakistani politician who was a Member of the Provincial Assembly of the Punjab, from 1993 to 1999 and again from May 2013 to May 2018 and from August 2018 to January 2023.

== Early life and education ==
He was born on 26 October 1962.

He has the degree of Master of Arts in History and Pakistan Studies which he obtained in 1986 from the Islamia University. He received a Diploma in Islamic Studies from International Islamic University, Islamabad in 1987.

== Political career ==
He was elected to the Provincial Assembly of the Punjab as a candidate of Pakistan Muslim League (N) (PML-N) from Constituency PP-195 (Vehari-IV) in the 1993 Pakistani general election. He received 31,413 votes and defeated Nazar Muhammad Duggal, a candidate of Pakistan Islamic Front.

He was re-elected to the Provincial Assembly of the Punjab as a candidate of PML-N from Constituency PP-195 (Vehari-IV) in the 1997 Pakistani general election. received 27,958 votes and defeated Rana Tahir Mahmood, an independent candidate.

He was elected to the Provincial Assembly of the Punjab as a candidate of PML-N from Constituency PP-236 (Vehari-V) in the 2013 Pakistani general election. He received 44,694 votes and defeated an independent candidate, Rana Tahir Mahmood Khan.

He was re-elected to Provincial Assembly of the Punjab as a candidate of PML-N from Constituency PP-234 (Vehari-VI) in the 2018 Pakistani general election.
