= PP-233 Vehari-V =

Constituency of the Punjabi Provincial Legislature, Pakistan

- Constituency for the Provincial Assembly of Punjab
- Region: Vehari Tehsil (partly) including Vehari city of Vehari District

Current constituency
- Created from: PP-236 Vehari-V (2002-2018); PP-233 Vehari-V (2018-2023)

PP-233 Vehari-V (پی پی-233، وہاڑی-5) is a Constituency of Provincial Assembly of Punjab.

== General elections 2024 ==
Provincial election 2024: PP-233 Vehari-V
Party	Candidate	Votes	%	±%
PML(N)	Muhammad Saqib Khurshid	55,030	41.86	
Independent	Rai Zahoor Ahmad (Note: Filed nomination papers as PTI candidate but ECP allowed him to run as an Independent)	48,542	36.93	
TLP	Mehboob Ali	20,432	15.54	
PPP	Rabia Ijaz Hussain	2,461	1.87	
Others	Others (sixteen candidates)	4,984	3.80	
Turnout		134,269	54.38	
Total valid votes		131,449	97.90	
Rejected ballots		2,820	2.10	
Majority		6,488	4.93	
Registered electors		246,896		
hold				

== General elections 2018 ==
Provincial election 2018: PP-233 Vehari-V
Party	Candidate	Votes	%	±%
PTI	Rai Zahoor Ahmad	35,127	31.27	
Independent	Saeed Ahmad Khan Manais	24,977	22.24	
Independent	Nizam UI Din	18,573	16.54	
Independent	Muhammad Khurram Nazar Duggal	15,867	14.13	
TLP	Shafqat Ghaffar	6,517	5.80	
Independent	Muhammad Shabbir Rao Billu Khan	5,723	5.10	
PPP	Muhammad Saleem	2,062	1.84	
Independent	Muhammad Zakir	1,438	1.28	
Independent	Muhammad Irshad	1,202	1.07	
Others	Others (six candidates)	841	0.75	
Turnout		115,619	60.21	
Total valid votes		112,881	97.63	
Rejected ballots		2,738	2.37	
Majority		10,150	9.03	
Registered electors		192,018		

== General elections 2013 ==
Provincial election 2013: PP-236 Vehari-V
Party	Candidate	Votes	%	±%
PML(N)	Muhammad Saqib Khurshid	44,694	42.68	
Independent	Rana Tahir Mahmood Khan	37,783	36.08	
PTI	Tahir Anwar Wahala	19,481	18.60	
Others	Others (twenty three candidates)	2,772	2.65	
Turnout		107,314	63.33	
Total valid votes		104,730	97.59	
Rejected ballots		2,584	2.41	
Majority		6,911	6.60	
Registered electors		169,445		

== General elections 2008 ==
Contesting candidates	Party affiliation	Votes polled

== See also ==
- PP-232 Vehari-IV
- PP-234 Vehari-VI
