= Danewal =

Town in Punjab, Pakistan

Danewal (Urdu: دانيوال), is a town and union council in the suburb of Vehari city, in Vehari District of the Punjab province of Pakistan.
