= Syed Javed Ali Shah =

Pakistani politician

- سید جاوید علی شاہ

Minister for Water Resources
- In office 4 August 2017 – 31 May 2018
- President: Mamnoon Hussain
- Prime Minister: Shahid Khaqan Abbasi
- Preceded by: Khawaja Asif (as minister for Water and Power); Abid Sher Ali (as state minister for Water and Power)

Member of the National Assembly of Pakistan
- In office 1 June 2013 – 31 May 2018
- Constituency: NA-152 (Multan-V)

Personal details
- Born: 6 January 1955 (age 71) Multan, Punjab, Pakistan
- Party: PMLN

Syed Javed Ali Shah (Urdu: سید جاوید علی شاہ; born 6 January 1955) is a Pakistani politician who served as a Minister for Water Resources, in Abbasi cabinet from August 2017 to May 2018. He had been a member of the National Assembly of Pakistan, between 1990 and May 2018 and had been a member of the Provincial Assembly of the Punjab from 1988 to 1990.

He has the degree of Bachelor of Laws LL.B.

== Political career ==
Shah was elected to the Provincial Assembly of Punjab from Constituency PP-168 (Multan) as a Pakistan Peoples Party (PPP) candidate in the 1988 Pakistani general election.

He was elected to the National Assembly of Pakistan as a Islami Jamhoori Ittehad (IJI) candidate from Constituency NA-119 (Multan-VI) in the 1990 Pakistani general election. He received 66,900 votes and defeated Rana Shaukat Hayat, a candidate of Pakistan Democratic Alliance (PDA).

He was re-elected to the National Assembly as a candidate of Pakistan Muslim League (N) (PML-N) from Constituency NA-119 (Multan-VI) in the 1993 Pakistani general election. He received 63,091 votes and defeated Rana Shaukat Hayat, a candidate of PPP.

He was re-elected to the National Assembly as a candidate of PML-N from Constituency NA-119 (Multan-VI) in the 1997 Pakistani general election. He received 71,953 votes and defeated Malik Ghulam Abbas Khakhi, a candidate of PPP.

He ran for the seat of the National Assembly as a candidate of PML-N from Constituency NA-152 (Multan-V) in the 2002 Pakistani general election but was unsuccessful. He received 36,870 votes and lost the seat to Assad Murtaza Gilani.

He remained a member of the Senate of Pakistan from 2006 to 2012.

He was re-elected to the National Assembly as a candidate of PML-N from Constituency NA-152 (Multan-V) in the 2013 Pakistani general election. He received 81,015 votes and defeated Muhammad Ibraheem Khan, a candidate of Pakistan Tehreek-e-Insaf.

Following the election of Shahid Khaqan Abbasi as Prime Minister of Pakistan in August 2017, he was inducted into the federal cabinet of Abbasi. Qureshi assumed the role of Federal Minister for Water Resources in the cabinet. However, his tenure in this position ended when the National Assembly's term expired, and it was dissolved on 31 May 2018.
