= PP-217 Multan-V =

- Constituency for the Provincial Assembly of Punjab
- Region: Multan city area (South) and old city in Multan District

Current constituency
- Created from: PP-196 Multan-III (2002-2018); PP-216 Multan-VI and PP-217 Multan-VII (2018-2023)

PP-217 Multan-V (پی پی-217، ملتان-5) is a Constituency of Provincial Assembly of Punjab.

== General elections 2024 ==
Provincial election 2024: PP-217 Multan-V
Party	Candidate	Votes	%	±%
Independent	Muhammad Nadeem Qureshi (Note: Filed nomination papers as PTI candidate but ECP allowed him to run as an Independent)	62,213	48.41	
PML(N)	Sheikh Muhammad Tariq Rashid	32,091	24.97	
PPP	Malik Rizwan Abid Thaheem	11,343	8.83	
Independent	Muhamamd Tahir Dogar	10,512	8.18	
TLP	Akhtar Raza Qureshi	6,128	4.77	
Others	Others (twenty two candidates)	6,214	4.84	
Turnout		130,499	41.56	
Total valid votes		128,501	98.47	
Rejected ballots		1,998	1.53	
Majority		30,122	23.44	
Registered electors		313,999		
hold				

== General elections 2018 ==
Provincial election 2018: PP-217 Multan-VII
Party	Candidate	Votes	%	±%
Independent	Muhammad Salman	35,300	37.78	
PTI	Makhdoom Shah Mahmood Qureshi	31,734	33.96	
PML(N)	Tasneem Kausar	21,625	23.15	
PPP	Kalsoom Naz	3,964	4.24	
Others	Others (five candidates)	810	0.86	
Turnout		95,916	51.37	
Total valid votes		93,433	97.41	
Rejected ballots		2,483	2.59	
Majority		3,566	3.82	
Registered electors		186,732		

== General elections 2013 ==
Provincial election 2013: PP-196 Multan-III
Party	Candidate	Votes	%	±%
PML(N)	Abdul Waheed Chouhdry	33,030	38.68	
PTI	Rana Abdul Jabbar	28,826	33.76	
PPP	Akhtar Hussain Qamar	10,000	11.71	
Independent	Muhammad Altaf Khan	8,895	10.42	
Independent	Muhammad Shafiq	1,222	1.43	
Others	Others (twenty nine candidates)	3,409	3.99	
Turnout		86,704	49.33	
Total valid votes		85,382	98.48	
Rejected ballots		1,322	1.52	
Majority		4,204	4.92	
Registered electors		175,778		

== General elections 2008 ==
Contesting candidates	Party affiliation	Votes polled

== See also ==
- PP-216 Multan-IV
- PP-218 Multan-VI
