= Gulzarpur =

Gulzarpur گُلزار پُور ਗੁਲਜ਼ਾਰਪੁਰ
- Location within Pakistan
- Coordinates: 30.6°N 71.34°E
- Country: Pakistan
- Province: Punjab
- Elevation: 114 m (374 ft)
- Time zone: UTC+5 (PST)

Gulzarpur (Urdu: گُلزار پُور), (Gurmukhi: ਗੁਲਜ਼ਾਰਪੁਰ), is a village in Multan District in West Punjab, Pakistan. It is located at 30°6'0N 71°34'0E lying to the south-east of the district capital Multan - with an altitude of 114 metres (377 feet).
