= Nawabzada Waseem Khan Badozai =

Pakistani politician

Barrister Nawabzada Waseem Khan Badozai

Member of the Provincial Assembly of the Punjab
- In office 15 August 2018 – 14 January 2023
- Constituency: PP-213 Multan-III

Personal details
- Party: PTI (2018-present)

Barrister Nawabzada Waseem Khan Badozai is a Pakistani politician who had been a member of the Provincial Assembly of the Punjab from August 2018 till January 2023. He was also a member of the Standing committee on Home Affairs.

== Early life and education ==
Born on 1 January 1976 in Multan, Punjab, he obtained the degree of LL.B. (Hons.) in 1999 and completed Diploma in Associate Programme of European Union Law in 2000 from the University of East London (UEL), UK. Later, he completed the BVC-Barrister at Law in 2002 from the Honorable Society of Lincoln's Inn, England, UK.

== Academic career ==
He served as an Honorary Lecturer from 2004 to 2006 at the Bahauddin Zakariya University, Multan.

== Political career ==
He remained Nazim Union Council, District Council Multan from 2005 to 2008.

He was elected to the Provincial Assembly of the Punjab as a candidate of the Pakistan Tehreek-e-Insaf (PTI) from PP-213 (Multan-III) in the 2018 Punjab provincial election. Advisor to Chief Minister, Member: Special Committee No. 5, Home, Special Committee No. 8, Special Committee No. 9 (chairperson), Special Committee No. 10, Special Committee No.13, Special Committee No.12, Public Accounts Committee-II.

He ran for a seat in the Provincial Assembly from PP-213 Multan-III as a candidate of the PTI in the 2024 Punjab provincial election.
