= Rai Zahoor Ahmad =

Pakistani politician

Member of the Provincial Assembly of the Punjab
- In office 15 August 2018 – 14 January 2023
- Constituency: PP-233 Vehari-V

Personal details
- Party: PTI (2018-present)

Rai Zahoor Ahmad is a Pakistani politician who had been a member of the Provincial Assembly of the Punjab from August 2018 till January 2023.

== Political career ==
He was elected to the Provincial Assembly of the Punjab as a candidate of the Pakistan Tehreek-e-Insaf (PTI) from PP-233 (Vehari-V) in the 2018 Punjab provincial election.

He ran for a seat in the Provincial Assembly from PP-233 Vehari-V as a candidate of the PTI in the 2024 Punjab provincial election.
