= Contempt of Parliament (Pakistan) =

Law in Pakistan

- Long title: A bill to provide for the punishment of contempt of Parliament
- Passed: 16 May 2023
- Introduced by: Rana Muhammad Qasim Noon

Contempt of Parliament is a law that passed on 16 May 2023, the National Assembly of Pakistan approved via the Contempt of Parliament Bill 2023. This legislation was put forth by Rana Muhammad Qasim Noon, a Member of the National Assembly (MNA). The bill outlines penalties for individuals convicted of contempt, including imprisonment lasting from 2 to 6 years and a monetary fine of one million rupees. It's worth noting that this law is applicable to both government and state institution officials, as well as the general public.

== History ==
On 24 May 2023, the Senate approved the bill, following its prior passage by the National Assembly. The bill's stipulations do empower a bicameral Contempt Committee to potentially impose a prison sentence of one year and levy a fine of Rs. one million on those found in contempt.

== See also ==
- Contempt of Court (Pakistan)
