= Mehdi Abbas Khan =

Pakistani politician

Member of the Provincial Assembly of the Punjab
- In office 2008 – 31 May 2018

Personal details
- Born: 15 August 1958 (age 68) Multan, Pakistan
- Party: Pakistan Muslim League (N)

Punjab Assembly Lahore

Mehdi Abbas Khan is a Pakistani politician who was a Member of the Provincial Assembly of the Punjab, from 2008 to May 2018.

== Early life and education ==
He was born on 15 August 1958 in Multan.

He has the degree of Master of Arts which he obtained in 1983 from Bahauddin Zakariya University.

== Political career ==
He ran for the seat of the Provincial Assembly of the Punjab as a candidate of Pakistan Muslim League (N) (PML-N) from Constituency PP-205 (Multan-XII) in the 2002 Pakistani general election but was unsuccessful. He received 25,293 votes and defeated Rana Muhammad Qasim Noon.

He was elected to the Provincial Assembly of the Punjab as a candidate of Pakistan Muslim League (Q) (PML-Q) from Constituency PP-205 (Multan-XII) in the 2008 Pakistani general election. He received 35,739 votes and defeated Malik Ghulam Abbas, an independent candidate.

He was re-elected to the Provincial Assembly of the Punjab as a candidate of PML-N from Constituency PP-205 (Multan-XII) in the 2013 Pakistani general election. He received 39,760 votes and defeated Malik Ghulam Abbas, a candidate of Pakistan Peoples Party (PPP).
