= PP-223 Multan-XI =

Constituency of the Punjabi Provincial Legislature, Pakistan

- Constituency for the Provincial Assembly of Punjab
- Region: Shujabad Tehsil (partly) and Jalalpur Pirwala Tehsil (partly) of Multan District

Current constituency
- Created from: PP-205 Multan-XII (2002-2018); PP-222 Multan-XII (2018-2023)

PP-223 Multan-XI (پی پی-223، ملتان-11) is a Constituency of Provincial Assembly of Punjab.

== General elections 2024 ==
Provincial election 2024: PP-223 Multan-XI
| Party | Candidate | Votes | % | ±% |
|---|---|---|---|---|
| PML(N) | Muhammad Nazik Kareem | 36,505 | 25.37 | |
| Independent | Shazia Nargis | 28,900 | 20.08 | |
| Independent | Rana Tufail Ahmad Noon (Note: Filed nomination papers as PTI candidate but ECP allowed him to run as an Independent) | 16,500 | 11.47 | |
| Independent | Rana Talal Ahmed Noon | 13,278 | 9.23 | |
| PPP | Chaudhry Asif Ali | 10,924 | 7.59 | |
| Independent | Mehdi Abbas Khan | 10,154 | 7.06 | |
| Independent | Ahmad Khan Alias Ahmad Bakhsh | 8,695 | 6.04 | |
| Independent | Jam Altaf Ahmad | 7,017 | 4.88 | |
| TLP | Sabir Hussain Shah | 5,566 | 3.87 | |
| Others | Others (seventeen candidates) | 6,377 | 4.41 | |
| Turnout | | 149,074 | 53.34 | |
| Total valid votes | | 143,916 | 96.54 | |
| Rejected ballots | | 5,158 | 3.46 | |
| Majority | | 7,605 | 5.29 | |
| Registered electors | | 279,465 | | |
| hold | | | | |

== General elections 2018 ==
Provincial election 2018: PP-222 Multan-XII
| Party | Candidate | Votes | % | ±% |
|---|---|---|---|---|
| PTI | Malik Ghulam Abbas | 47,521 | 42.77 | |
| PML(N) | Mehdi Abbas Khan | 36,017 | 32.41 | |
| Independent | Muhammad Akram | 17,992 | 16.19 | |
| PPP | Faheem Raza | 5,368 | 4.83 | |
| TLP | Qari Muhammad Qasim | 2,749 | 2.47 | |
| Others | Others (seven candidates) | 1,469 | 1.33 | |
| Turnout | | 114,392 | 58.64 | |
| Total valid votes | | 111,116 | 97.14 | |
| Rejected ballots | | 3,276 | 2.86 | |
| Majority | | 11,504 | 10.36 | |
| Registered electors | | 195,067 | | |

== General elections 2008 ==
Provincial election 2013: PP-205 Multan-XII
| Party | Candidate | Votes | % | ±% |
|---|---|---|---|---|
| PML(N) | Mehdi Abbas Khan | 39,760 | 41.35 | |
| PPP | Malik Ghulam Abbas | 33,127 | 34.45 | |
| PTI | Haji Muhammad Bukhsh | 9,592 | 9.97 | |
| Independent | Rana Shahzad Ahmad Noon | 5,157 | 5.36 | |
| Independent | Ghazanfar Ali Khan | 3,649 | 3.79 | |
| JUI (F) | Muhammad Saleem | 2,168 | 2.25 | |
| Others | Others (seven candidates) | 2,710 | 2.82 | |
| Turnout | | 99,714 | 63.30 | |
| Total valid votes | | 96,163 | 96.44 | |
| Rejected ballots | | 3,551 | 3.56 | |
| Majority | | 6,633 | 6.90 | |
| Registered electors | | 157,535 | | |

== See also ==
- PP-222 Multan-X
- PP-224 Multan-XII
