= Ibrahim Khan (politician) =

Pakistani politician

Member of the National Assembly of Pakistan
- In office 13 August 2018 – 20 January 2023
- Constituency: NA-158 (Multan-V)

Personal details
- Born: Multan, Punjab, Pakistan
- Party: PTI (2018-2023)

Ibrahim Khan is a Pakistani politician who was a member of the National Assembly of Pakistan from August 2018 to January 2023.

== Political career ==
Khan was elected to the National Assembly of Pakistan from Constituency NA-158 (Multan-V) as a candidate of Pakistan Tehreek-e-Insaf in the 2018 Pakistani general election. Previously he was a member of Punjab provincial assembly from 2002 to 2008. He won as an independent candidate and later joined PML Q.

He contested elections in 2008 and 2013 and each time was defeated due to different reasons. In the 2018 elections, he defeated two heavyweights: former PM Yousuf Raza and former federal Minister Javed Ali Shah.
