= Contempt of Court (Pakistan) =

Contempt of court in Pakistan

Parliament of Pakistan
- Long title: An Act to regulate the exercise of the powers of courts to punish contempt of court
- Citation: Act No. VI of 2012
- Enacted by: Parliament of Pakistan
- Enacted: 12 July 2012
- Assented to: 12 July 2012
- Commenced: 12 July 2012
- Status: Unknown

The Contempt of Court in Pakistan refers to actions involving defiance or lack of respect towards a court of law and its officials, demonstrated through behaviors that challenge or undermine the court's authority, fairness, and decorum. The Contempt of Court Act of 2012 is the legislation that governs how courts in Pakistan can utilize their authority to address instances of contempt of court.

== Notable Contempt of Court cases ==
- Yusuf Raza Gilani: In 2012, the Supreme Court of Pakistan found former Prime Minister Yusuf Raza Gilani in contempt of court due to his refusal to reopen corruption cases against the president. As a symbolic punishment, he was subjected to a brief detention within the courtroom.
- Talal Chaudhry: In 2018, Talal Chaudhry, a leader of Pakistan Muslim League (N), was convicted of contempt of court by the Supreme Court. His conviction resulted in a prison sentence until the court's adjournment and a monetary fine under Article 204. Following his conviction, Chaudhry became ineligible to participate in elections for the subsequent five years and hold any public office.
- Imran Khan: In 2022, a court acknowledged an apology offered by the former Prime Minister, Imran Khan, leading to the dismissal of a contempt of court lawsuit against him. The allegations directed at Khan stemmed from a speech in which he was accused of making threats toward police and judicial officials.
- Sardar Tanveer Ilyas: In 2023, the High Court of Pakistan in Azad Kashmir disqualified former Prime Minister Sardar Tanveer Ilyas from the legislative assembly membership on the grounds of contempt of court. This decision was reached by a full bench of the region's High Court.

== Punishment ==
The consequences for contempt of court in Pakistan encompass various penalties, such as incarceration, monetary fines, ineligibility for public office or electoral participation, and dismissal from other positions. As outlined in the Contempt of Court Act of 2012, individuals found guilty of contempt of court can face a sentence of up to six months of simple imprisonment, a fine not exceeding one hundred thousand rupees or both. In cases where an appeal for clemency is declined, these sanctions may be enforced.

== See also ==
- Contempt of Parliament (Pakistan)
