= PP-232 Vehari-IV =

Constituency of the Punjabi Provincial Legislature, Pakistan

- Constituency for the Provincial Assembly of Punjab
- Region: Burewala Tehsil (partly) and Vehari Tehsil (partly) of Vehari District

Current constituency
- Created from: PP-235 Vehari-IV (2002-2018); PP-232 Vehari-IV (2018-2023)

PP-232 Vehari-IV (پی پی-232، وہاڑی-4) is a Constituency of Provincial Assembly of Punjab, in Pakistan.

== General elections 2024 ==
Provincial election 2024: PP-232 Vehari-IV
Party	Candidate	Votes	%	±%
PML(N)	Malik Nosher Khan Ajum Laghrial	33,320	26.65	
JI	Ali Waqas	26,962	21.57	
Independent	Abdul Waheed Grewal (Note: Filed nomination papers as PTI candidate but ECP allowed him to run as an Independent)	23,841	19.07	
PPP	Shaharyar Ali Khan	23,130	18.50	
TLP	Muhammad Haider Abbas	6,753	5.40	
Independent	Amjad Hameed Chohan	3,857	3.09	
Independent	Malik Taimur Khalid	3,661	2.93	
Others	Others (eleven candidates)	3,485	2.79	
Turnout		129,416	56.94	
Total valid votes		125,009	96.59	
Rejected ballots		4,407	3.41	
Majority		6,358	5.08	
Registered electors		227,280		
hold				

== General elections 2018 ==
Provincial election 2018: PP-232 Vehari-IV
Party	Candidate	Votes	%	±%
PTI	Muhammad Ejaz Hussain	27,346	25.90	
PML(N)	Bilal Akbar Bhatti	25,515	24.17	
Independent	Malik Nosher Khan Anjum Langrial	18,754	17.76	
Independent	Ali Waqas	16,473	15.60	
TLP	Syed Fazal Rasool Shah	6,637	6.29	
Independent	Muhammad Shabbir Alam	4,827	4.57	
PHP	Ayaz Hussain	2,377	2.25	
Independent	Mumtaz Masood Chaudhary	1,179	1.12	
Others	Others (five candidates)	2,469	2.34	
Turnout		108,894	59.14	
Total valid votes		105,577	96.95	
Rejected ballots		3,317	3.05	
Majority		1,831	1.73	
Registered electors		184,140		

== General elections 2013 ==
Provincial election 2013: PP-235 Vehari-IV
Party	Candidate	Votes	%	±%
PML(N)	Bilal Akbar Bhatti	26,348	26.13	
Independent	Muhammad Ijaz Hussain	24,549	24.35	
PTI	Khalid Mehmood Chohan	20,709	20.54	
PPP	Malik Noshare Khan Anjam	15,859	15.73	
JI	Ali Waqas	9,138	9.06	
Independent	Abdul Shakoor	1,822	1.81	
Others	Others (ten candidates)	2,390	2.37	
Turnout		104,250	63.04	
Total valid votes		100,815	96.71	
Rejected ballots		3,435	3.29	
Majority		1,799	1.78	
Registered electors		165,365		

== General elections 2008 ==
Contesting candidates	Party affiliation	Votes polled

== See also ==
- PP-231 Vehari-III
- PP-233 Vehari-V
