= Rana Muhammad Qasim Noon =

Pakistani politician

- رانا محمد قاسم نون

Member of the National Assembly of Pakistan
- Incumbent
- Assumed office 29 February 2024
- Constituency: NA-153 Multan-VI
- In office 13 August 2018 – 10 August 2023
- Constituency: NA-159 (Multan-VI)
- In office 25 March 2016 – April 2018
- Constituency: NA-153 (Multan-VI)

Member of the Provincial Assembly of the Punjab
- In office 2002–2007
- Constituency: PP-205 (Multan-XII)

Personal details
- Born: 10 November 1962 (age 64) Multan, Punjab, Pakistan
- Party: IPP (2026-present)
- Other political affiliations: PMLN (2023-2026); PTI (2018-2022); PMLN (2016-2018); PPP (2013-2016); IND (2008-2013); PML(Q) (2002-2008)

Rana Muhammad Qasim Noon (Urdu: رانا محمد قاسم نون; born 10 November 1962) is a Pakistani politician who has been a member of the National Assembly of Pakistan since February 2024 and previously served in this position from August 2018 till August 2023 and from March 2016 to April 2018. He was a member of the Provincial Assembly of the Punjab as well as Provincial Minister Punjab from 2002 to 2007.

Rana Muhammad Qasim has been appointed as Chairman Kashmir Committee and he took over the charge as on February 20, 2024.

== Early life and education ==
Noon was born on 10 November 1962.

He received MA degree in Political Science from Bahauddin Zakariya University in 1983. He received his L.L.B. degree in 1988 and MA degree in 1989, both from Bahauddin Zakariya University.

== Political career ==
Prior to entering politics, Noon served as Chief Protocol Officer in Pakistan International Airlines from 1985 to 1990.

He ran for the seat of the National Assembly of Pakistan as a candidate of Pakistan Muslim League (Q) (PML-Q) from Constituency NA-153 (Multan-VI) in the 2002 Pakistani general election but was unsuccessful. He received 55,395 votes and lost the seat to Dewan Syed Jaffar Hussain Bukhari, a candidate of Pakistan Muslim League (N) (PML-N). In the same election, he was elected to the Provincial Assembly of the Punjab as a candidate of PML-Q from Constituency PP-205 (Multan-XII). He received 25,902 votes and defeated Mehdi Abbas Khan.

In November 2003, he was inducted into the Punjab provincial cabinet of Chief Minister Chaudhry Pervaiz Elahi and was appointed Provincial Minister of Punjab for Agriculture Marketing where he served until November 2006. During his tenure as Member of the Punjab Assembly, he also served as Provincial Minister of Punjab for Labour and Human Resource.

He ran for the seat of the National Assembly as an independent candidate from Constituency NA-153 (Multan-VI) in the 2008 Pakistani general election but was unsuccessful. He received 68,762 votes and lost the seat to Syed Ashiq Hussain Bukhari, a candidate of PML-Q.

He ran for the seat of the National Assembly as a candidate of Pakistan Peoples Party (PPP) from Constituency NA-153 (Multan-VI) in the 2013 Pakistani general election but was unsuccessful. He received 90,179 votes and lost the seat to Syed Ashiq Hussain Bukhari. Following the defeat in the elections, he quit PPP and joined Pakistan Tehreek-e-Insaf (PTI). He quit PTI and joined Pakistan Muslim League (N) (PML-N) in 2016.

He was elected to the National Assembly as a candidate of PML-N from Constituency NA-153 (Multan-VI) in by-elections held in March 2016. He received 107,737 votes and defeated Malik Ghulam Abbas, a candidate of Pakistan Tehreek-e-Insaf (PTI).

In April 2018, he quit PML-N and resigned from the National Assembly. In May 2018, he announced to join PTI.

He was re-elected to the National Assembly as a candidate of PTI from Constituency NA-159 (Multan-VI) in the 2018 Pakistani general election. During No Confidence motion against prime minister Imran Khan he joined hands with opposition.

In 2023, Noon introduced the Contempt of Parliament Bill, which was passed by the National Assembly of Pakistan on 16 May 2023.

He was re-elected to the National Assembly as a candidate of PML-N from NA-153 Multan-VI in the 2024 Pakistani general election. He received 95,202 votes and defeated Dewan Ashiq Hussain Bukhari, an independent candidate.
