= Malik Ghulam Abbas =

Pakistani politician (died 2018)

Member of the Provincial Assembly of the Punjab
- In office July 2018 – January 2023

Personal details
- Party: Pakistan Tehreek-e-Insaf (2013-2023)
- Other political affiliations: Pakistan Peoples Party (1988-2013)

Malik Ghulam Abbas (Urdu: ملک غلام عباس) was a Pakistani politician who was elected to the Provincial Assembly of the Punjab in 2018 general election but died before assuming office.

== Political career ==
He ran for the seat of the Provincial Assembly of the Punjab as a candidate of Pakistan Peoples Party (PPP) from Constituency PP-205 (Multan-XII) in the 2002 Pakistani general election. He received 13,302 votes and lost the seat to Rana Muhammad Qasim Noon.

He ran for the seat of the Provincial Assembly of the Punjab as an independent candidate from Constituency PP-205 (Multan-XII) in the 2008 Pakistani general election. He received 29,523 votes and lost the seat to Mehdi Abbas Khan.

He ran for the seat of the Provincial Assembly of the Punjab as a candidate of PPP from Constituency PP-205 (Multan-XII) in the 2013 Pakistani general election. He received 33,127 votes and lost the seat to Mehdi Abbas Khan.

He joined Pakistan Tehreek-e-Insaf (PTI) following the 2013 general elections.

He ran for the seat of the National Assembly of Pakistan as a candidate of PTI from Constituency NA-153 (Multan-VI) in by-elections held in March 2016, but was unsuccessful. He received 37,212 votes and lost the seat to Rana Muhammad Qasim Noon.

He was elected to the Provincial Assembly of Punjab as a candidate of PTI from Constituency PP-222 (Multan-XII) in the 2018 Pakistani general election. He received 47,429 votes and defeated Mehdi Abbas Khan.

== Death ==
On 15 August 2018, he died in Islamabad before swearing in as member of the Punjab Assembly. He suffered a heart attack four days before his death after which he was hospitalized in Islamabad.
