= Mian Tariq Abdullah =

Pakistani politician

Member of the Provincial Assembly of the Punjab
- In office 15 August 2018 – 14 January 2023
- Constituency: PP-220 Multan-X

Personal details
- Born: March 15, 1957 (age 69) Multan, Punjab, Pakistan
- Party: TLP (2025–present)
- Other political affiliations: IPP (2023–2025); PTI (2018–2023)

Mian Tariq Abdullah is a Pakistani politician who had been a member of the Provincial Assembly of the Punjab from August 2018 till January 2023.

== Early life and education ==
He was born on 15 March 1957 in Multan, Pakistan.

He has a degree of Bachelor of Arts.

== Political career ==
He was elected to the Provincial Assembly of the Punjab as a candidate of the Pakistan Tehreek-e-Insaf (PTI) from PP-220 (Multan-X) in the 2018 Punjab provincial election.

He ran for a seat in the Provincial Assembly from PP-220 Multan-X as a candidate of the IPP in the 2024 Punjab provincial election.
