= Muhammad Nadeem Qureshi =

Pakistani politician

Provincial Parliamentary Secretary for Information and Culture
- In office 29 January 2019 – 14 January 2023

Member of the Provincial Assembly of the Punjab
- In office 15 August 2018 – 14 January 2023
- Constituency: PP-216 Multan-VI

Personal details
- Party: PTI (2018-present)

Muhammad Nadeem Qureshi is a Pakistani politician who had been a member of the Provincial Assembly of the Punjab from August 2018 till January 2023.

== Political career ==
He was elected to the Provincial Assembly of the Punjab as a candidate of the Pakistan Tehreek-e-Insaf (PTI) from PP-216 (Multan-VI) in the 2018 Punjab provincial election. He was the Parliamentary Secretary Punjab and Member Kashmir Committee.

He ran for a seat in the Provincial Assembly from PP-216 Multan-VI as a candidate of the PTI in the 2024 Punjab provincial election.
