= Malik Wasif Mazhar Raan =

Pakistani politician

Member of the Provincial Assembly of Punjab
- In office 11 April 2019 – 14 January 2023
- Constituency: PP-218 Multan-VIII

Personal details
- Party: IPP (2023-present)
- Other political affiliations: PTI (2018-2023)

Malik Wasif Mazhar Raan is a Pakistani politician who had been a member of the Provincial Assembly of Punjab from April 2019 till January 2023.

== Political career ==
He was elected to the Provincial Assembly of the Punjab from PP-218 (Multan-VIII) as a candidate of the Pakistan Tehreek-e-Insaf (PTI). He won the election with a majority of 7,502 votes over the runner up Malik Muhammad Arshad Raan of the Pakistan People's Party (PPP). He garnered 46,988 votes while Arshad Raan received 39,486 votes.

He ran for a seat in the Provincial Assembly from PP-218 Multan-VIII as a candidate of the IPP in the 2024 Punjab provincial election.
