= Mian Khurshid Anwar =

Mian Khurshid Anwar, Founder of District Vehari

Mian Khurshid Anwar میاں خورشید انور
- Born: Kapoor Thalla, Jalandhar district, India
- Died: Vehari
- Burial: Vehari
- Religion: Islam

Mian Khurshid Anwar (Urdu: میاں خورشید انور) was a Punjabi politician, journalist and former deputy opposition leader of Punjab Assembly.

== Life and career ==
He was a member of the Provincial Assembly of the Punjab (MPA), representing Vehari in 1972 and in 1977.
