= PP-215 Multan-III =

Constituency of the Provincial Assembly of Punjab, Pakistan

- Constituency for the Provincial Assembly of Punjab
- Region: Multan city area (North) of Multan District

Current constituency
- Created from: PP-198 Multan-V (2002-2018); PP-214 Multan-IV (2018-2023)

PP-215 Multan-III (پی پی-215، ملتان-3) is a Constituency of Provincial Assembly of Punjab.

== General elections 2024 ==
Provincial election 2024: PP-215 Multan-III
Party	Candidate	Votes	%	±%
Independent	Muhammad Moeen Ud Din Riaz (Note: Filed nomination papers as PTI candidate but ECP allowed him to run as an Independent)	67,064	56.09	
PML(N)	Shahid Mahmood Khan	29,177	24.40	
PPP	Shakeel Hussain	8,012	6.70	
TLP	Abrar Ul Haq Khan	3,685	3.08	
Independent	Muhammad Sharif	3,604	3.01	
JI	Mian Asif Mehmood	2,934	2.45	
Others	Others (twenty five candidates)	5,100	4.27	
Turnout		121,473	44.41	
Total valid votes		119,576	98.44	
Rejected ballots		1,897	1.56	
Majority		37,887	31.69	
Registered electors		273,503		
hold				

== General elections 2018 ==
Provincial election 2018: PP-214 Multan-IV
Party	Candidate	Votes	%	±%
PTI	Muhammad Zaheer Ud Din Khan Alizai	47,258	49.33	
PML(N)	Malik Asif Rafique Rajwana	25,218	26.32	
PPP	Muhammad Usman	13,585	14.18	
Independent	Rao Mazhar UI Islam	3,801	3.97	
MMA	Sheikh Jamshed Hayat	3,166	3.31	
TLP	Zafar Iqbal	1,507	1.57	
Others	Others (seven candidates)	1,264	1.32	
Turnout		97,329	48.35	
Total valid votes		95,799	98.43	
Rejected ballots		1,530	1.57	
Majority		22,040	23.01	
Registered electors		201,316		

== General elections 2013 ==
Provincial election 2013: PP-198 Multan-V
Party	Candidate	Votes	%	±%
PML(N)	Peer Zada Mian Shazad Maqbool Bhutta	32,112	39.79	
PTI	Nawab Zada Waseem Khan Bado Zai	29,728	36.84	
PPP	Muhammad Adnan Dogar	12,204	15.12	
Independent	Shakeel Hussain Labar	2,224	2.76	
JI	Iftar Ali Iftikhar	1,131	1.40	
Others	Others (twenty one candidates)	3,295	4.08	
Turnout		82,110	56.01	
Total valid votes		80,694	98.28	
Rejected ballots		1,416	1.72	
Majority		2,384	2.95	
Registered electors		146,597		

== General elections 2008 ==
Contesting candidates	Party affiliation	Votes polled

== See also ==
- PP-214 Multan-II
- PP-216 Multan-IV
