= PP-230 Vehari-II =

Constituency of the Punjabi Provincial Legislature, Pakistan

- Constituency for the Provincial Assembly of Punjab
- Region: Burewala Tehsil (partly) of Vehari District

Current constituency
- Created from: PP-234 Vehari-III (2002-2018); PP-231 Vehari-III (2018-2023)

PP-230 Vehari-II (پی پی-230، وہاڑی-2) is a Constituency of Provincial Assembly of Punjab.

== General elections 2024 ==
Provincial election 2024: PP-230 Vehari-II
Party	Candidate	Votes	%	±%
Independent	Salman Shahid (Note: Filed nomination papers as PTI candidate but ECP allowed him to run as an Independent)	44,954	36.86	
PML(N)	Mian Irfan Aqueel Daultana	30,770	25.23	
TLP	Syed Saleem Hussain Shah	20,065	16.45	
PPP	Imran Khan Saldera	14,317	11.74	
PMML	Qaiser Manzoor	2,984	2.45	
PKI-Ch.Anwar	Zulfiqar Hussain Awan	2,901	2.38	
Kissan Ittehad	Muhammad Ranjha	2,386	1.96	
Others	Others (ten candidates)	3,567	2.93	
Turnout		125,799	53.48	
Total valid votes		121,944	96.94	
Rejected ballots		3,855	3.06	
Majority		14,184	11.63	
Registered electors		235,234		
hold				

== General elections 2018 ==
Provincial election 2018: PP-231 Vehari-III
Party	Candidate	Votes	%	±%
PML(N)	Mian Irfan Aqeel Daultana	17,125	16.15	
PTI	Ishaq Khan Khakwani	16,229	15.31	
Independent	Salman Shahid	14,964	14.11	
Independent	Imran Khan Saldera	10,883	10.27	
PKI-Ch.Anwar	Malik Zulfiqar Hussain	9,649	9.10	
Independent	Shahzad Farid Ud Din	9,036	8.52	
TLP	Mohsin Fareed Chishti	8,224	7.76	
PHP	Hafiz Shehryar	7,707	7.27	
Independent	Muhammad Ranjha	7,081	6.68	
AAT	Muhammad Abdullah	3,061	2.89	
Independent	Muhammad Anwar	1,559	1.47	
Others	Others (three candidates)	506	0.47	
Turnout		109,753	56.76	
Total valid votes		106,024	96.60	
Rejected ballots		3,729	3.40	
Majority		896	0.84	
Registered electors		193,362		

== General elections 2013 ==
Provincial election 2013: PP-234 Vehari-III
Party	Candidate	Votes	%	±%
PML(N)	Mian Irfan Aqeel Daultana	23,937	28.06	
Independent	Muhammad Afzal Karim	16,788	19.68	
PPP	Shehzad Ali Khan	15,701	18.41	
PTI	Muhammad Ayub Khan	13,956	16.36	
Independent	Shehzad Farid Ud Din	7,726	9.06	
Independent	Shahid Parvaiz Alia Shah Ali	2,652	3.11	
Independent	Asad Ali	1,454	1.70	
Independent	Syed Faiz Ali Shah	1,235	1.45	
Others	Others (eight candidates)	1,856	2.18	
Turnout		89,455	60.66	
Total valid votes		85,305	95.36	
Rejected ballots		4,150	4.64	
Majority		7,149	8.38	
Registered electors		147,480		

== General elections 2008 ==
Contesting candidates	Party affiliation	Votes polled

== See also ==
- PP-229 Vehari-I
- PP-231 Vehari-III
