= PP-229 Vehari-I =

Constituency of the Punjabi Provincial Legislature, Pakistan

- Constituency for the Provincial Assembly of Punjab
- Region: Burewala Tehsil (partly) of Vehari District

Current constituency
- Created from: PP-232 Vehari-I (2002-2018); PP-229 Vehari-I (2018-)

PP-229 Vehari-I (پی پی-229، وہاڑی-1) is a Constituency of Provincial Assembly of Punjab.

== General elections 2024 ==
Provincial election 2024: PP-229 Vehari-I
Party	Candidate	Votes	%	±%
PML(N)	Mohammad Yousaf	49,883	36.35	
Independent	Arifa Nazir (Note: Filed nomination papers as PTI candidate but ECP allowed him to run as an Independent)	40,884	29.79	
Independent	Khalid Mahmood Chohan	10,555	7.69	
TLP	Samiullah	10,289	7.50	
Independent	Peer Ghulam Mohyuddin Ghishti	8,682	6.33	
Independent	Rana Shahid Sarwar	7,587	5.53	
PPP	Allah Ditta	2,084	1.52	
Others	Others (seventeen candidates)	7,273	5.29	
Turnout		141,465	56.23	
Total valid votes		137,237	97.01	
Rejected ballots		4,228	2.99	
Majority		8,999	6.56	
Registered electors		251,593		
hold				

== General elections 2018 ==
Provincial election 2018: PP-229 Vehari-I
Party	Candidate	Votes	%	±%
PML(N)	Muhammad Yousaf	40,434	33.45	
PTI	Humayon Iftikhar Chishti	26,321	21.78	
Independent	Ch. Usman Ahmad Waraich	19,063	15.77	
Independent	Salman Yousaf	7,611	6.30	
TLP	Ahmad Arslan	6,670	5.52	
Independent	Naeem ljaz	5,192	4.30	
Independent	Malik Iftikhar Hussain	4,816	3.98	
Independent	Muhammad Nadeem Sarwar	4,197	3.47	
MMA	Muhammad Naeem	1,768	1.46	
Independent	Muhammad Shahid Iqbal	1,734	1.44	
Others	Others (nine candidates)	3,067	2.54	
Turnout		124,742	57.69	
Total valid votes		120,873	96.90	
Rejected ballots		3,869	3.10	
Majority		14,113	11.67	
Registered electors		216,226		

== General elections 2013 ==
Provincial election 2013: PP-232 Vehari-I
Party	Candidate	Votes	%	±%
Independent	Chaudhary Muhammad Yousaf Kaselya	50,350	47.23	
PML(N)	Peer Ghulam Mohy Ud Din Chishti	43,751	41.04	
Independent	Chaudhary Tahir Naqash Jut	7,152	6.71	
PTI	Rana Muhammad Muzaffar	2,297	2.15	
JI	Chaudhary Rasheed Ahmad Riaz	1,047	0.98	
Others	Others (ten candidates)	2,011	1.89	
Turnout		112,397	66.50	
Total valid votes		106,608	94.85	
Rejected ballots		5,789	5.15	
Majority		6,599	6.19	
Registered electors		169,010		

== General elections 2008 ==
Contesting candidates	Party affiliation	Votes polled

- PP 232 Vehari General Election 2008 Result Information

== See also ==
- PP-228 Lodhran-IV
- PP-230 Vehari-II
