= PP-231 Vehari-III =

Constituency of the Punjabi Provincial Legislature, Pakistan

- Constituency for the Provincial Assembly of Punjab
- Region: Burewala Tehsil (partly) including Burewala city of Vehari District

Current constituency
- Created from: PP-233 Vehari-II (2002-2018); PP-230 Vehari-II (2018-2023)

PP-231 Vehari-III (پی پی-231، وہاڑی-3) is a Constituency of Provincial Assembly of Punjab.

== General elections 2024 ==
Provincial election 2024: PP-231 Vehari-III
| Party | Candidate | Votes | % | ±% |
|---|---|---|---|---|
| Independent | Khalid Zubair Nisar (Note: Filed nomination papers as PTI candidate but ECP allowed him to run as an Independent) | 50,942 | 43.75 | |
| PML(N) | Khalid Mehmood | 40,044 | 34.39 | |
| Independent | Muhammad Ashiq | 10,856 | 9.32 | |
| TLP | Sardar Zulfiqar Ahmad | 7,294 | 6.26 | |
| Independent | Ahmad Kamran | 2,673 | 2.30 | |
| Others | Others (fourteen candidates) | 4,640 | 3.98 | |
| Turnout | | 118,921 | 50.59 | |
| Total valid votes | | 116,449 | 97.92 | |
| Rejected ballots | | 2,472 | 2.08 | |
| Majority | | 10,898 | 9.36 | |
| Registered electors | | 235,081 | | |
| hold | | | | |

== General elections 2018 ==
Provincial election 2018: PP-230 Vehari-II
| Party | Candidate | Votes | % | ±% |
|---|---|---|---|---|
| PML(N) | Khalid Mehmood | 36,929 | 33.59 | |
| PTI | Khalid Zubair Nisar | 32,945 | 29.97 | |
| Independent | Irshad Ahmed | 24,342 | 22.14 | |
| Independent | Abdul Hameed Bhatti | 10,018 | 9.11 | |
| TLP | Abdul Majeed | 4,274 | 3.89 | |
| Others | Others (ten candidates) | 1,433 | 1.30 | |
| Turnout | | 112,342 | 54.17 | |
| Total valid votes | | 109,941 | 97.86 | |
| Rejected ballots | | 2,401 | 2.14 | |
| Majority | | 3,984 | 3.62 | |
| Registered electors | | 207,387 | | |

== General elections 2013 ==
Provincial election 2013: PP-233 Vehari-II
| Party | Candidate | Votes | % | ±% |
|---|---|---|---|---|
| PML(N) | Ch Irshad Ahmad Arain | 40,176 | 43.98 | |
| PTI | Muhammad Shahbaz Ahmad Dogar | 22,989 | 25.17 | |
| Independent | Ch. Usman Ahmad Warraich | 14,156 | 15.50 | |
| PPP | Alhaj Sardar Kahlid Saleem Rajpoot Bhatti | 7,345 | 8.04 | |
| Independent | Mohtarma Hajra Nazeer Jut | 4,254 | 4.66 | |
| Others | Others (twenty candidates) | 2,428 | 2.66 | |
| Turnout | | 94,143 | 57.90 | |
| Total valid votes | | 91,348 | 97.03 | |
| Rejected ballots | | 2,795 | 2.97 | |
| Majority | | 17,187 | 18.81 | |
| Registered electors | | 162,588 | | |

== General elections 2008 ==
| Contesting candidates | Party affiliation | Votes polled |

|-Alhaj Seth Sardar Khalid Saleem Rajpoot Bhatti - MPA

== See also ==
- PP-230 Vehari-II
- PP-232 Vehari-IV
