= PP-234 Vehari-VI =

Constituency of the Punjabi Provincial Legislature, Pakistan

- Constituency for the Provincial Assembly of Punjab
- Region: Vehari Tehsil (partly) of Vehari District

Current constituency
- Created from: PP-237 Vehari-VI (2002-2018); PP-234 Vehari-VI (2018-)

PP-234 Vehari-VI (پی پی-234، وہاڑی-6) is a Constituency of Provincial Assembly of Punjab.

== General elections 2024 ==
Provincial election 2024: PP-234 Vehari-VI
Party	Candidate	Votes	%	±%
PML(N)	Muhammad Naeem Akhtar Khan Bhabha	42,775	33.13	
Independent	Salman Ali Bhabha	24,325	18.84	
Independent	Muhammad Khan Khichi	23,906	18.51	
Independent	Muhammad Nadeem Akhtar (Note: Filed nomination papers as PTI candidate ECP allowed him to run as an independent)	9,173	7.10	
TLP	Shahid Mahmood	8,296	6.43	
Independent	Khizzar Hayat	8,067	6.25	
Independent	Riaz Ahmad	7,551	5.85	
Others	Others (eleven candidates)	5,028	3.89	
Turnout		132,547	54.47	
Total valid votes		129,121	97.42	
Rejected ballots		3,426	2.58	
Majority		18,450	14.29	
Registered electors		243,321		
hold				

== General elections 2018 ==
Provincial election 2018: PP-234 Vehari-VI
Party	Candidate	Votes	%	±%
PML(N)	Muhammad Saqib Khurshid	37,992	32.29	
PTI	Zahid Iqbal Ch.	34,562	29.38	
Independent	Rana Fakhar Islam	15,146	12.88	
Independent	Muhammad Afzal Khan	10,748	9.14	
TLP	Rauf Ahmad Usman	6,754	5.74	
Independent	Muhammad Iqbal	4,843	4.12	
Independent	Syed Aghaz Hussain Shah	4,368	3.71	
Independent	Muhammad Naeem Akhtar Khan	1,709	1.45	
Others	Others (seven candidates)	1,521	1.29	
Turnout		120,377	55.68	
Total valid votes		117,643	97.73	
Rejected ballots		2,734	2.27	
Majority		3,430	2.91	
Registered electors		216,179		

== General elections 2013 ==
Provincial election 2013: PP-237 Vehari-VI
Party	Candidate	Votes	%	±%
Independent	Muhammad Naeem Akhtar Khan Bhabha	45,436	47.97	
PML(N)	Muhammad Afzal Khan Khichi	34,049	35.95	
PTI	Ghulam Qasim Khan Khichi	9,379	9.90	
Independent	Tahir Haider Khan Khichi	2,126	2.24	
Others	Others (fourteen candidates)	3,727	3.93	
Turnout		97,044	63.97	
Total valid votes		94,717	97.60	
Rejected ballots		2,327	2.40	
Majority		11,387	12.02	
Registered electors		151,700		

== General elections 2008 ==
Naeem Khan Bhabha MPA in 2008 from PML-N

Contesting candidates	Party affiliation	Votes polled

== See also ==
- PP-233 Vehari-V
- PP-235 Vehari-VII
