= PP-218 Multan-VI =

Constituency of the Provincial Assembly of Punjab, Pakistan

- Constituency for the Provincial Assembly of Punjab
- Region: Multan city area (West) of Multan District

Current constituency
- Created from: PP-197 Multan-IV (2002-2018); PP-213 Multan-III (2018-2023)

PP-218 Multan-VI (پی پی-218، ملتان-6) is a Constituency of Provincial Assembly of Punjab.

== General elections 2024 ==
Provincial election 2024: PP-218 Multan-VI
Party	Candidate	Votes	%	±%
PML(N)	Muhammad Salman	45,930	40.65	
Independent	Zahoor Ahamd (Note: Filed nomination papers as PTI candidate but ECP allowed him to run as an Independent)	41,638	36.85	
PPP	Rana Sajjad Hussain	16,819	14.88	
TLP	Sajid Ismail	3,822	3.38	
Others	Others (eleven candidates)	4,789	4.24	
Turnout		126,696	45.61	
Total valid votes		112,998	89.19	
Rejected ballots		13,698	10.81	
Majority		4,292	3.80	
Registered electors		277,811		
hold				

== General elections 2018 ==
Provincial election 2018: PP-213 Multan-III
Party	Candidate	Votes	%	±%
PTI	Nawab Zada Waseem Khan Badozai	46,592	48.26	
PML(N)	Malik Muhammad Ali	27,814	28.81	
PPP	Shahid Raza	9,775	10.13	
MMA	Muhammad Safdar Iqbal	6,533	6.77	
TLP	Dilshad Ali Shah	3,858	4.00	
Independent	Sheikh Sadiq Hussain	1,038	1.08	
Others	Others (five candidates)	938	0.98	
Turnout		97,836	49.38	
Total valid votes		96,548	98.68	
Rejected ballots		1,288	1.32	
Majority		18,778	19.45	
Registered electors		198,113		

== General elections 2013 ==
Provincial election 2013: PP-197 Multan-IV
Party	Candidate	Votes	%	±%
PML(N)	M Ehsan Uddin Qureshi	28,129	37.54	
PTI	Saeed Ahmad Qureshi	26,352	35.17	
PPP	Muhammad Javaid Sidiqi	9,751	13.01	
Independent	Malik Rizwan Abid Thaeem	7,804	10.42	
Others	Others (thirty candidates)	2,891	3.86	
Turnout		75,837	54.21	
Total valid votes		74,927	98.80	
Rejected ballots		910	1.20	
Majority		1,777	2.37	
Registered electors		139,892		

== General elections 2008 ==
Contesting candidates	Party affiliation	Votes polled

== See also ==
- PP-217 Multan-V
- PP-219 Multan-VII
