= Assad Murtaza Gilani =

Pakistani politician and parliamentarian

Makhdoomzada Syed Asad Murtaza Gilani

Member of Parliament
- In office 10 October 2002 – 18 February 2008

Personal details
- Born: 19 February 1968 Multan, Pakistan
- Died: 24 September 2015 (aged 47) Mina, Mecca, Saudi Arabia
- Education: Law degree
- Alma mater: University of the Punjab
- Profession: Lawyer and agriculturist

Makhdoomzada Syed Asad Murtaza Gilani (19 February 1968 – 24 September 2015) was a Pakistani politician and parliamentarian. He was elected as a member of the National Assembly of Pakistan on a ticket of the Pakistan Peoples Party from Multan Constituency NA-152 in the 2002 Pakistani general election. Gilani was the nephew of former Prime Minister Yousuf Raza Gilani. He died in the 2015 Mina disaster which killed at least 2,262 people.
