= Syed Ashiq Hussain Bukhari =

Pakistani politician

- سید عاشق حسین بخاری

Member of the National Assembly of Pakistan
- In office 2008–2014
- Constituency: NA-153 (Multan-VI)

Personal details
- Party: PTI (2026-present)
- Other political affiliations: IND (2024-2026); PMLN (2013); PML(Q) (2008)

Syed Ashiq Hussain Bukhari (Urdu: سید عاشق حسین بخاری) is a Pakistani politician who had been a member of the National Assembly of Pakistan from 2008 to 2014.

== Political career ==
Bukhari was elected to the National Assembly of Pakistan as a candidate of Pakistan Muslim League (Q) (PML-Q) from Constituency NA-153 (Multan-VI) in the 2008 Pakistani general election. He received 69,246 votes and defeated Rana Muhammad Qasim Noon.

He was re-elected to the National Assembly as a candidate of Pakistan Muslim League (N) (PML-N) from Constituency NA-153 (Multan-IV) in the 2013 Pakistani general election. He received 94,413 votes and defeated Rana Muhammad Qasim Noon.

In 2014, he was denotified as member of the National Assembly after he was disqualified to continue in office because of fake degree case.
