= PP-216 Multan-IV =

Constituency of Punjab, Pakistan

- Constituency for the Provincial Assembly of Punjab
- Region: Multan city area (East) of Multan District

Current constituency
- Created from: PP-195 Multan-II (2002-2018); PP-215 Multan-V (2018-2023)

PP-216 Multan-IV (پی پی-216، ملتان-4) is a Constituency of Provincial Assembly of Punjab.

== General elections 2024 ==
Provincial election 2024: PP-216 Multan-IV
Party	Candidate	Votes	%	±%
Independent	Muhammad Adnan Dogar (Note: Filed nomination papers as PTI candidate but ECP allowed him to run as an Independent)	59,289	52.72	
PML(N)	Babar Hussain	28,290	25.15	
Independent	Imran Hussain Arshad	5,828	5.18	
TLP	Muhammad Shahab Ali Khan	5,472	4.87	
PPP	Syed Ghulam Mustafa Shahzad	4,559	4.05	
JI	Muhammad Aslam	3,031	2.70	
Independent	Amjad Ali	2,295	2.04	
Others	Others (twenty three candidates)	3,707	3.29	
Turnout		113,985	42.86	
Total valid votes		112,471	98.67	
Rejected ballots		1,514	1.33	
Majority		30,999	27.57	
Registered electors		265,943		
hold				

== General elections 2018 ==
Provincial election 2018: PP-215 Multan-V
Party	Candidate	Votes	%	±%
PTI	Javaid Akhter	51,703	53.03	
PML(N)	Muhammad Amir Manzoor	31,151	31.95	
TLP	Hafiz Moeen Ud Din Khalid	4,012	4.12	
Independent	Ashfaq Ahmad	3,907	4.01	
PPP	Mushtaq Ahmad	2,738	2.81	
AAT	Muhammad Imran	1,543	1.58	
MMA	Abdul Raheem	1,165	1.20	
Others	Others (five candidates)	1,282	1.32	
Turnout		98,638	48.85	
Total valid votes		97,501	98.85	
Rejected ballots		1,137	1.15	
Majority		20,552	21.08	
Registered electors		201,933		

== General elections 2013 ==
Provincial election 2013: PP-195 Multan-II
Party	Candidate	Votes	%	±%
PML(N)	Peer Zada Mian Shazad Maqbool Bhutta	32,112	39.79	
PTI	Nawab Zada Waseem Khan Bado Zai	29,728	36.84	
PPP	Muhammad Adnan Dogar	12,204	15.12	
Independent	Shakeel Hussain Labar	2,224	2.76	
JI	Iftar Ali Iftikhar	1,131	1.40	
Others	Others (twenty six candidates)	3,295	4.08	
Turnout		82,110	56.01	
Total valid votes		80,694	98.28	
Rejected ballots		1,416	1.72	
Majority		2,384	2.95	
Registered electors		146,597		

== See also ==
- PP-215 Multan-III
- PP-217 Multan-V
