= Vehari =

Pakistani town

Vehari وِہاڑی
- City
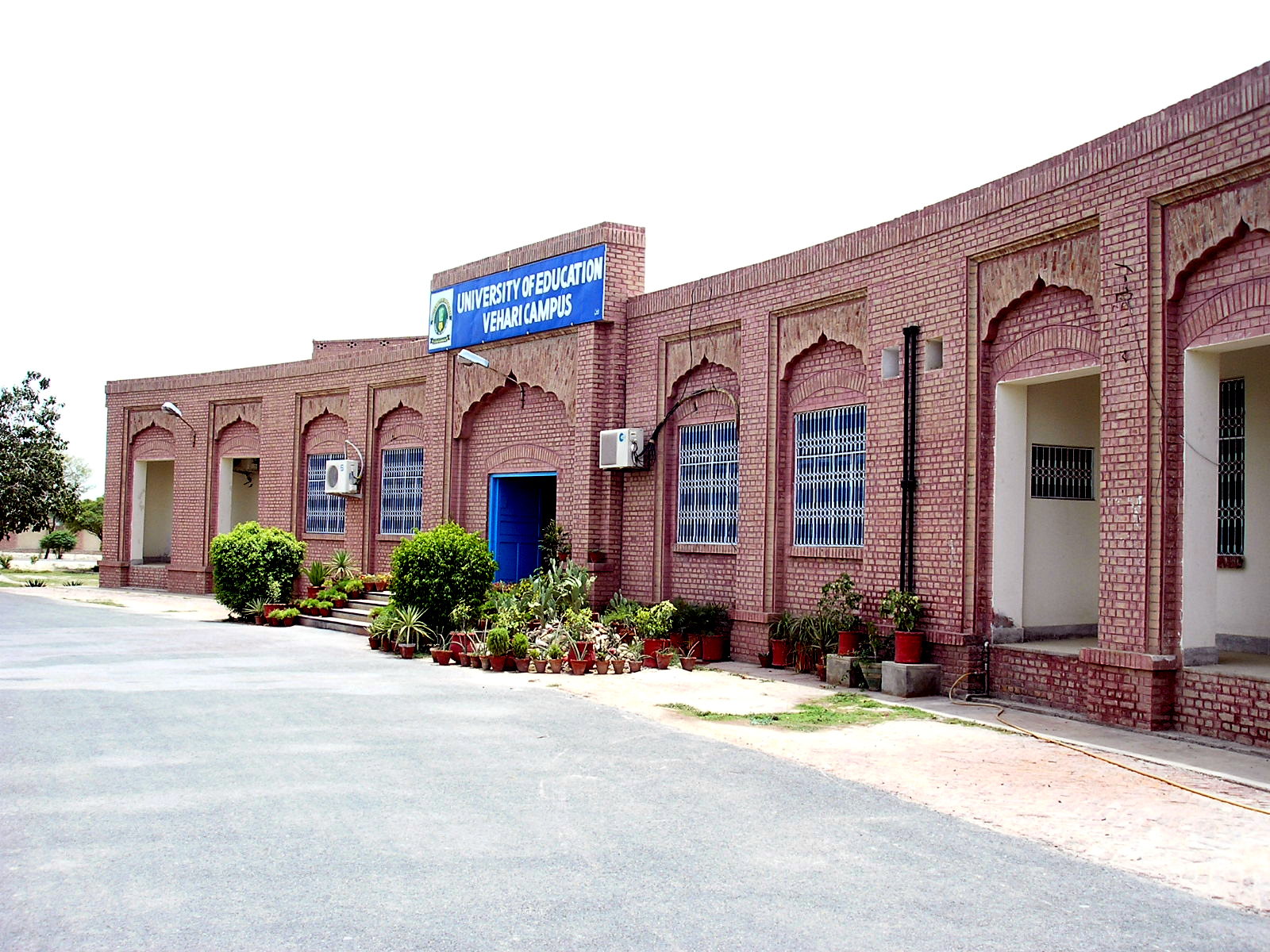
- University of Education

- Location in Punjab, Pakistan Vehari (Pakistan)
- Coordinates: 30°2′31″N 72°21′10″E
- Country: Pakistan
- Province: (Punjab, Pakistan) Punjab
- Division: Multan
- District: Vehari

Government
  - Type: Municipal Committee
  - Chief officer: Mr. Ali Ahmad
  - Administrator/Deputy Commissioner: Khalid Javeed Goraya

Area
  - City: 20 km^{2} (7.7 sq mi)

Population (2023)
  - City: 210,288
  - Rank: 51st in Pakistan
  - Density: 11,000/km^{2} (27,000/sq mi)
- Time zone: UTC+5 (PST)
- Dialling code: 067

Vehari, (Note: وِہاڑی) also spelled Vihari, is a city and the headquarters of Vehari District in the Punjab province of Pakistan. It is Pakistan's 62nd largest city. Vehari is about 100 km (62 mi) from the historical city of Multan. Vehari is located at the Multan-Delhi Road constructed by Emperor Sher Shah Suri. It is at an altitude of 135 m (443 ft).

== Demographics ==
Population

Historical population

Year	Pop.	±% p.a.
1951	8,986	—
1961	15,410	+5.54%
1972	28,246	+5.66%
1981	53,799	+7.42%

Year	Pop.	±% p.a.
1998	94,343	+3.36%
2017	145,464	+2.31%
2023	210,288	+6.34%

According to 2023 census, Vehari had a population of 210,288.

Languages

Languages of Vehari MC (2023 Census)
1. Punjabi (84.3%)
2. Urdu (13.7%)
3. Others (2.00%)

== Geography ==
It is 96 km (60 mi) from the regional metropolis of Multan, 956 km (594 mi) from Karachi, 300 km (190 mi) from Lahore, 218 km (135 mi) from Faisalabad, 119 km (74 mi) from Bahawalpur, 61 km (38 mi) from Hasilpur, 41 km (25 mi) from Mailsi, 46 km (29 mi) from Kacha Khuh, 36 km (22 mi) from Burewala, 27 km (17 mi) from Luddan, 78 km (48 mi) from Arifwala, 112 km (70 mi) from Pakpattan, and about 37 km (23 mi) north of the river Sutlej – the southernmost of the five rivers of the Punjab region. Islam Headworks is on this river near Luddan on the Luddan-Vehari canal providing irrigation water to both banks of the river, which includes the upper fringes of the Cholistan Desert.

== Agriculture ==
Vehari is known to be a city of cotton, among other crops. Vehari has dozens of cotton processing factories and cottonseed oil manufacturing plants; sugarcane farming and processing is also common. Agricultural products include mangoes in the summer and guava and other citrus fruits orange in the winter.

The summer in Vehari is extremely hot; the weather became pleasant during October and February but in recent years it has been reduced to barely three months from December to February. During the summers, temperature hit 45 to 50 degree Celsius on a regular basis. The rainfall is very light throughout the year in Vehari. Recent years have seen Vehari struggle for rainfall even during the usually busy monsoon season. When rainfall is light rainfall the land is generally arid and dusty.

== History ==
Vehari District was created in 1976 when it was separated from Multan District.

During the era of the Indus Valley civilization, the area now comprising Vehari District was a fertile agricultural region with pockets of forest. In the Vedic period, the region saw the settlement and influence of various Indo-Aryan peoples, including the Abhiras, Kambojas, Daradas, Kaikayas, Madras, Pauravas, Yaudheyas, Malavas, and Kurus.

Following the conquest of the Achaemenid Empire in 331 BCE, Alexander the Great marched into the present-day Punjab region with an army of 50,000. Subsequently, the area was ruled by a succession of empires and kingdoms, including the Maurya Empire, Indo-Greek Kingdom, Kushan Empire, Gupta Empire, White Huns, Kushano-Hephthalites, and the Turk Shahi and Hindu Shahi dynasties.

In 997 CE, Mahmud of Ghazni assumed control of the Ghaznavid dynasty, established by his father, Sebuktegin. In 1005 CE, Mahmud conquered the Hindu Shahi rulers in Kabul and subsequently extended his rule to the Punjab region. The area later came under the control of the Delhi Sultanate and then the Mughal Empire.

After the decline of the Mughals, the region was occupied by the Sikh Empire. Under the British Raj, Vehari saw an increase in population and agricultural development.

The modern development of Vehari District began with the construction of the Pakpattan Canal from the Sulemanki Headworks on the Sutlej River and the initiation of the Nili Bar Colony project in 1925—named for the bluish tint of the Sutlej's waters. Historically, habitation was mainly along the riverbanks, where seasonal floods enabled limited agriculture. The interior regions were mostly sandy wasteland used for grazing by nomadic herders.

During the reign of Akbar, the riparian tract in the area formed the state of Fatehpur, ruled by Fateh Khan of the Joya family, who founded the town of Fatehpur—still extant approximately 15 km south of Mailsi. This is considered the oldest town in the Mailsi subdivision and retains some archaeological significance.

After the Partition of India in 1947, the Hindu and Sikh minorities migrated to India, while Muslim refugees from India settled in Vehari District.

Prominent castes in the district include Rao Rajput, Jatt, Dhudhi Rajput, Joyia Rajput, Sheikh, Bhatti Rajput, Baloch, Khokhar, Daha, Gujjar, Aheer, Arain, Sial, Awan, and Langrial.

== Education ==
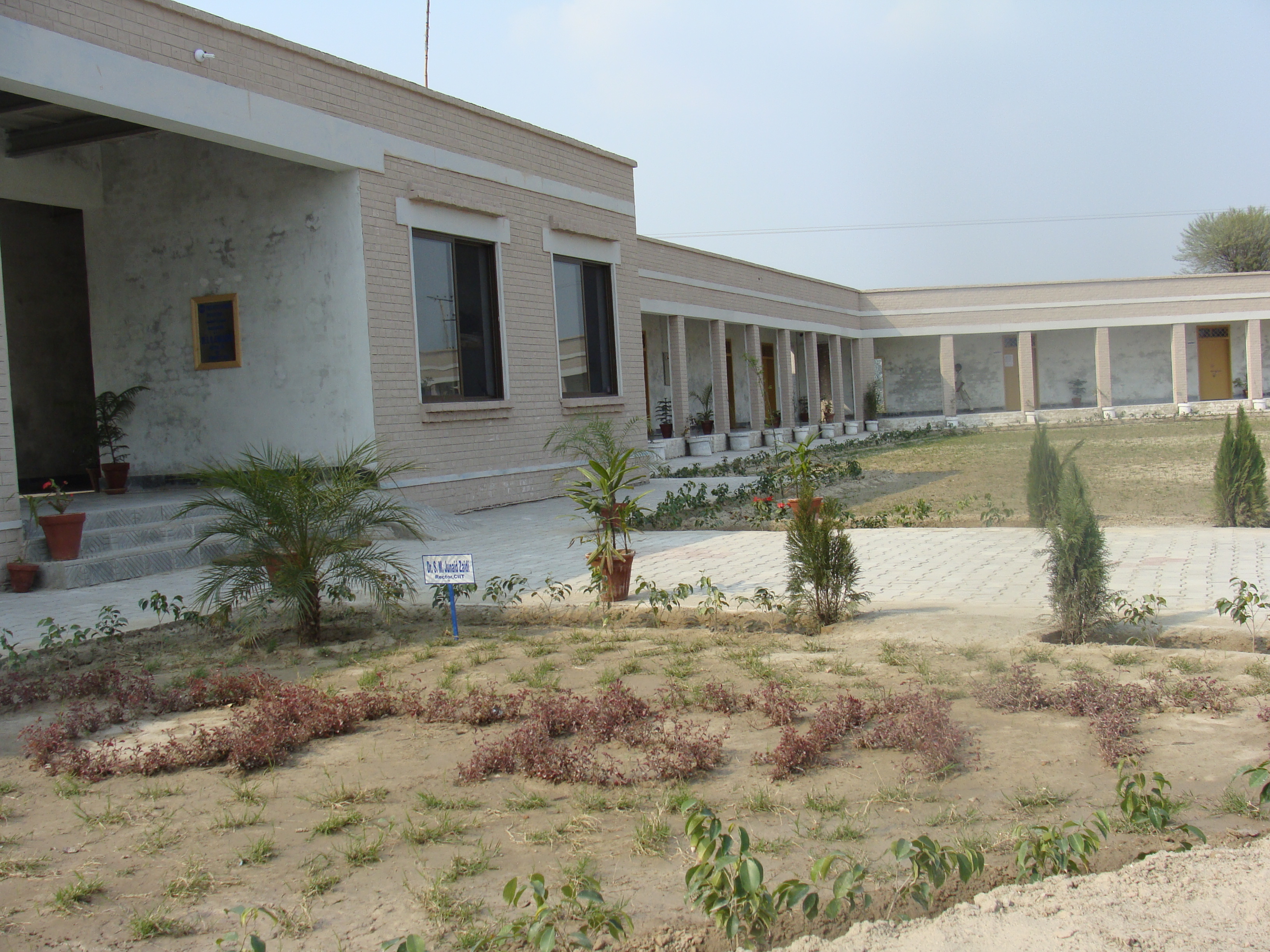
COMSATS University, Vehari Campus

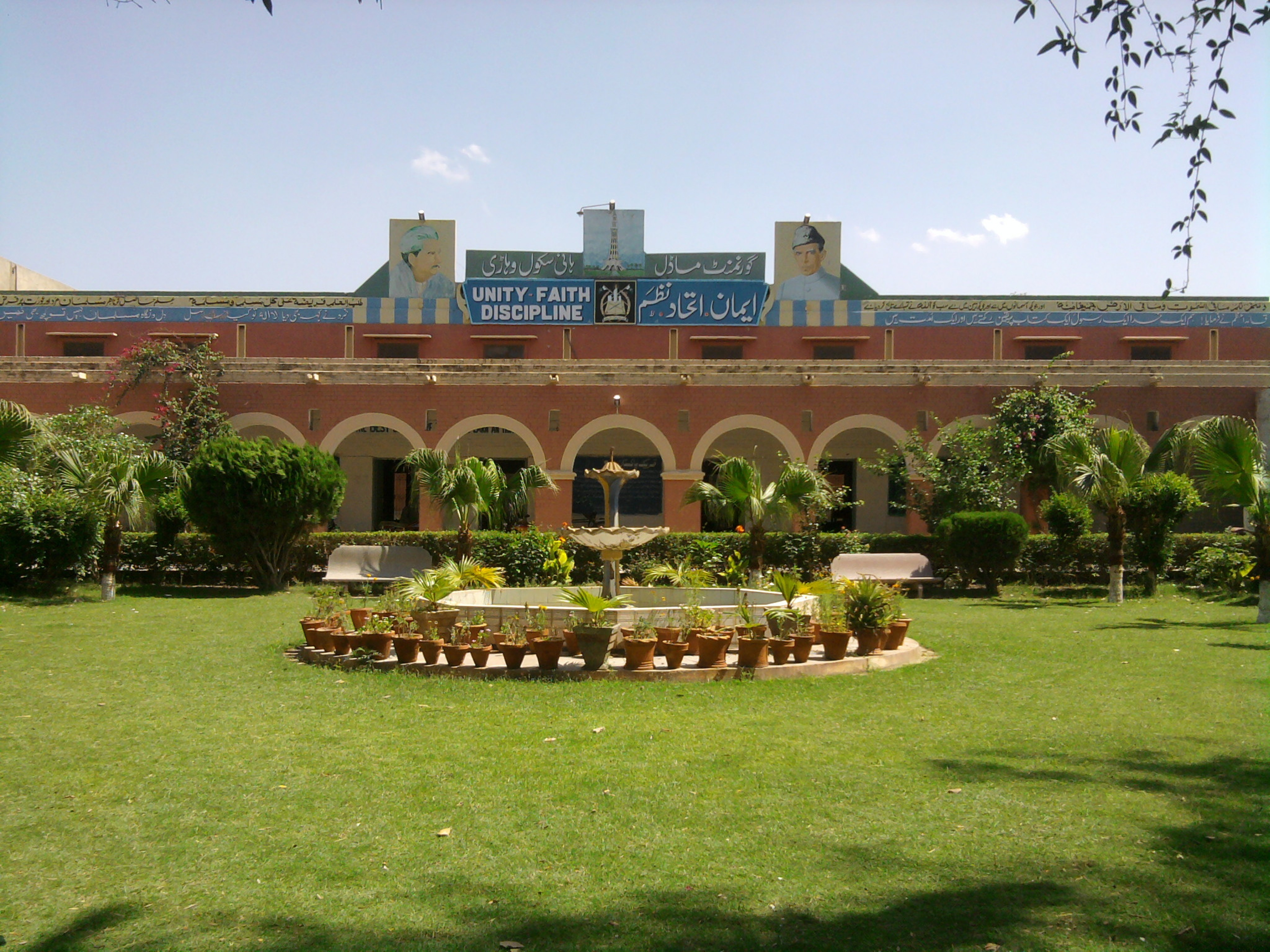
Government Model High School, Vehari

City has two full-fledged university campuses and two post-graduate colleges for men and women. COMSATS University, Vehari Campus is offering MS and BS programs since 2009. Virtual University Campus is working at Vehari since 2001. The city contains many higher secondary schools and private colleges. Education University is a government-funded and operated campus with more than four faculties and many departments. COMSATS University, Vehari Campus is public sector university funded by ministry of Science and Technology. Pakistan's leading university, University of Agriculture Faisalabad (UAF), Bahaudin Zikriya University Multan, University of Education and Allama Iqbal Open University has a sub-campus in Vehari.

== Transport ==
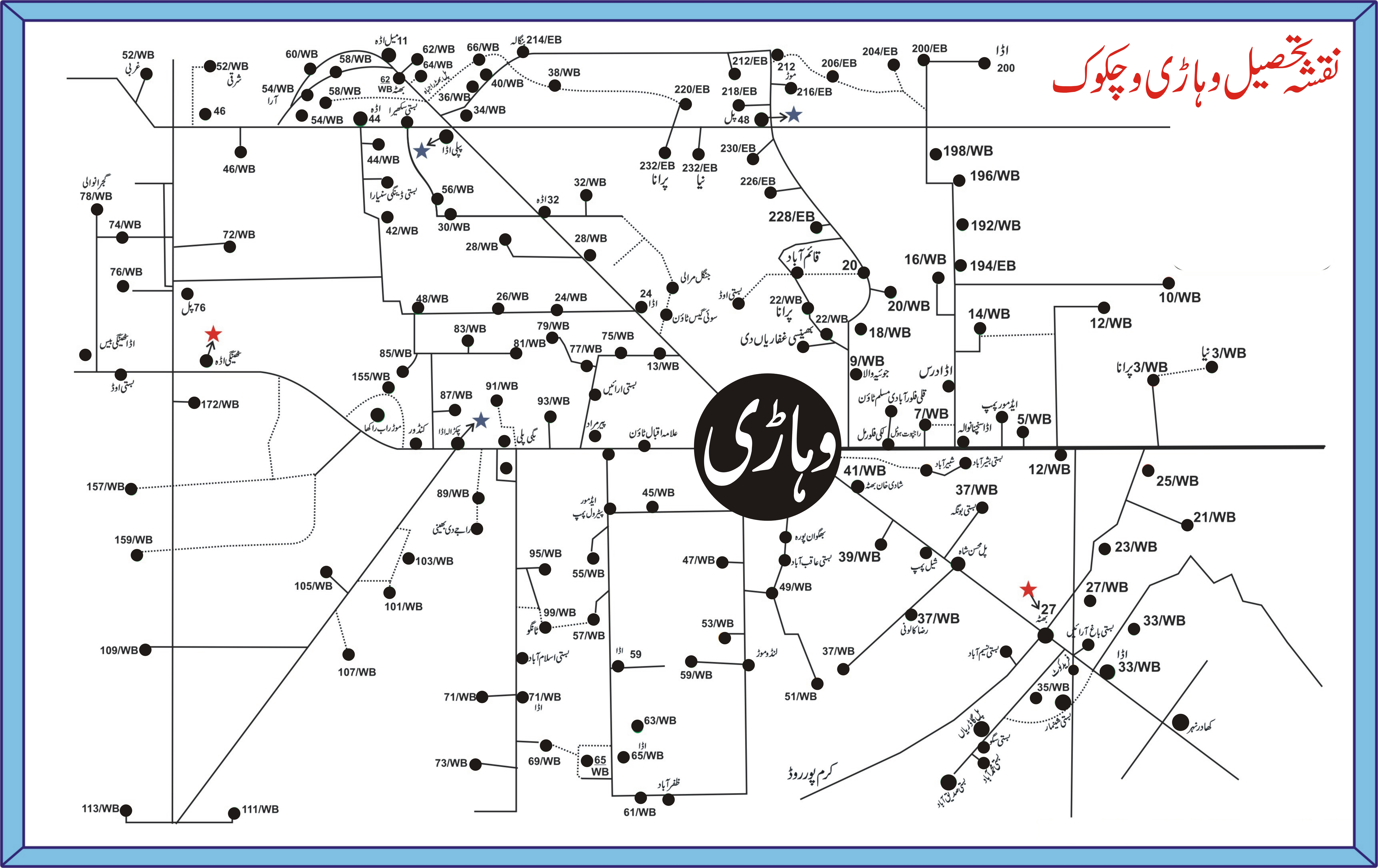
Tehsil Vehari and villages

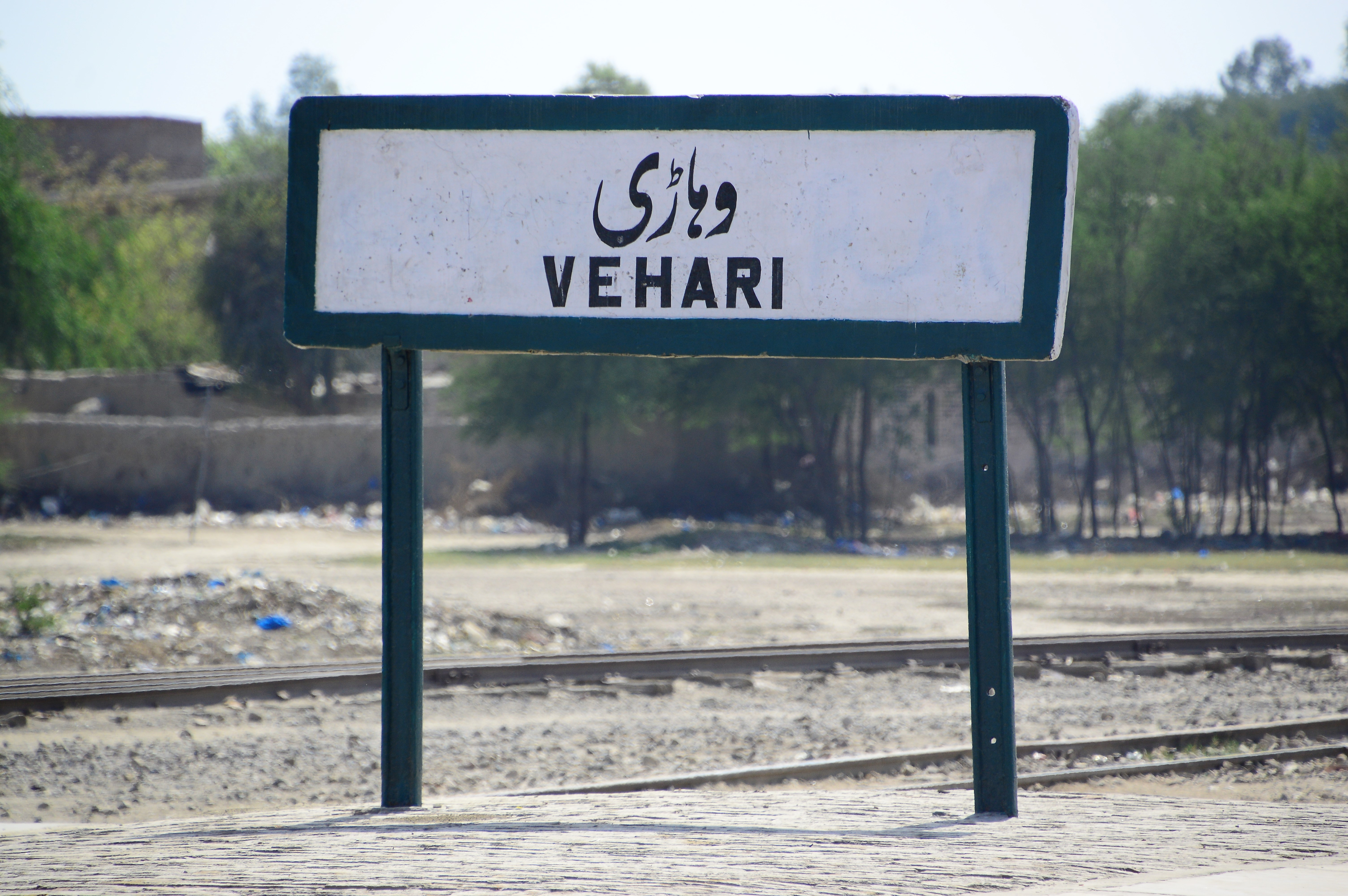
Vehari railway station

Vehari is on the southern alternate route of railway and road between Multan and Lahore, the capital of the province.

The northern route is the main route. Both run roughly in a northeasterly direction, almost parallel to each other and only 20 to 30 miles apart at any point. A section of the railway between Multan and Lahore was electrified on the main line between Khanewal and Lahore during the 1960s; however, in subsequent decades and lately with rapid decline and deterioration of the infrastructure of Pakistan Railway (PR), the electrified section lies in ruins and is not likely to be restored in the foreseeable future. With the new motorway between Multan and Lahore which was due to be completed sometimes in the early part of 2014, Vehari is set to benefit from its proximity to its north.

== Culture ==
The Vehari route goes to Lahore through the religious city of Pakpattan, where the Sufi Saint Syedna Fariduddin Ganjshakar رحمه الله is buried. Thousands of pilgrims come annually to Pakpattan for the saint's Urs celebration which include all sorts of festivities. Selections from his work are included in the Guru Granth Sahib, the Sikh sacred scripture. He was commonly known as "Baba Farid". Power Radio FM 99 has a station for Vehari.

== Climate ==
The climate of the district is hot and dry in summer and cold in winter Amin et al. (2017). The maximum and minimum temperature ranges between 45 °C and 28 °C in summer. During winter, the temperature fluctuates between 21 °C and 5 °C.

Vehari

Climate chart (precipitation, max. and min. temperature)
J	F	M	A	M	J	J	A	S	O	N	D
23 20 6	29 22 9	41 27 14	20 34 20	22 39 24	36 40 27	202 36 27	164 35 26	61 35 24	12 33 18	4 27 12	14 22 7
- █ Average max. and min. temperatures in °C
- █ Precipitation totals in mm
- Source: HKO
Imperial conversion
J	F	M	A	M	J	J	A	S	O	N	D
0.9 68 43	1.1 72 48	1.6 81 57	0.8 93 67	0.9 101 75	1.4 105 81	8 97 80	6.5 95 80	2.4 95 76	0.5 91 65	0.2 81 53	0.6 71 44
- █ Average max. and min. temperatures in °F
- █ Precipitation totals in inches

== Notable personalities ==
- Mian Khurshid Anwar, assembly member
- Mian Muhammad Saqib Khurshid, MPA Vehari
- Mohammad Irfan, Pakistan cricket team player
- Saleem Sherwani, hockey player
- Syed Sajid Mehdi, MNA Vehari
- Tahir Iqbal Chaudhry, MNA Vehari
- Tehmina Daultana, MNA Vehari
- Waqar Younis, former Pakistan Cricket Team player and head coach
- Waseem Ahmed, former captain, Pakistan Hockey Team
