= Vehari Tehsil =

Vehari Tehsil تحصِيل وِہاڑى
- Tehsil
- Location of Vehari Tehsil in Punjab, Pakistan
- Country: Pakistan
- Region: (Punjab, Pakistan) Punjab
- District: Vehari
- Capital: Vehari
- Union councils: 33

Area
  - Tehsil: 1,419 km^{2} (548 sq mi)

Population (2017)
  - Tehsil: 928,166
  - Urban: 145,464
  - Rural: 782,702
- Time zone: UTC+5 (PST)
  - Summer (DST): UTC+6 (PDT)

Vehari Tehsil (Urdu: تحصِيل وِہاڑى), is an administrative subdivision (tehsil), of Vehari District in the Punjab province of Pakistan. The city of Vehari is the headquarters of the tehsil, which is administratively subdivided into 26 Union Councils.

== Administration ==
The tehsil of Vehari is administratively subdivided into 26 Union Councils, these are:

Hak NoC
- 541/EB
- 533/EB
- 537/EB
- 56/WB
- 561/EB
- 58/WB
- Kachi Mandi
- 75/WB
- 78/WB
- 37/WB
- 95/WB
- Hassan Abad
- Budh Ghulam
- Dad Kamera
- Karim Wah
- Luddan
- SharIfabad
- Taimoor Shaheed
- Vehari-I
- Vehari-II (Danewal)
- Vehari-III (9.-11/WB)
