= Jalalpur Pirwala Tehsil =

Jalalpur Pirwala Tehsil تحصیل جلال پور پیروالہ تحصیل جلالپور پیروالا
- Tehsil
- Interactive map of Jalalpur Pirwala Tehsil
- Country: Pakistan
- Region: (Punjab, Pakistan) Punjab
- District: Multan

Population (2017)
  - Tehsil: 554,152
  - Urban: 67,651
  - Rural: 486,501
- Time zone: UTC+5 (PKT)

Jalalpur Pirwala is a tehsil located in Multan District, Punjab, Pakistan. The population is 554,152 according to the 2017 census.

== See also ==
- List of tehsils of Punjab, Pakistan
