= Shujabad Tehsil =

Shujabad Tehsil تحصیل شجاع آباد
- Tehsil
- Interactive map of Shujabad Tehsil
- Country: Pakistan
- Region: (Punjab, Pakistan) Punjab
- District: Multan

Population (2017)
  - Tehsil: 609,631
  - Urban: 529,596
  - Rural: 80,035
- Time zone: UTC+5 (PKT)

Shujabad is a tehsil located in Multan District, Punjab, Pakistan. The population is 609,631 according to the 2017 census.

== See also ==
- List of tehsils of Punjab, Pakistan
