= Multan Saddar Tehsil =

Multan Saddar Tehsil تحصیل ملتان صدر
- Tehsil
- Interactive map of Multan Saddar Tehsil
- Country: Pakistan
- Region: (Punjab, Pakistan) Punjab
- District: Multan

Population (2017)
  - Tehsil: 1,322,756
  - Urban: 1,238,698
  - Rural: 84,058
- Time zone: UTC+5 (PKT)

Multan Saddar is a tehsil located in Multan District, Punjab, Pakistan. The population is 1,322,756 according to the 2017 census.

== See also ==
- List of tehsils of Punjab, Pakistan
