= Multan District =

Multan ضِلع مُلتان
- District of Punjab
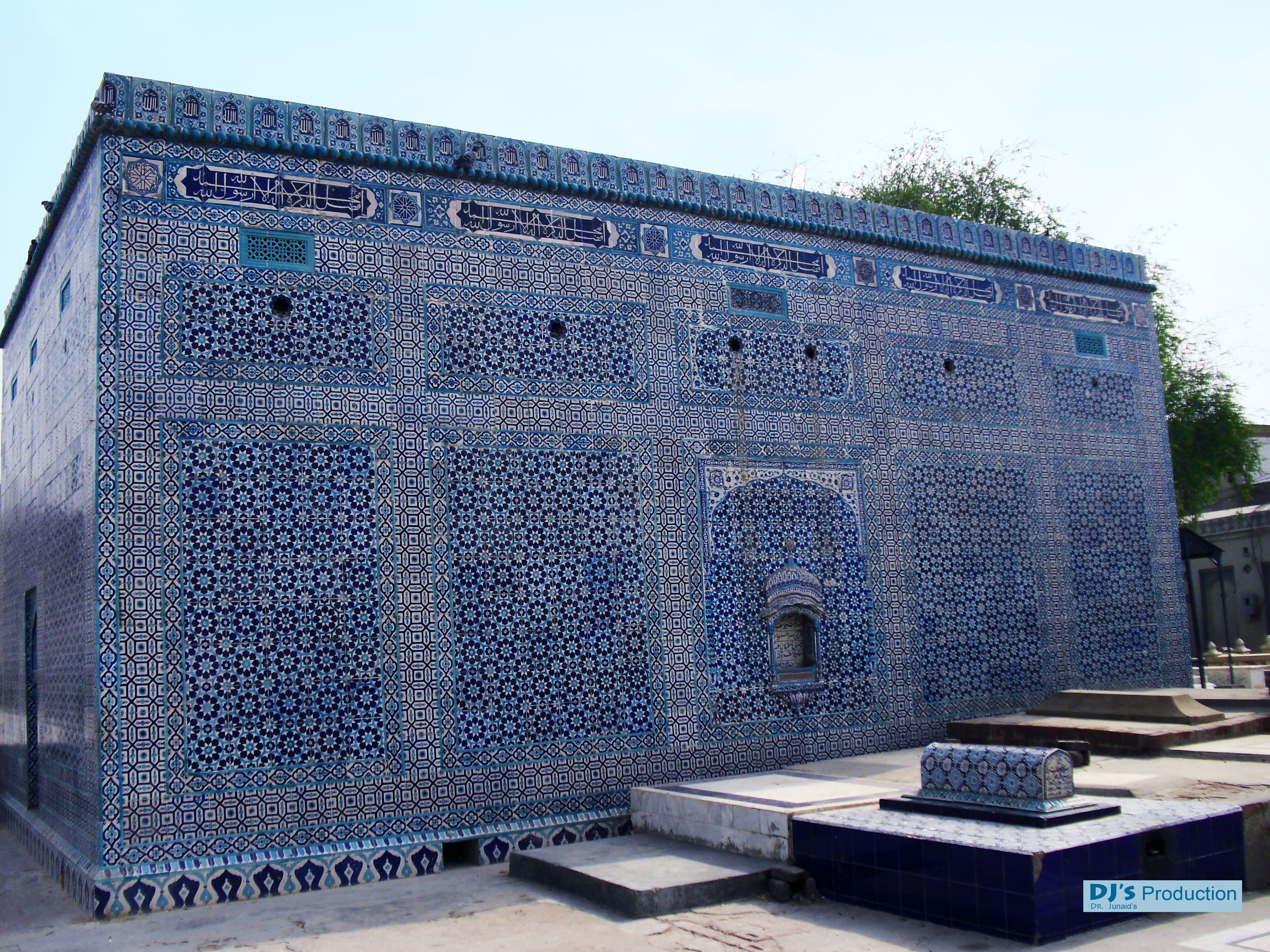
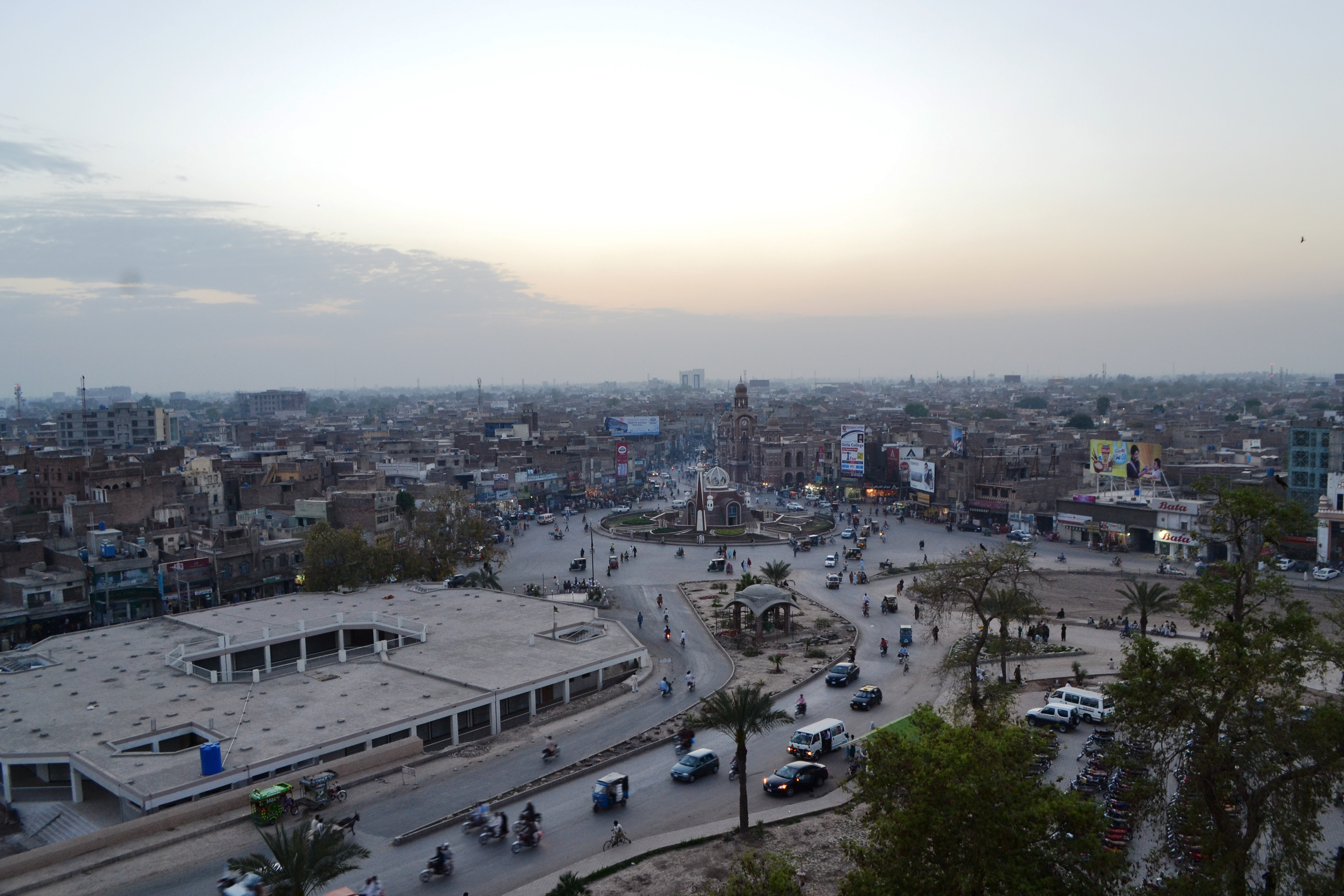
- Top: Multan Arts Council; Bottom: Aerial view of Ghanta Ghar Chowk

- Map of Multan District
- Coordinates: 29°56′N 71°22′E
- Country: Pakistan
- Province: Punjab
- Division: Multan
- Headquarters: Multan
- Number of Tehsils: 4

Government
  - Type: District Administration
  - Mayor: None (vacant)
  - Deputy Commissioner: Mudasir Riaz Malik (BPS-19 PAS)
  - District Police Officer: Mansoorul Haq Rana (BPS-19 PSP)

Area
  - District of Punjab: 3,720 km^{2} (1,440 sq mi)

Population (2023)
  - District of Punjab: 5,362,305
  - Density: 1,440/km^{2} (3,730/sq mi)
  - Urban: 2,499,871 (46.62%)
  - Rural: 2,862,434 (53.38%)

Literacy
  - Literacy rate: Total: (61.41%); Male: (67.28%); Female: (55.27%)
- Time zone: UTC+5 (PKT)
- Languages: Saraiki, Punjabi, Urdu
- Website: multan.punjab.gov.pk

Multan District (Urdu: ضِلع مُلتان), is a district in the province of Punjab, Pakistan. Its capital is the city of Multan. The district has a population of 5.45 million (as of 2024) and an area of 3,720 square kilometres. The district consists of tehsils of Multan saddar, Multan city, Jalalpur Pirwala and Shujabad.

History

Multan district was created during British rule in 19th century. Vehari, Khanewal and Lodhran were Tehsils of Multan district. Vehari was made separate district in 1976. Khanewal was cut off from Multan and made a separate district in 1985. Lodhran was split off as a separate district from Multan in 1991.

== Location ==
Multan District is surrounded by the Khanewal to the North and North East, the Vehari to the East and Lodhran to the South. The Chenab River passes on its Western side, across which lies Muzaffargarh. Bahawalpur district is to the south across the Sutlej.

== Administration ==
The district is administratively divided into the following tehsils (subdivisions):

Tehsil	Area (km²)	Pop. (2023)	Density (ppl/km²) (2023)	Literacy rate (2023)	Union Councils
Jalalpur Pirwala	978	608,488	622.18	38.50%	...
Multan City	304	2,555,486	8,406.20	73.65%	...
Multan Saddar	1,632	1,516,004	928.92	52.01%	...
Shujabad	806	682,327	846.56	53.87%	...

== Demographics ==
=== Population ===
Historical population
Year	Pop.	±% p.a.
1951	725,131	—
1961	983,815	+3.10%
1972	1,506,223	+3.95%
1981	1,970,075	+3.03%
1998	3,116,851	+2.74%
2017	4,746,166	+2.24%
2023	5,362,305	+2.06%

As of the 2023 census, Multan district has 886,392 households and a population of 5,362,305. The district has a sex ratio of 103.77 males to 100 females and a literacy rate of 61.41%: 67.28% for males and 55.27% for females. 1,398,159 (26.18% of the surveyed population) are under 10 years of age. 2,499,871 (46.62%) live in urban areas.

=== Religion ===
Religion in Multan district (2023)
Religion	Percent
Islam	99.15%
Christianity	0.79%
Other or not stated	0.06%

Religion in contemporary Multan District
Religious group	1941		2017		2023	
Religious group	Pop.	%	Pop.	%	Pop.	%
Islam	428,659	79.4%	4,716,267	99.37%	5,295,315	99.15%
Hinduism (Note: 1931-1941: Including Ad-Dharmis)	101,985	18.89%	2,366	0.05%	1,709	0.03%
Sikhism	6,802	1.26%	—N/a	—N/a	120	0%
Christianity	1,012	0.19%	25,693	0.54%	42,155	0.79%
Ahmadi	—N/a	—N/a	1,665	0.04%	1,105	0.02%
Others	1,428	0.26%	175	0%	358	0.01%
Total Population	539,886	100%	4,746,166	100%	5,340,762	100%
Note: 1941 census data is for Multan and Shujabad tehsils of Multan District, which roughly corresponds to contemporary Multan district. District and tehsil borders have changed since 1941.

Religious groups in Multan District (British Punjab province era)
Religious group	1881		1891		1901		1911		1921		1931		1941	
Religious group	Pop.	%	Pop.	%	Pop.	%	Pop.	%	Pop.	%	Pop.	%	Pop.	%
Islam	435,901	78.97%	503,962	79.81%	570,254	80.25%	665,488	81.67%	731,605	82.18%	942,937	80.26%	1,157,911	78.01%
Hinduism	112,001	20.29%	122,714	19.43%	133,560	18.79%	126,603	15.54%	134,013	15.05%	182,029	15.49%	249,872	16.83%
Sikhism	2,085	0.38%	2,832	0.45%	4,662	0.66%	19,881	2.44%	18,562	2.08%	39,453	3.36%	61,628	4.15%
Christianity	1,861	0.34%	1,892	0.3%	1,964	0.28%	2,441	0.3%	6,006	0.67%	9,924	0.84%	14,290	0.96%
Zoroastrianism	63	0.01%	9	0%	52	0.01%	58	0.01%	47	0.01%	117	0.01%	77	0.01%
Jainism	47	0.01%	24	0%	134	0.02%	394	0.05%	28	0%	440	0.04%	552	0.04%
Buddhism	0	0%	0	0%	0	0%	0	0%	0	0%	0	0%	0	0%
Judaism	—N/a	—N/a	0	0%	0	0%	6	0%	3	0%	0	0%	3	0%
Others	6	0%	1	0%	0	0%	0	0%	0	0%	0	0%	0	0%
Total population	551,964	100%	631,434	100%	710,626	100%	814,871	100%	890,264	100%	1,174,900	100%	1,484,333	100%
Note: British Punjab province era district borders are not an exact match in the present-day due to various bifurcations to district borders — which since created new districts — throughout the historic Punjab Province region during the post-independence era that have taken into account population increases.

Religion in the Tehsils of Multan District (1921)
Tehsil	Islam		Hinduism		Sikhism		Christianity		Jainism		Others (Note: Including Buddhism, Zoroastrianism, Judaism, Tribals, others, or not stated)		Total	
Tehsil	Pop.	%	Pop.	%	Pop.	%	Pop.	%	Pop.	%	Pop.	%	Pop.	%
Multan Tehsil	196,963	80.93%	40,945	16.82%	3,250	1.34%	2,149	0.88%	28	0.01%	50	0.02%	243,385	100%
Shujabad Tehsil	111,051	84.07%	20,418	15.46%	610	0.46%	12	0.01%	0	0%	0	0%	132,091	100%
Lodhran Tehsil	103,838	82.84%	21,197	16.91%	311	0.25%	7	0.01%	0	0%	0	0%	125,353	100%
Mailsi Tehsil	99,191	87.07%	13,079	11.48%	1,657	1.45%	0	0%	0	0%	0	0%	113,927	100%
Khanewal Tehsil	94,274	74.16%	21,619	17.01%	7,431	5.85%	3,807	2.99%	0	0%	0	0%	127,131	100%
Kabirwala Tehsil	126,288	85.11%	16,755	11.29%	5,303	3.57%	31	0.02%	0	0%	0	0%	148,377	100%
Note: British Punjab province era tehsil borders are not an exact match in the present-day due to various bifurcations to tehsil borders — which since created new tehsils — throughout the historic Punjab Province region during the post-independence era that have taken into account population increases.

Religion in the Tehsils of Multan District (1941)
Tehsil	Islam		Hinduism		Sikhism		Christianity		Jainism		Others (Note: Including Anglo-Indian Christians, British Christians, Buddhism, Zoroastrianism, Judaism, Tribals, others, or not stated)		Total	
Tehsil	Pop.	%	Pop.	%	Pop.	%	Pop.	%	Pop.	%	Pop.	%	Pop.	%
Multan Tehsil	273,637	76.07%	78,566	21.84%	5,225	1.45%	871	0.24%	499	0.14%	929	0.26%	359,727	100%
Shujabad Tehsil	155,022	86.05%	23,419	13%	1,577	0.88%	141	0.08%	0	0%	0	0%	180,159	100%
Lodhran Tehsil	175,642	82.59%	33,246	15.63%	3,519	1.65%	218	0.1%	1	0%	48	0.02%	212,674	100%
Mailsi Tehsil	213,413	75.92%	43,866	15.6%	21,131	7.52%	2,679	0.95%	18	0.01%	2	0%	281,109	100%
Khanewal Tehsil	176,892	70.06%	41,908	16.6%	24,380	9.66%	9,142	3.62%	34	0.01%	115	0.05%	252,471	100%
Kabirwala Tehsil	163,305	82.4%	28,867	14.57%	5,796	2.92%	219	0.11%	0	0%	6	0%	198,193	100%
Note1: British Punjab province era tehsil borders are not an exact match in the present-day due to various bifurcations to tehsil borders — which since created new tehsils — throughout the historic Punjab Province region during the post-independence era that have taken into account population increases. Note2: Tehsil religious breakdown figures for Christianity only includes local Christians, labeled as "Indian Christians" on census. Does not include Anglo-Indian Christians or British Christians, who were classified under "Other" category.

=== Language ===
Languages of Multan district (2023)
1. Saraiki (63.9%)
2. Urdu (17.7%)
3. Punjabi (16.0%)
4. Mewati (0.94%)
5. Others (1.45%)

At the time of the 2023 census, 63.89% of the population spoke Saraiki, 17.72% Urdu, 16.00% Punjabi and 0.94% Mewati as their first language.

== Tehsils ==
1. Jalalpur Pirwala
2. Multan City
3. Multan Saddar
4. Shujabad

== History ==
Multan district was annexed by the British from its former Sikh rulers after the Second Anglo-Sikh War of 1848–1849.
