= Sardarpur Jhandir =

Pakistani village

Sardarpur Jhandir سردارپور جھنڈیر
- City District
- Nickname: Town of Library
- Location in Pakistan
- Coordinates: 29°46′24″N 72°01′18″E
- Country: Pakistan
- Region: Punjab
- District: Vehari District
- Established: 1940

Government
  - Famous: Sardar Masood Jhandir

Area
  - Total: 28 km^{2} (11 sq mi)
- Elevation: 130 m (430 ft)

Population (2019)
  - Total: 10,000
- Time zone: UTC+5 (PST)
- Postal code: 59150
- Area code: 067

Sardarpur Jhandir (Urdu: سردارپور جھنڈیر) is a town in Mailsi, Vehari District, Punjab (Pakistan). It is located at 29°46′24″N 72°01′18″E and an altitude of 130 meters.

Sardarpur Jhandir is a town situated 9.5 km in North East of Gahi Mammar. Dunyapur is located to its west. Mailsi is located to the east, well known for its cotton crops and siphon at Sutlej river. Sardarpur Jhandir is a town of Mailsi, having Masood Jhandir Research Library, the largest private library in Pakistan.

== History ==
At the time of partition, this was agricultural land. The town features the Masood Jhandir Research Library, the largest private library in Pakistan which was established by scholar Malik Ghulam Muhammad in 1890. The Jhandir family has lived here for decades; they are primarily modern agricultural farmers. A few Rajput families also migrated and settled here. Some effective person of these families are Jhandir family.

== Educational institutions ==
- Government high school for boys
- Government high school for girls
- Al-ghazali School

== Business centre ==
It is entirely agricultural and has gained business popularity in a short time. Today it is one of the business platforms for businessmen and a mostly commercial area. The main source of its popularity is the production of agricultural products. This town is situated at the junction of Kahror Pakka and Mailsi. The town is located on roads which connect two cities and are used for the transportation of goods. It also connects four main cities: Kahror Pakka, Dunyapur, Mailsi and Dokota, making it the center of these cities.

== Major finance services ==
- United Bank Limited
- MCB Bank

== Government services ==
- Masood Jhandir Research Library
- Civil Veterinary Hospital, Sardarpur Jhandir
- Basic Health Unit, Sardarpur Jhandir
