= Gahi Mammar =

Gahi Mammar گاہی ممڑ
- City District
- Nickname: Town of Poets
- Location in Pakistan
- Coordinates: 29°44′15″N 71°57′27″E
- Country: Pakistan
- Region: Punjab
- District: Lodhran District
- Established: 1940

Area
  - Total: 20 km^{2} (7.7 sq mi)
- Elevation: 130 m (430 ft)

Population (2019)
  - Total: 20,000
- Time zone: UTC+5 (PST)
- Postal code: 59150
- Area code: 0608

Gahi Mammar (Urdu: گاہی ممڑ) is a town in the Kahror Pakka located on Rao Muhammad Farooq Road in Lodhran District, at the time of partition it was agricultural land, few mahajir families migrated and settled here among which Rao and Mayo families who migrated from Mewat District and Haryana. It is located at an altitude of 130 meters. Gahi Mammar, its localities and subtowns comprise a population of around 20,000. Gahi Mammar is a town situated 18 km in North East of Kahror Pakka. Dunyapur is located to its west. There's Mailsi to its east, well known for its cotton crops and siphon at Sutlej river. Gahi Mammer is a town of Kahror Pakka, having a High School for Boys and a Middle School for Girls and also a Basic Health Unit Hospital.

== History ==
At the time of partition, this was agricultural land. Few Rajput families migrated and settled here. Some effective person of these families were Mayo and Rana Families.

The word Gahi is local language word which mean a place where people live and Mammar is a cast. After few years of partition this area came to be known as Gahi Mammar, named after Mammar people who used to live here prior to partition of subcontinent.

== Educational institutions ==
- Govt. high school for boys
- Govt. middle school for girls
- Jinnah Public School and College

== Business centers ==
Before 2000, Gahi Mammar was completely agricultural, but it has quickly gained popularity with businesses in the time since. Now, it is a mostly commercial area. The main cause of its popularity is that this it is situated at the junction of Kahror Pakka and Mailsi and the road that connects the two. It is used for transportation of goods. It also connects the four main cities: Kahror Pakka, Dunyapur, Mailsi and Dokota.

== Transport ==
=== Air ===
The nearest airport is Multan International Airport, Multan, which is 93 km away. The second nearest airport is Allama Iqbal International Airport, Lahore, 411 km away from Gahi Mammar.

=== Railway ===
The nearest main railway station is Kahror Pakka, which is on the Pakistan railway line and has connections to major cities in Pakistan by direct trains. railway lines branch out from it to Rawalpindi, Lahore via Multan, Karachi via Lodhran.

Soon, the Multan Metrobus will be extended to Kahror Pakka.

=== Roads ===
By road it is connected by one national highways: N-5 National Highway (via Gopal Road, Lodhran), expressway E5 via Dunyapur and M-4 Motorway (Pakistan) (via Khanewal interchange). all highway, expressway, motorway connect Gahi Mammar to all major cities in Pakistan.

== Agriculture ==
The most commonly adopted occupation in the town is Dairy farming and agriculture. In Kharif season, corn, jawar, kharif pulses, cotton, and guar are seeded. In Rabi season wheat, gram, mustard, taramira, and rabi pulses are sown. The canal system of Pakistan is the main source of water irrigation system as the town is surrounded by 3 major canals.
