= Lodhran (disambiguation) =

Lodhran is a city in Punjab, Pakistan.

Lodhran may also refer to:

- Lodhran District, a district of Punjab (Pakistan).
- Lodhran Tehsil, a tehsil of district Lodhran.
- Lodhran Junction railway station, a railway station in Pakistan.
