= Kahror Pacca, Pakistan =

Kahror Pacca كہروڑ پكّا Kahror Pakka
- City
- Location of Kahror Pacca Kahror Pacca (Pakistan)
- Coordinates: 29.622924°N 71.912914°E
- Country: Pakistan
- Region: (Punjab, Pakistan) Punjab
- District: Lodhran
- Tehsil: Kahror Pacca Tehsil

Government
  - Type: Municipal Committee
  - Chairman: Vacant

Population (2023)
  - City: 98,325
- Time zone: UTC+5 (PST)
  - Summer (DST): UTC+5 (PDT)
- Postal code: 59340
- Area code: 0608

Kahror Pakka is a city of the Lodhran District of Punjab, Pakistan. It is located 29 kilometers of the Jallah Jeem, Vehari District and 26 kilometres east of the district capital of Lodhran.

== Demographics ==
Population

Historical population
Year	Pop.	±% p.a.
1972	22,922	—
1981	35,600	+5.01%
1998	58,974	+3.01%
2017	82,137	+1.76%
2023	98,325	+3.04%

According to the 2023 census, Kahror Pacca city population was 98,325.

Languages

Languages of Kahror Pacca city (2023 Census)
1. Saraiki (66.6%)
2. Urdu (26.3%)
3. Punjabi (4.50%)
4. Mewati (1.10%)
5. Others (1.50%)

In the 2023 Census, Saraiki was the most widely spoken language in Kahror Pacca city, accounting for 66.6% of the population. Urdu was spoken by 26.3%, followed by Punjabi at 4.5%, Mewati at 1.1%, and other languages at 1.5%.
