= Rind Jada =

Pakistani village

Rind Jada رند جادہ
- Census town & Village
- Location in Pakistan and Punjab respectively Rind Jada (Punjab, Pakistan)
- Coordinates: 29.6976°N 71.9107°E
- Country: Pakistan
- Province: Punjab
- District: Lodhran
- Tehsil: Kahror Pacca
- Elevation: 77.273 m (253.52 ft)

Population (1998)
  - Total: 7,664
- Time zone: UTC+5:30 (PST)

Rind Jada (Urdu: رند جادہ) is a village of Tehsil Kahror Pacca in Lodhran District of Punjab, Pakistan.The name Rind (Urdu: رند) is derived from the Rind, a Baloch tribe, that constitutes the major population of Rind Jada.

== Demography ==
As of the 2025 census, the population of the village is 8540

== Languages ==
Commonly spoken languages are Urdu & Saraiki.

== Castes ==
Major castes of the area are Baloch.

== Constituency ==
Rind Jada falls under Constituency NA-155 of National Assembly of Pakistan. Abdul Rehman Khan Kanju was elected from this constituency as member of National Assembly of Pakistanin 2013 Pakistani general election. He contested elections as independent candidate, but later joined Pakistan Muslim League (N) - the ruling party after 2013 Pakistani general election. Abdul Rehman Khan Kanju is the son of former Pakistani politician & Minister of State for Foreign Affairs (Pakistan) Siddiq Khan Kanjuwho was assassinated during campaign for 2001 Elections for Local government in Pakistan .
