= Asif Saeed Manais =

Pakistani politician

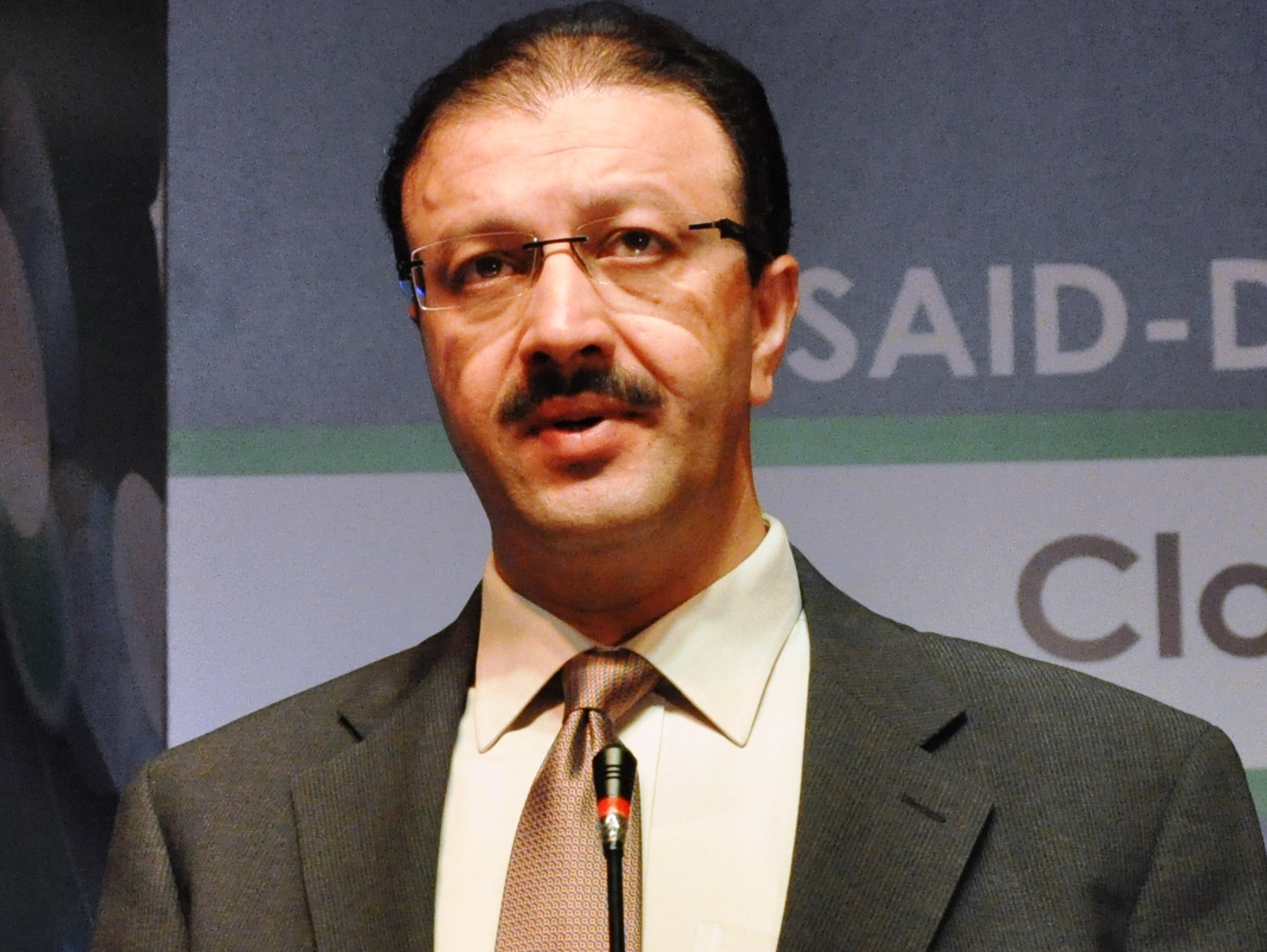
- Asif Saeed Manais

Member of the Provincial Assembly of the Punjab
- In office 2002 – 31 May 2018

Personal details
- Born: 1 December 1976 (age 49) Vehari, Punjab, Pakistan
- Party: [PML-N ] (2025-present)
- Other political affiliations: PMLN (2002-2025)
- Parent: Saeed Ahmed Khan (father)

Asif Saeed Manais is a Pakistani politician who was a Member of the Provincial Assembly of the Punjab, from 2002 to May 2018.

== Early life and education ==
He was born on 1 December 1976 in Vehari District, Punjab to former speaker of the Punjab Assembly Saeed Ahmed Manais.

He graduated in 1997 from Government College, Lahore and has a degree of Bachelor of Arts.

== Political career ==
He was elected to the Provincial Assembly of the Punjab as a candidate of Pakistan Muslim League (Jinnah) from Constituency PP-238 (Vehari-VII) in the 2002 Pakistani general election. He received 41,278 votes and defeated Inayat Hussain Khan Khakwani, a candidate of Pakistan Peoples Party (PPP).

He was re-elected to the Provincial Assembly of the Punjab as a candidate of Pakistan Muslim League (N) (PML-N) from Constituency PP-238 (Vehari-VII) in the 2008 Pakistani general election. He received 40,431 votes and defeated an independent candidate, Ghuzanfar Abbas Ghallu. He also ran for the seat of the National Assembly of Pakistan as an independent candidate from Constituency NA-169 (Vehari-III) and from Constituency NA-170 (Vehari-IV) but was unsuccessful. He received 150 votes from Constituency NA-169 (Vehari-III) and lost the seat to Tehmina Daultana, and received 766 votes and lost the seat to Mehmood Hayat Khan.

He was re-elected to the Provincial Assembly of the Punjab as a candidate of PML-N from Constituency PP-238 (Vehari-VII) in the 2013 Pakistani general election. He received 46,474 votes and defeated Muhammad Ali Raza Khan Khakwani, a candidate of Pakistan Tehreek-e-Insaf (PTI). In June 2013, he was inducted into the provincial cabinet of Chief Minister Shahbaz Sharif and was made Provincial Minister of Punjab for Special Education. In June 2013, he was inducted into the provincial Punjab cabinet of Chief Minister Shehbaz Sharif and was made Provincial Minister of Punjab for Special Education. He remained Minister for Special Education until the cabinet reshuffle in November 2016 when he was made Provincial Minister of Punjab for livestock and dairy development.
