= Jada =

Jada can refer to:

== People ==
- Jada (given name), including a list of people with the name
- Jada (biblical figure), in the first Book of Chronicles of the Old Testament
- Ja'da bint al-Ash'ath, wife of Hasan bin Ali
- Jada Stone, ring name of wrestler Savannah Foxworth

== Music ==
- Jada (group), an American pop and R&B female vocal group
- Jada (singer) (Emilie Molsted Nørgaard, born 1993)
- "Ja-Da", a 1918 song by Bob Carleton
- "Jada", a song by the Pointer Sisters on their 1973 album The Pointer Sisters (album)

== Other uses ==
- Jada, Nigeria, a town
- Jada (2019 film), an Indian sports film
- JADA (sail boat)
- Jada Toys, a manufacturer of collectible die-cast model cars
- Journal of the American Dental Association (JADA), a monthly journal
- Jada, Mongolian name for bezoar, a mass trapped in the gastrointestinal system
- Jada, a synonym of Helcita, a genus of planthoppers

== See also ==
- Jadakiss (Jayson T. Phillips, born 1975), African American rapper
- Jada-e Maiwand, a major thoroughfare in the old center of Kabul, Afghanistan
- Rind Jada, a village in Lodhran, Pakistan
- The Jada Kings, an American rock and roll
