= Chak 354 WB =

Chak No. 354/W.B
- Village
- Country: Pakistan
- Province: Punjab
- District: Lodhran
- Tehsil: Dunyapur

Population (2019)
  - Total: 8,000
- Time zone: UTC+5 (PST)

Chak No 354/W.B is a village of Tehsil Dunyapur, District Lodhran, Punjab, Pakistan. It is located 3 km away from Dunyapur Basti Malook Road, 10 km from Dunyapur, 15 km from Basti Malook and 35 km from Lodhran.

At the moment, total population of the village is approximately 8,000. The most important crops are wheat, sugarcane, cotton, and rice from the village. Majority castes/families belong to the Arain, Jutt, Toor, and Ansari clans. The literacy rate is 50%. The Govt Girls Middle School plays an important role in education. PTI and PML N are the major political affiliated parties. The majority is Sunni sect and the minor is Ah le hadise. A darbar of baba Sadique is a symbol of peace.
