= NA-159 Vehari-IV =

Constituency of the National Assembly of Pakistan

- Constituency for the National Assembly of Pakistan
- Region: Mailsi Tehsil (partly) including Mailsi city of Vehari District
- Electorate: 489,806

Current constituency
- Party: PTI
- Member: Aurangzeb Khan Khichi
- Created from: NA-170 Vehari-IV

NA-159 Vehari-IV (این اے-159، وِہاڑى-4) is a constituency for the National Assembly of Pakistan.

== Election 2002 ==
General elections were held on 10 October 2002. Azhar Ahmad Khan Yousaf Zai of PPP won by 73,014 votes.

General election 2002: NA-170 Vehari-IV
Party	Candidate	Votes	%	±%
PPP	Azhar Ahmad Khan Yousafzai	73,014	51.79	
PML(Q)	Aurangzeb Khan Khichi	59,967	42.53	
PML(N)	Sardar Noor Ahmed Khan Malezai	3,702	2.63	
Independent	Ahmed Nawaz Khan Khichi	2,380	1.69	
Others	Others (three candidates)	1,922	1.36	
Turnout		145,137	51.35	
Total valid votes		140,985	97.14	
Rejected ballots		4,152	2.86	
Majority		13,047	9.26	
Registered electors		282,646		

== Election 2008 ==
General elections were held on 18 February 2008. Mahmood Hayat Khan Tochi Khan of PPP won by 87,124 votes.

General election 2008: NA-170 Vehari-IV
Party	Candidate	Votes	%	±%
PPP	Mehmood Hayat Khan	87,124	56.31	
PML(Q)	Aurangzeb Khan Khichi	56,816	36.72	
Independent	Saeed Ahmed Khan	5,875	3.80	
Others	Others (five candidates)	4,918	3.17	
Turnout		159,373	48.56	
Total valid votes		154,733	97.09	
Rejected ballots		4,640	2.91	
Majority		30,308	19.59	
Registered electors		328,176		
PPP hold				

== Election 2013 ==
General elections were held on 11 May 2013. Saeed Ahmed Khan Manais of PML-N won by 83,895 votes and became the member of National Assembly.

General election 2013: NA-170 Vehari-IV
Party	Candidate	Votes	%	±%
PML(N)	Saeed Ahmed Khan	83,895	42.38	
PTI	Aurangzeb Khan Khichi	81,131	40.98	
PPP	Mehmood Hayat Khan	19,554	9.88	
Others	Others (ten candidates)	13,400	6.76	
Turnout		203,743	63.67	
Total valid votes		197,980	97.17	
Rejected ballots		5,763	2.83	
Majority		2,764	1.40	
Registered electors		319,983		
PML(N) gain from PPP				

== Election 2018 ==
General elections were held on 25 July 2018.

General election 2018: NA-165 Vehari-IV
Party	Candidate	Votes	%	±%
PTI	Aurangzeb Khan Khichi	99,393	46.45	
PML(N)	Saeed Ahmed Khan	65,575	30.64	
Independent	Mian Majid Nawaz	21,411	10.01	
PPP	Mehmood Hayat Khan	15,372	7.18	
TLP	Ghulam Mustafa	8,166	3.82	
Independent	Haq Dad Ali Khan	2,011	0.94	
Independent	Ahmed Nawaz Khan Khichi	1,045	0.49	
Independent	Asif Saeed Minhas	743	0.35	
Independent	Abdullah Hayat Khan	274	0.13	
Turnout		218,182	56.43	
Total valid votes		213,990	98.08	
Rejected ballots		4,192	1.92	
Majority		33,813	15.80	
Registered electors		386,581		
PTI gain from PML(N)				

== Election 2024 ==
General elections were held on 8 February 2024. Aurangzeb Khan Khichi won the election with 116,302 votes.

General election 2024: NA-159 Vehari-IV
Party	Candidate	Votes	%	±%
PTI	Aurangzeb Khan Khichi (Note: Filed nomination papers as PTI candidate but ECP allowed him to run as an Independent)	116,302	44.01	▼2.44
PML(N)	Saeed Ahmed Khan	96,637	36.57	▲5.93
PPP	Mehmood Hayat Khan	26,804	10.14	▲2.96
TLP	Muhammad Iqbal	12,660	4.79	▲0.97
Others	Others (eleven candidates)	11,843	4.48	
Turnout		269,293	54.98	▼1.45
Total valid votes		264,246	98.13	
Rejected ballots		5,047	1.87	
Majority		19,665	7.44	▼8.36
Registered electors		489,806		

== See also ==
- NA-158 Vehari-III
- NA-160 Bahawalnagar-I
