= Riaz Basra =

Pakistani militant leader (1967–2002)

- Born: 1967; Sargodha, Pakistan
- Died: 14 May 2002 (aged 34–35); Dokota, Vehari district, Pakistan
- Military career
- Allegiance: Sipah-e-Sahaba; Lashkar-e-Jhangvi

Riaz Basra (1967 – 14 May 2002) was a Pakistani militant leader, who in 1996 founded the militant organization Lashkar-e-Jhangvi alongside Malik Ishaq and Akram Lahori.

== Early life and career ==
Riaz Basra was born to Ghulam Muhammad and Jalal Bibi in Chak Chah Thandiwala, Sargodha, in 1967. He studied at madrassas in Lahore and Sargodha before joining the Sunni religious-political party Sipah-e-Sahaba Pakistan (SSP) in 1985. Basra allegedly fought in the Soviet-Afghan War on the side of the mujahideen, receiving a bullet wound in the leg.

Among his objectives was the establishment of a Sunni Islamic Emirate in Pakistan and the declaration of Shias as non-Muslims. In 1988, he unsuccessfully ran for an assembly seat from Lahore, Punjab. Contesting against future chief minister (and later prime minister) Nawaz Sharif, he received 9,000 votes; the same year he was made the central-secretary (broadcast and publications) of the SSP.

Basra was alleged to be involved in the killing of hundreds of Shias in Pakistan, including the assassination of Shia doctors, policemen, lawyers, Iranian diplomat Sadeq Ganji in 1990 and of Shia leader Syed Sikandar Shah, and a deadly attack on a gathering at a Shia cemetery in 1998, as well as an assassination attempt on Nawaz Sharif in 1999, besides being accused of several bank heists. He was arrested in 1992 and sentenced to death for killing Ganji, but escaped from prison in 1994. Basra was also alleged to be involved in several other assassinations such as the assassinations of the leader of Imamia Students Organization, Dr Muhammad Ali Naqvi in 1995, Sargodha commissioner Syed Tajammal Abbas in 1996, and Gujranwala SSP Muhammad Ashraf Marth in 1997.

In 1996, Basra broke away from Sipah-e-Sahaba to form his own anti-Shia organization Lashkar-e-Jhangvi. The organization takes its name from the deceased founder of Sipah-e-Sahaba, Haq Nawaz Jhangvi, who was killed in a bomb attack by unknown assailants believed to be sponsored by a Shia group on 23 February 1990.

On one occasion, Basra is believed to have coerced the Punjab Chief Minister into easing police pressure on his group. He had demonstrated his ability to penetrate the CM's security by having himself photographed with the CM without his knowledge. On another occasion, he had got himself photographed with Nawaz Sharif in a similar fashion, and sent the photo to Sharif's office.

== Death ==
Basra had a bounty of 5 million rupees on his head and he was eventually killed, reportedly in a shootout in May 2002, in Kot Choudhary Sher Muhammad Ghalvi, Dokota, a Shia village in Vehari district, Punjab. There were several doubts expressed about his death because the Sargodha police had already claimed to have killed him in 1999 and the Punjab police had claimed to have killed him on six occasions. Basra and three other Lashkar-e-Jhangvi members had come to stage an attack on Choudhary Fida Hussain Ghalvi, a prominent Shia leader, but were met with armed resistance by local villagers. According to one report, a special police brigade arrived to support a half-hour later, ending the fight, during which all four Lashkar-e-Jhangvi members were killed. Doubts have been expressed about this version of events because Basra was reported to be in police custody at the time of this shootout and hardly anyone believes this account to be true. However, Pakistan's then Information Minister Nisar Memon denied any foul-play.

Basra was buried in his home village of Khurhseed, near Jhawarian outside of Sargodha. His funeral was attended by 20,000 people; though police presence prevented the SSP, the Lashkar-e-Jhangvi leadership and thousands of people from participating, and Basra's body was wrapped in the Lashkar-e-Jhangvi flag.

== See also ==
- List of Deobandis
