= Tibba Talwara =

Tibba Talwara (near Hussain abad)
- ٹبہ تلواڑا (in Urdu)
- Location within Pakistan
- 29.5277°N 71.6644°E
- Type: Settlement
- Location: Lodhran District, Punjab, Pakistan

Site notes
- Area: 50 ha (120 acres)
- Condition: Ruined
- Owner: Pakistan
- Public access: Yes

Tibba Talwara (Urdu: ٹبہ تلواڑا) is an archaeological site in Lodhran District, Punjab, Pakistan, about 5 km (3.1 mi) east of Lodhran.
