= NA-158 Vehari-III =

Constituency of the National Assembly of Pakistan

- Constituency for the National Assembly of Pakistan
- Region: Mailsi Tehsil (partly) and Vehari Tehsil (partly) including Vehari city of Vehari District

Current constituency
- Party: Pakistan Muslim League (N)
- Member: Tehmina Daultana
- Created from: NA-169 Vehari-III

NA-158 Vehari-III (این اے-158، وِہاڑى-3) is a constituency for the National Assembly of Pakistan.

== Election 2002 ==
General elections were held on 10 October 2002. Khan Aftab Khan Khichi of PML-Q won by 61,536 votes.

General election 2002: NA-169 Vehari-III
Party	Candidate	Votes	%	±%
PML(Q)	Aftab Ahmad Khan Khichi	61,536	43.71	
PML(N)	Tehmina Daultana	57,613	40.92	
Independent	Rafaqat Ali Rana	18,679	13.27	
PPP	Muhammad Kashif Mushtaq Bhabha	2,585	1.84	
Independent	Jamshad Ali Chisti	381	0.26	
Turnout		143,935	53.52	
Total valid votes		140,794	97.82	
Rejected ballots		3,141	2.18	
Majority		3,923	2.79	
Registered electors		268,924		

== Election 2008 ==
General elections were held on 18 February 2008. Tehmina Daultana of PML-N won by 48,999 votes.

General election 2008: NA-169 Vehari-III
Party	Candidate	Votes	%	±%
PML(N)	Tehmina Daultana	48,999	32.53	
PML(Q)	Aftab Ahmad Khan Khichi	45,885	30.46	
Independent	Saeed Ahmed Khan	45,828	30.42	
PPP	Ghulam Sarwar Khan Khichi	9,094	6.04	
Others	Others (three candidates)	829	0.55	
Turnout		154,768	48.24	
Total valid votes		150,635	97.34	
Rejected ballots		4,133	2.66	
Majority		3,114	2.07	
Registered electors		320,861		
PML(N) gain from PML(Q)				

== Election 2013 ==
General elections were held on 11 May 2013. Tahir Iqbal Chaudhry an Independent Candidate won by 89,673 votes and became the member of National Assembly.

General election 2013: NA-169 Vehari-III
Party	Candidate	Votes	%	±%
Independent	Tahir Iqbal Chaudhry	89,673	44.92	
PML(N)	Tehmina Daultana	72,956	36.55	
PTI	Aftab Ahmad Khan Khichi	27,226	13.64	
Others	Others (nineteen candidates)	9,758	4.89	
Turnout		204,251	63.60	
Total valid votes		199,613	97.73	
Rejected ballots		4,638	2.27	
Majority		16,717	8.37	
Registered electors		321,145		
Independent gain from PML(N)				

== Election 2018 ==
General elections are scheduled to be held on 25 July 2018.

General election 2018: NA-164 Vehari-III
Party	Candidate	Votes	%	±%
PTI	Tahir Iqbal Chaudhry	82,213	35.78	
PML(N)	Tehmina Daultana	68,250	29.70	
Independent	Muhammad Naeem Akhtar Khan	32,347	14.08	
Independent	Sagheer Ahmed	25,504	11.10	
TLP	Muhammad Ashraf Khalid	11,074	4.82	
Independent	Rana Fakhar Islam	2,839	1.24	
PPP	Ghulam Sarwar Khan Khichi	1,688	0.73	
Independent	Aftab Ahmed Khan Khichi	1,688	0.74	
Independent	Malik Azmat Ullah Khan	1,201	0.52	
Independent	Abdul Waheed	1,014	0.44	
Independent	Shoukat Ali	491	0.21	
Independent	Zafar Ali	205	0.09	
Amun Tarraqi Party	Muhammad Ghafir	181	0.08	
JWP	Muhammad Farooq Irshad	156	0.07	
Turnout		235,363	57.66	
Total valid votes		229,788	97.63	
Rejected ballots		5,575	2.37	
Majority		13,963	6.08	
Registered electors		408,197		

== Election 2024 ==
General elections were held on 8 February 2024. Tehmina Daultana won the election with 111,219 votes.

General election 2024: NA-158 Vehari-III
Party	Candidate	Votes	%	±%
PML(N)	Tehmina Daultana	111,219	42.46	▲12.76
PTI	Tahir Iqbal Chaudhry (Note: Filed nomination papers as PTI candidate but ECP allowed him to run as an Independent)	103,137	39.38	▲3.60
TLP	Syed Muhammad Ismail Shah	18,756	7.16	▲2.34
Independent	Aftab Ahmad Khan Khichi	12,736	4.86	▲4.12
Others	Others (eleven candidates)	16,081	6.14	
Turnout		268,772	54.83	▼2.83
Total valid votes		261,929	97.45	
Rejected ballots		6,843	2.55	
Majority		8,082	3.09	
Registered electors		490,217		
PML(N) gain from PTI				

== See also ==
- NA-157 Vehari-II
- NA-159 Vehari-IV
