= Chak Chaudharian =

Coordinates: 29°51′50″N 71°45′36″E

Chak Chaudharian is a village in Tensile Dunyapur, District Lodhran, Punjab, Pakistan on National Highway E5 (Khanewal Road).

== Population ==
Population is about 6,000 people who are resident in about 450 houses.

== Education ==
There is high school for girls, a primary school for boys and a private school.
