= Chak 1/M Kot Qadir =

Chak 1/M Kot Qadir چک M/1 کوٹ قادر
- Village
- Location in Pakistan
- Coordinates: 29°49′1″N 72°1′22″E
- Country: Pakistan
- Region: Punjab
- District: Vehari
- Tehsil: Mailsi

Government

Area
  - Total: 3 km^{2} (1.2 sq mi)

Population
  - Total: 300
- Time zone: UTC+5 (PST)
  - Summer (DST): UTC+6 (PDT)
- Postal code: 61200
- Area code: 0673

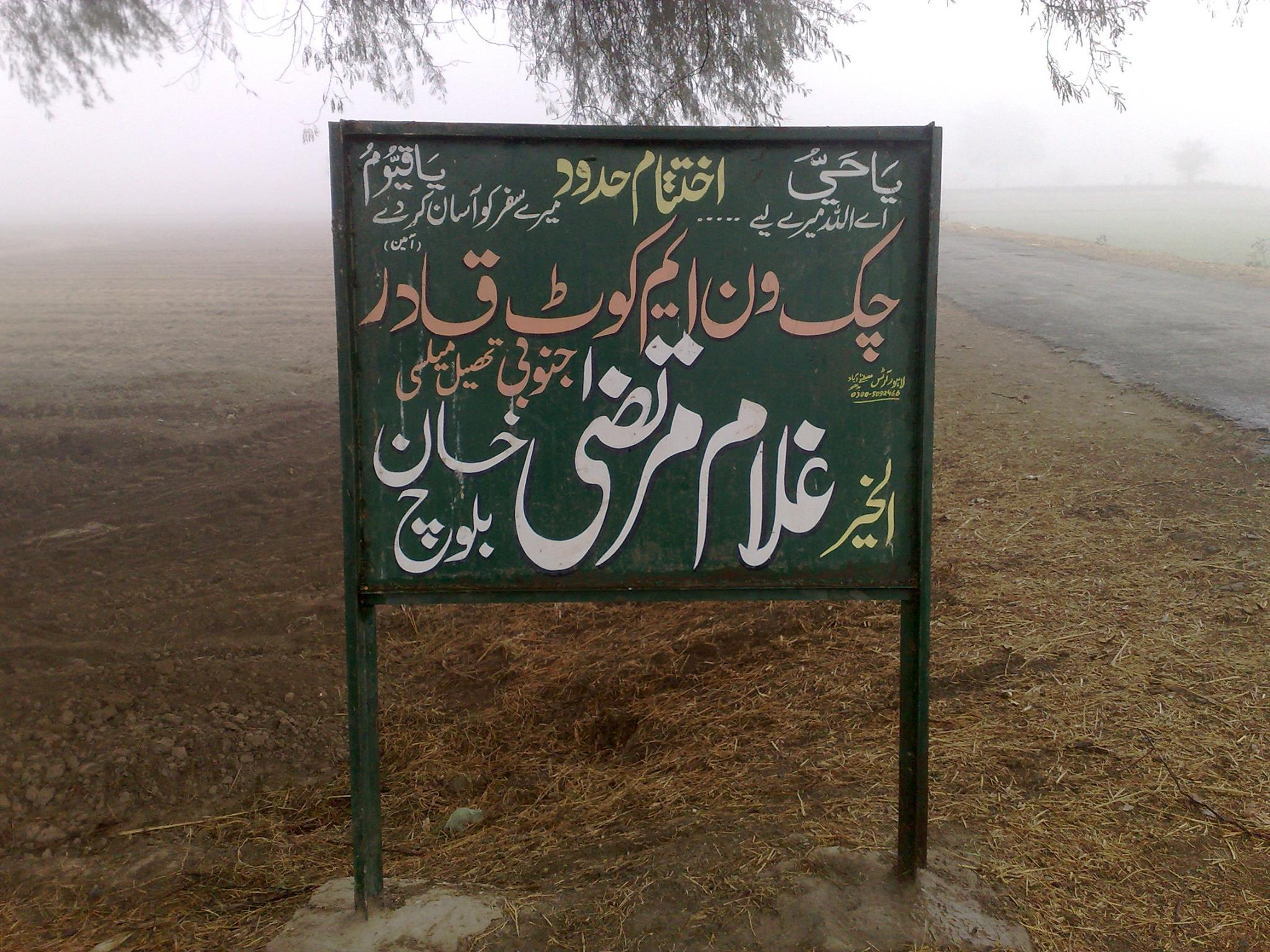
Entry Point

Chak 1/M Kot Qadir (Punjabi,Urdu: چک M/1 کوٹ قادر) is a village located in Tehsil Mailsi, Vehari District of Punjab province, Pakistan. Kot Qadir is located 18 km from Mailsi Tehsil, an administrative subdivision of the district. It is located 915 kilometres (569 mi) away from Karachi, 346 kilometres (215 mi) away from Lahore, 258 kilometres (160 mi) away from Faisalabad, 84 kilometres (52 mi) away from Multan, 42 kilometres (26 mi) away from district capital Vehari. It is located at 29°48'1N 72°10'33E at an altitude of 126 m (416 ft).

== History ==
Kot Qadir was named after Lambardar Ghulam Qadir Khan korai Baloch.

Mailsi Tehsil was created in 1849. In 1881, a series of changes were made with the object of enlarging the Shujabad Tehsil and decreasing the Mailsi charge: sixty villages in the vicinity of Kahror Pakka were transferred from the Mailsi to the Lodhran Tehsil and in 1897, forty-six villages were transferred from Lodhran to Shujabad while 104 villages east of Kahror Pakka were shifted from Mailsi in compensation. Kahror Pakka and Dunya Pur were a part of Mailsi and were annexed to Lodhran in 1924. Mailsi was declared to be a town committee in 1924 and upgraded to a sub division in 1935, but demoted to a Tehsil in 1942. It was then upgraded to a Municipaerl Committee in 1953, and declared a Tehsil municipal administration on 14 August 2001.
