= Jhokwala =

- Location within Pakistan Location within Punjab, Pakistan
- Coordinates: 29.5897°N 71.6028°E
- Country: Pakistan
- Province: Punjab
- District: Lodhran
- Time zone: UTC+5:30 (PST)

Jhokwala is a village in Lodhran District of Pakistan's Punjab Province. It is located not far from Surma, north of the district headquarters of Lodhran. The two main ethnic groups of the village are the Saraikis in the southern parts, and Muhajir Rajputs in the north. The village was originally known as Wasti Jhok Aala.
