= Jallah Arain =

Jallah Arain(Teh: Dunya Pur, Dist:Lodhran)
- Town
- Location in Pakistan
- Coordinates: 29°44′15″N 71°35′52″E
- Country: Pakistan
- Region: Punjab
- District: Lodhran District
- Tehsil Dunyapur: 1

Government
  - MNA: Mian Muhammad Shafiq Arain sahib(Federal Secretary for Communication), Now Mian Mohammad Shafiq Sahab Arain
  - MPA: Choudhary Zawar Hussain waraich sahib
- Time zone: UTC+5 (PST)
  - Summer (DST): UTC+6 (PDT)

Jallah Arain is a town of Lodhran District in the Punjab province of Pakistan. It is located 3 kilometers from the Multan-Bahawalpur main road.

== Infrastructure ==
A road starting at the bus stop Jallah Moor on the Multan-Bahawalpur road leads to Jallah Arain.

=== Education ===
There are two government schools in the town:

1. Govt. Girls Higher Secondary School, Jallah Arain
2. Govt. High School (for Boys), Jallah Arain. Govt. Boys High School is now upgraded to the Govt. Higher Secondary School (Boys) Jallah Arain.

There are also a few private schools and tuition centers as well in the area.
