= Adamwahan Bridge railway station =

Railway station in Pakistan

General information
- Coordinates: 29°28′13.5″N 71°38′38.4″E
- Owner: Ministry of Railways

Other information
- Station code: ADB

History
- Former names: Great Indian Peninsula Railway
Location

Adamwahan Bridge railway station (Urdu: آدم واہن برج ریلوے اسٹیشن) is a railway station located in Adamwahan, Lodhran District, Pakistan.

== See also ==
- List of railway stations in Pakistan
- Pakistan Railways
