= Aurangzeb Khan Khichi =

Pakistani politician

- اورنگزیب خان کھچی

National Heritage and Culture Division (Pakistan)
- Incumbent
- Assumed office 7 March 2025
- President: Asif Ali Zardari
- Prime Minister: Shehbaz Sharif
- Preceded by: Attaullah Tarar

Member of the National Assembly of Pakistan
- Incumbent
- Assumed office 29 February 2024
- Constituency: NA-159 Vehari-IV
- In office 13 August 2018 – 20 January 2023
- Constituency: NA-165 (Vehari-IV)

Personal details
- Born: Vehari, Punjab, Pakistan
- Party: IPP (2026-present)
- Other political affiliations: PMLN (2025-2026); PTI (2013-2024); PML(Q) (2002-2013)

Aurangzeb Khan Khichi (Urdu: اورنگزیب خان کھچی) is a Pakistani politician who had been a member of the National Assembly of Pakistan since February 2024 and previously served in this position from August 2018 till January 2023.

== Political career ==
He contested the 2002 Pakistani general election from NA-170 Vehari-IV as a candidate of Pakistan Muslim League (Q) (PML(Q)), but was unsuccessful. He received 59,967 votes and was defeated by Azhar Ahmad Khan Yousafzai, a candidate of Pakistan People's Party (PPP).

He contested the 2008 Pakistani general election from NA-170 Vehari-IV as a candidate of PML(Q), but was unsuccessful. He received 56,817 votes and was defeated by Mehmood Hayat Khan, a candidate of PPP.

He contested the 2013 Pakistani general election from NA-170 Vehari-IV as a candidate of Pakistan Tehreek-e-Insaf (PTI), but was unsuccessful. He received 80,971 votes and was defeated by Saeed Ahmed Khan, a candidate of Pakistan Muslim League (N) (PML(N)).

He was elected to the National Assembly of Pakistan from NA-165 (Vehari-IV) as a candidate of PTI in the 2018 Pakistani general election. He received 99,393 votes and defeated Saeed Ahmed Khan, a candidate of PML(N).

He was re-elected to the National Assembly from NA-159 Vehari-IV as an independent supported by PTI in the 2024 Pakistani general election. He received 116,302 votes and defeated Saeed Ahmed Khan, a candidate of PML(N).

== See also ==
- List of members of the 15th National Assembly of Pakistan
