= Adamwahan =

Pakistani village

Ādamwāhan
- Village
- Location in Punjab Ādamwāhan (Pakistan)
- Coordinates: 29.46803°N 71.64973°E
- Country: Pakistan
- Province: Punjab
- District: Lodhran
- Tehsil: Lodhran

Population (2017)
  - Total: 9,869
- Time zone: UTC+5 (PST)
  - Summer (DST): UTC+6 (PDT)
- Website: www.tmadunyapur.com

Adamwahan is a village in Lodhran Tehsil of Lodhran District in Punjab, Pakistan. It was the seat of a pargana in the late 16th century.

== History ==
Ādamwāhan was listed in the Ain-i-Akbari as a pargana in sarkar Multan, counted as part of the Bet Jalandhar Doab. It was assessed at 369,445 dams in revenue and supplied a force of 30 cavalry and 700 infantry.

== Demographics ==
As of the 2017 Census of Pakistan, Adamwahan had a population of 9,869 (5,060 male, 4,804 female, and 5 other). The average household size was 7.22 people. In terms of age distribution, 32.1% of Adamwahan residents were under age 10 in 2017 (3,167 in total); 18.9% were between 10 and 18 (1,870 in total); 43.8% were between 18 and 60 (4,327 in total); and 5.1% were over the age of 60 (505 in total). The village's working population was 694 (not counting children under the age of 10). In terms of religion, all 9,869 residents were Muslim.

The overall literacy rate in the village was 39.88% (49.64% among males and 29.68% among females). In terms of education, a total of 814 males and 506 females had completed primary school but had not completed matriculation exams; 251 males and 133 females had completed matriculation but not university, and 60 males and 32 females had completed university.

The village had 1,260 houses as of 2017; 942 were pakka, 114 were semi-pakka, and 204 were kachcha. 1,210 houses (96.0%) had potable water, 1,163 (92.3%) had access to electricity, 369 (29.3%) had access to gas, 365 (29.0%) had a kitchen, 866 (68.7%) had a bathroom, and 765 (60.1%) had a latrine.

== See also ==
- Adamwahan Bridge railway station
