= Tibba Sultanpur =

- Interactive map of Tibba Sultanpur
- Coordinates: 29°58′29″N 71°52′55″E

Tibba Sultanpur is a town between Multan and Vehari, Pakistan. The original name of the town was Tibba Sunta Pur, the name of a Hindu. After Partition, Muslims started to change the names of towns and cities. The name of Tibba Sunta Pur was modified to Tibba Sultan Pur.

The village was named after a Sufi saint named Sultan Pur, who is believed to have lived in the area. (No related shrine was known there).

The village has several mosques and Islamic seminaries where local residents can receive religious education.

Like many other villages in Pakistan, agriculture is the main source of livelihood for the people of Tibba Sultan Pur. The village is known for its fertile land and produces a variety of crops, including wheat, rice, sugarcane, and vegetables.

In recent years, there has been some development in the village, with the construction of new schools and roads. However, like many rural areas in Pakistan, Tibba Sultan Pur still faces challenges such as poverty, lack of basic infrastructure, and limited access to healthcare and education.

== Demographics ==
The majority of the population is Muslim.

The 2017 population numbers was 14,789, a 1.4% annual increase over the preceding 20 years.

The central town is home to Sheiks, Kamboh, Pathan, and Gujjar castes.

Surrounding villages host Maitla, Pandha, Manais, Sindher, Sahoo, and Shah. Most of them migrated from the River Ravi (Taulamha).

The residents conduct business and farming. The Dangra and Khakwaani families are the town landlords. Arain, Baloch, Sial, and Jutt are also present.

== Notables ==
- Saeed Ahmad Khan Manais (politician)
- Mumtaz Ahmad Khan Manais(agronomist)
- Asif Saeed Manais (politician)

== Geography ==
Tibba Sultanpur is 32 kilometres (20 mi) from Mailsi, 45.5 kilometres (28.3 mi) from Vehari and 43 kilometres (27 mi) from Multan. It is located on the Multan Road which connects the town to Mailsi, Vehari & Multan via Multan Road.

== Education ==
A Daanish School was given by Saeed Ahmed Khan Manais in 2019.
