= Husseyn Langah =

Husseyn Langah I

2nd Sultan of Multan
- Reign: 1469–1498
- Predecessor: Qutbu'd-Din Langah
- Successor: Mahmud Langah I
- Died: 1502
Names
- Husseyn Langah bin Rai Sahra
- Dynasty: Langah
- Father: Rai Sahra Langah

Husseyn Langah or Husayn Shah Langah I (Persian: حُسین لنگاہ اَوّل Huṣaīn Langāh Awwal) was the second Sultan of Langah Sultanate, who reigned from 1469 until 1498. He founded colleges of education in communities like Tulamba and a number of the Baloch tribes settled in the sultanate during his reign. After successfully capturing Chiniot, Kahror Pakka and Shorkot, he repulsed an attack by the Delhi Sultanate. He abdicated in favour of his son, who reigned as Mahmud Shah.

== Reign ==
Husseyn Langah was the son of Rai Sahra Langah, styled Qutbu'd-Din, the founder and ruler of the Langah Sultanate. He gained the throne on the death of his father in 1469. At the start of his reign, he undertook military campaigns in Punjab and captured Chiniot, Kahror Pakka and Shorkot. However, he was soon dealing with a succession crisis. Yousaf Qureshi, whom his father had supplanted, had found refuge with the ruler of the Delhi Sultanate and persuaded the army of the Sultanate to attack Multand to help him regain his throne. Husseyn successfully repulsed the attack, which was led by Tatar Khan and Barbak Shah. Eventually, he signed a peace treaty with Sikander Lodhi and abdicated in 1498 in favour of his son and successor, Budhan Khan, who assumed the title Sultan Mahmud Shah I. Husseyn died in 1502.

The reign of Sultan Husseyn I is considered to be the most illustrious of the Langah Sultans. He was known for his promotion of education and learning, inviting scholars like the brother Abd Allah and Aziz Allah of Tulamba, to colleges he founded. During the rule of the Langah, a large number of Baloch tribes were allowed to settle in the Derajaat Border in turn for military service.

Husseyn Langah Langah
Preceded by Kutb al-Din Shah Sahra Langah	Raja of Multan; 1469–1498	Succeeded by Mahmud Langah
