= Langah Sultanate =

Medieval kingdom in Punjab (1445–1530)

- 1445–1530
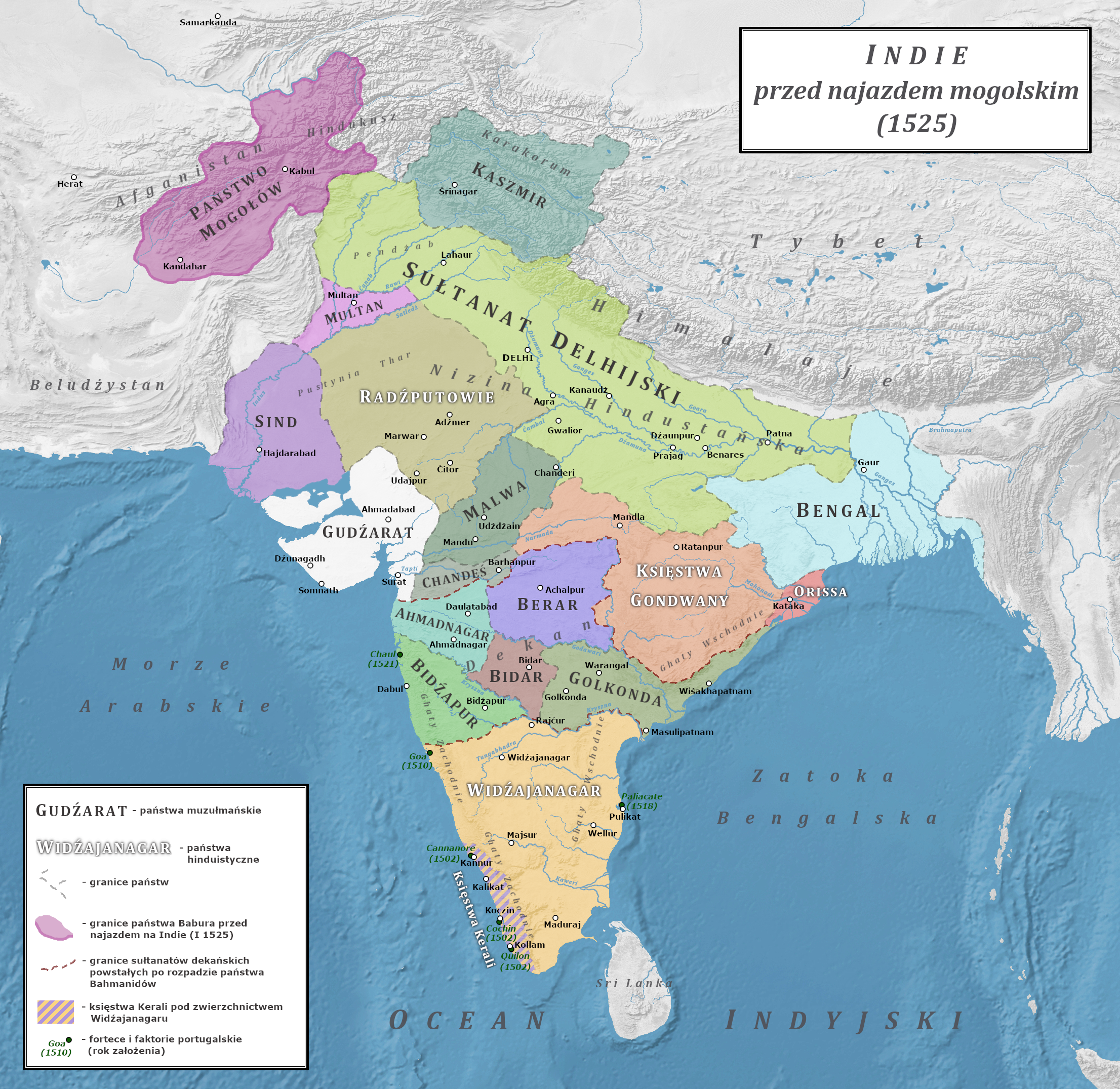
- Multan in 1525
- Capital: Multan
- Religion: Islam
- Government: Hereditary monarchy
- Sultan
  - 1445–1469: Qutbu'd-Din Mahmud I Langah
  - 1527–1530: Lashkar Khan Langah
- Historical era: Medieval India
  - Established: 1445
  - Disestablished: 1530
| Preceded by | Succeeded by |
| Delhi Sultanate | Multan Subah |
- Today part of: Pakistan

The Langah Sultanate was a late medieval sultanate based in the Punjab region in the western Indian subcontinent during the 15th and 16th centuries. It was the dominant power of the lower Doab tract with Multan as its capital. The Langah Sultanate was annexed in 1528 by the Arghun dynasty, followed shortly by the annexation of Multan by Mughal Empire in 1530.

== Origins ==
There is much uncertainty about the ethnic origins and even the chronology of Langah rulers as primary accounts differ among them widely.

According to the 16th-century writer and the author of Tārīkh-i ḥaqqī, Abd al-Haqq, the founder of the dynasty was named "Buddhan Khan Sindhi", chief of the Langah tribe of the Baloch. Another origins is given by Nurul Haq, the son of Abd al-Haqq, who writing during the reign of Jahangir in his Zabdat al-Tawarikh gives the name of the founder as Badan Khan and calls him Sindi Jat chief of Lahri. André Wink and Suhail Zaheer Lari call Langahs a Baloch tribe while according to the historians Mafizullah Kabir and Ishtiaq Hussain Qureshi Sihrah Langah was a Rajput chief who had converted to Islam on the hands of Bahauddin Zakariya or one of his successors. The 17th-century Deccan-based historian Firishta calls the Langahs as Afghans but this account has been discredited by the historian Mahmudal Hasan Siddiqi due to insufficient evidence and absence of their mention in the Afghan genealogies. He also notes that the local traditions of Multan ascribe a Rajput origins to Langahs, although contemporary Langahs are classed as Jats now. Firishta gives the name of the founder as Rai Sahra, and in addition to him Nizamuddin, Mir Ma'sum, Abbas Sarwani and Sujan Rai also call the dynasty's founder as Rai Sahra (or Sehra), however, provide no further information regarding his ethnic origins. According to the historian Hameed-ud-Din the title Rai prefixed to Sahra's name suggests a Rajput origin. Other sources have called the dynasty as Rajputs or Jats.

The place of origins for Langah sultans is similarly disputed, with Siwi (modern Sibi) and Rapar in Mailsi near Multan being usually suggested. According to Siddiqi, it seems more than probable that Langahs were initially settled near Rapar, and their association with Siwi is probably a transcription error as they have never been noticed near it.

== History ==
After the invasion of Emir Timur in 1398, the Delhi Sultanate greatly weakened and the city of Multan became independent of the Sultanate of Delhi. The inhabitants chose Shaikh Yousaf Qureshi, a descendant of the famous Sufi Bahauddin Zakariya, as ruler in 1438. He was a mild and inexperienced ruler. In 1445, Rai Sahra, chief of the Langah, attacked the city at night with the help of his tribesmen, arrested Sheikh Yousaf and proclaimed himself sultan. In this way Multan passed to the Langah clan, thus establishing the Langah Sultanate. The reign of Sultan Husayn I, who ruled from 1469 to 1498, is considered to be the most illustrious of the Langah sultans. Multan experienced prosperity during this time, and a large number of Baloch settlers arrived in the city at the invitation of Shah Husayn. Shah Husayn successfully repulsed attempted invasion by the Delhi sultans led by Tatar Khan and Barbak Shah. He fought off attempts to reinstall Shiekh Yousaf, who had taken refuge under Delhi sultans. Eventually, he signed a peace treaty with Sikandar Lodi and abdicated in the favour of his son. His successor, Budhan Khan, who assumed the title Sultan Mahmud Shah I, inherited the sultanate stretched encompassing the neighbouring regions, including the cities of Chiniot and Shorkot. During the rule of the Langah, a large number of Baloch tribes were allowed to settle in the Derajat in turn for military service.

=== Decline ===
Location of the Langah Sultanate and neighbouring South Asian polities circa 1525 CE, on the eve of the establishment of the Mughal Empire.

Sultan Husayn I being unable to hold his trans-Indus possessions, assigned the region around Dera Ismail Khan to Sardar Malik Sohrab Dodai in 1469 or 1471 and appointed him as "Jagirdar". During the reign of Mahmud Langah, his Vizier rebelled and declared himself independent ruler of Sorkot. The city was invaded during the reign of Sultan Husseyn II by ruler Shah Husayn of the Arghun dynasty, probably at Babur's insistence. Multan fell in 1528 after an extended siege and Shah Husayn appointed his son Mirza Askari as governor of the city, assisted by Langar Khan, one of the powerful Amirs of Sultan Mahmud Langah I. Shortly after Shah Husayn departed Multan for Thatta, however, the governor was thrown out of the city. The rebels under Sultan Mahmud II administered Multan for a time independently but in 1541, Sher Shah Suri captured Multan, and the sultanate ended.

=== Culture ===
The position of Multan as trans-regional mercantile centre for trade with the Islamic world remained dominant during the sultanate era. During their reign, Multan became the principle caravan route between Qandahar and Delhi. The extent of Multan's influence is also reflected in the construction of the Multani Caravanserai in Baku, Azerbaijan — which was built in the 15th century to house Multani merchants visiting the city. Legal records from the Uzbek city of Bukhara note that Multani merchants settled and owned land in the city in the late 1550s.

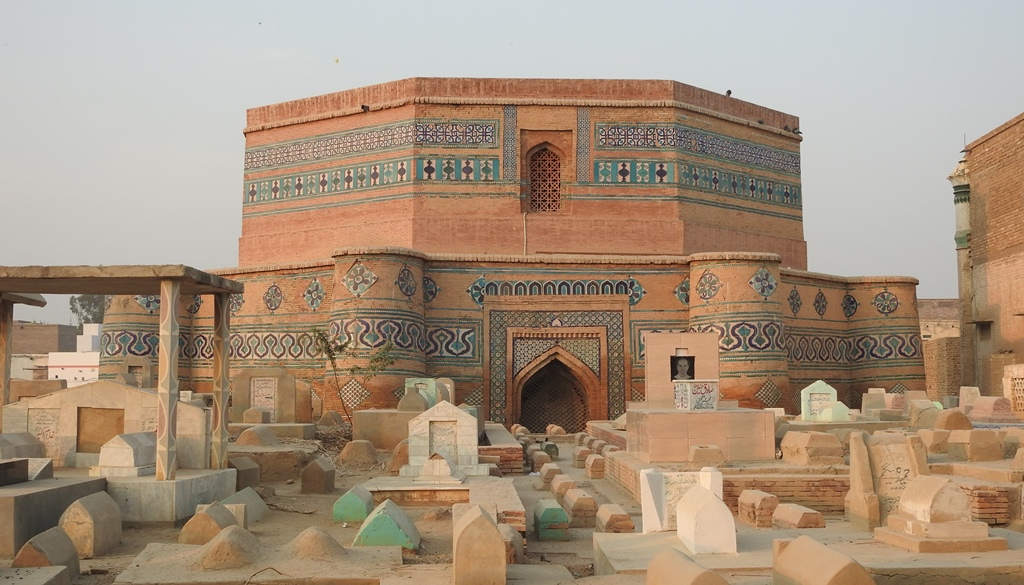
Tomb of Ghazi Khan, the Baloch governor of Derajat, appointed by Langah rulers.

Another important feature of this era was migration of Baloch tribes and their settling in South Punjab. They soon became core of the military and held political positions in regions like Derajat.

Langahs are not known to have issued any coins, and no building built by the Langahs has survived. However, several mausolea belonging to the Langah period are still extant, including those of Bibi Jawindi (built c. 1494, Uch), Tahir Khan Nahar (built late 15th century, Sitpur) and Ghazi Khan Mirani (built c. 1495, Dera Ghazi Khan), among others.

=== Ministers ===
Following is the list of known ministers of Langah Sultanate:

- Imadul Mulk (1469–1499), he was Vizier of Husseyn Langah I. He rebelled against him and was imprisoned.
- Jam Bayzid (1499–1503), he was Vizier of Mahmud Langah I. Due to his strained relations with the Sultan, he rebelled and declared himself independent ruler of Sorkot.
- Shuja Bukhari (1503–1518), He was Vizier of Mahmud Langah.
- Langar Khan (1518–1526), He was last Vizier of Sultanate. He assisted Shah Hussain Arghun to conquer Multan.

== Rulers ==
| Titular Name(s) | Personal Name | Reign |
|---|---|---|
| Sultan Qutbu'd-Din Mahmud I سلطان قطب الدین محمود اول | Rai Sahra Langah رای سهره لنگاہ | 1445 – 1469 |
| Sultan Husseyn I سلطان حسین اول | Husseyn Shah Langah حسین لنگاه | 1469 – 1498 |
| Sultan Feroz سلطان فیروز | Feroz Khan Langah فیروز خان لنگاه | 1498 – 1499 |
| Sultan Husseyn I سلطان حسین اول | Husseyn Shah Langah حسین لنگاه | 1499 – 29 August 1502 |
| Sultan Mahmud II سلطان محمود دوم | Budha Khan Langah بدھا خان لنگاہ | 30 August 1502 – 1525 |
| Sultan Husseyn II سلطان حسین دوم | Husseyn Langah حسین لنگاه | 1525 – 1527 |

== See also ==
- History of Multan
- History of Punjab
- Emirate of Multan
