= Masood Jhandir Research Library =

- کتب خانہ تحقیقی مسعُود جھنڈیر
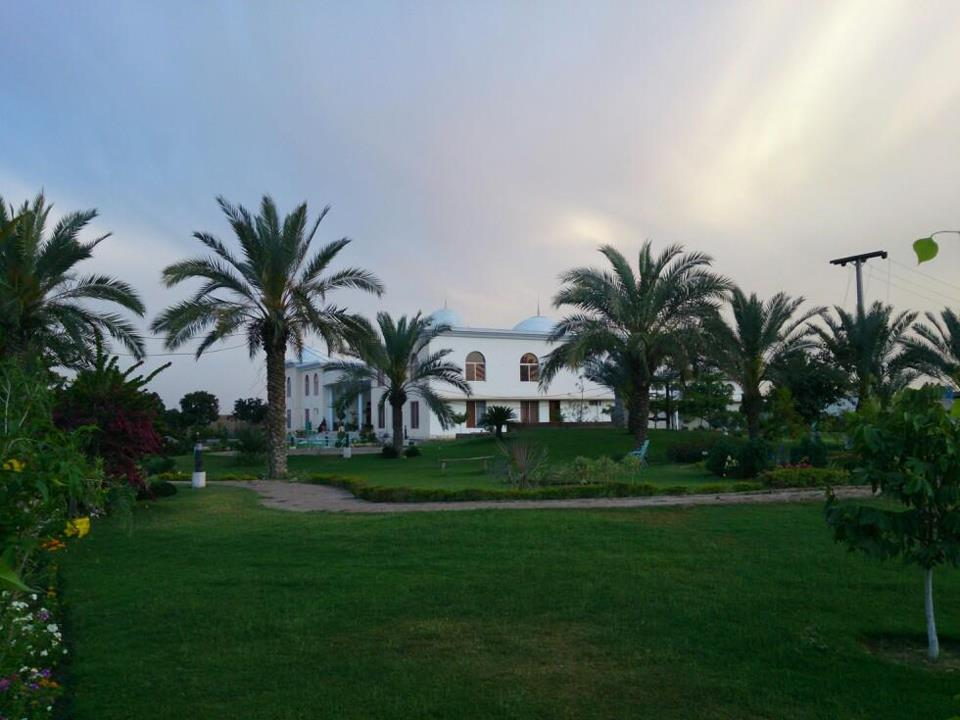
- 29°46′25″N 72°01′20″E
- Location: Pakistan
- Type: Private
- Established: 1899; 127 years ago

Other information
- Website: www.jhandirlibrary.org

The Masood Jhandir Research Library (Urdu: کتب خانہ تحقیقی مسعُود جھنڈیر) is the largest private library of Pakistan. It is located in a small village Sardar Pur Jhandir in the Mailsi Tehsil, Vehari District of Punjab province, Pakistan. It was established in 1899 by a great scholar and poet, Malik Ghulam Muhammad (1865–1936).

The new library complex was completed in 2007. It covers an area of 1,950 m². It consists of 8 commodious halls, auditorium, committee room, multimedia workstation, reception hall and office. The library is surrounded by an attractive park of 2,023 ha.

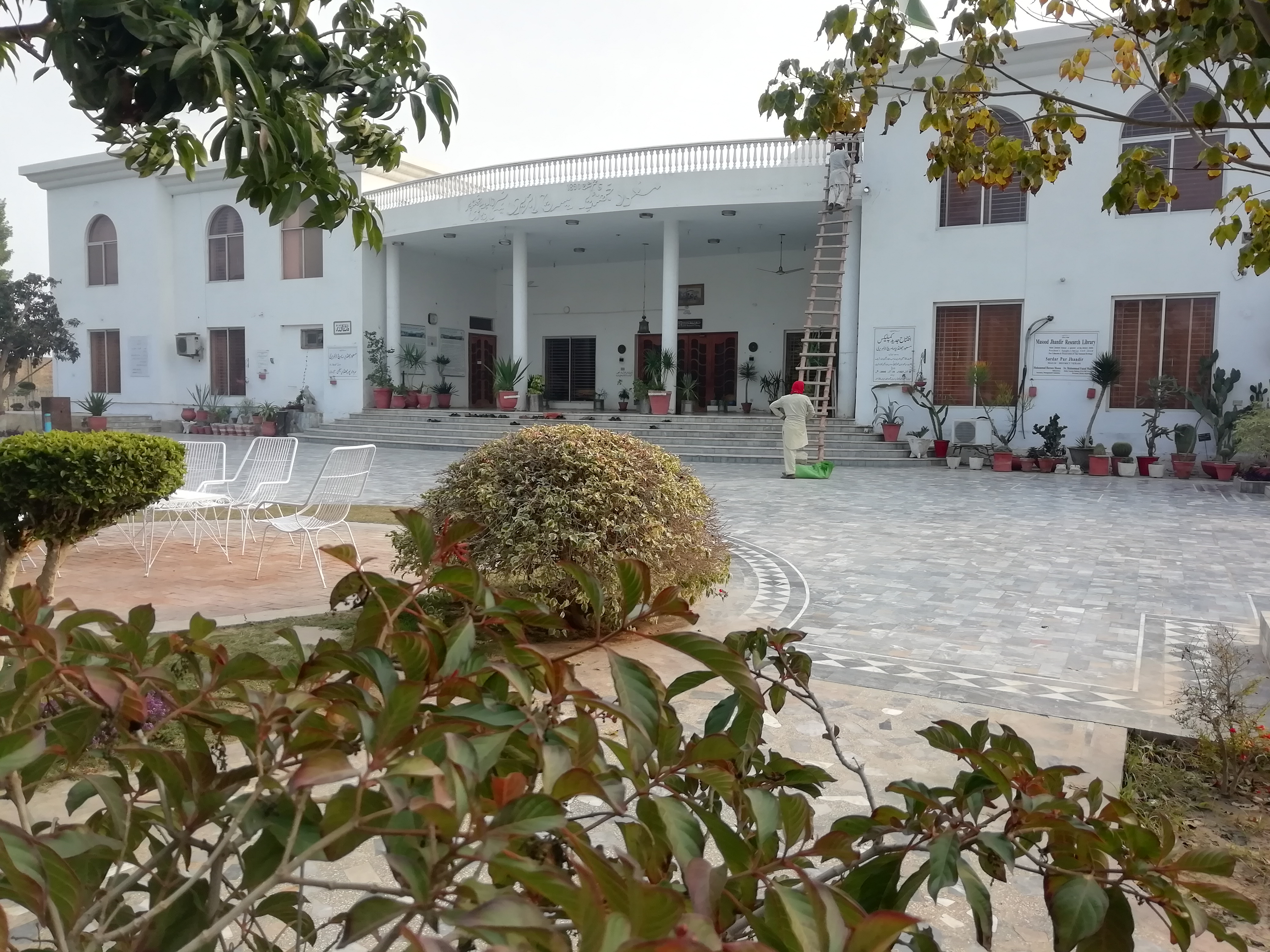
The largest private library in Pakistan

== Collection ==
MJRL has the following collection:

Table 1 Collection of the Library

Sr. Collection Details No.

1. Total No of books: 360,000

2. Periodicals

Sr. No	Collection Detail	No
1.	Total no of books	360,000
2.	Periodicals	92,000
3.	Other Manuscripts	4,000
4.	Quran Collection (Manuscripts and Rate)	1,300

Ref: Library Philosophy and Practice (LPP) available at http://unllib.unl.edu/LPP/shafique-rehman-mukhtar.htm
