= NA-154 Lodhran-I =

Constituency of the National Assembly of Pakistan

- Constituency for the National Assembly of Pakistan
- Region: Kahror Pacca Tehsil and Dunyapur Tehsil (partly) including Dunyapur city of Lodhran District
- Electorate: 558,667

Current constituency
- Party: Pakistan Muslim League (N)
- Member: Abdul Rehman Khan Kanju
- Created from: NA-155 Lodhran-II

NA-154 Lodhran-I (این اے-154، لودهراں-1) is a constituency for the National Assembly of Pakistan.

== Election 2002 ==
General elections were held on 10 October 2002. Muhammad Akhtar Khan Kanju of PML-Q won by 103,209 votes.

General election 2002: NA-155 Lodhran-II
Party	Candidate	Votes	%	±%
PML(Q)	Muhammad Akhtar Khan Kanju	103,209	59.50	
PPP	Rana Rab Nawaz Noon	61,661	35.55	
PML(N)	Rana Muhammad Ajmal Noon	5,877	3.39	
NA	Taj Muhammad Khan Langah	2,322	1.34	
Independent	Makhdoom Syed Akbar Ali Rizvi	399	0.22	
Turnout		177,000	53.86	
Total valid votes		173,468	98.01	
Rejected ballots		3,532	1.99	
Majority		41,548	23.95	
Registered electors		328,640		

== Election 2008 ==
General elections were held on 18 February 2008. Hayatullah Khan Tareen of PPP won by 50,490 votes.

General election 2008: NA-155 Lodhran-II
Party	Candidate	Votes	%	±%
PPP	Hayat Ullah Khan Tareen	50,490	29.59	
PML(N)	Muhammad Akhtar Khan Kanju	41,642	24.41	
PML(Q)	Muhammad Ajmal Khan Kanju	40,109	23.51	
Independent	Nawab Aman Ullah Khan	36,442	21.36	
Others	Others (two candidates)	1,933	1.13	
Turnout		177,575	65.28	
Total valid votes		170,616	96.08	
Rejected ballots		6,959	3.92	
Majority		8,848	5.18	
Registered electors		272,022		
PPP gain from PML(Q)				

== By-Election 2010 ==
By-Election 2010: NA-155 Lodhran-II
Party	Candidate	Votes	%	±%
Independent	Muhammad Akhtar Khan Kanju	79,967	52.12	
PPP	Hayat Ullah Khan Tareen	69,342	45.20	
Independent	Dr. Kamran Abbas Awan	3,670	2.39	
Others	Others (six candidates)	446	0.29	
Turnout		154,531	56.80	
Total valid votes		153,425	99.28	
Rejected ballots		1,106	0.72	
Majority		10,625	6.92	
Registered electors		272,048		
Independent gain from PPP				

== Election 2013 ==
General elections were held on 11 May 2013. Abdul Rehman Khan Kanju Independent won by 85,452 votes and became the member of National Assembly.

General election 2013: NA-155 Lodhran-II
Party	Candidate	Votes	%	±%
Independent	Abdul Rehman Khan Kanju	85,452	38.96	
PML(N)	Muhammad Akhtar Khan Kanju	60,524	27.59	
PTI	Nawab Aman Ullah Khan	42,398	19.33	
PPP	Rana Muhammad Faraz Noon	22,480	10.25	
Others	Others (eight candidates)	8,503	3.87	
Turnout		227,733	63.79	
Total valid votes		219,357	96.32	
Rejected ballots		8,376	3.68	
Majority		24,928	11.37	
Registered electors		356,995		
PML(N) gain from PPP				

== Election 2018 ==
General elections were held on 25 July 2018.

General election 2018: NA-160 Lodhran-I
Party	Candidate	Votes	%	±%
PML(N)	Abdul Rehman Khan Kanju	125,810	46.97	
PTI	Muhammad Akhtar Khan Kanju	115,541	43.14	
PPP	Liaqat Ali Khan	15,172	5.66	
TLP	Rana Moin Fareed Noon	10,317	3.85	
Independent	Nawab Amanullah Khan	989	0.37	
Turnout		274,822	60.26	
Total valid votes		267,829	97.46	
Rejected ballots		6,993	2.54	
Majority		10,261	3.83	
Registered electors		456,024		

== Election 2024 ==
General elections were held on 8 February 2024. Rana Muhammad Faraz Noon initially won the election and was notified as the member but after a recount, Abdul Rehman Khan Kanju was notified as the winner with 127,984 votes.

General election 2024: NA-154 Lodhran-I
Party	Candidate	Votes	%	±%
PTI	Rana Muhammad Faraz Noon (Note: Filed nomination papers as PTI candidate but ECP allowed him to run as Independent)	134,937	43.65	▲2.49
PML(N)	Abdul Rehman Khan Kanju	128,438	41.55	▼3.15
PPP	Imdad Ullah Abbasi	17,117	5.68	▼0.18
TLP	Muhammad Zubair	13,995	4.64	▼0.22
Others	Others (six candidates)	6,956	2.43	
Turnout		322,259	57.69	▲2.36
Total valid votes		301,443	93.54	
Rejected ballots		7,693	2.49	
Majority		6,499	2.10	▼0.44
Registered electors		558,667		

== See also ==
- NA-153 Multan-VI
- NA-155 Lodhran-II
