= Lodhran Tehsil =

Coordinates: 29.5333°N 71.6333°E

Lodhran Tehsil تحصیل لودھراں
- Tehsil and city
- Interactive map of Lodhran Tehsil
- Country: Pakistan
- Region: (Punjab, Pakistan) Punjab
- District: Lodhran
- City: Lodhran City

Area
  - Tehsil and city: 1,111 km^{2} (429 sq mi)

Population (2023)
  - Tehsil and city: 809,205
  - Density: 728.4/km^{2} (1,886/sq mi)
  - Urban: 144,512
  - Rural: 664,693
- Time zone: UTC+5 (PST)
  - Summer (DST): UTC+5 (PDT)

Lodhran is an administrative unit of district Lodhran under the Multan Division of Punjab province (Pakistan). Development wise, it is more developed than the other two tehsils of district Lodhran; Kehror Pakka and Dunyapur. The city became more famous nationally and internationally after the General Elections of 2013 when allegations of rigging were put by the Pakistan Tehrik-e-Insaaf in National Assembly Constituency NA-154.

== Geography ==
This tehsil is further divided into several union councils, in which, Gogran, Laal Kamal and Jalla Arain are more famous.

=== Gogran ===
This area is very famous due to the holy shrine of Syed Nasruddin Shah and his forefathers in Mehrabad. His son Syed Rafi ud Din was also the member of Punjab Provincial Assembly during the General Elections of 2008 from Provincial Constituency PP-210. During his regime, Government Degree College Gogran and a Government Hospital were constructed in this area. Similarly, double road was constructed from Lodhran (Mundhali Morr) to Gogran in his reign.

=== Jalla Arain ===
This area is famous for a domestic sweet, called "Sohan Halwa". The name of this area is designed on the caste of "Arain" but there are several other caste fellows that live in this area. Mainly, this is an agricultural area. People usually belong to agriculture industry.

== See also ==
- Adamwahan
