= Rai Sahra Langah =

- Sultan

1st Sultan of Multan
- Reign: 1445-1469
- Predecessor: Position established
- Successor: Husseyn Langah
- Died: 1469
- Dynasty: Langah
- Religion: Islam

Rai Sahra Langah (Punjabi: راۓ سہرا لنگاہ) was a chief of Langah clan and the founder of the Langah Sultanate. He assumed the title of Sultan Qutb-ud-din Mahmud Langah.

== Reign ==
After the invasion of Emir Timur in 1398, the Delhi Sultanate greatly weakened and the city of Multan became independent of the Sultanate of Delhi. The inhabitants chose Shaikh Yousaf Qureshi, a descendant of the famous Sufi Baha-ud-din Zakariya, as ruler in 1438. He was a mild and inexperienced ruler. In 1445, Rai Sahra, chief of the Langah, attacked the city at night with the help of his tribesmen, arrested Sheikh Yousaf and proclaimed himself sultan. In this way Multan passed to the Langah clan, thus establishing the Langah Sultanate.

When Rai Sahra seized the Shaikh, he had the public prayers read, and the coins struck in his own name. As the people of Multan were satisfied with his government, and rendered allegiance to him; he sent the Shaikh by the gate which was in the north, and near the tomb, which was therecipient of rays of refulgence of the Shaikh-ul-Islam Shaikh Baha’ud-din Zakariya, and gave him leave to go to Dehli; and gave orders that the gate should be blocked up with burnt bricks. They also say, that to this day, which is the that gate has been kept blocked up. He then raised the standard of sovereignty; and occupied himself with the work of government.

When Shaikh Yusuf arrived at Dehli, Sultan Bahlul received him with great courtesy and honour; and united his daughter in the bond of marriage with the son of the Shaikh. Sultan Qutb-ud-din ruled independently in the Multan till his death.The period of the rule of Sultan Qutb-ud-din was prolonged to twenty four years and he died in 1469.
