= Muhammad Akhtar Khan Kanju =

Pakistani politician

Member of the National Assembly of Pakistan
- In office August 2010 – 2013
- Constituency: NA-155 (Lodhran-II)
- In office 2002–2007
- Constituency: NA-155 (Lodhran-II)

Muhammad Akhtar Khan Kanju is a Pakistani politician who had been a member of the National Assembly of Pakistan from August 2010 to 2013. Previously he had been a member of the National Assembly from 2002 to 2007.

== Political career ==
He was elected to the National Assembly of Pakistan from Constituency NA-155 (Lodhran-II) as a candidate of Pakistan Muslim League (Q) (PML-Q) in the 2002 Pakistani general election. He received 103,209 votes and defeated Rana Rab Nawaz Noon, a candidate of Pakistan Peoples Party (PPP).

He ran for the seat of the National Assembly from Constituency NA-155 (Lodhran-II) as a candidate of Pakistan Muslim League (N) (PML-N) in the 2008 Pakistani general election but was unsuccessful. He received 41,642 votes and lost the seat to Hayat Ullah Khan Tareen, a candidate of PPP.

He was elected to the National Assembly from Constituency NA-155 (Lodhran-II) as a candidate of PML-N in by-polls held in August 2010. He received 79,744 votes and defeated Nawab Hayatullah Tareen, a candidate of PPP.

He ran for the seat of the National Assembly from Constituency NA-155 (Lodhran-II) as a candidate of PML-N in the 2013 Pakistani general election, but was unsuccessful. He received 60,524 votes and lost the seat to Abdul Rehman Khan Kanju.
