= Rana Muhammad Faraz Noon =

- رانا محمد فراز نون

Member of the National Assembly of Pakistan
- Incumbent
- Assumed office 29 April 2024
- Constituency: NA-154 Lodhran-I

Personal details
- Party: PTI (2018-present)
- Other political affiliations: PPP (2013)

Rana Muhammad Faraz Noon (Urdu: رانا محمد فراز نون) is a Pakistani politician who has been a member of the National Assembly of Pakistan since February 2024.

== Political career ==
He was elected to the National Assembly of Pakistan in the 2024 Pakistani general election from NA-154 Lodhran-I as an independent candidate supported by Pakistan Tehreek-e-Insaf (PTI). He received 134,937 votes while runner-up Abdul Rehman Khan Kanju of Pakistan Muslim League (N) (PML(N)) received 128,438 votes. However in a recount, Kanju was declared as the winner. Following this, Noon ceased to hold the office of Member of the National Assembly. However, in April 2024, the Lahore High Court ruled in favor of Noon and his victory notification was restored on 29 April 2024. He took oath as a member on the same day.
