= Tahir Iqbal Chaudhry =

Pakistani politician

- طاہر اقبال چوہدری

Member of the National Assembly of Pakistan
- In office 13 August 2018 – 20 January 2023
- Constituency: NA-169 (Vehari-III)
- In office 1 June 2013 – 31 May 2018

Personal details
- Born: 10 April 1969 (age 57) Vehari, Punjab, Pakistan
- Party: PTI (2018-present)
- Other political affiliations: IND (2013-2018); PML(Q) (2008-2013); PMLN (2002-2008)

Tahir Iqbal Chaudhry (Urdu: طاہر اقبال چوہدری; born 10 April 1969) is a Pakistani politician who had been a member of the National Assembly of Pakistan from August 2018 till January 2023 and June 2013 till May 2018. Previously he had been a member of the Provincial Assembly of Punjab from 2002 to 2013.

== Early life and education ==
He born and grew up in Vehari on 10 April 1969.

After schooling he graduated in 1996 from the University of Karachi.

== Political career ==
He served as union council nazim of Vehari.

He was elected to the Provincial Assembly of Punjab as a candidate of Pakistan Muslim League (N) (PML-N) from Constituency PP-236 (Vehari-V) in the 2002 Pakistani general election. He received 37,363 votes and defeated Nafisa Rashid, a candidate of Pakistan Muslim League (Q) (PML-Q).

He was re-elected to the Provincial Assembly of Punjab as a candidate of PML-Q from Constituency PP-236 (Vehari-V) in the 2008 Pakistani general election. He received 30,686 votes and defeated an independent candidate, Nafisa Rasheed.

He was elected to the National Assembly of Pakistan as an independent candidate from Constituency NA-169 (Vehari-III) in the 2013 Pakistani general election. He received 89,673 votes and defeated a candidate of PML-N, Tehmina Daultana. After getting elected to the National Assembly, he joined PML-N in May 2013.

In November 2017, he announced to quit PML-N following 2017 Tehreek-e-Labaik protest however refused to step down from National Assembly seat. In April 2018, he quit PML-N. In May 2018, he joined Pakistan Tehreek-e-Insaf (PTI).

He was re-elected to the National Assembly as a candidate of PTI from Constituency NA-164 (Vehari-III) in the 2018 Pakistani general election. He received 82,084 and defeated Tehmina Daultana.
