= Mian Irfan Aqeel Daultana =

Pakistani politician

Member of the Provincial Assembly of the Punjab
- In office 15 August 2018 – 14 January 2023
- Constituency: PP-231 Vehari-III
- In office 29 May 2013 – 31 May 2018

Personal details
- Born: 29 March 1976 (age 50) Vehari, Punjab, Pakistan
- Party: PMLN (2013-2025)

Mian Irfan Aqeel Daultana is a Pakistani politician who was a Member of the Provincial Assembly of the Punjab, from May 2013 to May 2018 and from August 2018 to January 2023.

== Early life and education ==
He was born on 29 March 1976 in Lahore to Tehmina Daultana.

He received his early education from Aitchison College. He graduated in science from University of the Punjab in 1996 and received the degree of Master of Business Administration in marketing and finance from CSM Institute in Lahore in 1998. In 2000, he received a diploma in architecture from University of Cambridge.

== Political career ==
He was elected to the Provincial Assembly of the Punjab as a candidate of Pakistan Muslim League (Nawaz) (PML-N) from Constituency PP-234 (Vehari-III) in the 2013 Pakistani general election.

He was re-elected to Provincial Assembly of the Punjab as a candidate of PML-N from Constituency PP-231 (Vehari-III) in the 2018 Pakistani general election.
