= The Jada Kings =

- Origin: Minneapolis, Minnesota, United States
- Genres: Rock and roll, alternative rock, glam rock, pop rock
- Years active: 2006-2009
- Labels: Drive Thru Records, Kickstart Records
- Past members: 2006-2009; Marc Holt; Mike Stahl; Ryan Tate; Jason Lee

The Jada Kings were an American rock and roll band formed in Minneapolis, Minnesota in 2006. They were most well known for their extended play Better Late Than Never, released on Drive Thru Records in September 2007. Their hard rock single "Sparkplug" and alternative ballad "She'll Be Around" charted on Sweden's Sverigetopplistan and Norway's VG-lista.

Their lineup included vocalist Marc Holt, guitarist Ryan Tate, bassist Jason Lee, and drummer Mike Stahl. In early 2007, the group won the People's Choice Poll at the annual VEISHEA festival and opened tour dates with Saliva, Eve 6 and Supagroup. They announced a hiatus in 2009 following a riot after a sold-out performance in Dinkytown, Minneapolis.

== Discography ==
- Better Late Than Never (2007) (extended play, Buddyhead Records)
- Moonshine / Dancin' (2006) (45", Kickstart Records)
