= Mehmood Hayat Khan =

Pakistani politician

Member of the National Assembly of Pakistan
- In office March 2008 – March 2013
- Constituency: NA-170 (Vehari--IV)

Personal details
- Party: PPP (2025-present)
- Other political affiliations: PPP (1993-2025)

Mehmood Hayat Khan, also known as Tochi Khan, is a Pakistani politician who had been a member of the National Assembly of Pakistan from 2008 to 2013. He had been a Member of the Provincial Assembly of the Punjab from 1993 to 1996.

== Political career ==
He was elected to the Provincial Assembly of the Punjab as a candidate for Pakistan Peoples Party (PPP) for Constituency PP-192 (Vehari-I) in the 1993 Pakistani general election. He received 27,676 votes and defeated an independent candidate, Sardar Muhammad Khan Khichi.

He ran for the seat of the Provincial Assembly of the Punjab as a candidate of PPP from Constituency PP-192 (Vehari-I) in the 1997 Pakistani general election but was unsuccessful. He received 18,463 votes and lost the seat to Mian Zahid Nawaz, a candidate of Pakistan Muslim League (N) (PML-N).

He was elected to the National Assembly of Pakistan as a candidate for PPP for Constituency NA-170 (Vehari-IV) in the 2008 Pakistani general election. He received 87,124 votes and defeated Aurangzaib Khan Khichi, a candidate of Pakistan Muslim League (Q) (PML-Q).

He ran for the seat of the National Assembly as a candidate for PPP for Constituency NA-170 (Vehari-IV) in the 2013 Pakistani general election but was unsuccessful. He received 19,554 votes and lost the seat to Saeed Ahmed Khan.
