= Abdul Rehman Khan Kanju =

Pakistani politician

- عبدالرحمان خان کانجو

Member of the National Assembly of Pakistan
- In office 13 August 2018 – 10 August 2023
- Constituency: NA-160 (Lodhran-I)
- In office 1 June 2013 – 31 May 2018
- Constituency: NA-155 (Lodhran-II)

Minister of State for Overseas Pakistanis and Human Resource Development
- In office 4 August 2017 – 31 May 2018
- President: Mamnoon Hussain
- Prime Minister: Shahid Khaqan Abbasi

Personal details
- Born: 18 July 1976 (age 50) Lodhran, Punjab, Pakistan
- Party: PMLN

Abdul Rehman Khan Kanju (Urdu: عبدالرحمان خان کانجو; born 18 July 1976) is a Pakistani politician who had been a member of the National Assembly of Pakistan from August 2018 till August 2023. Previously, he was a member of the National Assembly from June 2013 to May 2018.

He served as Minister of State for Overseas Pakistanis and Human Resource Development, in Abbasi cabinet from August 2017 to May 2018.

== Early life ==
He was born on 18 July 1976.

== Political career ==
He was elected to the National Assembly of Pakistan as an independent candidate from Constituency NA-155 (Lodhran-II) in the 2013 Pakistani general election. He received 85,452 votes and defeated Muhammad Akhtar Khan Kanju. He joined Pakistan Muslim League (N) (PML-N) in May 2013.

Following the election of Shahid Khaqan Abbasi as Prime Minister of Pakistan in August 2017, he was inducted into the federal cabinet of Abbasi. He was appointed as the Minister of State for Overseas Pakistanis and Human Resource Development. Upon the dissolution of the National Assembly on the expiration of its term on 31 May 2018, Kanju ceased to hold the office as Minister of State for Overseas Pakistanis and Human Resource Development.

He was re-elected to the National Assembly as a candidate of PML-N from Constituency NA-160 (Lodhran-I) in the 2018 Pakistani general election.

Following the 2024 Pakistani general election, the Lahore High Court set aside the notification of Kanju’s win from NA-154 Lodhran-I and declared the petitioner, PTI-backed Rana Muhammad Faraz Noon, as the winner. Supreme Court of Pakistan overturned the decision of Lahore High Court and reinstated notification declaring Abdul Rehman Khan Kanju as winner.
