= Saeed Ahmed Khan =

Pakistani politician

- سعید احمد خان

Member of the National Assembly of Pakistan
- In office 1 June 2013 – 31 May 2018
- Constituency: NA-170 (Vehari-IV)

Personal details
- Born: August 14, 1951 (age 75) Tibba Sultanpur
- Party: Pakistan Muslim League (N)
- Children: 2

Saeed Ahmed Khan Manais (Urdu: سعید احمد خان منیس; born 14 August 1951) is a Pakistani politician who was a member of the National Assembly of Pakistan, from June 2013 to May 2018 and was a member of the Provincial Assembly of the Punjab between 1985 and 2002.

== Early life and education ==
He was born on 14 August 1951.

Saeed Ahmad Khan Manais went to Sadiq Public School Bahawalpur

He graduated from Forman Christian College Lahore

== Political career ==
He was elected to the Provincial Assembly of the Punjab from Constituency PP-178 (Vehari) in the 1985 Pakistani general election. During his tenure as Member of the Punjab Assembly, he served as Provincial Minister of Punjab for Communication and Works, Food and Transport in the provincial Punjab cabinet of Chief Minister Nawaz Sharif.

He was re-elected to the Provincial Assembly of the Punjab as a candidate of Islami Jamhoori Ittehad (IJI) from Constituency PP-193 (Vehari-II) in the 1988 Pakistani general election. He received 26,919 votes and defeated Hayatullah Khan, a candidate of Pakistan Peoples Party (PPP). During his tenure as member of the Punjab Assembly, he served as Provincial Minister of Punjab for Agriculture in the provincial Punjab cabinet of Chief Minister Nawaz Sharif.

He was re-elected to the Provincial Assembly of the Punjab as a candidate of IJI from Constituency PP-193 (Vehari-II) in the 1990 Pakistani general election. He received 41,361 votes and defeated Muhammad Aslam Khan, a candidate of Pakistan Democratic Alliance (PDA). He served as the Speaker of the Provincial Assembly of Punjab during this period.

He ran for the seat of the Provincial Assembly of the Punjab as a candidate of Pakistan Muslim League (Jinnah) (PML-J) from Constituency PP-193 (Vehari-II) in the 1993 Pakistani general election but was unsuccessful. He received 24,552 votes and lost the seat to Muhammad Aslam Khan, an independent candidate.

He was re-elected to the Provincial Assembly of the Punjab as a candidate of PML-J from Constituency PP-193 (Vehari-II) in the 1997 Pakistani general election. He received 27,735 votes and defeated Irshad Ahmad Ghallvi, a candidate of Pakistan Muslim League (N) (PML-N). He served as Leader of the Opposition in the Provincial Assembly of the Punjab from June 1997 to October 1999.

Manais ran for the seat of the National Assembly of Pakistan as an independent candidate from Constituency NA-169 (Vehari-III) in the 2008 Pakistani general election but was unsuccessful. He received 45,828 from Constituency NA-169 (Vehari-III) and lost the seat to Tehmina Daultana who got 48,999 votes.

He was elected to the National Assembly as a candidate of PML-N from Constituency NA-170 (Vehari-IV) in the 2013 Pakistani general election. He received 83,895 votes and defeated Aurangzeb Khan Khichi, a candidate of Pakistan Tehreek-e-Insaf (PTI).

He contested the 2018 Pakistani general election from NA-165 Vehari-IV as a candidate of PML-N, but was unsuccessful. He received 65,575 votes and was defeated by Aurangzeb Khan Khichi, a candidate of PTI.
