= JADA (sail boat) =

Sailing yacht

JADA is a sailing yacht that was originally commissioned by Delbert Axelson of Axelson Manufacturing. Axelson had the yacht built for his son, Jack Axelson, as a college graduation present. JADA is less a name and more of an acronym, being the first letters of the names Jack, Alta (Jack's mother), and Delbert Axelson. Delbert, a member of Newport Harbor Yacht Club had JADA built at Stephens Brothers Boat Yard in Stockton, CA in 1938. JADA was launched on June 5 of that year. Before becoming and currently serving as a charter boat, JADA was actively raced and sailed up and down the west coast from Santa Barbara to Ensenada, Mexico, and to Hawaii and back.

During the famous 1939 hurricane that caused so much damage at Newport Harbor, JADA suffered minor damage.

JADA was sold in 1950 to Mrs. Isabelle Belyea. Her daughter’s boyfriend raced it in the 1951 TransPac race from California to Hawaii and placed 10th in class B and 18th in the overall fleet. From a schooner configuration, JADA was re-rigged into a yawl to be more competitive in ocean racing in 1955 under the ownership of George R. Sturgis. Under George, JADA twice placed 2nd overall in 5 TransPacs. JADA took 1st overall in the Tahiti Race in 1969. JADA went through several owners in the '60s and '70s, and was rumored to have been purchased and enjoyed by actor, Marlon Brando, for many years in French Polynesia. JADA began her commercial career serving as a charter boat in Honolulu, Hawaii in 1992. She was relocated to San Diego in 1996 and currently resides at the Sheraton Harbor Island Marina.

Frequent celebrity visitors on JADA were Humphrey Bogart, Lauren Bacall, Errol Flynn, John Wayne and Broadway star John Raitt (father of singer Bonnie Raitt). More recently in San Diego, guests include Tom Cruise, Nicole Kidman and Louis CK.

== Designer ==
Specs:
| Vessel Service: | Passenger (INSPECTED) | |
| Trade Indicator: | Coastwise Unrestricted | |
| Hull Material: | Wood: Yellow Cedar planks over Live Oak frames | |
| Year Built: | 1938 | |
| Ship Builder: | Stephens Brothers Boat Yacht | |
| Hailing Port: | San Diego, CA | |
| Call Sign: | WDE7518 | |
| Class and Type: | Wooden Yawl | |
| Net Tonage: | 19 | |
| Gross Tonnage: | 21 | |
| Length (ft): | 47.2 waterline | 65 on deck |
| Hull Depth/Draft (ft): | 8.2 | |
| Beam (ft): | 11.1 | |
| Propulsion: | Sail | |

I. Judson Kelly designed JADA. The JADA was commissioned by Delbert Axelson of Axelson Manufacturing. The Stephens Brothers built the JADA in 1938. Her length overall was 56 feet, with a draft of 8 feet. Initially a staysail schooner, JADA was later re-rigged as a yawl.

JADA was built concurrently with the Odyssey, a sister boat with an almost identical hull, by the Stephens Brothers Shipyard of Stockton. Their cast iron keels were both poured and machined by the Axelson Manufacturing Co. of Huntington Park. Both were owned by a Huntington Park industrialist.

== Captain ==
According to George Sturgis, “Bill was comfortable captaining both sail and powerboats. He won the Los Angeles to Tahiti race in 1956 on his sailboat, Jada, and proceeded to spend six months diving and filming the remote islands in the South Pacific.”

Residing in San Diego, JADA can be seen at the annual Festival of Sail and Tall Ship Festival.
