= Mailsi =

Mailsi مَیلسی
- City
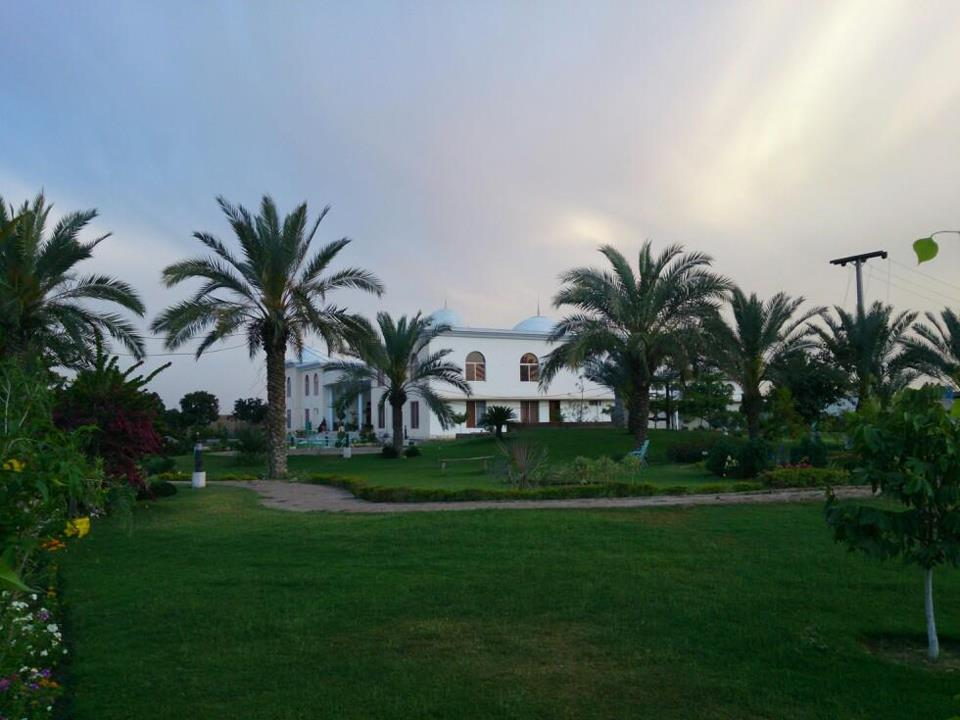
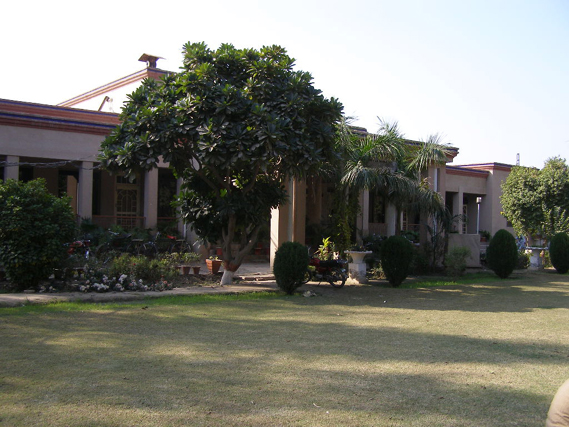
- From top: Masood Jhandir Research Library, TMA Mailsi office

- Location in Pakistan Mailsi (Pakistan)
- Coordinates: 29°48′1″N 72°10′33″E
- Country: Pakistan
- Region: Punjab
- District: Vehari
- Tehsil: Mailsi
- Union councils: 23UCs (Mailsi)-8UCs (Jallah Jeem)

Government
  - Type: Municipal Committee
  - Chief Officer: Ishrat Ullah Khan
  - Municipal Officer: Vacant

Area
  - City: 5 km^{2} (1.9 sq mi)

Population (2023)
  - City: 125,431
  - Rank: 96th in Pakistan (2023)
  - Density: 25,000/km^{2} (65,000/sq mi)
- Time zone: UTC+5 (PST)
  - Summer (DST): UTC+6 (PDT)
- Postal code: 61200
- Area code: 0673
- Website: www.mailsi.com.pk

Mailsi (میلسی) is a city in southern Punjab, Pakistan. It is the headquarters of Jallah Jeem-Mailsi Tehsil, an administrative subdivision of Vehari District.Sutlej-Jeemi river flows in the East.

== Description ==
It is one of the largest tehsil of Vehari District; the cities of Lodhran and Vehari were created from Mailsi in the nineteenth and twentieth centuries. Vehari, now a district, was sub-tehsil of Mailsi. Mailsi is well known because of its cotton crops. Mailsi is known for the Jhandhir Library and Siphon at the Sutlej river. The Mailsi Siphon was constructed by the Gamon construction company in 1964 to control the water flow between the Sutlej river and the Sindhnai Link canal.

=== Malsian Tradition ===
Malsian is notorious as the headquarters of Mohammadan Sunars who were engaged in the manufacture of coins and coins of ancient mintage for many of the principal cities of India. Malsian is also said to have excelled in making wooden stamps for printing cotton. It also made buttons from shells from the river, and dyeing of wool is another of the trades carried out.

== Demographics ==
Population

Historical population

Year	Pop.	±% p.a.
1951	10,242	—
1961	13,617	+2.89%
1972	21,318	+4.16%
1981	33,652	+5.20%

Year	Pop.	±% p.a.
1998	55,434	+2.98%
2017	82,322	+2.10%
2023	125,431	+7.27%

According to 2023 census, Mailsi had a population of 125,431.

Languages

Languages of Mailsi MC (2023 Census)
1. Saraiki (52.1%)
2. Urdu (37.3%)
3. Punjabi (10.2%)
4. Others (0.40%)

== Geography and climate ==
Mailsi is located in the Indus Valley near the city of Multan in central Pakistan. The area around the city is a flat, alluvial plain ideal for agriculture. The canals which cut across the tehsil provide irrigation. The Indus Water Treaty sold the water in the Sutlej river to India; the reduced water flow in the river had had a pronounced effect on the flora and fauna of the area. The Mailsi Siphon was built to control the water flow in the Sidhnai Link Canal and Sutlej river under this same Indus Water Treaty.

Mailsi features an arid climate with hot summers and mild winters. The city witnesses some of the most extreme weather in the country. The highest recorded temperature is 53.8 °C (129 °F), and the lowest recorded temperature is −1 °C (30.2 °F). The average rainfall is 127 millimeters (5.0 in). Dust storms are a common occurrence within the city.

It is located 13 kilometres (8.1 mi) away from Jallah Jeem,915 kilometres (569 mi) away from Karachi, 346 kilometres (215 mi) away from Lahore, 258 kilometres (160 mi) away from Faisalabad, 84 kilometres (52 mi) away from Multan, 78 kilometres (48 mi) away from Bahawalpur, 42 kilometres (26 mi) away from Vehari, 34 kilometres (21 mi) away from Kahror Pakka, 62 kilometres (39 mi) away from Lodhran, 51 kilometres (32 mi) away from Dunyapur and 37.92 kilometres (23.56 mi) away from Hasilpur. It is located at 29°48'1N 72°10'33E at an altitude of 126 m (416 ft). Mailsi Canal is also named after this city.

== Agriculture ==
Farming is the primary economic activity in Mailsi and exports include cotton, wheat, sugarcane, rice, and henna. Since independence, the amount of cultivated land has increased. Irrigation systems have been affected by the shortage of water in Sutlej River. There are three canals, Mailsi Link, Faddah and Dhamakki, There are many sub-canals and a number of streams for irrigation is also there.

Mailsi-Jallah Jeem lies in the temperate zone of Pakistan. The climate is arid, characterized by hot summers and cool winters, and wide variations between extremes of temperature at given locations.

Mailsi-Jallah Jeem has four seasons: a cool, dry winter from December through February; a hot, dry spring from March through May; the southwest monsoon period, from June through September; and the retreating monsoon period of October and November. The onset and duration of these seasons vary somewhat according to location.

== Government ==
Mailsi is a Tehsil Headquarters of the city of Mailsi-Jallah Jeem and one of the Tehsil/administrative areas of the Vehari district. The city of Mailsi is also the headquarters of Mailsi Tehsil, and the city of Mailsi is administratively subdivided into 31 Union Councils. The city of Mailsi is also has a Combined Military Hospital.Pakistan Army Medical Corps

== Education ==
The first Government Primary School was established in 1864 during British Raj after failed freedom war of 1858. In 1920, a primary school was given the status of middle school. Later, in 1942, it became a high school. The first girls’ high school was established in 1890, which later became a middle high school in 1972.

in 1949, Islamic Educational Institute Jamia Taleem Ul QUran, Multan Road Mailsi was established by Mufti Muhammad Kaleemullah, Where 1000+ students learned Islamic studies.

In 1976, Inter College for boys was established and in 1980, a girls' college was established. In 1986, Commercial Training Institute was established. In 1995, both colleges were converted into degree granting institutions. In 1980, the Federal Government established F.G public school, as the first English medium school for the citizens of Mailsi. Now there are several private English medium schools. There are two Government Degree Colleges, one for boys and another for girls, five higher secondary schools and 596 government schools, including 32 high schools.

Education was primarily a government affair before the late 1970s. On 2 January 1972, the Government of Prime Minister Zulfiqar Ali Bhutto nationalized educational institutions throughout Pakistan. Even though there is no evidence of the existence of a private school before that 1972, the nationalization of educational efforts across Pakistan curb development of any private sector educational institutions. In 1977, the Marshal Law Government of Zia-ul-Haq allowed for limited privatization and opening of private educational institutions. Among the first few new private educational institutions in Pakistan, was Mailsi Model School on Multan Road. Due to its focus on Girls' education, Mailsi Model School became a very successful institution and a school of choice for the girls from affluent families in Mailsi. The school opened its doors in 1977. Since the early 2000s, a number of private schools have been established in the city.

Allied School, Hawks Public School, City Public School, Al-Rehan School System, Dawn Public School and APS&AC are local institutes. IPS College, Punjab College, Superior College and Vista College are local colleges.

== Transportation ==
Mailsi, میلسی, is located on the northern alternate rail and overland route to Bahawalpur and Lahore, the capital of the Punjab province of Pakistan. The western route connects with Multan and in south-east side Bahawalpur & south-west is Kahror Pakka.

Bus, rail and air service connects Mailsi to other parts of Pakistan.

== Telecommunication ==
Land line based companies and mobile phone companies serve Mailsi. in south there is Khair Pur Tamewali and in south east there is Hasilpur city. Moreover, every mobile network companies also operate in the city with 3G-4G Band facility.

== Monuments and recreational places ==
In the city, a historic mosque named as "Shahi Masjid" is located in the second largest city( Jallah Jeem -8UCs ) in the Tehsil. It is said that it was built by Mughal Emperor Shahjahan (1058AD). A zoo is also situated in the city named as "Garrison Park". A public park named as TMO Park is also there to provide citizens space for recreational activities. Ladies Park is built for the recreation of the female members of the society. Mailsi Siphon, situated near the city on the river Sutlej, is a picnic-spot. Sardar Pur Jandhir Library also attracts a number of students and researchers across the country to it. There is one canal in Mailsi city near Kent area. A badshahi mosque located in Moza Malik Wahin. Its foundation was placed by empire Orangzaib Alamgier. It was started in 1653 and completed in 1706.
