= Dokota =

Pakistani town

Coordinates: 29°54′N 72°02′E

Dokota دوکوٹہ
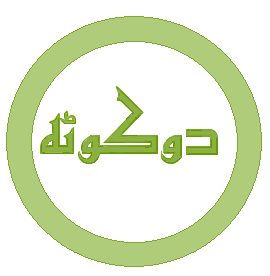
- Dokota
- Interactive map of Dokota
- Tehsil: Mailsi
- District: Vehari
- Province: Punjab
- Country: Pakistan

Dokota is a small town located in Mailsi Tehsil in the Vehari District of Punjab, Pakistan.

== History ==
After the 1947 Partition of India, a Punjabi community was established in Dokota after migrating from East Punjab of India.

== Geography ==
The town is situated on the Mailsi-Multan Road. It is 70 km (44 miles) Southeast of Multan and 19 km (11 miles) West of Mailsi. The majority of its population works in the agricultural sector.

Construction of a road from Dokota to Malik Tayyab Awan Hospital was started in 2010–2011, as part of the Southern Punjab Development Project.

== Demographics ==
Inhabitants of Dokota mostly belong to the Punjabi and Saraiki-speaking communities, and the Rajput caste. Dokota is an all-religion friendly community where one can practice according to his beliefs.

== Economy ==
The crop production of Dokota includes corn, cotton, wheat, and rice, as well as many colourful (colorful) fruits and vegetables. There is a canal in the village populated by bakeries, farms, and schools. Also, many banks are present. Including a culture of traditional Desi foods made and designed by locals, there are many fast food restaurants.

== Culture ==
Dokota has many schools and colleges.
