= Tehmina Daultana =

Pakistani politician

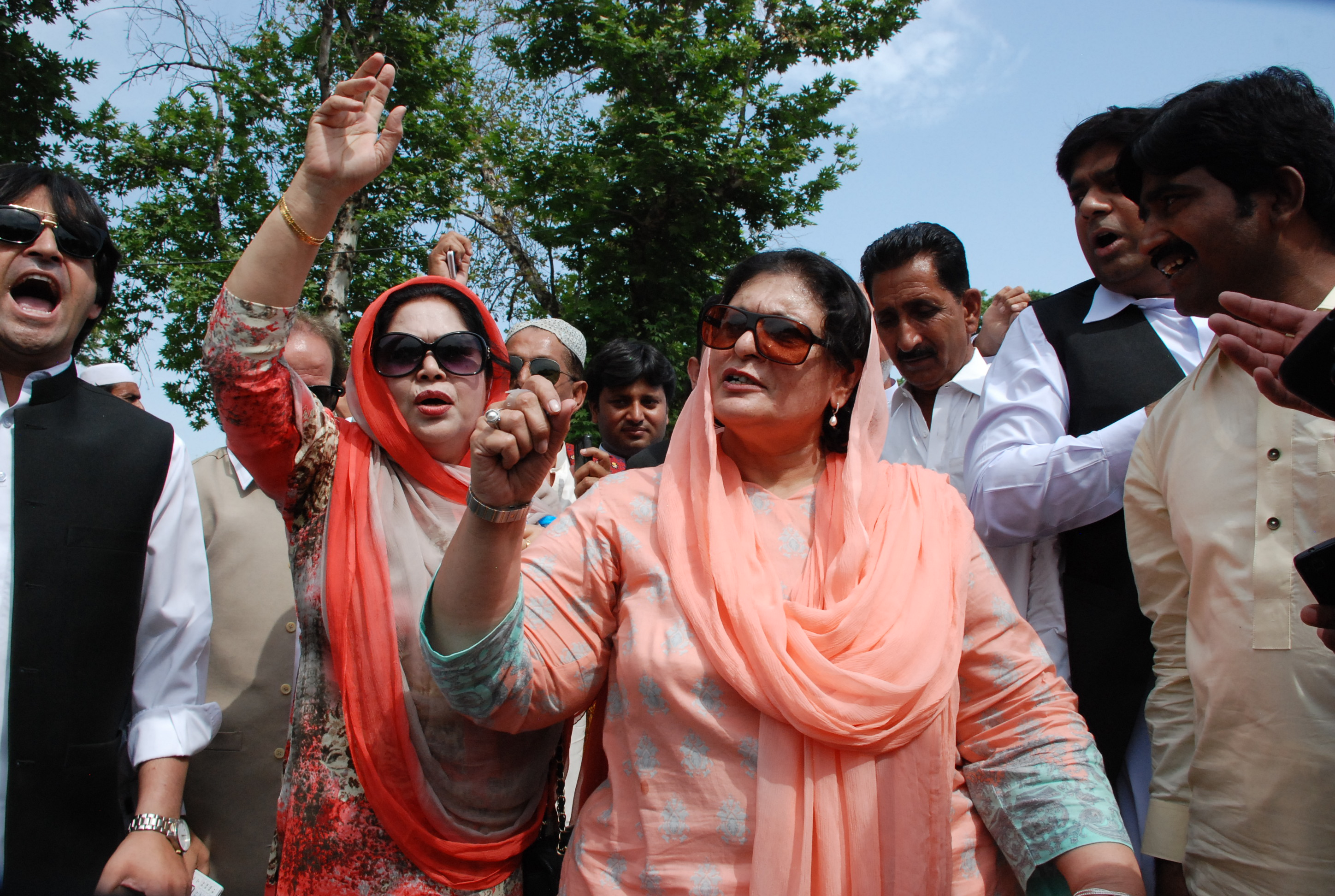

Member of the National Assembly of Pakistan
- Incumbent
- Assumed office 29 February 2024
- Constituency: NA-158 Vehari-III
- In office 1 June 2013 – 31 May 2018
- Constituency: Reserved Seat For Women
- In office 17 March 2008 – 16 March 2013
- Constituency: NA-169 (Vehari-III)
- In office 16 November 2002 – 15 November 2007
- Constituency: Reserved Seat For Women
- In office 15 February 1997 – 12 October 1999
- Constituency: NA-130 (Vehari-II)
- In office 15 October 1993 – 5 November 1996
- Constituency: NA-130 (Vehari-II)

Personal details
- Party: PMLN (1993-present)
- Children: 2 sons: Mian Imran Aqueel Daultana and Mian Irfan Aqeel Daultana
- Relatives: See Daultana family

Tehmina Daultana (Punjabi, Urdu: تہمینہ دولتانہ) is a Pakistani politician who has been a member of the National Assembly of Pakistan since February 2024, and previously served in position five times between 1993 and 2018.

== Political career ==
Daultana was elected to the National Assembly of Pakistan for the first time in the 1993 Pakistani general election from NA-130 Vehari-II as a candidate of PML (N).

She was re-elected to the National Assembly in the 1997 Pakistani general election from NA-130 Vehari-II on the PML (N) ticket and was made Minister for Women Development, Social Welfare and Special Education.

She ran for the seat of the National Assembly as a candidate of PML (N) from Constituency NA-168 and Constituency NA-169 in the 2002 Pakistani general election, but was unsuccessful. Later, she was indirectly re-elected to the National Assembly as a candidate of PML (N) on reserved seat for women from Punjab.

She was elected as a member of the National Assembly as a candidate of PML (N) from NA-169 (Vehari-III) in the 2008 Pakistani general election. She lost from NA-168. She was inducted into the federal cabinet and was appointed as Minister for women development, Minister for culture and Minister for Science and Technology.

She ran for the seat of the National Assembly as a candidate of PML(N) from NA-169 in the 2013 Pakistani general election, but was unsuccessful. She was later indirectly elected to the National Assembly as a candidate of PML (N) on reserved seats for women from Punjab.

She ran for the seat of the National Assembly as a candidate of PML(N) from NA-164 Vehari-III in the 2018 Pakistani general election, but was unsuccessful. She received 68,250 votes and was defeated by Tahir Iqbal Chaudhry, a candidate of Pakistan Tehreek-e-Insaf (PTI).

She was re-elected to the National Assembly as a candidate of PML(N) from NA-158 Vehari-III in the 2024 Pakistani general election. She received 111,219 votes and defeated Tahir Iqbal Chaudhry, an Independent politician candidate supported by PTI.
