= Mailsi Tehsil =

Mailsi Tehsil تحصِيل مَيلسى
- Tehsil
- Location of Mailsi Tehsil in Punjab, Pakistan
- Country: Pakistan
- Region: (Punjab, Pakistan) Punjab
- District: Vehari
- Capital: Mailsi
- Capital: Jallah Jeem
- Towns: 2
- Union councils: 23-Mailsi / 8-Jallah Jeem

Population (2017)
  - Tehsil: 713,895-Mailsi / 240,000-Jallah Jeem
  - Urban: 128,442-Mailsi/ 57,382-Jallah Jeem
  - Rural: 825,453
- Time zone: UTC+5 (PST)
  - Summer (DST): UTC+5 (PDT)
- Website: [www.mailsi.com.pk]

Mailsi (Urdu: تحصِيل مَيلسى), is a subdivision tehsil, of Vehari District, in the Punjab province of Pakistan. It is divided into two blocks (Mailsi and Jallah Jeem) which are further divided into 31 Union Councils. Two of these form the tehsil capital Mailsi.

== Administration ==
The tehsil of Mailsi is administratively subdivided into 23&8 Union Councils, these are:

=== Mailsi block ===
- Garha Mor (100/WB)
- 110/WB
- 124/WB
- 151/WB
- 335/WB
- 86/WB
- 88/WB
- Chak 1/M Kot Qadir
- Alampur
- Ali Wah
- Burana Khas
- Jahanpur
- Karampur
- Ellahbad
- sikndrabad
- basti gojeien
- Kharala
- Lal Sagu
- Lalipur
- Mailsi-I (east)
- Mailsi-II (west)
- Mailsi-III (khan pur)
- Mitru qamar
- Muhammad Shah
- Sandal
- Sargana
- Sahar
- ahmed pur
- Shitabgarh
- Tibba Sultan Pur
- Zaheerabad Shaheed

Durhatta

=== Jallah Jeem block ===
- Jallah Jeem-I (east)
- Jallah Jeem-II (west)
- Warsi Wahin Jallah Jeem
- Bulandpur
- Kikri Khurd Jallah Jeem
- Fatehpur
- Arain Wahin
- Gawan - Chattani
- Niyaz pur
