= Jallah Jeem =

City in Punjab, Pakistan

Jallah Jeem جلّہ جِيم
- Town
- Location in Pakistan Jallah Jeem (Pakistan)
- Coordinates: 29°32′N 71°38′E
- Country: Pakistan
- Region: Punjab
- District: Vehari District

Government
  - Type: Municipal committee
  - Chairman: Jahangir Khan

Area
  - Urban: 10 km^{2} (3.9 sq mi)
- Elevation: 116 m (381 ft)

Population (2023)
  - Town: 28,096
- Time zone: UTC+5 (PST)
  - Summer (DST): UTC+6 (PDT)
- PK: 61230 (Post Office)
- Area code: 067 (Landlines)
- Website: www.mailsi.com.pk

Jallah Jeem (Urdu: جلّہ جِيم) is a city in the Vehari District of Punjab, Pakistan.

== Location ==
It is located 10 kilometres (6.2 mi) in the north-west of Mailsi, and is 17 kilometres (11 mi) from Mailsi-Syphon Bridge on Sutlej river. The exact location is N+29° 43' 7", E+72° 8' 4".

== Demographics ==
Population

Historical population
Year	Pop.	±% p.a.
1998	12,310	—
2017	17,323	+1.81%
2023	28,096	+8.39%

According to the 2023 census, the town of Jallah Jeem recorded a total population of 28,096, experiencing an average annual growth rate of 8.4% from 17,323 residents in 2017.

Languages

Source: 2023 Census of Pakistan
1. Saraiki (74.1%)
2. Urdu (18.5%)
3. Punjabi (6.60%)
4. Others (0.80%)

According to the 2023 census, Saraiki is the primary language spoken in Jallah Jeem, native to 74.1% of the population. Urdu is spoken by 18.5% of residents, followed by Punjabi at 6.6%, while all other languages combined account for less than 0.8%. Religions

Religions in Jallah jeem (2017 Census)
Religion	Percent
Islam	99.3%
Christianity	0.7%
Others	0.0%

== Location ==
It is located 10 kilometres (6.2 mi) in the north-west of Mailsi, and is 17 kilometres (11 mi) from Mailsi-Syphon Bridge on Sutlej river. The exact location is N+29° 43' 7", E+72° 8' 4".

== Geography and climate ==
Jallah Jeem is located near the city of Multan. The area around the city is a flat, alluvial plain. The canals which cut across the town provide irrigation. The Indus Water Treaty sold the water in the Sutlej river to India. The reduced water flow in the river had a pronounced effect on the flora and fauna of the area. The Jallah and Mailsi Siphon was built to control the water flow in the Sidhnai Link Canal and Sutlej river under the treaty. Jallah Jeem has an arid climate with hot summers and mild winters. It has some of the most extreme weather in the country. The highest recorded temperature is 54 °C (129 °F), and the lowest recorded temperature is −1 °C (30.2 °F). The average rainfall is 127 millimeters (5.0 in). Dust storms are a common occurrence within the city.

It is located at 29°48'1N 72°10'33E at an altitude of 126 m (416 ft).

Climate data for Jallah Jallah jeem1981–2010, extremes 1952–2012
Month	Jan	Feb	Mar	Apr	May	Jun	Jul	Aug	Sep	Oct	Nov	Dec	Year
Record high °C (°F)	31.7 (89.1)	36.7 (98.1)	42.8 (109.0)	44.9 (112.8)	49.0 (120.2)	47.2 (117.0)	46.7 (116.1)	41.7 (107.1)	41.7 (107.1)	40.0 (104.0)	36.4 (97.5)	32.0 (89.6)	49.0 (120.2)
Mean maximum °C (°F)	27.2 (81.0)	31.4 (88.5)	37.1 (98.8)	41.9 (107.4)	44.3 (111.7)	43.7 (110.7)	39.4 (102.9)	36.1 (97.0)	37.5 (99.5)	36.9 (98.4)	33.1 (91.6)	28.3 (82.9)	44.8 (112.6)
Mean daily maximum °C (°F)	22.6 (72.7)	25.7 (78.3)	31.6 (88.9)	37.4 (99.3)	40.7 (105.3)	39.6 (103.3)	34.6 (94.3)	32.7 (90.9)	34.2 (93.6)	33.8 (92.8)	29.3 (84.7)	24.5 (76.1)	32.2 (90.0)
Mean daily minimum °C (°F)	8.6 (47.5)	11.4 (52.5)	16.8 (62.2)	22.2 (72.0)	26.5 (79.7)	27.7 (81.9)	26.1 (79.0)	24.8 (76.6)	23.6 (74.5)	19.6 (67.3)	14.0 (57.2)	9.5 (49.1)	19.2 (66.6)
Mean minimum °C (°F)	3.8 (38.8)	6.1 (43.0)	11.3 (52.3)	16.7 (62.1)	20.9 (69.6)	22.2 (72.0)	23.1 (73.6)	22.3 (72.1)	20.8 (69.4)	15.2 (59.4)	9.1 (48.4)	4.8 (40.6)	3.8 (38.8)

== Education ==
Educational Level	Grade	Age
Primary (elementary school)	1 to 5	6 to 10
Junior Secondary (middle school)	6 to 8	11 to 13
Secondary (high school)	9 to 10	14 to 15
Higher Secondary (college/university)	11 to 12	16 to 17
