= Kahror Pacca Tehsil =

Coordinates: 29.62369°N 71.912436°E

Kahror Pacca Tehsil كہروڑ پكّا Kahror Pakka
- Tehsil
- Interactive map of Kahror Pacca Tehsil
- Country: Pakistan
- Region: (Punjab, Pakistan) Punjab
- District: Lodhran
- Union councils: 23

Government
  - Type: Local Government
  - Abdul Rehman Kanju: Ashraf salahy

Population (2023)
  - Tehsil: 547,761
  - Urban: 128,653
  - Rural: 419,108
- Time zone: UTC+5 (PST)
  - Summer (DST): UTC+5 (PDT)
- Postal code: 59340
- Area code: 0608

Jallah Kahror Pakka is a tehsil of the Lodhran District of Punjab, Pakistan. It is head quarter is Kahror Pacca located 29 kilometers of the Jallah Jeem, Vehari District and 26 kilometres east of the district capital of Lodhran.

== History ==
The Kehror is one of the nine principal fortiefied Bhati Rajput towns at the limits of Thar Desert, according to historical records.

== Demography ==
As of the 2023 census, the population of the tehsil is 547,761 .

== Weather ==
The climate is very hot and dry in summer and cool in winter. The hottest months are May to September. The maximum and minimum temperatures are 46 and 28 degrees Celsius respectively. The coldest months are December to February. During this period, the temperature fluctuates between 21 and 5 degrees Celsius. The average annual rainfall is 71 millimeters.

== See also ==
- Kahror Pacca
