= Vehari District =

District in Punjab, Pakistan

Vehari District ضلع وہاڑی
- District of Punjab
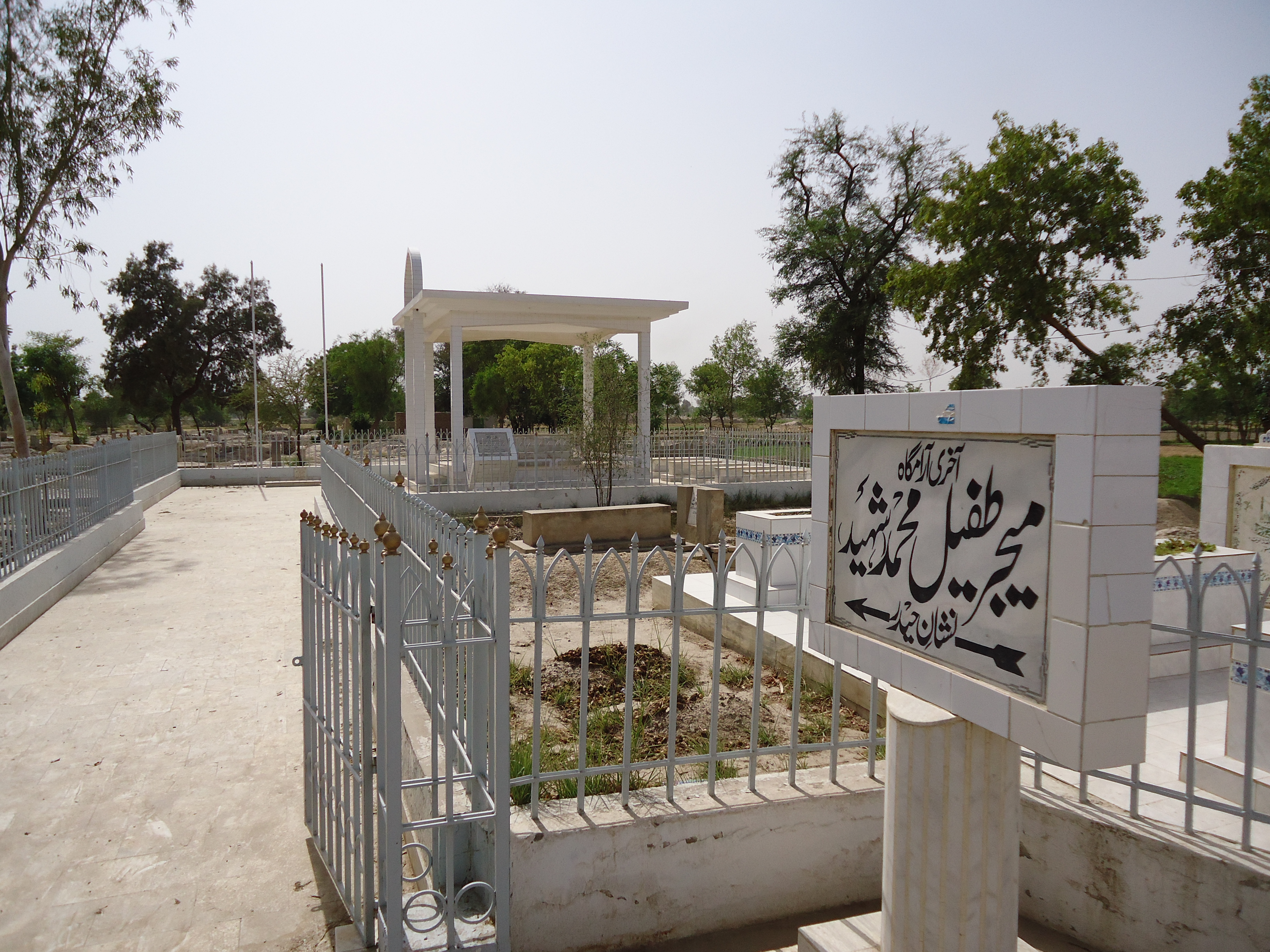
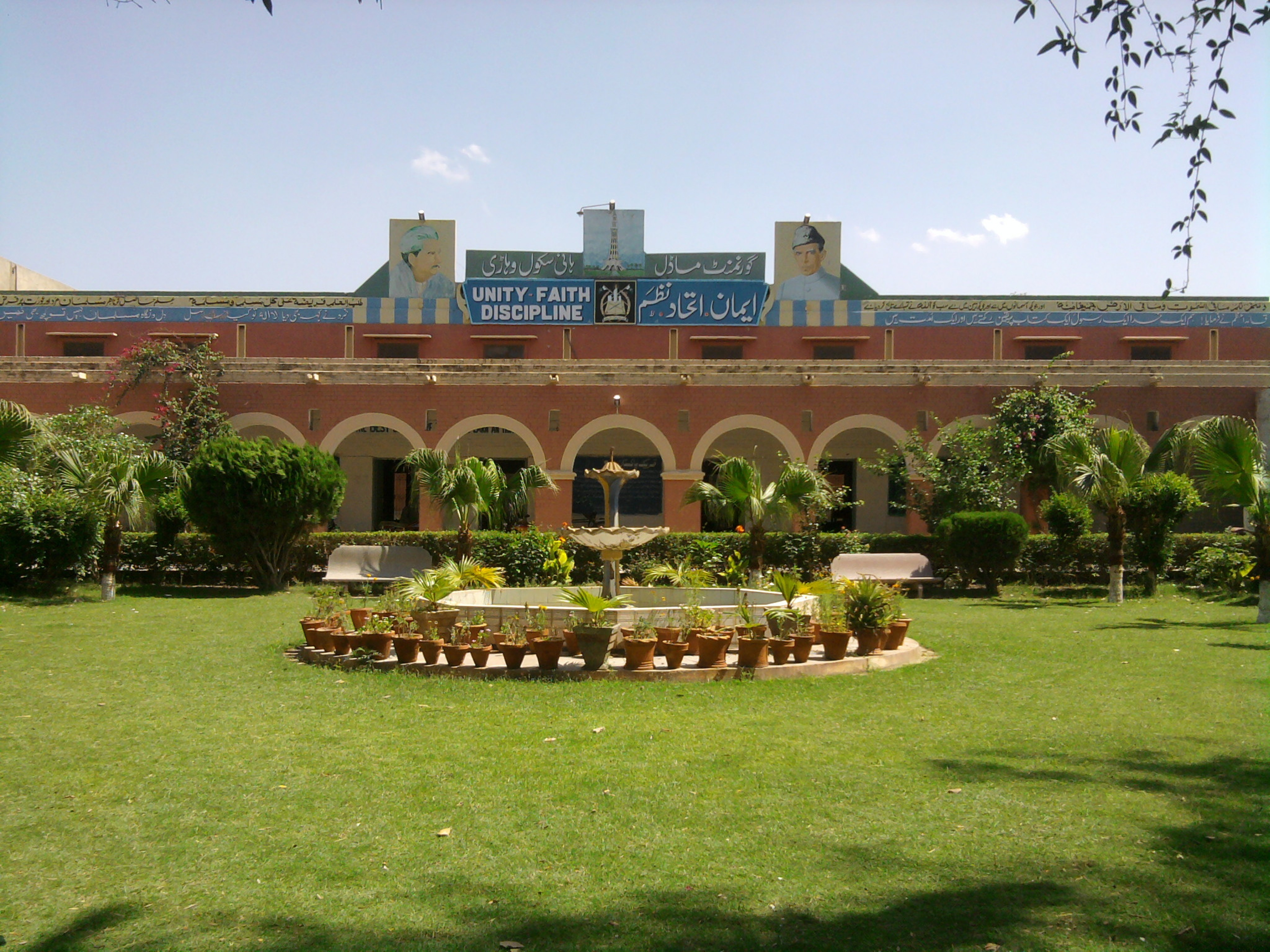
- Top: Tomb of Tufail Mohammad; Bottom: Government Model High School, Vehari

- Map of Punjab with Vehari District highlighted
- Country: Pakistan
- Province: Punjab
- Division: Multan
- Headquarters: Vehari, Jallah Jeem, Mailsi

Government
  - Type: District Administration
  - District Police Officer: Muhammad Afzal
  - District Health Officer: N/A

Area
  - District of Punjab: 4,364 km^{2} (1,685 sq mi)

Population (2023)
  - District of Punjab: 3,430,421
  - Density: 786.1/km^{2} (2,036/sq mi)
  - Urban: 782,915
  - Rural: 2,647,506

Literacy
  - Literacy rate: Total: (59.10%); Male: (66.43%); Female: (51.57%)
- Time zone: UTC+5 (PST)
- Area code: 067
- Website: vehari.punjab.gov.pk

Vehari District (Punjabi: ضلع وہاڑی) is a district in the Punjab province of Pakistan. The city of Vehari is the capital of district while Burewala is the largest city and Jallah Jeem is the third largest city of the district.

== Administrative divisions ==
The district of Vehari is administratively subdivided into following tehsils:

Tehsil	Area (km^{2})	Pop. (2023)	Density (ppl/km^{2}) (2023)	Literacy rate (2023)	Union Councils
Burewala	1,295	1,204,255	929.93	63.98%	...
Mailsi	1,639	1,120,407	683.59	54.63%	...
Vehari	1,430	1,105,759	773.26	58.21%	...
Jallah jeem	...	...	...	...	...

== History ==
The district was created on 1 July 1976 out of the four tehsils of Multan District (Vehari, Burewala, Jallah Jeem and Mailsi). The name Vehari means low-lying settlement by a flood water channel. The district lies along the right bank of the river Sutlej, which forms its southern boundary.

== Demographics ==
Historical population
Year	Pop.	±% p.a.
1951	558,536	—
1961	703,197	+2.33%
1972	1,027,319	+3.51%
1981	1,328,808	+2.90%
1998	2,090,416	+2.70%
2017	2,902,081	+1.74%
2023	3,430,421	+2.83%

As of the 2023 census, Vehari district has 543,036 households and a population of 3,430,421. The district has a sex ratio of 102.33 males to 100 females and a literacy rate of 59.10%: 66.43% for males and 51.57% for females. 940,756 (27.44% of the surveyed population) are under 10 years of age. 782,915 (22.82%) live in urban areas.

Religion in Vehari district (2023)
Religion	Percent
Islam	99.12%
Christianity	0.85%
Other	0.03%

Religion in contemporary Vehari District
Religious group	1941		2017		2023	
Religious group	Pop.	%	Pop.	%	Pop.	%
Islam	213,413	75.92%	2,882,036	99.31%	3,397,920	99.12%
Hinduism (Note: 1941 census: Including Ad-Dharmis)	43,866	15.6%	179	0.01%	226	0.01%
Sikhism	21,131	7.52%	—N/a	—N/a	66	0%
Christianity	2,679	0.95%	18,928	0.65%	29,043	0.85%
Ahmadi	—N/a	—N/a	924	0.03%	673	0.02%
Others (Note: Including Jainism, Buddhism, Zoroastrianism, Judaism, or not stated)	20	0.01%	14	0%	263	0.01%
Total Population	281,109	100%	2,902,081	100%	3,428,191	100%
Note: 1941 census data is for Malsi tehsil of Multan District, which roughly corresponds to contemporary Vehari district. District and tehsil borders have changed since 1941.

Languages of Vehari district (2023)
1. Punjabi (74.1%)
2. Saraiki (19.1%)
3. Urdu (5.83%)
4. Others (0.95%)

At the time of the 2023 census, 74.10% of the population spoke Punjabi, 19.12% Saraiki and 5.83% Urdu as their first language.

== Geography ==
The district is located between 29°36′N 71°44′E and 30°22′N 72°53′E and borders with Bahawalnagar and Bahawalpur on the southern side, with Pakpattan on the eastern, with Khanewal and Lodhran on western and with Sahiwal and Khanewal on northern side.

The total area of the district is 4,364 square kilometres (1,685 mi^{2}). It is about 93 kilometres (58 mi) in length and approximately 47 kilometres (29 mi) in breadth and it is sloping gently from northeast to southwest.

== Agriculture ==
141,000 acres of area was growing maize in 2015–16, increasing to 309,000 acres in 2019–20. The total production of maize stood at 428,000 tonnes in 2015–16, and rose to 1.1 million tonnes in 2019–20.

== Notable people ==
- Doctor Mazhar Hussain Mazhar, Urdu Poet (Jallah Jeem)
- Mohammad Irfan, cricketer
- Chaudhry Nazir Ahmed Jatt, politician, member National Assembly of Pakistan from Vehari District
- Tufail Mohammad of Punjab Regiment, recipient of Nishan-e-Haider
- Saleem Sherwani, hockey player
- Waqar Younis, cricketer

== See also ==
- Tehsils of Punjab, Pakistan
- Districts of Pakistan
  - Districts of Punjab, Pakistan
  - Districts of Sindh
  - Districts of Khyber Pakhtunkhwa
  - Districts of Balochistan, Pakistan
  - Districts of Azad Kashmir
  - Districts of Gilgit-Baltistan
- Divisions of Pakistan
  - Divisions of Punjab, Pakistan
