= Lodhran District =

District in Punjab, Pakistan

Coordinates: 29°32′24″N 71°37′48″E

Lodhran District ضِلع لودھراں
- District of Punjab
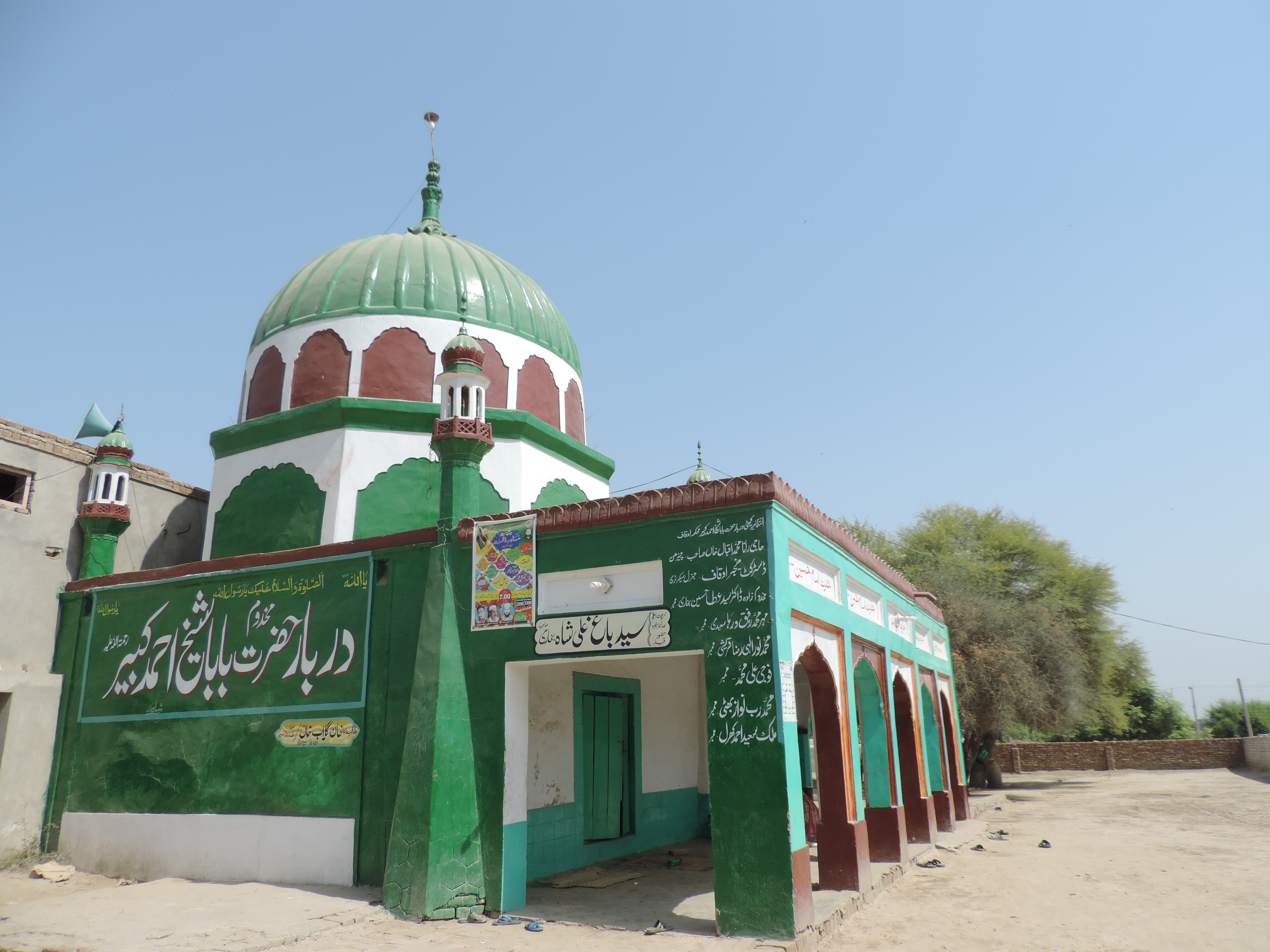
- Shrine of Sheikh Ahma Kabir

- Map of Punjab with Lodhran District highlighted
- Country: Pakistan
- Province: Punjab
- Division: Multan
- Headquarters: Lodhran

Government
  - Type: District Administration
  - Deputy Commissioner: Abdul Rauf Mahar
  - District Police Officer: Hassam Bin Iqbal
  - Chief executive officer health: Faisal Waheed

Area
  - District of Punjab: 2,778 km^{2} (1,073 sq mi)

Population (2023)
  - District of Punjab: 1,928,299
  - Density: 694.1/km^{2} (1,798/sq mi)
  - Urban: 325,053
  - Rural: 1,603,246

Literacy
  - Literacy rate: Total: (51.68%); Male: (60.63%); Female: (42.12%)
- Time zone: UTC+5 (PST)
- Area code: 0608
- Number of Tehsils: 3
- Website: lodhran.punjab.gov.pk

Lodhran District (Saraiki: ضِلع لودهراں), is a district in the province of Punjab, Pakistan, with the city of Lodhran as its capital. Located on the northern side of the River Sutlej, it is bounded to the north by the districts of Multan, Khanewal and Vehari, to the south by Bahawalpur, to the east lie the districts of Vehari and Bahawalpur; while district Multan lies on the western side.

Lodhran was split off as a separate district from Multan in 1991. It has the lowest Human Development Index of all districts in Punjab, and is among the thirty poorest districts in Pakistan. It is a well-known cotton-growing area.

== Administrative divisions ==
Lodhran District is spread over an area of 2,778 square kilometres and is subdivided into three tehsils (Lodhran, Kahror Pakka and Dunyapur) which contain a total of 73 Union Councils:

Tehsil	Area (km²)	Pop. (2023)	Density (ppl/km²) (2023)	Literacy rate (2023)	Union Councils
Dunyapur	889	571,333	642.67	55.66%	22
Kahror Pacca	778	547,761	704.06	49.81%	23
Lodhran	1,111	809,205	728.36	50.10%	28

== Demographics ==
Historical population
Year	Pop.	±% p.a.
1951	289,052	—
1961	363,563	+2.32%
1972	558,793	+3.98%
1981	739,912	+3.17%
1998	1,171,800	+2.74%
2017	1,699,693	+1.98%
2023	1,928,299	+2.13%

As of the 2023 census, Lodhran district has 323,866 households and a population of 1,928,299. The district has a sex ratio of 107.26 males to 100 females and a literacy rate of 51.68%: 60.63% for males and 42.12% for females. 540,664 (28.07% of the surveyed population) are under 10 years of age. 325,053 (16.86%) live in urban areas.

Religion in Lodhran district (2023)
Religion	Percent
Islam	99.56%
Christianity	0.40%
Other or not stated	0.04%

Religion in contemporary Lodhran District
Religious group	1941		2017		2023	
Religious group	Pop.	%	Pop.	%	Pop.	%
Islam	175,642	82.59%	1,695,600	99.76%	1,917,852	99.56%
Hinduism (Note: 1941 census: Including Ad-Dharmis)	33,246	15.63%	93	0.01%	97	0.01%
Sikhism	3,519	1.65%	—N/a	—N/a	24	0%
Christianity	218	0.1%	3,227	0.19%	7,613	0.40%
Ahmadi	—N/a	—N/a	710	0.04%	656	0.03%
Others (Note: Including Jainism, Buddhism, Zoroastrianism, Judaism, or not stated)	49	0.02%	63	0%	93	0%
Total Population	212,674	100%	1,699,693	100%	1,926,357	100%
Note: 1941 census data is for Lodhran tehsil of Multan District, which roughly corresponds to contemporary Lodhran district. District and tehsil borders have changed since 1941.

Languages of Lodhran district (2023)
1. Saraiki (73.8%)
2. Punjabi (15.2%)
3. Urdu (6.41%)
4. Mewati (2.19%)
5. Others (2.36%)

At the time of the 2023 census, 73.81% of the population spoke Saraiki, 15.23% Punjabi, 6.41% Urdu, and 2.19% Mewati as their first language.

The most widely spoken first language is Saraiki (70%), which is used by the major indigenous social groups of the Joya, Baloch, Awan, Arain, Kanju, Uttera/Uttero, Ghallu, Bhutta, Lodhra, Metla, Chaner Syed, Qureshi, Tareen and Pathan. Additionally, Punjabi is spoken by about 19%. The percentage of the district's population who declared Urdu as their language at the 1998 census was 9%; this includes these Haryanvi speakers as well as other, smaller, groups of Muhajirs such as the Mughal. Additionally, the nomadic Od people are speakers of the Od language, while Pashto (0.2%) is spoken by Pashtuns.
