= List of Pakistani administrative units by gross state product =

List of Pakistani first-level administrative divisions by gross state product

This is a list of Pakistani administrative units by their gross state product (GSP) (the value of the total economy, and goods and services produced in the respective administrative unit) in nominal terms. GSP is the unit-level counterpart of the national gross domestic product (GDP), the most comprehensive measure of a country's economic activity.

== Dynamics ==
Pakistan, in 2022, had a GDP (nominal) of around US$377 billion and GDP (purchasing power parity) of around Int$1.512 trillion, according to trading economics. This value can be further divided into the unit levels (GSP), providing an outlook of how much value each unit contributes to the national GDP. Pakistan has traditionally followed a "top-down" approach in its analysis of economic development; that is, authorities have scarcely attempted to break up national GDP statistics into provincial and subnational units and have focused more on the federation as a whole. Thus, many accounts of provincial GDPs that do exist have usually been projected estimates made by economists, based on the likely percentage of contribution of the respective units to the national GDP and some yearly studies. Punjab has the largest economy in Pakistan, contributing most to the national GDP. The province's share was 60.58% in 2020 to national economy. Sindh which is the second largest province in terms of population and GDP which has steadily continued to grow, contributes 23.7% to the national economy. It is featured well within the list of country subdivisions with a GDP (PPP) over $200 billion. Sindh's GDP is to a large extent influenced by the economy of Karachi.

== Administrative units by GSP (nominal) ==
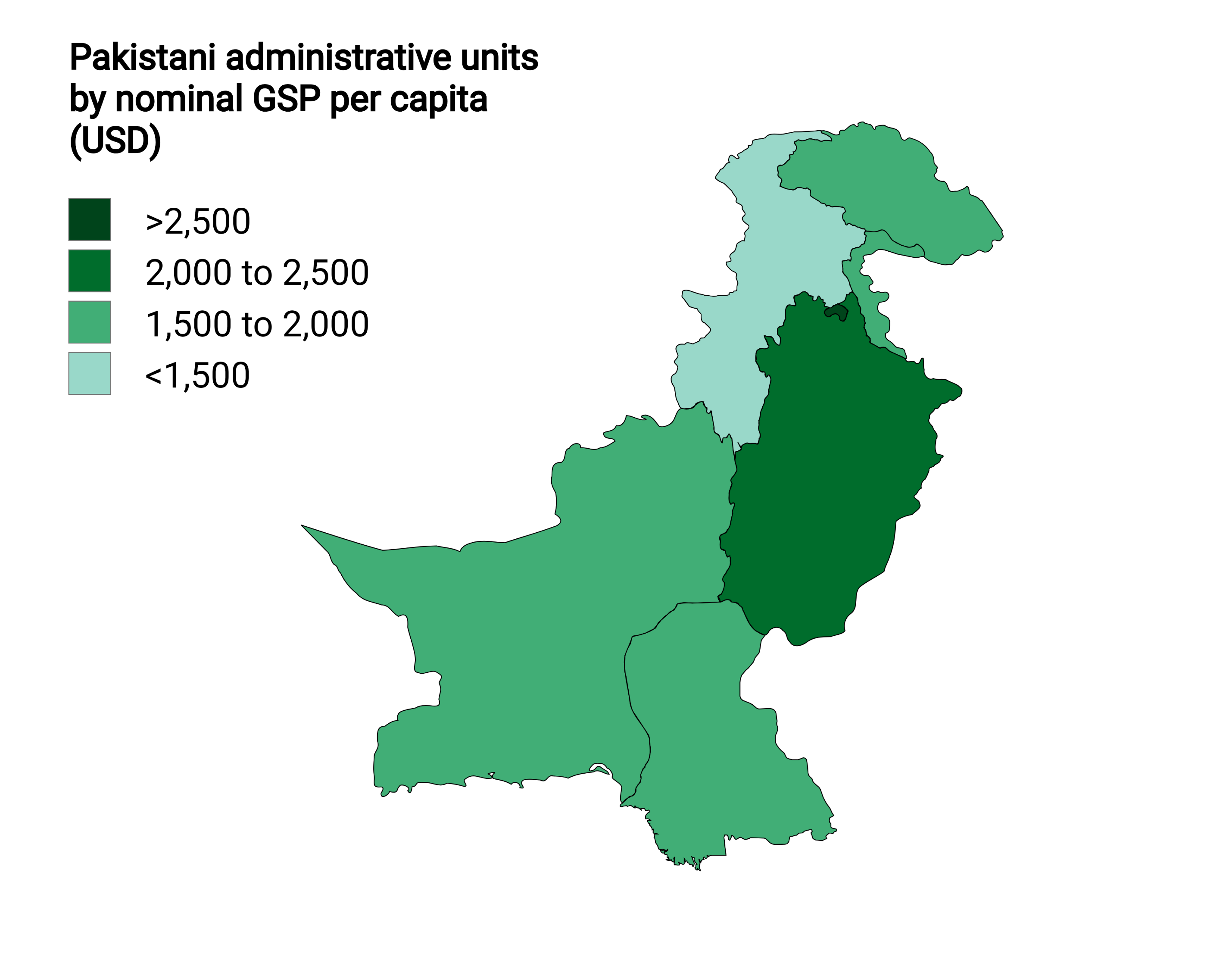
Pakistani administrative units by GSP per capita (nominal)

The following are the estimated figures of different provinces and autonomous regions of Pakistan as of 2026.

Administrative unit	GSP (Billions USD)	GSP per capita (USD)
Punjab	265.6	2,043
Sindh	103.9	1,732
Khyber Pakhtunkhwa (including former FATA)	44.9	1,123
Balochistan	23.6	1,573
(Azad Kashmir) Azad Jammu and Kashmir	5.9	1,475
Islamabad (ICT)	5.9	2,360
Gilgit Baltistan	2.9	1,450
Pakistan (GDP)	452.1 billion	$1,901

== Administrative units by GSP (PPP) ==
Followings are the estimated figures of different provinces and autonomous regions of Pakistan as of 2026.

Administrative unit	GSP (Billions Int$)	GSP per capita (Int$)
Punjab	1,272.5	9,788
Sindh	497.8	8,297
Khyber Pakhtunkhwa (including former FATA)	214.9	5,373
Balochistan	113.0	7,533
(Azad Kashmir) Azad Jammu and Kashmir	28.4	7,100
Islamabad (ICT)	28.4	11,364
Gilgit Baltistan	14.1	7,052
Pakistan (GDP)	2.166 trillion	8,453

== Cities by GDP (nominal) ==
Rank	City	Province	Nominal GDP (in USD, 2026 est.)	Share in national economy	Reference Date
1	Karachi	Sindh	$101.7 billion	22.5%	2026 (scaled estimate)
2	Lahore	Punjab	$54.3 billion	12.0%	2026 (scaled estimate)
3	Faisalabad	Punjab	$24.4 billion	5.4%	2026 (scaled estimate)
4	Gujranwala	Punjab	$22.1 billion	4.9%	2026 (scaled estimate)
5	Sialkot	Punjab	$15.4 billion	3.4%	2026 (scaled estimate)
6	Multan	Punjab	$14.0 billion	3.1%	2026 (scaled estimate)
7	Peshawar	Khyber Pakhtunkhwa	$8.1 billion	1.8%	2026 (scaled estimate)
8	Islamabad	Islamabad Capital Territory	$5.9 billion	1.3%	2026 (scaled estimate)
9	Quetta	Balochistan	$4.5 billion	1.0%	2026 (scaled estimate)
10	Rawalpindi	Punjab	$4.5 billion	1.0%	2026 (scaled estimate)

== Cities by GDP (PPP) ==
Rank	City	Province	GDP (PPP) (in USD, 2026 est.)	Share in national economy	Reference Date
1	Karachi	Sindh	$600.4 billion	22.5%	2026 (scaled estimate)
2	Lahore	Punjab	$310.9 billion	12.0%	2026 (scaled estimate)
3	Faisalabad	Punjab	$120.0 billion	5.4%	2026 (scaled estimate)
4	Gujranwala	Punjab	$106.2 billion	4.9%	2026 (scaled estimate)
5	Sialkot	Punjab	$73.6 billion	3.4%	2026 (scaled estimate)
6	Multan	Punjab	$67.2 billion	3.1%	2026 (scaled estimate)
7	Peshawar	Khyber Pakhtunkhwa	$39.0 billion	1.8%	2026 (scaled estimate)
8	Islamabad	Islamabad Capital Territory	$30.2 billion	1.3%	2026 (scaled estimate)
9	Quetta	Balochistan	$21.7 billion	1.0%	2026 (scaled estimate)
10	Rawalpindi	Punjab	$21.7 billion	1.0%	2026 (scaled estimate)
