= Punjab, Pakistan =

Province of Pakistan

Punjab پنجاب
- Province
- Province of Punjab
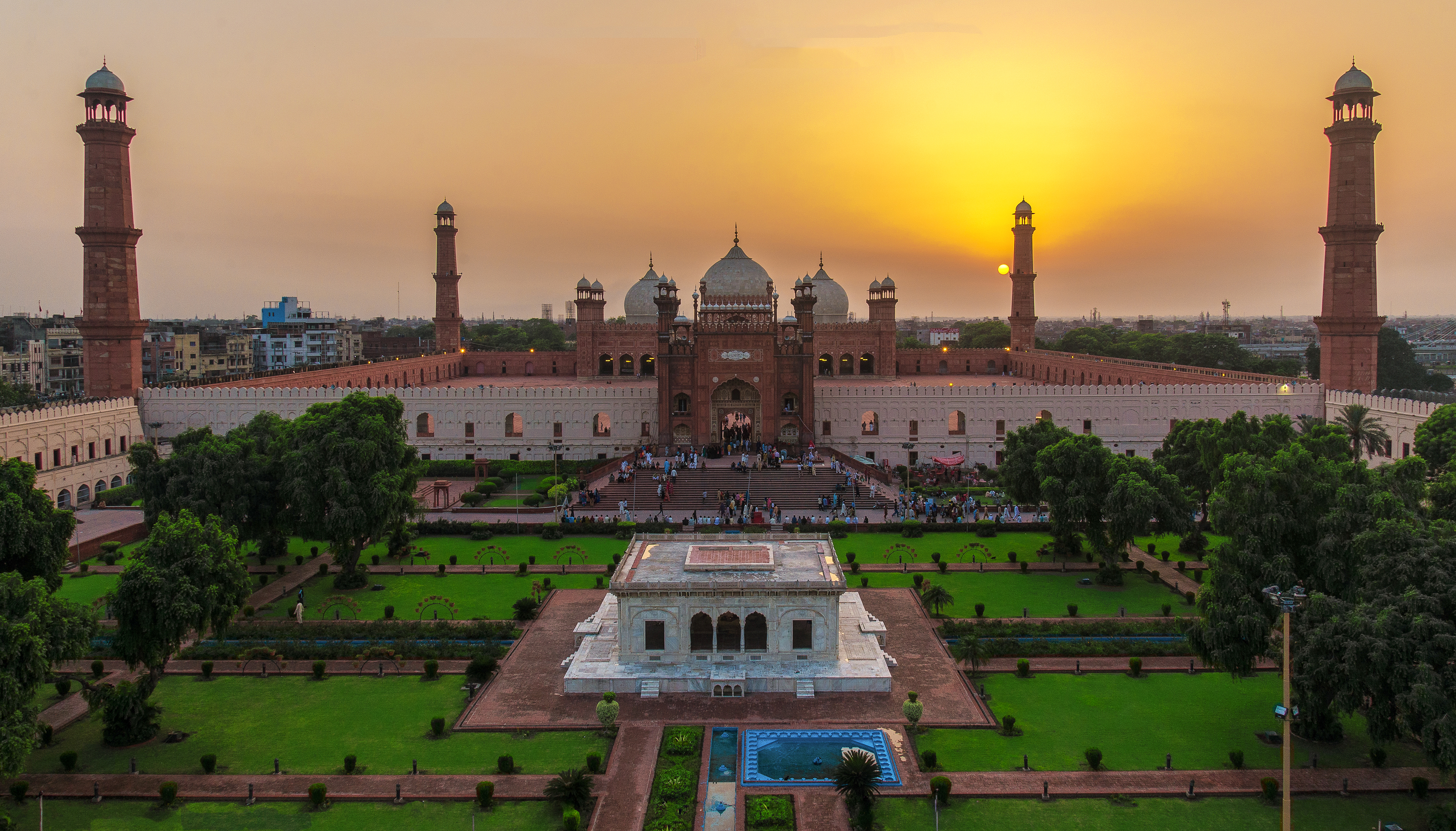
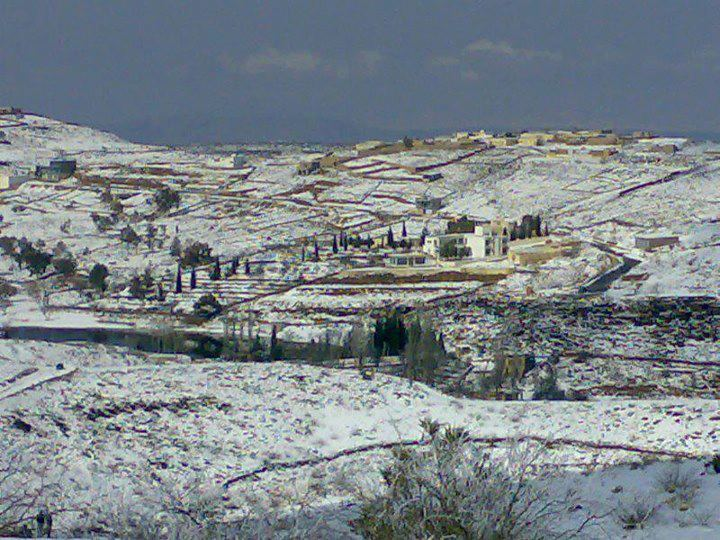
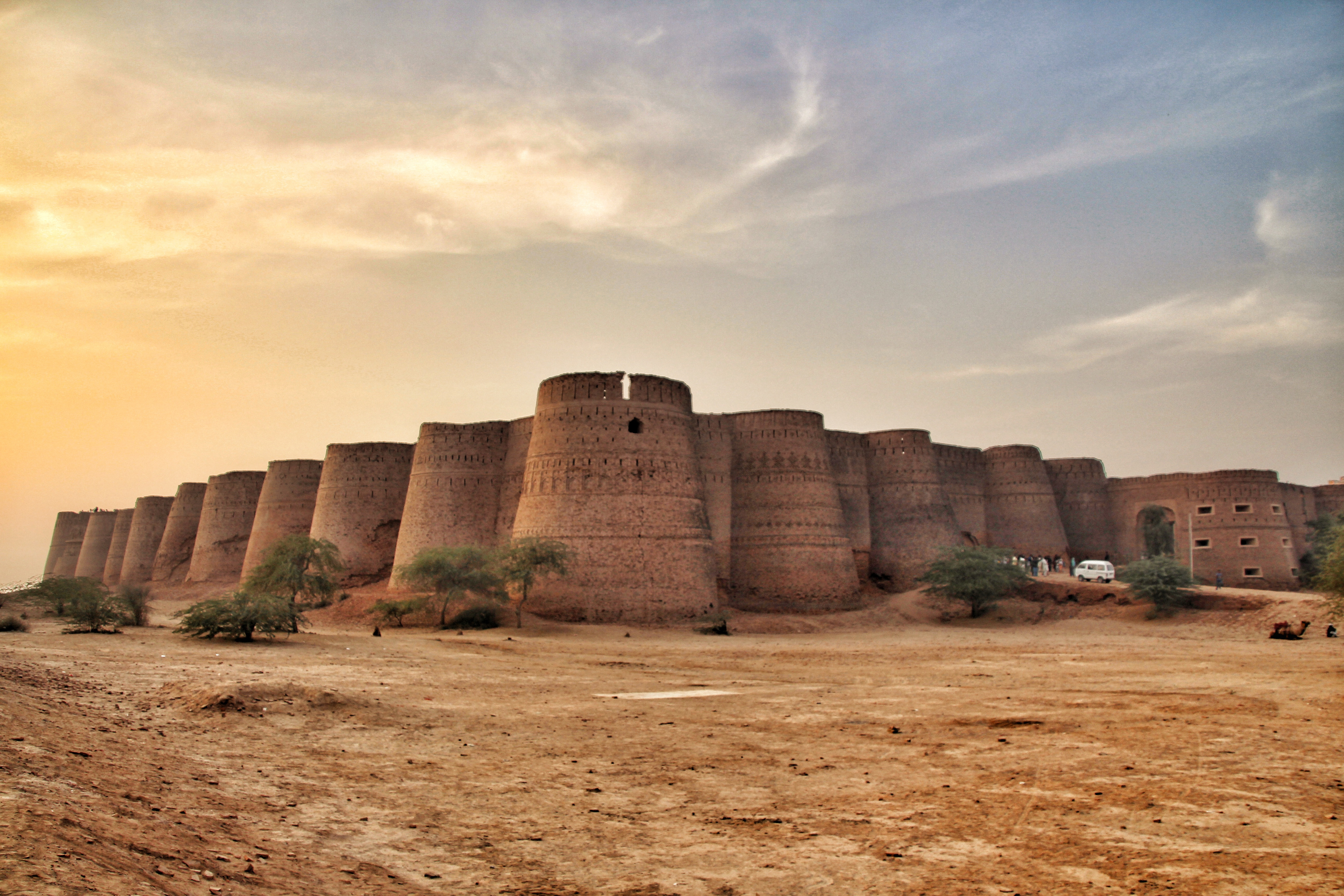
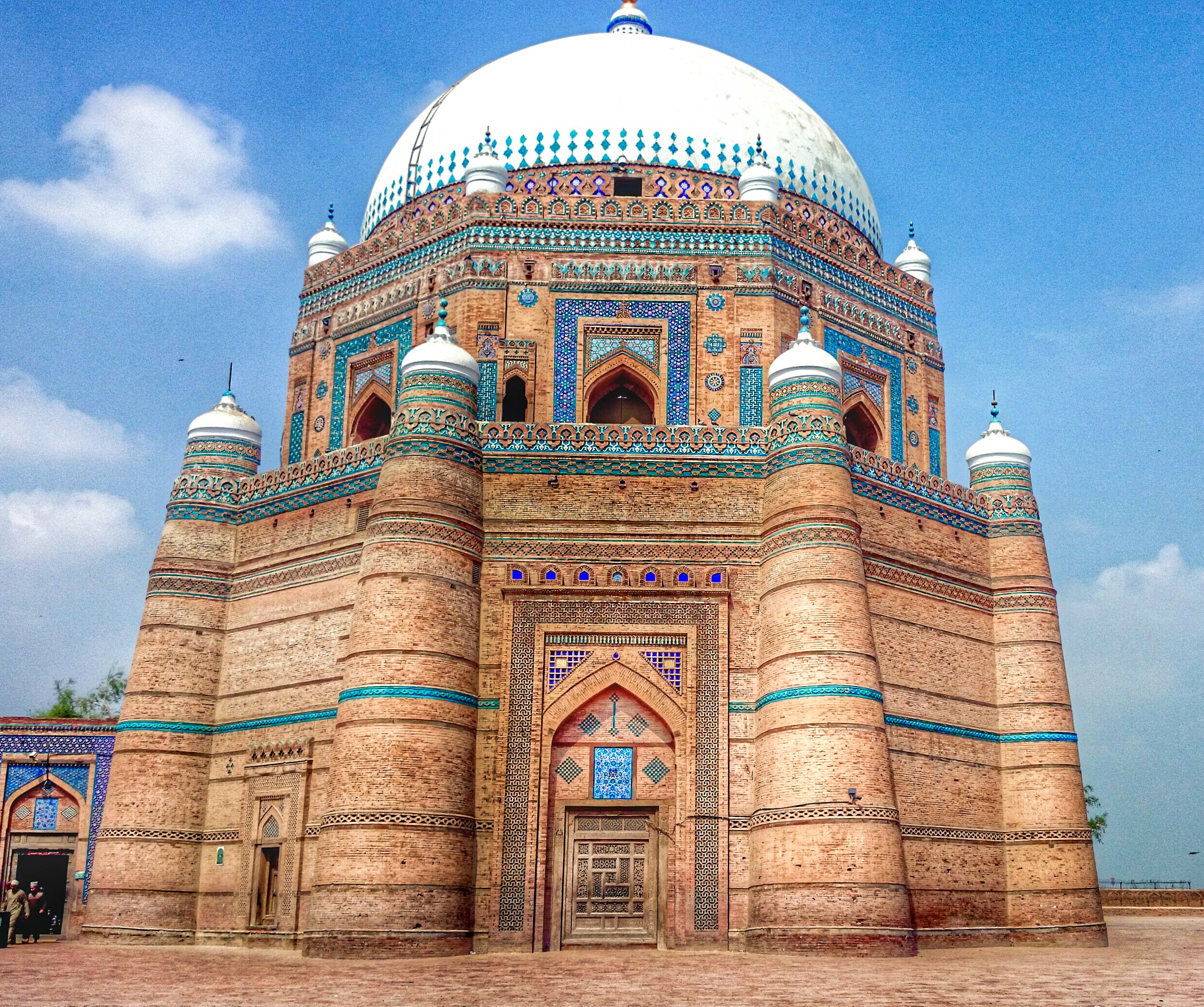
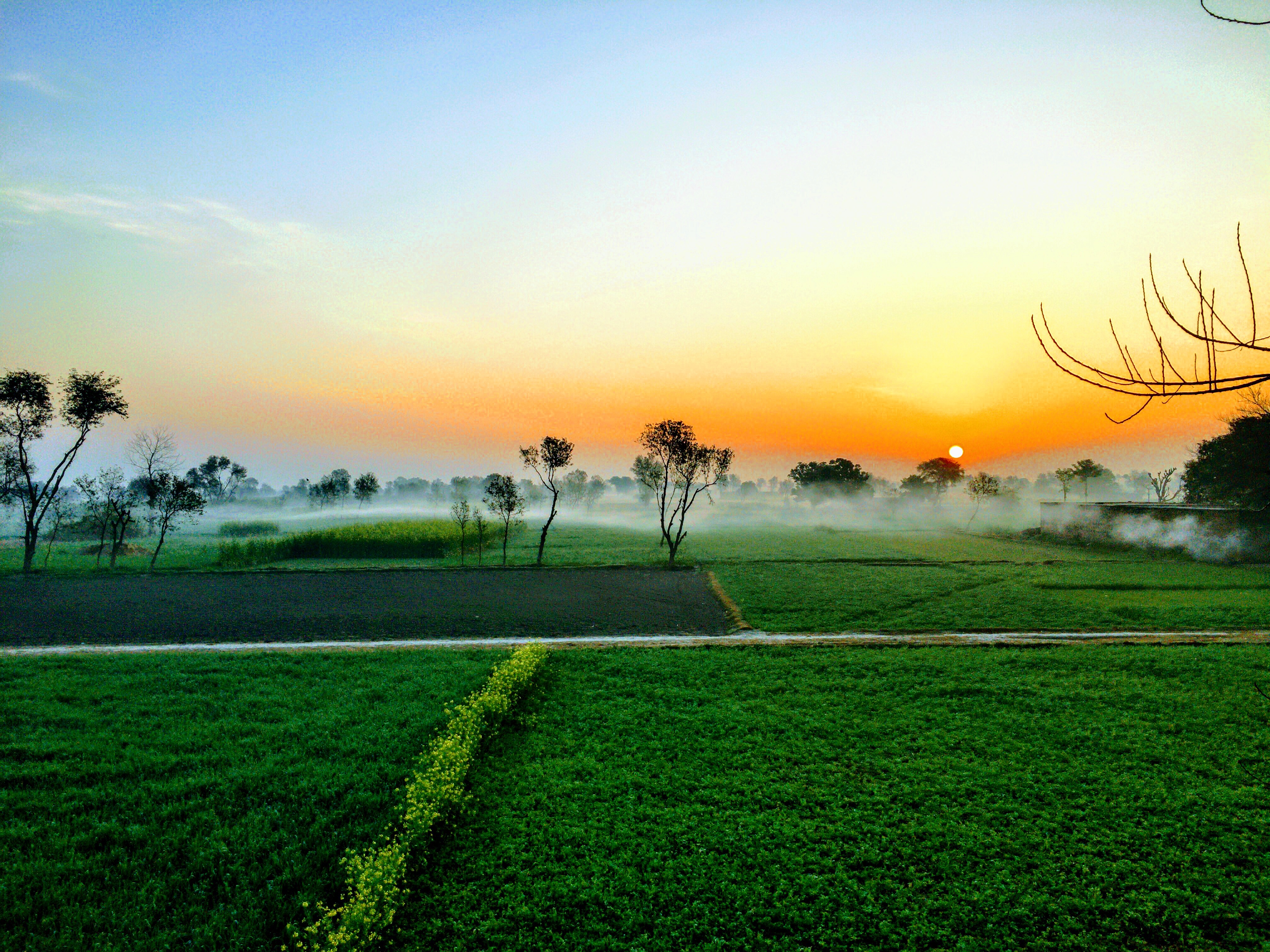
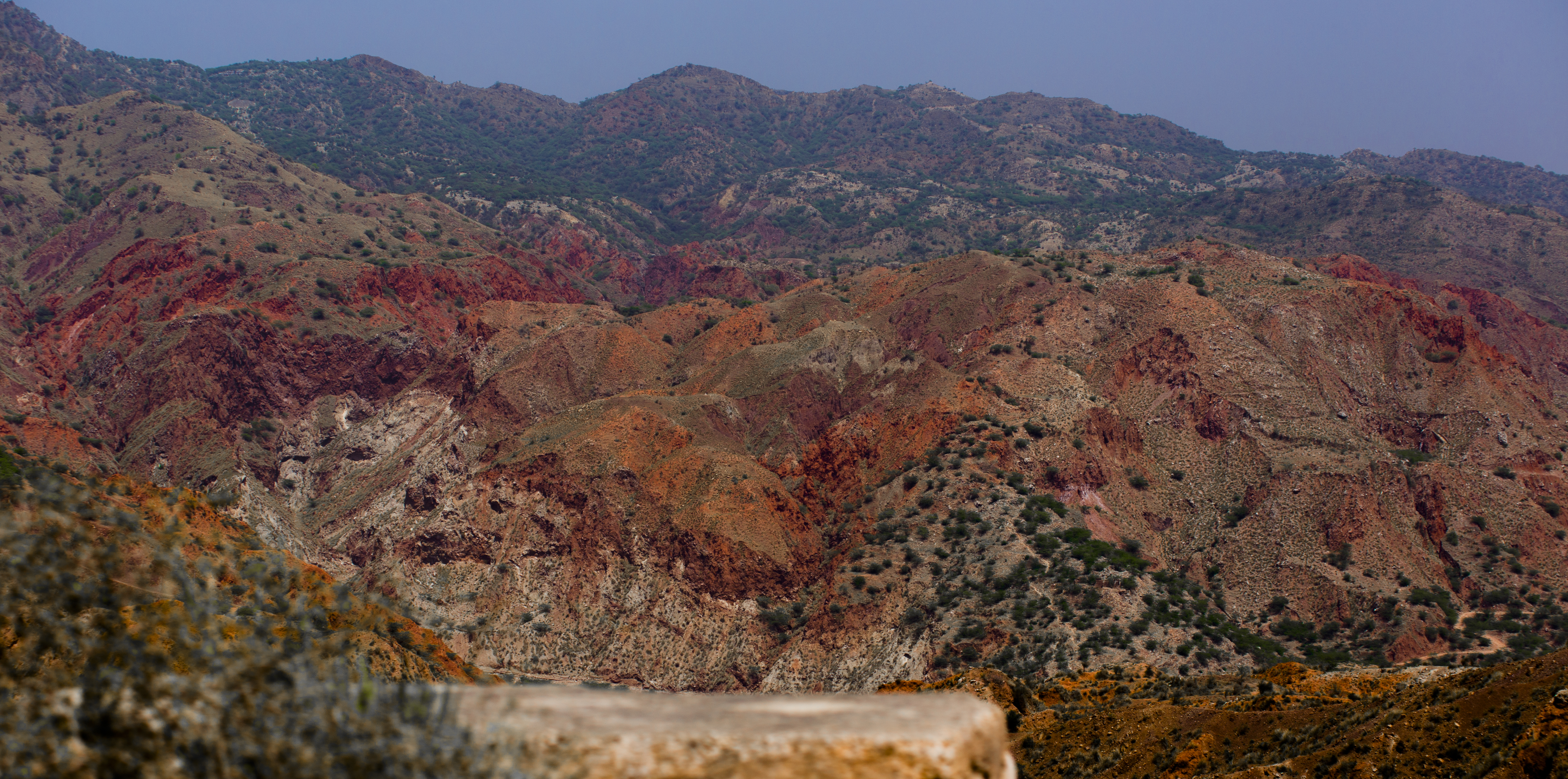
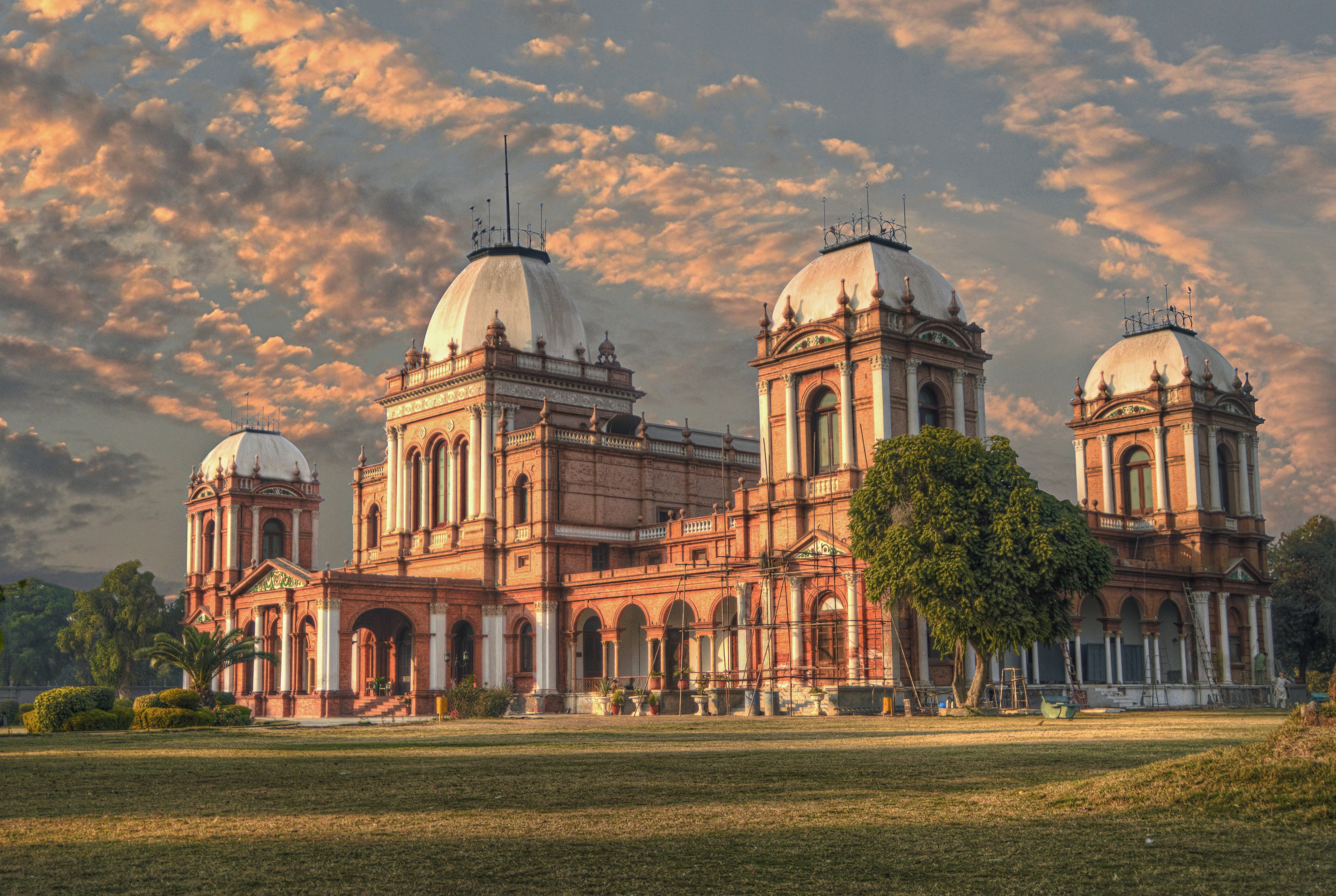
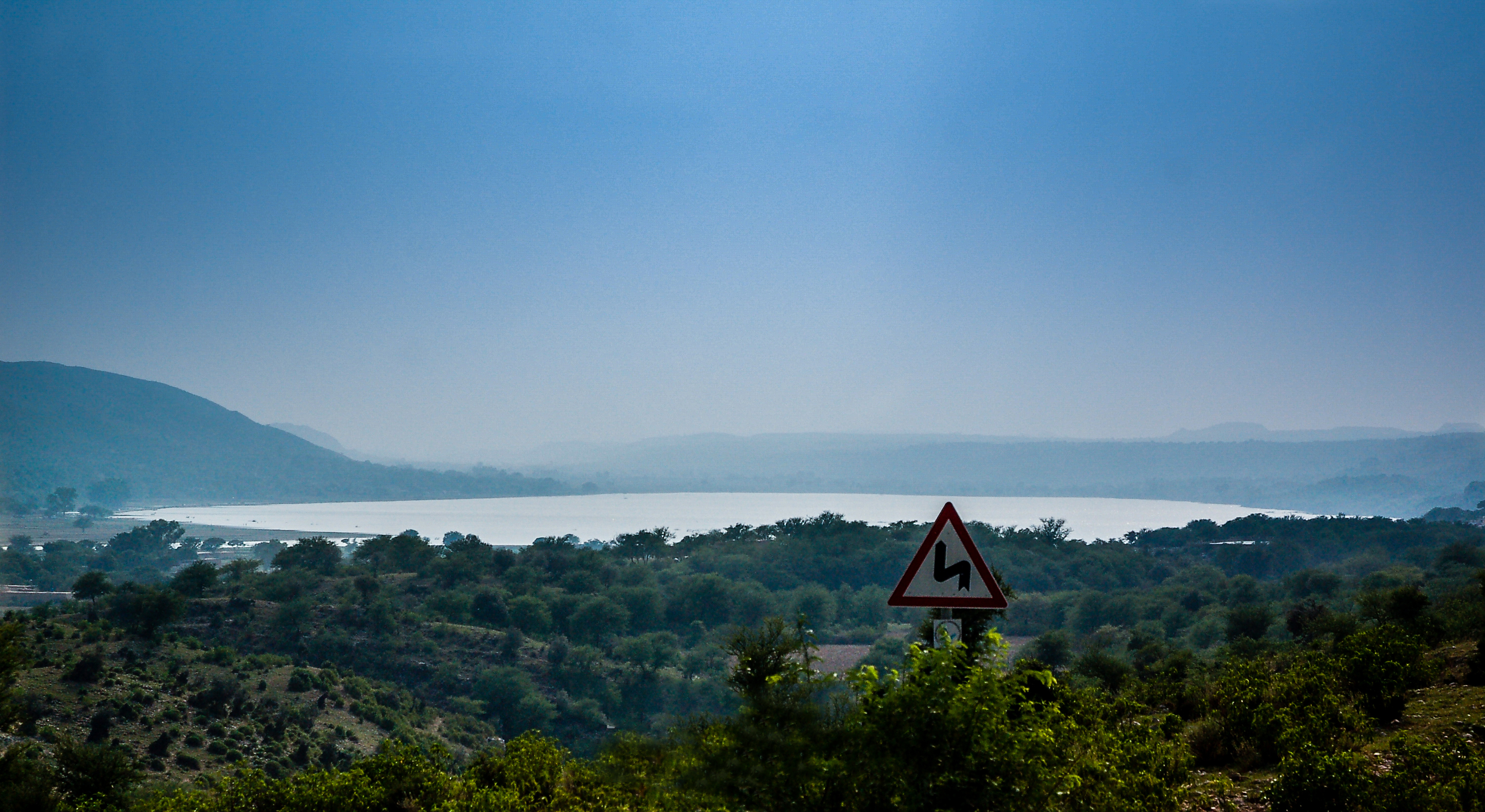
- Badshahi Mosque Fort Munro Derawar fort Tomb of Shah Rukn-e-Alam A rice field in Jhang Khewra Salt Mines Noor Mahal Khabikki Lake

- Flag Seal
- Etymology: Persian panj āb ('five waters')
- Location of Punjab within Pakistan
- Coordinates: 31°N 72°E
- Country: Pakistan
- Established: 1 July 1970; 56 years ago
- Before was: Part of West Pakistan
- Capital and largest city: Lahore
- Administrative Divisions: 10: Bahawalpur; Dera Ghazi Khan; Faisalabad; Gujranwala; Gujrat; Lahore; Multan; Sahiwal; Sargodha; Rawalpindi

Government
  - Type: Federated parliamentary government
  - Body: Government of Punjab
  - Governor: Sardar Saleem Haider Khan
  - Chief Minister: Maryam Nawaz
  - Chief Secretary: Zahid Akhtar Zaman
  - Legislature: Provincial Assembly
  - High Court: Lahore High Court

Area
  - Province: 205,344 km^{2} (79,284 sq mi)
  - Rank: 2nd

Population (2023 census)
  - Province: 127,688,922
  - Rank: 1st
  - Density: 622/km^{2} (1,610/sq mi)
  - Urban: 51,975,967 (40.71%)
  - Rural: 75,712,955 (59.29%)
- Demonym: Punjabi

GDP (nominal)
  - Total (2022): $225 billion (1st) (Note: Punjab's contribution to national economy was 60.58%, or $925 billion (PPP) and $225 billion (nominal) in 2022.)
  - Per Capita: $2,003 (2nd)

GDP (PPP)
  - Total (2022): $925 billion (1st)
  - Per Capita: $8,027 (2nd)
- Time zone: UTC+05:00 (PKT)
- ISO 3166 code: PK-PB
- Official languages: Urdu; English
- Provincial language: Punjabi (Note: No official status; just recognition as the province's language, managed under the statutory body Punjab Institute of Language, Art & Culture (PILAC).)
- Provincial sports teams: List: Lahore Qalandars; Multan Sultans; Lahore Lions; Rawalpindi Rams; Sialkot Stallions; Bahawalpur Stags; Multan Tigers; Faisalabad Wolves; Central Punjab; Southern Punjab
- Literacy rate (2023): Total: (66.25%); Male: (71.98%); Female: (60.19%)
- National Assembly seats: 183
- HDI (2017): 0.732 ▲
- Provincial Assembly seats: 371
- Divisions: 10
- Districts: 41
- Tehsils: 148
- Union councils: 7602
- Website: punjab.gov.pk

Punjab (Note: /pʌnˈdʒɑːb/ pun-JAHB; Punjabi, Urdu: پنجاب, pronounced [pəɲˈd͡ʒaːb]) is a province of Pakistan. With a population of over 127 million, it is the most populous Pakistani province and the second most populous subnational polity in the world. Located in the central-eastern region of the country, it has the largest economy, contributing the most to national GDP in Pakistan. Lahore is the capital and largest city of the province. Other major cities include Faisalabad, Rawalpindi, Gujranwala and Multan.

It is bordered by the Pakistani provinces of Khyber Pakhtunkhwa to the north-west, Balochistan to the south-west and Sindh to the south, as well as Islamabad Capital Territory to the north-west and Azad Kashmir to the north. It shares an international border with the Indian states of Rajasthan and Punjab to the east and Indian-administered Kashmir to the north-east.

The province forms the bulk of the transnational Punjab region, partitioned in 1947 between Pakistan and India. The most fertile province of the country, Punjab is considered the breadbasket of the nation, in addition to being the most industrialised. It is one of the more urbanised regions in South Asia, with approximately 40 per cent of its population being urban.

Punjabi Muslims form majority of the province. Their culture has been strongly influenced by Islamic culture and Sufism, with a number of Sufi shrines located across the province. Punjab hosts several UNESCO World Heritage Sites, including the Shalimar Gardens, the Lahore Fort, the archaeological excavations at Taxila, and the Rohtas Fort, among others.

== Etymology ==
The name "Punjab" consists of two parts (پنج, panj, 'five' and آب, āb, 'water'), from Persian which are cognates of the Sanskrit words (पञ्‍च, pañca, 'five' and अप्, áp, 'water'). The word pañj-āb is thus calque of Indo-Aryan pañca-áp and means "The Land of Five Waters", referring to the rivers Jhelum, Chenab, Ravi, Sutlej, and Beas. All are tributaries of the Indus River, Sutlej being the longest. (Note: Alternatively, Indus, Jhelum, Chenab, Ravi and Sutlej are counted among the five rivers of Punjab, with Beas considered as a tributary of Sutlej.) References to a land of five rivers are found in the Mahabharata, in which one of the regions is named as Panchanada (Sanskrit: पञ्चनद, romanised: pañca-nada, lit. 'five rivers'). The ancient Greeks referred to the region as Pentapotamía (Greek: Πενταποταμία, lit. 'land of five rivers'). Earlier, Punjab was also known as Sapta Sindhu in the Rigveda and Hapta Hendu in the Avesta, translating into "The Land of Seven Rivers"; the other two being Indus and Kabul which are included in the greater Punjab region.

The 14th-century author Ayn al-Mulk Mahru referred to the region as the wilayat of Punjab (ولایت وسیعۀ پنجاب, 'vast realm of Punjab') in Insha-i-Mahru; Punjab finds mention in the travelogue of Ibn Battuta and in the Tarikh-i-Wassaf of Ilkhanid historian Wassaf as well. The current name gained currency during the Mughal period. A term used in the Punjabi language for the Pakistani province is Lehnda Punjab while Indian Punjab is known as Chardha Punjab.

== History ==
=== Ancient period ===
The earliest evidence of human habitation in Punjab is traced to the Soan Valley of the Pothohar, between the Indus and the Jhelum rivers, where Soanian culture developed between 774,000 BCE and 11,700 BCE. This period goes back to the first interglacial period in the Ice age, from which remnants of stone and flint tools have been found. The Punjab region was the site of one of the earliest cradles of civilisation, the Bronze Age Harrapan civilisation that flourished from about 3000 BCE and declined rapidly 1,000 years later, followed by the Indo-Aryan migrations that overran the region in waves between 1500 and 500 BCE. The migrating Indo-Aryan tribes gave rise to the Iron Age Vedic civilisation, which lasted till 500 BCE. During this period, the Rigveda was composed in Punjab, laying the foundation of Hinduism. Frequent intertribal wars in the post-Vedic period stimulated the growth of larger groupings ruled by chieftains and kings, who ruled local kingdoms known as Mahajanapadas. Achaemenid emperor Darius the Great crossed the Indus in 518 BCE and annexed the land up to the river Jhelum. Taxila in Gandhara was the site of one of the oldest education centre of South Asia and was probably capital of the Achaemenid province of Hindush.

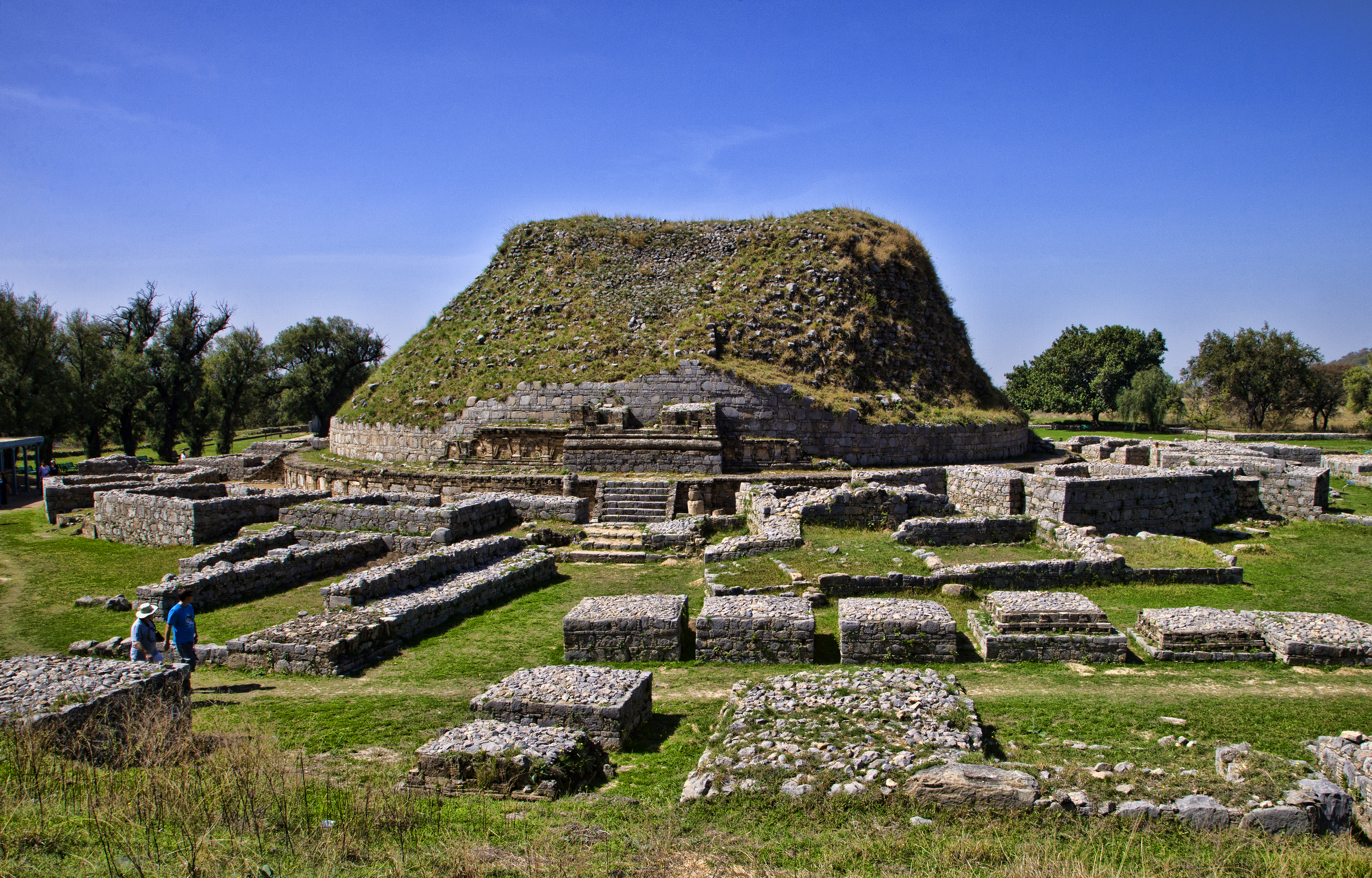
Dharmarajika Stupa, a 3rd-century BCE Buddhist world heritage site at Taxila

One of the early kings in Punjab was Porus, who fought in the Battle of the Hydaspes against Alexander the Great. The battle is thought to have resulted in a decisive Greek victory; however, A. B. Bosworth warns against an uncritical reading of Greek sources who were obviously exaggerative. Porus refused to surrender and wandered about atop an elephant, until he was wounded and his force routed. When asked by Alexander how he wished to be treated, Porus replied "Treat me as a king would treat another king". Despite the apparently one-sided results, Alexander was impressed by Porus and chose to reinstate him. The battle is historically significant because it resulted in the syncretism of ancient Greek political and cultural influences on the Indian subcontinent, yielding works such as Greco-Buddhist art, which continued to have an impact for the ensuing centuries. In south-central Punjab, the Mallians, together with nearby tribes, gathered a large army to face the Greek army. During the siege of the Mallian citadel, Alexander leaped into its inner area, where he was wounded by an arrow that had penetrated his lung, leaving him severely injured. The city was conquered after a fierce battle.

The region was then ceded by Seleucus I Nicator to the Maurya Empire in 302 BCE. Indo-Greeks became established in the region after campaigns of Greco-Bactrian Demetrius in 180 BCE; their greatest ruler, Menander had Sagala (present-day Sialkot) as capital. Menander is noted for becoming a patron and converting to Greco-Buddhism. Migrating central Asian tribes of Saka became entrenched in Punjab under Maues but were soon replaced by Pahlavas led by Gondophares, last of whom was the Apraca king Sases. By the middle of the first century CE, Kushans had expanded into the region and would go on to rule in Punjab for the next three hundred years, until their kingdom was destroyed in the Huns' invasions, most notable of whom was Alchon Hun Mihirakula (r. 515–542).

=== Medieval period ===
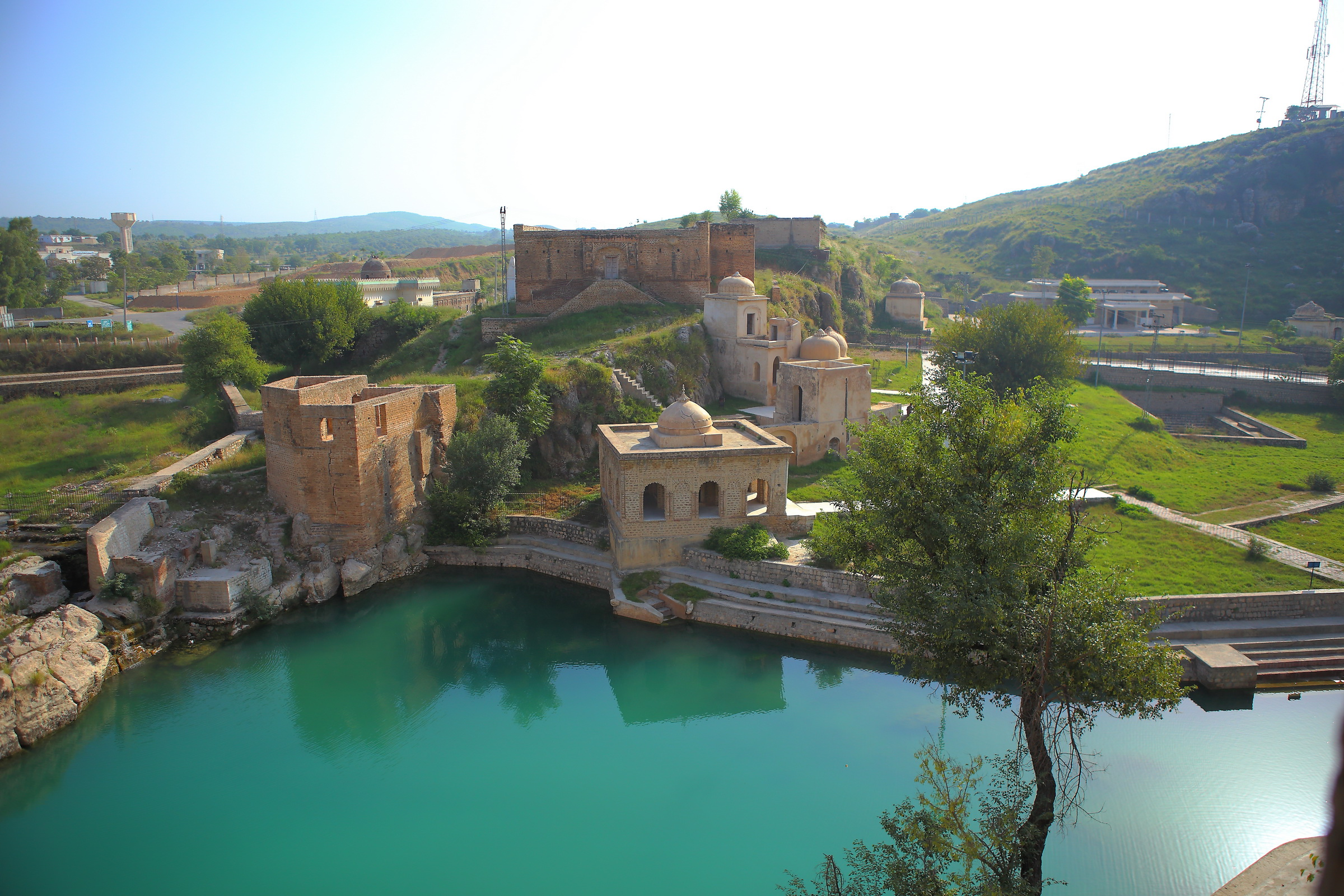
Katas Raj, a large complex consisting of Buddhist stupas, havelis and over a dozen Hindu temples, earliest of which date to the 6th century CE.

The Buddhist monk Xuanzang visited Punjab in the 7th century CE and described a large kingdom called Takka, which according to him covered territory between Indus and Sutlej and had capital at Sialkot. Following the Muslim conquests in the beginning of the 8th century, Arab armies of the Umayyad Caliphate advanced into Indus Valley, introducing Islam in Punjab. Their decline was followed by formation of various Arab-ruled principalities, notably the Emirate of Multan, in the 9th century, coinciding with the rise of the Odi Shahi dynasty of Gandhara in the northern Punjab and Kabulistan.

Ghaznavids and Ghurids

Punjab was annexed by the Ghaznavid dynasty in the 11th century. Peshawar was conquered by Mahmud of Ghazni after defeating maharaja Jayapala of Punjab in 1001. The ruler of Multan, Abul Fateh Daud was defeated in 1010. Nandana, the last Shahi capital, fell in 1014 and Punjab became part of expanding Ghaznavid Empire. Lahore became secondary, and after 1163, sole capital of the Ghaznavids. They gradually declined as a power until the Ghurids conquered Lahore under Muhammad of Ghor in 1186, deposing the last Ghaznavid king Khusrau Malik.

After the assassination of Muhammad of Ghor at Dhamiak in 1206, the Ghurid state fragmented and was replaced by the Delhi Sultanate in the Indo-Gangetic plains. The Delhi Sultanate ruled Punjab for the next several centuries, led by five unrelated dynasties.

Delhi Sultanate

The first ruler of Delhi Sultanate was Qutb ud-Din Aibak, a mamluk, who died in Lahore while playing polo in 1210. Following his death his successor Iltutmish transferred capital from Lahore to Delhi. The relocation of regional centre was necessitated by the rise of Mongol Empire in the west. Mongols under Genghis Khan first invaded Punjab in 1221 while chasing the retreating armies of Khwarezmian prince Jalal al-Din Mangburni; Genghis Khan annihilated the Khwarezmians at the Battle of the Indus besides modern Attock. Mongols plundered Punjab plains but returned due to the hot climate of Punjab.

Throughout the 13th-century, Punjab bore the brunt of numerous Mongol invasions, and the towns of Lahore, Multan and Dipalpur were repeatedly sacked. Mamluk sultan Balban led several campaigns against them. Alauddin Khilji and his generals Zafar Khan, Nusrat Khan, Ulugh Khan and Malik Kafur inflicted a series of defeats over them and large-scale raids by Mongol khanates stopped. Ghiyath al-Din Tughlaq, the former governor of Multan and Dipalpur, founded the Tughlaq dynasty in 1320. Earlier, he had served as the governor of Multan and had fought twenty-eight battles against Mongols from his base at Dipalpur, preserving Punjab and Sind from their advances. The mother of Ghiyath al-Din was from Punjab, as was the mother of Firuz Shah Tughlaq, who became the emperor in 1351.

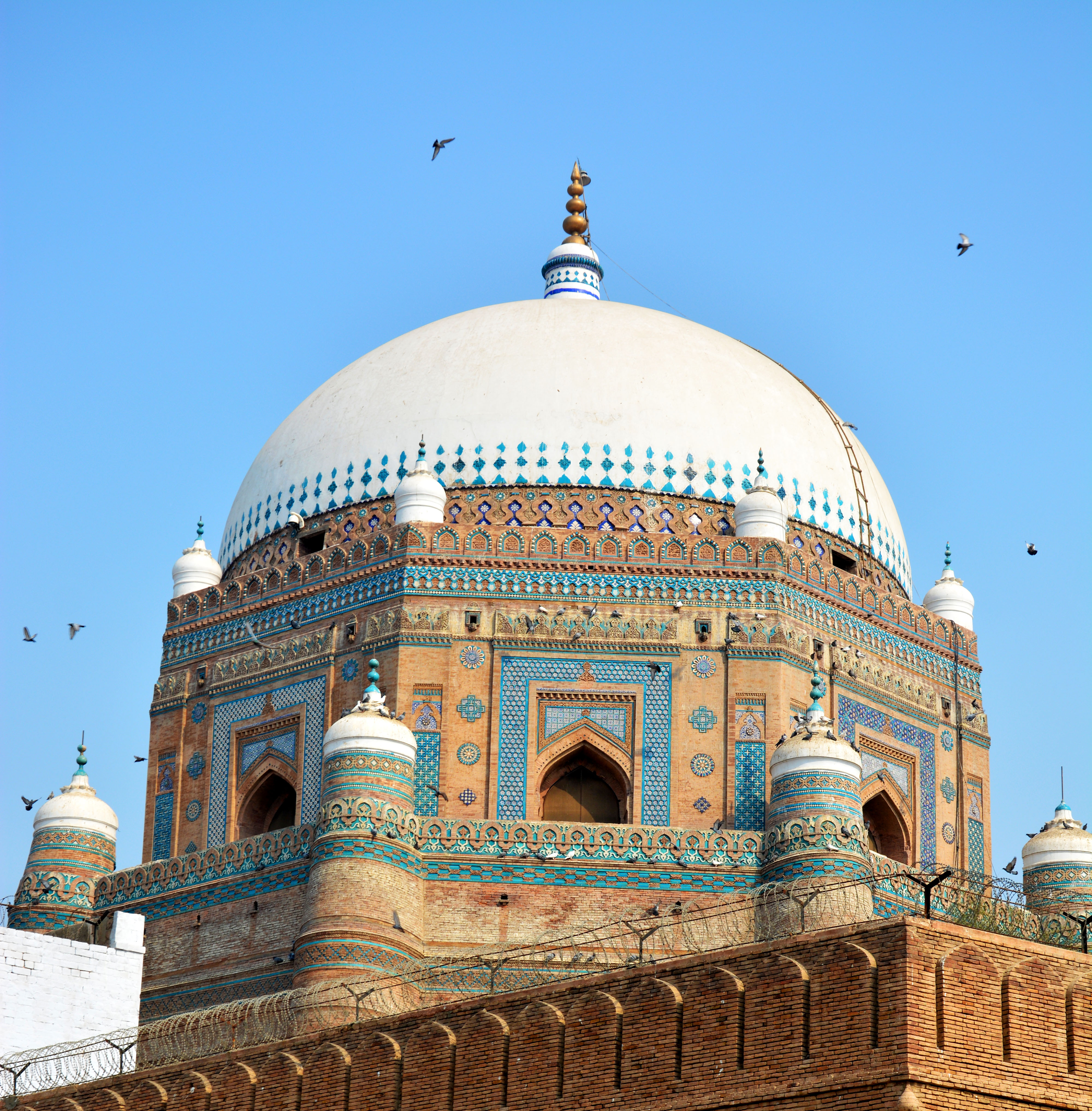
The 14th-century mausoleum of Shah Rukn Alam features buttresses in each of its 8 corners, and incorporates elements of Tughluq military architecture.

The Tughlaq dynasty declined towards the end of 14th century. In 1398 Delhi Sultanate faced a devastating invasion by Emir Timur, who massacred the citizens of Delhi and Multan. Following his return, Khizr Khan established the Sayyid dynasty, the fourth dynasty of the Delhi Sultanate, with four rulers ruling from 1414 to 1451 for 37 years. Variously described as a Sayyid or a Khokhar chief, Khizr Khan initially ruled as the Timurid vassal of Multan, and conquered Delhi in 1414. During the reign of his successor Mubarak Shah, large parts of Punjab were conquered by Punjabi chieftain Jasrath and Mubarak Shah spent his reign fighting against him. Sayyids ruled the sultanate until they were displaced by the Lodi dynasty in 1451, when the last of the Sayyids, Ala ud-Din, voluntarily abdicated the throne of the Delhi Sultanate in favour of Bahlul Khan Lodi. Guru Nanak, the founder of Sikhism, was born in the town of Nankana Sahib in 1470.

Langah Sultanate

In 1445, Rai Sahra, chief of Langah tribe, established the Langah Sultanate in Multan. The sultanate included southern and central Punjab. A large number of Baloch settlers arrived and the towns of Dera Ghazi Khan and Dera Ismail Khan were founded.

=== Modern period ===
==== Mughal Empire ====
The Mughal emperor Babur defeated the Lodis in 1526, establishing Mughal Empire. During Mughal period Punjab region was divided into two provinces: Multan and Lahore. They were created as one of the original twelve subahs of the empire under the administrative reforms carried out by Akbar in 1580. By the 16th century, Punjabi Muslims were the majority in the region and an elaborate network of mosques and mausoleums marked the landscape. Some of them chose to enter Mughal bureaucracy and rose to the highest ranks, notably the grand vizier Sa'adullah Khan and the military general Shahbaz Khan. The period was also marked by the initial flourishing of Punjabi literature. A number of scholars and poets including Shah Hussain, Sultan Bahu, Abdullah Lahori, Bulleh Shah, Abdul Hakim Sialkoti, Mita Chenabi and Waris Shah wrote their works in the Mughal period.

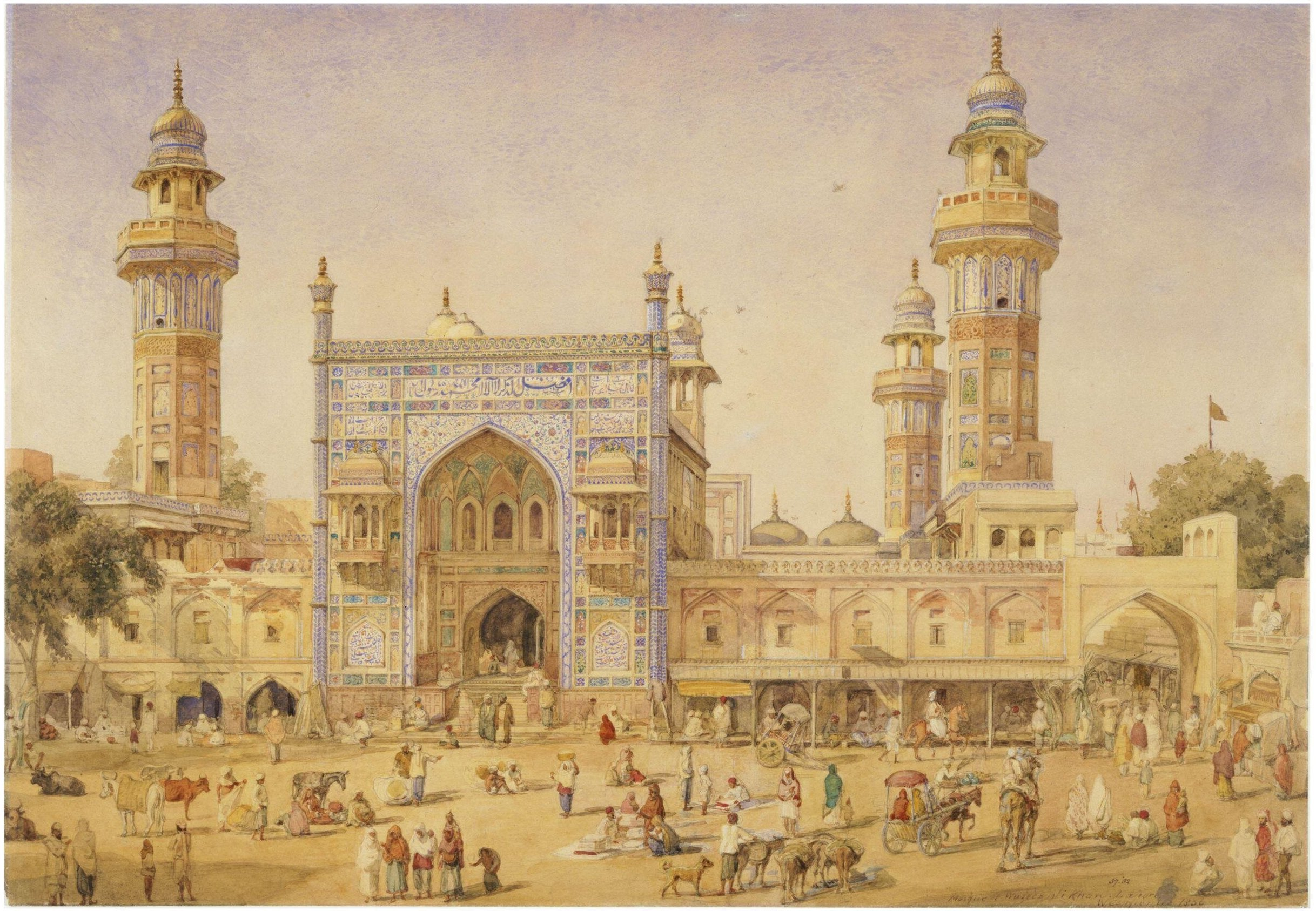
A painting of Wazir Khan Mosque in 1856. It was founded by Wazir Khan, a Punjabi viceroy of Shah Jahan, in 1634 and shows regional architectural influences.

The Mughal Empire ruled the region until it was severely weakened in the eighteenth century. After the death of the last viceroy, Adina Arain in 1758, large parts of Punjab were incorporated into Durrani Empire. The decline of Mughals resulted in the rise of Sikh principalities, called misls, as well as several Punjabi Muslim polities, notably those of Chattha clan, Gakhar clan and Sial clan. The 18th century was marked by constant warfare between these principalities and by several foreign invasions.

Ranjit Singh, born in Gujranwala in the ruling family of one such principality, established the Sikh Empire which ruled Punjab from 1799 until the British annexed it in 1849 following the First and Second Anglo-Sikh wars.

==== British rule ====
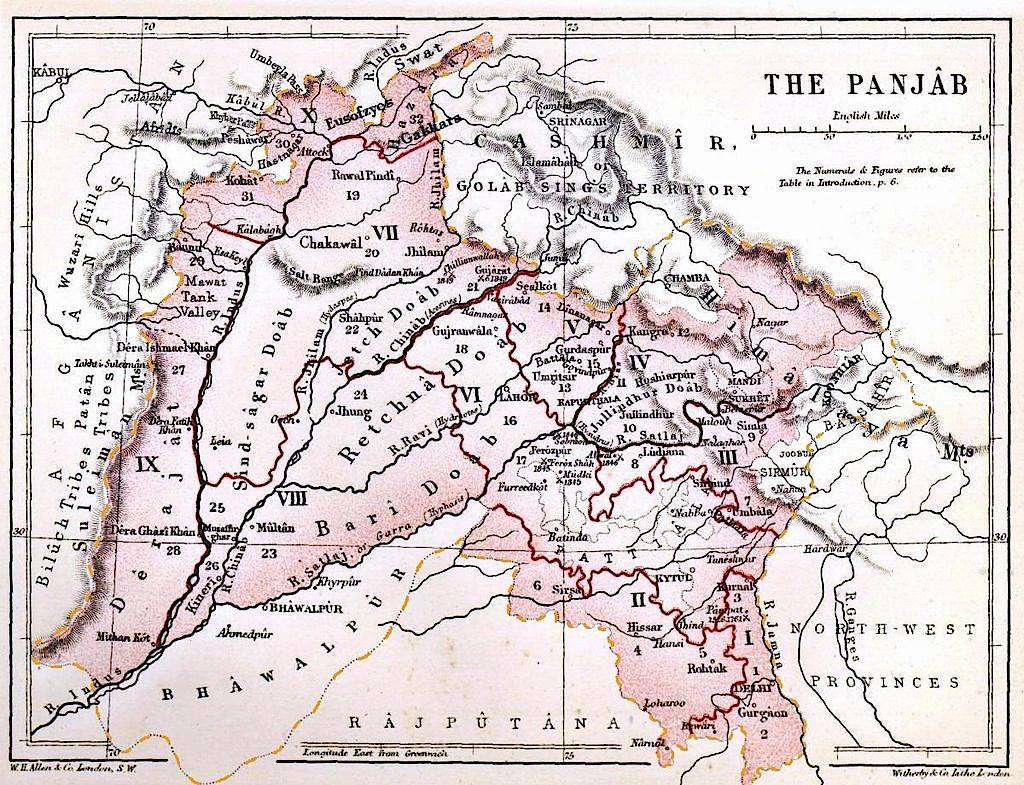
Punjab region under British rule on a world map

Most of the Punjab formed a province of British India, though a number of princely states retained local rulers who recognised British authority. In the Revolt of 1857, a Kharal sardar, Rai Ahmad Khan, led a rebellion against the British Raj in the Bar region, as did the Dhund tribe in Murree. However, most Punjabis were divided with regards to their allegiance and many did not feel loyalty towards the Mughal emperor in Delhi. The British recruited a number of Sikh, Pathan and Muslim troops to quell the revolt. The Punjab with its rich farmlands became one of the most important colonial assets. Lahore was a noted center of learning and culture, and Rawalpindi became an important military installation.

A large number of Punjabis were recruited in the British Indian Army during World War I, even though the Punjab remained a source of anti-colonial activities. Disturbances in the region increased as the war continued. At the end of the war, high casualty rates, heavy taxation, inflation, and a widespread influenza epidemic disrupted Punjabi society. In 1919 a British officer ordered his troops to fire on a crowd of demonstrators, mostly Sikhs in Amritsar. The Jallianwala massacre fuelled the Indian independence movement. Nationalists declared the independence of India from Lahore in 1930 but were quickly suppressed. Various social and independence movements and organisations originated from or had prominent influence in Punjab against the British during first half of 20th century, such as Silk Letter movement, Ghadar movement, Khaksar movement, and Majlis-e Ahrar-e Islam.

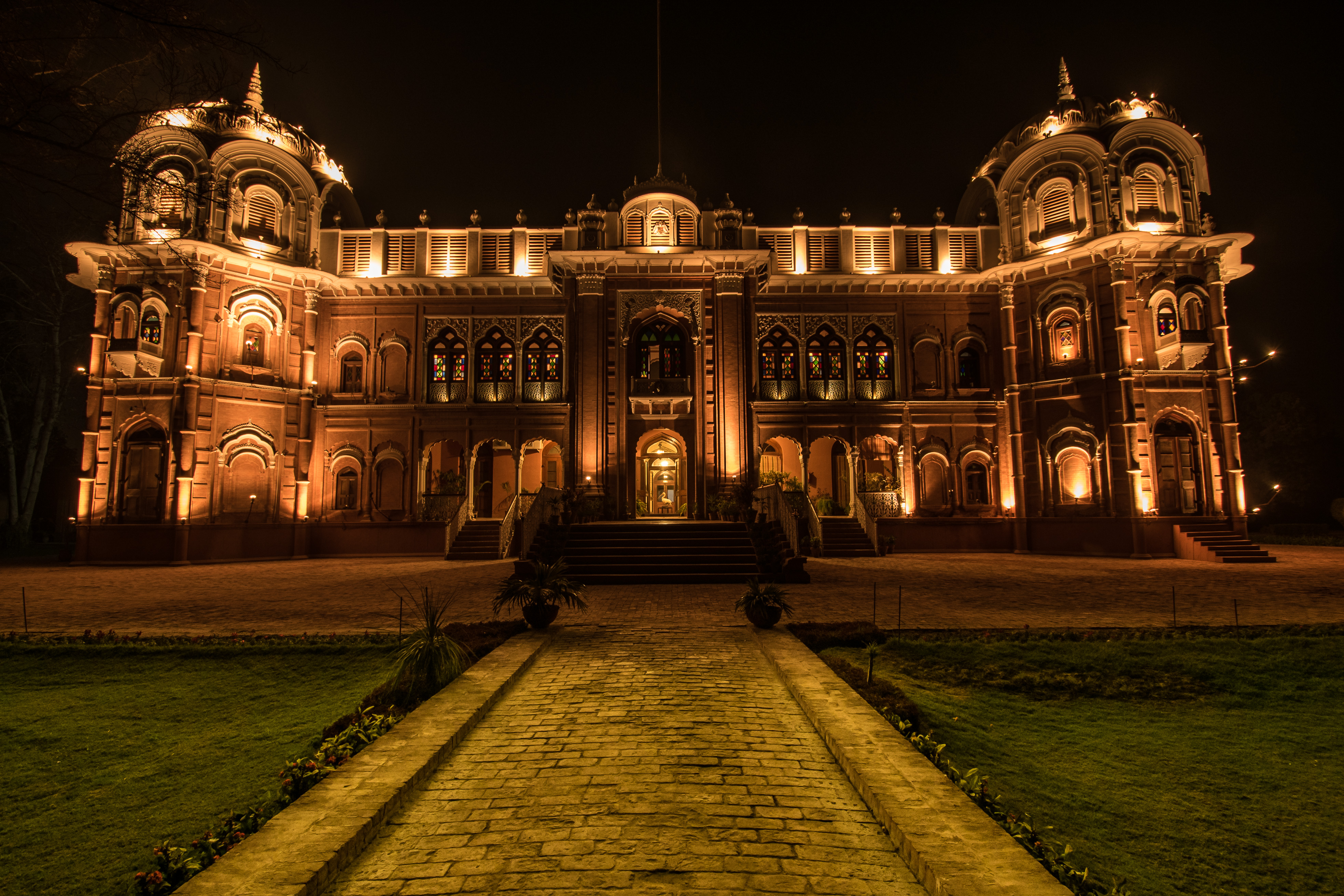
Darbar palace of the Nawabs of Bahawalpur. Established in the 18th century, Bahawalpur was the largest of the princely states in the Punjab States Agency.

When the Second World War broke out, nationalism in British India had already divided into religious movements. Many Sikhs and other minorities supported the Hindus, who promised a secular multicultural and multireligious society, and Muslim leaders in Lahore passed a resolution to work for a Muslim state (later called Pakistan), making the Punjab region a center of growing conflict between Indian and Pakistani nationalists. At the end of the war, the British granted separate independence to India and Pakistan, setting off massive communal violence as Muslims fled to Pakistan and Hindu and Sikh Punjabis fled east to India.

The British Raj had major political, cultural, philosophical, and literary consequences in the Punjab, including the establishment of a new system of education. During the independence movement, many Punjabis played a significant role, including Inayatullah Khan Mashriqi, Agha Shorish Kashmiri, Syed Ata Ullah Shah Bukhari, Madan Lal Dhingra, Sukhdev Thapar, Bhagat Singh, Udham Singh, Kartar Singh Sarabha, Bhai Parmanand, Choudhry Rahmat Ali, and Lala Lajpat Rai.

==== After independence ====
At the time of partition in 1947, the province was split into East and West Punjab. East Punjab (48%) became part of India, while West Punjab (52%) became part of Pakistan. The Punjab bore the brunt of the civil unrest following partition, with casualties estimated to be in the millions.

Another major consequence of partition was the sudden shift towards religious homogeneity that occurred in all districts across Punjab owing to the new international border that cut through the province. This rapid demographic shift was primarily due to wide-scale migration but also caused by large-scale religious cleansing riots which were witnessed across the region at the time. According to historical demographer Tim Dyson, in the eastern regions of Punjab that ultimately became Indian Punjab following independence, districts that were 66% Hindu in 1941 became 80% Hindu in 1951; those that were 20% Sikh became 50% Sikh in 1951. Conversely, in the western regions of Punjab that ultimately became Pakistani Punjab, all districts became almost exclusively Muslim by 1951 and retained a significant Christian minority, which number around 400,000.

In 1955, the province of Punjab along with other provinces and princely states was abolished and West Pakistan was created, however earlier administrative units were restored in 1970. A territory was carved out of Punjab during the period to establish Islamabad, the national capital; in 1960, Ayub government agreed to recognise sole rights of India over the use of water of the three eastern rivers of Punjab under Indus River Treaty, causing severe damage to the agricultural sector and water resources in the eastern areas of the province. The 1973 constitution of Pakistan formalised a federal structure in the country. Following the Soviet invasion of Afghanistan in 1979, the large-scale migration of Afghan refugees coupled with the rise of global jihadism adversely affected the social fabric of the country, including Punjab, effects of which would only get more prominent after the NATO-led invasion of Afghanistan in 2001 and increase in terrorism.

The Sharif Chief Ministership (2008–2018) was noted for decrease in terrorism, expansion of infrastructure such as motorways and Orange Train projects, and the business friendly policies, but also criticised for the rise in corruption and the perceived unequal spending on a few urban centres in northeastern Punjab. The succeeding Buzdar Chief Ministership was generally viewed negatively and associated with economic difficulties, inadequate response to the disastrous floods and the COVID-associated economic recession. After 2024 elections, Maryam Nawaz became the first female chief minister of Punjab, although the elections were widely described as unfair.

== Geography ==
Punjab is Pakistan's second largest province by area after Balochistan with an area of 205,344 square kilometres (79,284 square miles). It occupies 25.8% of the total landmass of Pakistan. Punjab province is bordered by Sindh to the south, the province of Balochistan to the southwest, the province of Khyber Pakhtunkhwa to the west, and the Islamabad Capital Territory and Azad Kashmir in the north. Punjab borders Jammu and Kashmir in the north, and the Indian states of Punjab and Rajasthan to the east.

The undivided Punjab region was home to six rivers, of which five flow through Pakistan's Punjab province. From west to east, the rivers are: the Indus, Jhelum, Chenab, Ravi and Sutlej. The land bounded by two rivers is called Doab; Punjab province has four doabs i.e Sind Sagar, Jech, Rachna and Bari. It is the only province that touches every other province; it also surrounds the federal enclave of the national capital city of Islamabad.

=== Topography ===
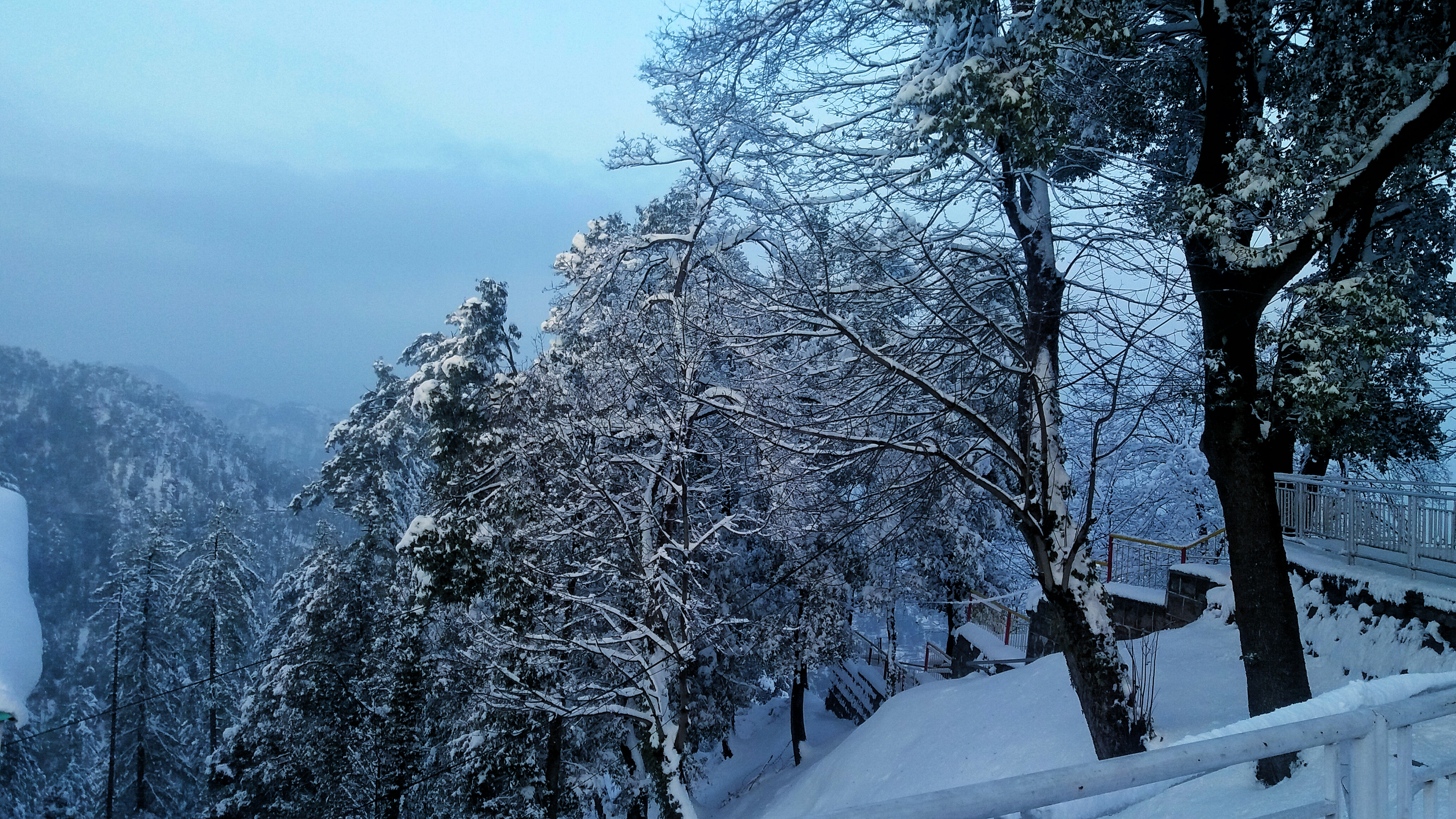
Punjab features mountainous terrain near the hill station of Murree.

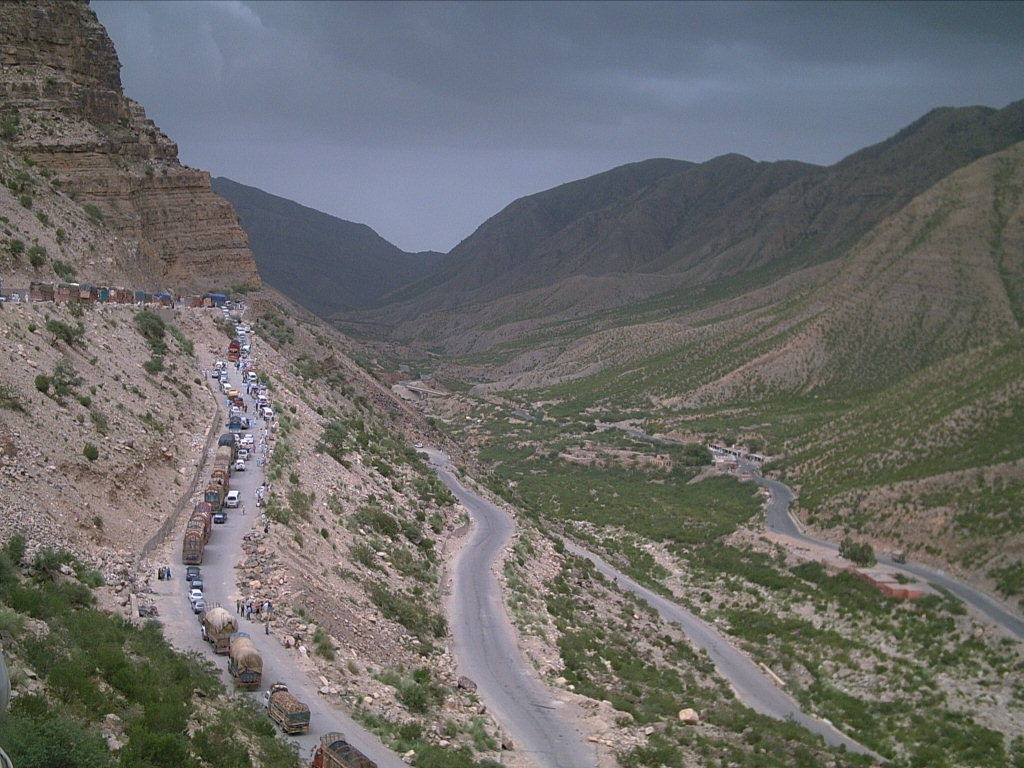
The route from Dera Ghazi Khan to Fort Munro

Punjab's landscape mostly consists of fertile alluvial plains of the Indus River and its four major tributaries in Pakistan: the Jhelum, Chenab, Ravi, and Sutlej rivers, which traverse Punjab north to south. The landscape is amongst the most heavily irrigated on earth and canals can be found throughout the province. Punjab also includes several mountainous regions, including the Sulaiman Mountains in the southwest part of the province, the Margalla Hills in the north near Islamabad, and the Salt Range which divides the most northerly portion of Punjab, the Pothohar Plateau, from the rest of the province. In south the elevation reaches 2,311 metres (7,582 ft) at the hill station of Suroh in Dera Ghazi Khan, which is also the highest peak in province. A portion of Thar desert lies in southern Punjab along the border with Indian state of Rajasthan, known as Cholistan. Another semi-arid desert lies in the Sind Sagar Doab called Thal.

=== Fauna ===
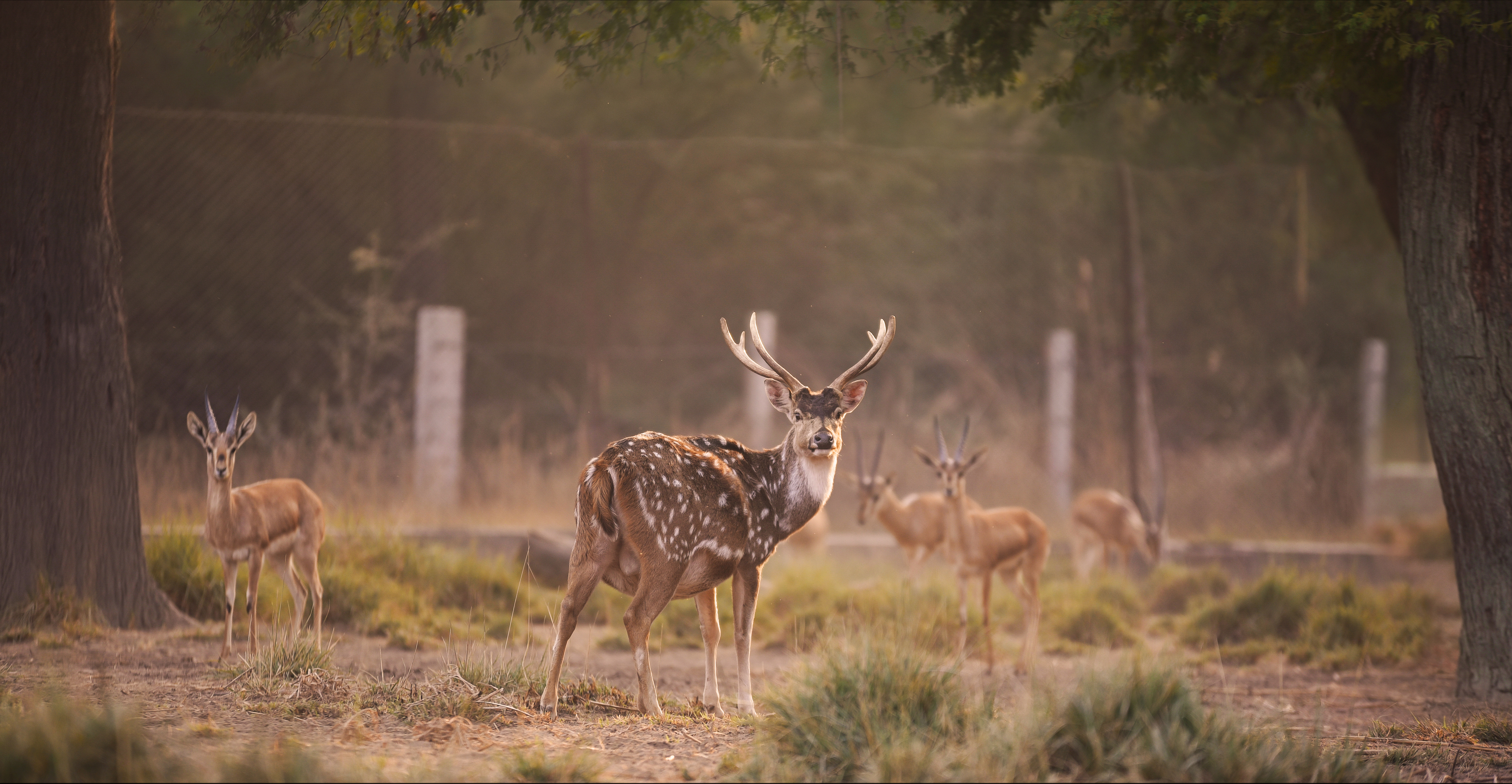
Chital (centre) and chinkaras (background) at Lal Suhanra National Park

Terrain of Punjab supports a wide range of fauna due to the variety of landscape present in the region, ranging from snowy hills to deserts. The mammal species in the province include leopard, barking deer, gray wolf, striped hyena, jackal, White-footed fox, chinkara, hog deer, rhesus macaque, and pangolin. The blackbuck, nilgai and chital have been successfully reintroduced at Lal Suhanra National Park. Punjab urial is the provincial animal, and is found only in the Salt Range and Kala Chitta Range of northern Punjab. Sulaiman markhor is also present in the southwestern Sulaiman Range. Reptilian species include mugger crocodile, gharial, monitor lizard, Russell's viper, Indian cobra, saw-scaled viper, wolf snake, John's sand boa, and spiny-tailed lizard. Indus river dolphin is the best known aquatic mammal endemic to the Indus River Basin in Punjab and Sindh. The avian species include Himalayan monal, Kalij pheasant, Koklass pheasant, grey partridge, grey francolin, common wood pigeon, houbara bustard, bulbul, common quail, pied cuckoo, parakeet, Sind woodpecker, great Indian bustard, black kite, Eurasian nightjar, steppe eagle, shikra, Eurasian griffon vulture, and peregrine falcon.

=== Climate ===
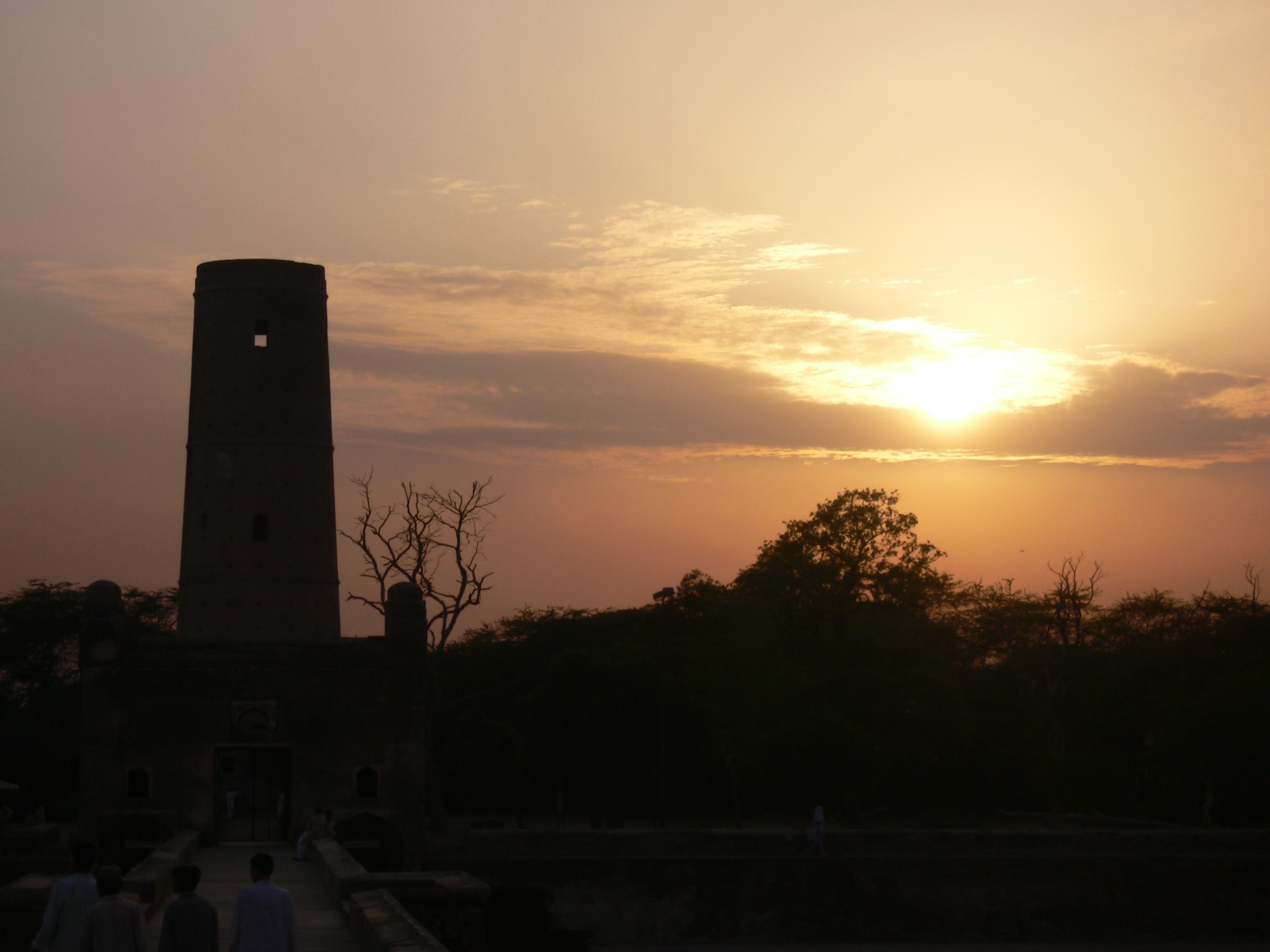
Sunset in Punjab, during summer

Most areas in Punjab experience extreme weather with foggy winters, often accompanied by rain. By mid-February the temperature begins to rise; springtime weather continues until mid-April, when the summer heat sets in. The onset of the southwest monsoon is anticipated to reach Punjab by May, but since the early 1970s, the weather pattern has been irregular. The spring monsoon has either skipped over the area or has caused it to rain so hard that floods have resulted. June and July are oppressively hot. Although official estimates rarely place the temperature above 46 °C, newspaper sources claim that it reaches 51 °C and regularly carry reports about people who have succumbed to the heat. Heat records were broken in Multan in June 1993, when the mercury was reported to have risen to 54 °C. In August the oppressive heat is punctuated by the rainy season, referred to as barsat, which brings relief in its wake. The hardest part of the summer is then over, but cooler weather does not come until late October.

In early 2007, the province experienced one of the coldest winters in the last 70 years.

Punjab's region temperature ranges from −2° to 45 °C, but can reach 50 °C (122 °F) in summer and can touch down to −10 °C in winter.

Climatically, Punjab has three major seasons:

- Hot weather (April to early June) when temperature rises as high as 123 °F (51 °C).
- Rainy season (late June to September). Average annual rainfall ranges between 950 and 1300 mm sub-mountain region and 500–800 mm in the plains.
- Cold / Foggy / mild weather (October to March). Temperature goes down as low as 35.6 °F (2.0 °C).

Weather extremes are notable from the hot and barren south to the cool hills of the north. The foothills of the Himalayas are found in the extreme north as well, and feature a much cooler and wetter climate, with snowfall common at higher altitudes.

== Demographics ==
Historical population figures (Note: 1941 figure taken from census data by combining the total population of all districts (Lahore, Sialkot, Gujranwala, Sheikhupura, Gujrat, Shahpur, Jhelum, Rawalpindi, Attock, Mianwali, Montgomery, Lyallpur, Jhang, Multan, Muzaffargargh, Dera Ghazi Khan), one tehsil (Shakargarh – then part of Gurdaspur District), one princely state (Bahawalpur), and one tract (Biloch Trans–Frontier) in Punjab Province, British India that ultimately fell on the western side of the Radcliffe Line. See 1941 census data here: Immediately following the partition of India in 1947, these districts and tract would ultimately make up the subdivision of West Punjab, which also later included Bahawalpur. The state that makes up this region in the contemporary era is Punjab, Pakistan.) (Note: 1931 figure taken from census data by combining the total population of all districts (Lahore, Sialkot, Gujranwala, Sheikhupura, Gujrat, Shahpur, Jhelum, Rawalpindi, Attock, Mianwali, Montgomery, Lyallpur, Jhang, Multan, Muzaffargargh, Dera Ghazi Khan), one tehsil (Shakargarh – then part of Gurdaspur District), one princely state (Bahawalpur), and one tract (Biloch Trans–Frontier) in Punjab Province, British India that ultimately fell on the western side of the Radcliffe Line. See 1931 census data here: Immediately following the partition of India in 1947, these districts and tract would ultimately make up the subdivision of West Punjab, which also later included Bahawalpur. The state that makes up this region in the contemporary era is Punjab, Pakistan.) (Note: 1921 figure taken from census data by combining the total population of all districts (Lahore, Sialkot, Gujranwala, Sheikhupura, Gujrat, Shahpur, Jhelum, Rawalpindi, Attock, Mianwali, Montgomery, Lyallpur, Jhang, Multan, Muzaffargargh, Dera Ghazi Khan), one tehsil (Shakargarh – then part of Gurdaspur District), one princely state (Bahawalpur), and one tract (Biloch Trans–Frontier) in Punjab Province, British India that ultimately fell on the western side of the Radcliffe Line. See 1921 census data here: Immediately following the partition of India in 1947, these districts and tract would ultimately make up the subdivision of West Punjab, which also later included Bahawalpur. The state that makes up this region in the contemporary era is Punjab, Pakistan.) (Note: 1911 figure taken from census data by combining the total population of all districts (Lahore, Sialkot, Gujranwala, Gujrat, Shahpur, Jhelum, Rawalpindi, Attock, Mianwali, Montgomery, Lyallpur, Jhang, Multan, Muzaffargargh, Dera Ghazi Khan), one tehsil (Shakargarh – then part of Gurdaspur District), one princely state (Bahawalpur), and one tract (Biloch Trans–Frontier) in Punjab Province, British India that ultimately fell on the western side of the Radcliffe Line. See 1911 census data here: Immediately following the partition of India in 1947, these districts and tract would ultimately make up the subdivision of West Punjab, which also later included Bahawalpur. The state that makes up this region in the contemporary era is Punjab, Pakistan.) (Note: 1901 figure taken from census data by combining the total population of all districts (Lahore, Sialkot, Gujranwala, Gujrat, Shahpur, Jhelum, Rawalpindi, Mianwali, Montgomery, Lyallpur (inscribed as the Chenab Colony on the 1901 census), Jhang, Multan, Muzaffargargh, Dera Ghazi Khan), one tehsil (Shakargarh – then part of Gurdaspur District), one princely state (Bahawalpur), and one tract (Biloch Trans–Frontier) in Punjab Province, British India that ultimately fell on the western side of the Radcliffe Line. See 1901 census data here: Immediately following the partition of India in 1947, these districts and tract would ultimately make up the subdivision of West Punjab, which also later included Bahawalpur. The state that makes up this region in the contemporary era is Punjab, Pakistan.) (Note: 1891 figure taken from census data by combining the total population of all districts (Lahore, Sialkot, Gujranwala, Gujrat, Shahpur, Jhelum, Rawalpindi, Montgomery, Jhang, Multan, Muzaffargargh, Dera Ghazi Khan), one tehsil (Shakargarh – then part of Gurdaspur District), one princely state (Bahawalpur), and one tract (Biloch Trans–Frontier) in Punjab Province, British India that ultimately fell on the western side of the Radcliffe Line. See 1891 census data here: Immediately following the partition of India in 1947, these districts and tract would ultimately make up the subdivision of West Punjab, which also later included Bahawalpur. The state that makes up this region in the contemporary era is Punjab, Pakistan.) (Note: 1881 figure taken from census data by combining the total population of all districts (Lahore, Sialkot, Gujranwala, Gujrat, Shahpur, Jhelum, Rawalpindi, Montgomery, Jhang, Multan, Muzaffargargh, Dera Ghazi Khan), one tehsil (Shakargarh – then part of Gurdaspur District), and one princely state (Bahawalpur) in Punjab Province, British India that ultimately fell on the western side of the Radcliffe Line. See 1881 census data here: Immediately following the partition of India in 1947, these districts and tract would ultimately make up the subdivision of West Punjab, which also later included Bahawalpur. The state that makes up this region in the contemporary era is Punjab, Pakistan.)
Census	Population	Urban	Rural
1881	7,942,399	881,955	7,060,444
1891	8,895,342	893,610	8,001,732
1901	10,427,765	994,626	9,433,139
1911	11,104,585	1,012,324	10,092,261
1921	11,888,985	1,179,439	10,709,546
1931	14,040,798	1,714,641	12,326,157
1941	17,350,103	2,591,313	14,758,790
1951	20,540,762	3,568,076	16,972,686
1961	25,463,974	5,475,922	19,988,052
1972	37,607,423	9,182,695	28,424,728
1981	47,292,441	13,051,646	34,240,795
1998	73,621,290	23,019,025	50,602,265
2017	110,012,615	40,401,164	70,008,451
2023	127,688,922	51,975,967	75,712,955

=== Population ===
The province is home to over half the population of Pakistan, and is the world's second-most populous subnational entity, and the most populous outside of India and China. The capital and largest city is Lahore which has been the capital of the wider Punjab region since 16th-century. Other important cities include Faisalabad, Rawalpindi, Gujranwala, Sargodha, Multan, Sialkot, Bahawalpur, Gujrat, Sheikhupura, Jhelum, Rahim Yar Khan and Sahiwal.

As per a 2025 Dawn News report, based on data compiled by research organisation Population Council, UK Aid and the United Nations Population, Pakistan's Punjab had an annual growth rate of 2.53%. According to demographic projections, if the province’s current total fertility rate of 3.4 children per woman remains unchanged, Punjab’s population could more than double to approximately 253 million by 2050.

=== Languages ===
Languages of Punjab, Pakistan
(2023 Census)
1. Punjabi (67.0%)
2. Saraiki (20.6%)
3. Urdu (7.18%)
4. Pashto (1.87%)
5. Balochi (0.83%)
6. Mewati (0.81%)
7. Hindko (0.60%)
8. Others (1.02%)

The major native language spoken in Punjab is Punjabi, representing the largest language spoken in the country. The Punjabi language is spoken in the form of many dialects across the province, including Majhi, Pothwari, Thali, Jhangvi, Dhanni, Shahpuri, and Doabi. In addition to Punjabi, other closely related languages such as Saraiki in the south (including Multani, Derawali, and Riasti dialects) and Hindko in the northwest (including Chachhi, Ghebi, and Awankari dialects) are also spoken widely. Both Saraiki and Hindko have been enumerated separately from Punjabi in the Pakistani censuses of 1981 and 2017.

=== Religions ===
Religion in Punjab (2023 Census)
Religion	Percent
Islam	97.75%
Christianity	1.93%
Hinduism	0.19%
Others	0.13%

According to the 2023 census, the population of Punjab, Pakistan was 127,688,922. With 124,462,897 adherents, Muslims comprise the largest religious group, with a Sunni Hanafi majority and a Shia Ithna 'ashariyah minority, forming approximately 97.75 per cent of the population. As of 2026, there were more than 80,000 mosques in the province. The largest non-Muslim minority is Christians with 2,458,924 adherents, forming roughly 1.93 per cent of the population. Hindus form 249,716 people, comprising approximately 0.20 per cent of the population. The other minorities include Sikhs and Parsis.

Religion in Punjab, Pakistan (1881–2023)
Religious group	1881		1891		1901		1911		1921		1931		1941		1951		1998		2017		2023	
Religious group	Pop.	%	Pop.	%	Pop.	%	Pop.	%	Pop.	%	Pop.	%	Pop.	%	Pop.	%	Pop.	%	Pop.	%	Pop.	%
Islam	6,201,859	78.09%	6,766,545	76.07%	7,951,155	76.25%	8,494,314	76.49%	8,975,288	75.49%	10,570,029	75.28%	13,022,160	75.06%	20,200,794	97.89%	71,574,830	97.22%	107,541,602	97.77%	124,462,897	97.75%
Christianity	12,992	0.16%	30,168	0.34%	42,371	0.41%	144,514	1.3%	247,030	2.08%	324,730	2.31%	395,311	2.28%	402,617	1.95%	1,699,843	2.31%	2,063,063	1.88%	2,458,924	1.93%
Hinduism (Note: 1931–1941 census: Including Ad-Dharmis)	1,449,913	18.26%	1,727,810	19.42%	1,944,363	18.65%	1,645,758	14.82%	1,797,141	15.12%	1,957,878	13.94%	2,373,466	13.68%	33,052	0.16%	116,410	0.16%	211,641	0.19%	249,716	0.2%
Sikhism	272,908	3.44%	366,162	4.12%	483,999	4.64%	813,441	7.33%	863,091	7.26%	1,180,789	8.41%	1,530,112	8.82%	—N/a	—N/a	—N/a	—N/a	—N/a	—N/a	5,649	0.004%
Jainism	4,352	0.05%	4,408	0.05%	5,562	0.05%	5,977	0.05%	5,930	0.05%	6,921	0.05%	9,520	0.05%	—N/a	—N/a	—N/a	—N/a	—N/a	—N/a	—N/a	—N/a
Zoroastrianism	354	0.004%	215	0.002%	300	0.003%	377	0.003%	309	0.003%	413	0.003%	312	0.002%	195	0.001%	—N/a	—N/a	—N/a	—N/a	358	0.0003%
Buddhism	0	0%	0	0%	6	0.0001%	168	0.002%	172	0.001%	32	0.0002%	87	0.001%	9	0%	—N/a	—N/a	—N/a	—N/a	—N/a	—N/a
Judaism	—N/a	—N/a	17	0.0002%	9	0.0001%	36	0.0003%	16	0.0001%	6	0%	7	0%	—N/a	—N/a	—N/a	—N/a	—N/a	—N/a	—N/a	—N/a
Ahmadiyya	—N/a	—N/a	—N/a	—N/a	—N/a	—N/a	—N/a	—N/a	—N/a	—N/a	—N/a	—N/a	—N/a	—N/a	—N/a	—N/a	181,428	0.25%	158,021	0.14%	140,512	0.11%
Others	21	0.0003%	17	0.0002%	0	0%	0	0%	8	0.0001%	0	0%	19,534	0.11%	35	0.0002%	48,779	0.07%	15,328	0.01%	15,249	0.01%
Total responses	7,942,399	100%	8,895,342	100%	10,427,765	100%	11,104,585	100%	11,888,985	100%	14,040,798	100%	17,350,103	100%	20,636,702	99.93%	73,621,290	100%	109,989,655	100%	127,333,305	99.72%
Total population	7,942,399	100%	8,895,342	100%	10,427,765	100%	11,104,585	100%	11,888,985	100%	14,040,798	100%	17,350,103	100%	20,651,140	100%	73,621,290	100%	109,989,655	100%	127,688,922	100%

== Government and administration ==
Punjab assembly, Lahore

The Government of Punjab is a provincial government in the federal structure of Pakistan, is based in Lahore, the capital of the Punjab Province. The Chief Minister of Punjab (CM) is elected by the Provincial Assembly of the Punjab to serve as the head of the provincial government in Punjab, Pakistan. The current Chief Minister is Maryam Nawaz Sharif, who is also the first ever woman Chief Minister of any province in Pakistan. The Provincial Assembly of the Punjab is a unicameral legislature of elected representatives of the province of Punjab, which is located in Lahore in eastern Pakistan. The Assembly was established under Article 106 of the Constitution of Pakistan as having a total of 371 seats, with 66 seats reserved for women and eight reserved for non-Muslims.

There are 48 departments in Punjab government. Each Department is headed by a Provincial Minister (Politician) and a Provincial Secretary (A civil servant of usually BPS-20 or BPS-21). All Ministers report to the Chief Minister, who is the Chief Executive. All Secretaries report to the Chief Secretary of Punjab, who is usually a BPS-22 Civil Servant. The Chief Secretary in turn, reports to the Chief Minister. In addition to these departments, there are several Autonomous Bodies and Attached Departments that report directly to either the Secretaries or the Chief Secretary.

The province is represented in the federal parliament through 173, out of 336, seats in National Assembly, the lower house; and 23, out of 96, seats in Senate, the upper house.

=== Divisions ===
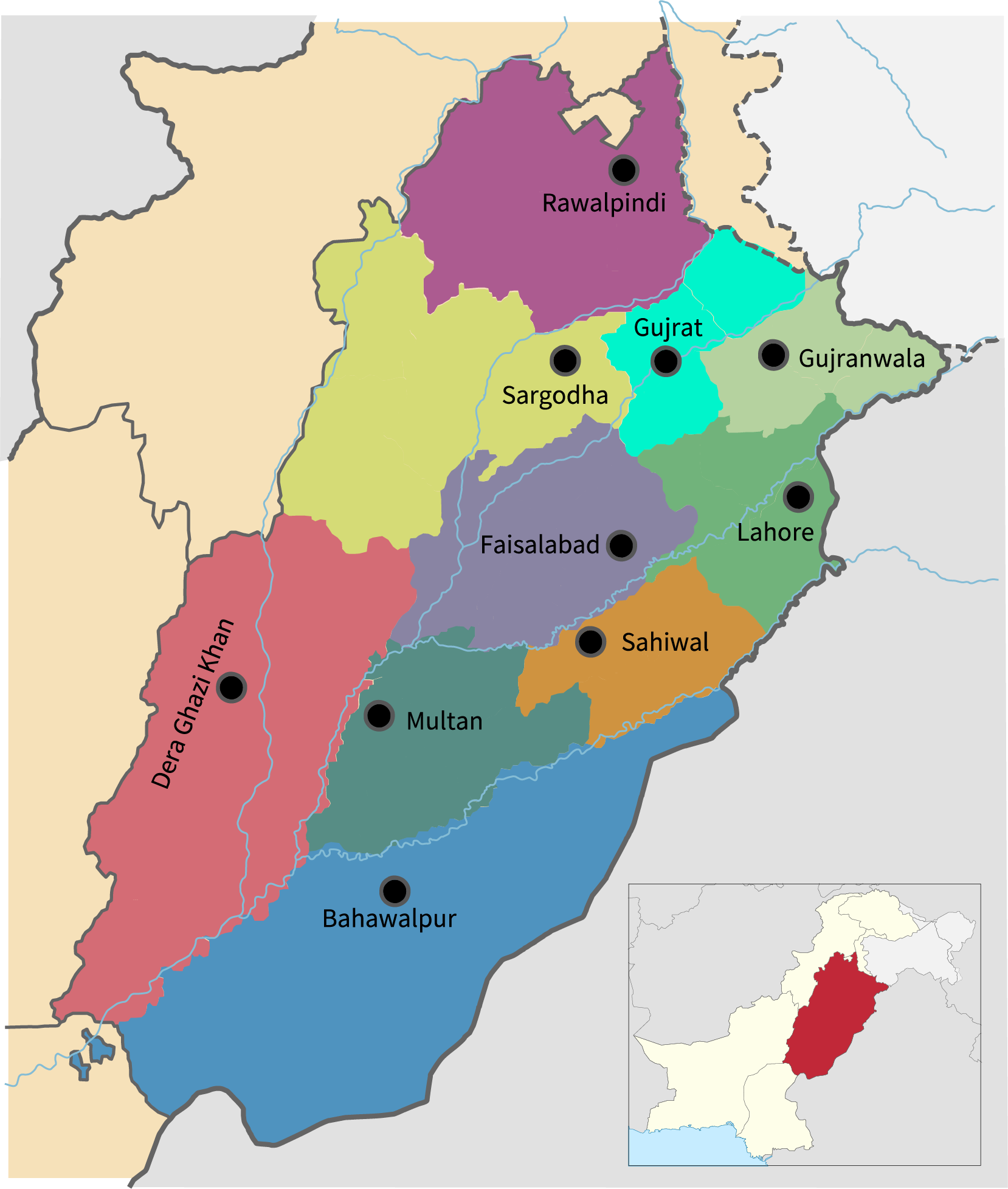
Map of the Pakistani Punjab Divisions

Division	Population (2023)	Population (2017)	Population (1998)	Population (1981)	Population (1972)	Population (1961)	Population (1951)
Lahore	22,772,710	19,581,281	8,694,620	–	–	–	–
Faisalabad	16,228,526	14,177,081	9,885,685	–	–	–	–
Multan	14,085,102	12,265,161	8,447,557	–	–	–	–
Bahawalpur	13,400,009	11,464,031	7,635,591	–	–	–	–
Dera Ghazi Khan	12,892,465	11,014,398	6,503,590	–	–	–	–
Gujranwala	11,416,686	9,783,183	6,101,052	3,934,861	3,218,873	2,587,061	1,835,178
Rawalpindi	10,804,250	10,007,821	6,659,528	–	–	–	–
Sargodha	9,591,275	8,181,499	5,679,766	–	–	–	–
Sahiwal	8,533,471	7,380,386	5,362,866	–	–	–	–
Gujrat	7,362,182	6,340,801	5,330,006	–	–	–	–

=== Districts ===
Below you will find a list of all 41 districts in the province of Punjab, along with the division it belongs to, the area of the district, the population and population density of the district, the average annual population growth rate of each district (between 1998 and 2017), and a map showing its location. The districts are initially listed in alphabetical order, but they can be sorted in different ways by clicking the headers of the table.

List of the Districts by area, population, density, literacy rate etc.
District	Headquarter	Area (km^{2})	Population (2023)	Density (ppp/km^{2})	Literacy rate (2023)	Average Annual Population Growth Rate (1998 - 2017)	Map	Division
Attock	Attock	6,858	2,170,423	316.7	80.22%	2.08% ▲		Rawalpindi
Bahawalnagar	Bahawalnagar	8,878	3,550,342	399.6	67.01%	1.95% ▲		Bahawalpur
Bahawalpur	Bahawalpur	24,830	4,284,964	172.3	63.35%	2.18% ▲		Bahawalpur
Bhakkar	Bhakkar	8,153	1,957,470	240.5	65.68%	2.39% ▲		Sargodha
Chakwal	Chakwal	6,524	1,734,854	266.2	87.79%	1.71% ▲		Rawalpindi
Chiniot	Chiniot	2,643	1,563,024	591.3	65.05%	1.85% ▲		Faisalabad
Dera Ghazi Khan	Dera Ghazi Khan	11,922	3,393,705	285.8	56.78%	2.98% ▲		Dera Ghazi Khan
Faisalabad	Faisalabad	5,856	9,075,819	1,551.7	83.41%	1.98% ▲		Faisalabad
Gujranwala	Gujranwala	2,426	4,966,338	2,045.4	86.77%	2.06% ▲		Gujranwala
Gujrat	Gujrat	3,192	3,219,375	1,007.0	91.37%	1.57% ▲		Gujrat
Hafizabad	Hafizabad	2,367	1,319,909	557.0	75.77%	1.74% ▲		Gujrat
Jhang	Jhang	6,166	3,065,639	497.6	69.45%	2.03% ▲		Faisalabad
Jhelum	Jhelum	3,587	1,382,308	385.7	90.65%	1.41% ▲		Rawalpindi
Kasur	Kasur	3,995	4,084,286	1,021.4	72.85%	2.03% ▲		Lahore
Khanewal	Khanewal	4,349	3,364,077	774.3	70.97%	1.83% ▲		Multan
Khushab	Jauharabad	6,511	1,501,089	230.8	72.52%	1.84% ▲		Sargodha
Lahore	Lahore	1,772	13,004,135	7,336.6	89.62%	3.00% ▲		Lahore
Layyah	Layyah	6,289	2,102,386	334.5	71.83%	2.59% ▲		Dera Ghazi Khan
Lodhran	Lodhran	2,778	1,928,299	693.5	61.68%	1.97% ▲		Multan
Mandi Bahauddin	Mandi Bahauddin	2,673	1,829,486	683.1	80.27%	1.68% ▲		Gujrat
Mianwali	Mianwali	5,840	1,798,268	307.4	72.87%	2.01% ▲		Sargodha
Multan	Multan	3,720	5,362,305	1,441.1	71.41%	2.23% ▲		Multan
Muzaffargarh	Muzaffargarh	4,778	3,528,567	738.50	43.74%	...		Dera Ghazi Khan
Nankana Sahib	Nankana Sahib	2,216	1,634,871	737.0	73.12%	1.37% ▲		Lahore
Narowal	Narowal	2,337	1,950,954	834.3	85.28%	1.59% ▲		Gujranwala
Okara	Okara	4,377	3,515,490	802.2	70.25%	1.64% ▲		Sahiwal
Pakpattan	Pakpattan	2,724	2,136,170	785.3	67.13%	1.85% ▲		Sahiwal
Rahim Yar Khan	Rahim Yar Khan	11,880	5,564,703	468.2	57.94%	2.26% ▲		Bahawalpur
Rajanpur	Rajanpur	12,319	2,381,049	193.3	46.09%	3.16% ▲		Dera Ghazi Khan
Rawalpindi	Rawalpindi	4,547	5,745,964	1,868.79	93.22%	2.52% ▲		Rawalpindi
Sahiwal	Sahiwal	3,201	2,881,811	900.6	74.77%	1.64% ▲		Sahiwal
Sargodha	Sargodha	5,854	4,334,448	740.1	76.73%	1.73% ▲		Sargodha
Sheikhupura	Sheikhupura	3,744	4,049,418	1,080.3	78.88%	2.22% ▲		Lahore
Sialkot	Sialkot	3,016	4,499,394	1,492.5	88.37%	1.90% ▲		Gujranwala
Toba Tek Singh	Toba Tek Singh	3,252	2,524,044	776.2	81.38%	1.59% ▲		Faisalabad
Vehari	Vehari	4,364	3,430,421	787.7	69.10%	1.74% ▲		Multan
Talagang	Talagang	2,932	602,246	226.33	75.50	1.90% ▲		Rawalpindi
Murree	Murree	738	372,947	480	84.79	...		Rawalpindi
Taunsa	Taunsa	8,108	...	...	57.96	...		Dera Ghazi Khan
Kot Addu	Kot Addu	3,471	1,486,758	428.34	58.19	...		Dera Ghazi Khan
Wazirabad	Wazirabad	1,206	993,412	690	77.39	...		Gujrat

== Major cities ==
List of major cities in Punjab
Rank	City	District	Population	Image
1	Lahore	Lahore	11,126,285	
2	Faisalabad	Faisalabad	3,204,726	
3	Rawalpindi	Rawalpindi	2,098,231	
4	Gujranwala	Gujranwala	2,027,001	
5	Multan	Multan	1,871,843	
6	Bahawalpur	Bahawalpur	762,111	
7	Sargodha	Sargodha	659,862	
8	Sialkot	Sialkot	655,852	
9	Sheikhupura	Sheikhupura	473,129	
10	Rahim Yar Khan	Rahim Yar Khan	420,419	
11	Jhang	Jhang	414,131	
12	Dera Ghazi Khan	Dera Ghazi Khan	399,064	
13	Gujrat	Gujrat	390,533	
14	Sahiwal	Sahiwal	389,605	
15	Wah Cantonment	Rawalpindi	380,103	
Source: pbscensus 2017
This is a list of city proper populations and does not indicate metro populations.

== Economy ==
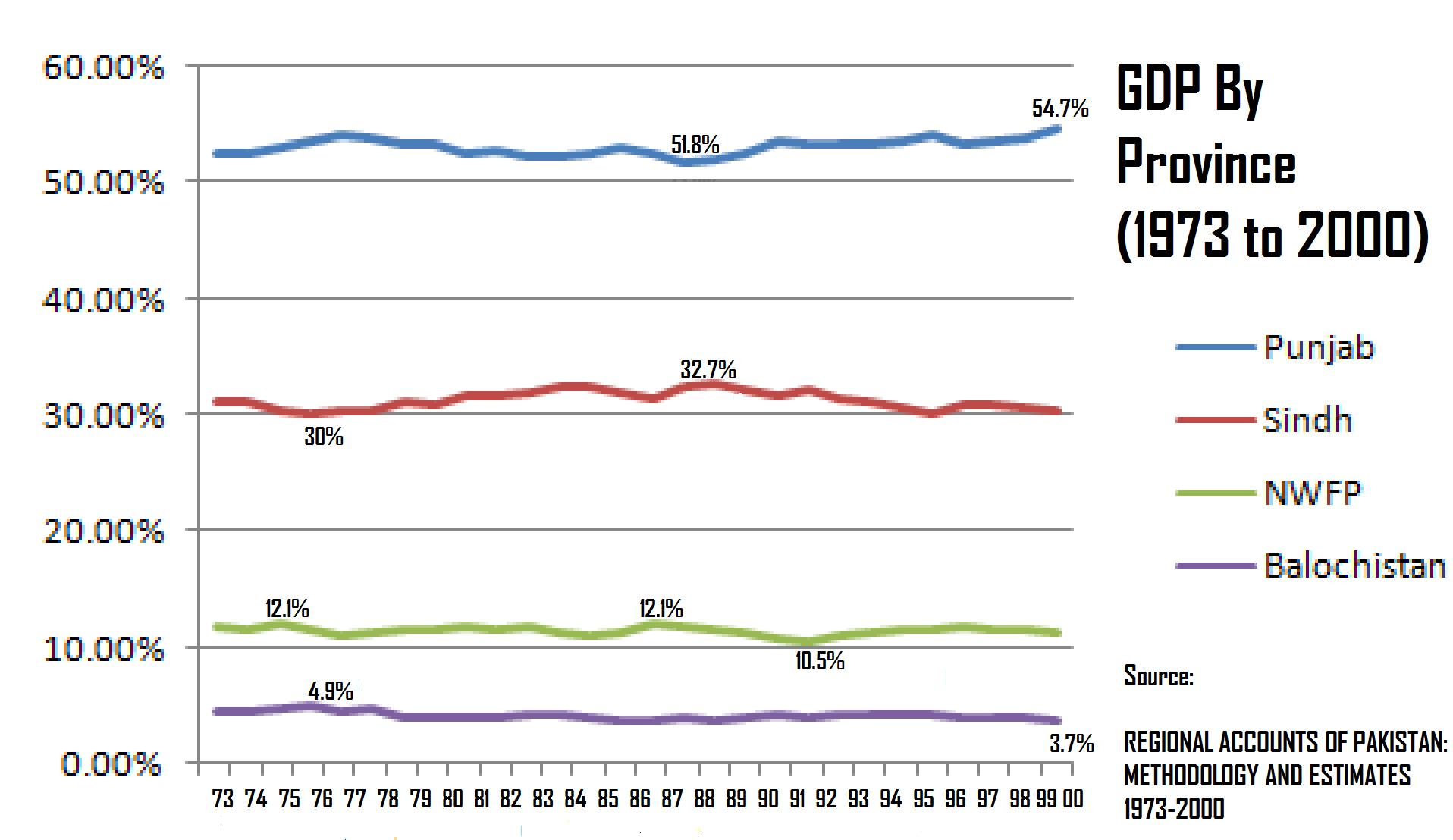
GDP by Province

The industrial sector comprising 24 per cent of the province's gross domestic product. Punjab has the largest economy in Pakistan, contributing most to the national GDP. The province's economy has quadrupled since 1972. Its share of Pakistan's GDP was 54.7% in 2000 and 59% as of 2010. It is especially dominant in the service and agriculture sectors of Pakistan's economy. With its contribution ranging from 52.1% to 64.5% in the Service Sector and 56.1% to 61.5% in the agriculture sector. It is also a major manpower contributor because it has the largest pool of professionals and highly skilled (technically trained) manpower in Pakistan. It is also dominant in the manufacturing sector, though the dominance is not as huge, with historical contributions ranging from a low of 44% to a high of 52.6%. In 2007, Punjab achieved a growth rate of 7.8% and during the period 2002–03 to 2007–08, its economy grew at a rate of between 7% and 8% per year. and during 2008–09 grew at 6% against the total GDP growth of Pakistan at 4%.

It is known for its relative prosperity, and has the lowest rate of poverty among all Pakistani provinces. (Note: Islamabad Capital Territory is Pakistan's least impoverished administrative unit, but ICT is not a province. Azad Kashmir also has a rate of poverty lower than Punjab, but is not a province.) However, a clear divide is present between the northern and southern regions of the province; with northern Punjab being relatively more developed than southern Punjab.

Despite the lack of a coastline, Punjab is the most industrialised province of Pakistan; its manufacturing industries produce textiles, sports goods, heavy machinery, electrical appliances, surgical instruments, vehicles, auto parts, metals, sugar mill plants, aircraft, cement, agricultural machinery, bicycles and rickshaws, floor coverings, and processed foods. In 2003, the province manufactured 90% of the paper and paper boards, 71% of the fertilisers, 69% of the sugar and 40% of the cement of Pakistan.

Industrial Zones Punjab, Source:

Lahore and Gujranwala Divisions have the largest concentration of small light engineering units. The district of Sialkot excels in sports goods, surgical instruments and cutlery goods. Industrial estates are being developed by Punjab government to boost industrialisation in province, Quaid e Azam Business Park Sheikhupura is one of the industrial areas which is being developed near Sheikhupura on Lahore-Islamabad motorway.

Punjab has the lowest poverty rates in Pakistan, although a divide is present between the northern and southern parts of the province. Sialkot District in the prosperous northern part of the province has a poverty rate of 5.63%, while Rajanpur District in the poorer south has a poverty rate of 60.05%.

== Education ==
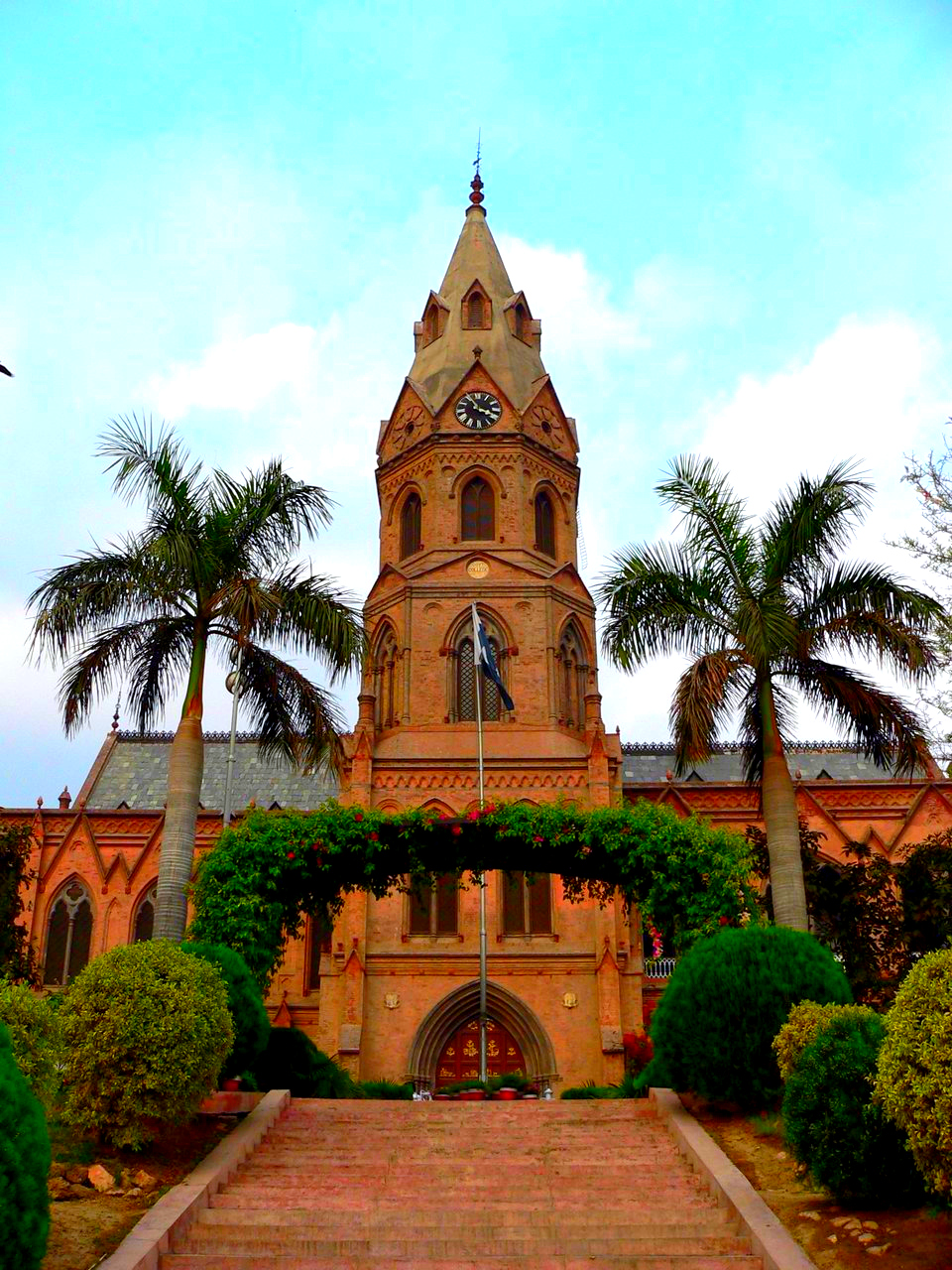
Government College University, Lahore

The literacy rate has increased greatly over the last 40 years (see the table below). Punjab has the highest Human Development Index out of all of Pakistan's provinces at 0.550.

Literacy rate
Year	Literacy rate
1972	20.7%
1981	27.4%
1998	46.56%
2009	59.6%
2021	66.3%

== Culture ==
The culture in Punjab grew out of the settlements along the five rivers, which served as an important route to the Near East as early as the ancient Indus Valley civilisation, dating back to 3000 BCE. Agriculture has been the major economic feature of the Punjab and has therefore formed the foundation of Punjabi culture, with one's social status being determined by landownership. Punjab emerged as an important agricultural region, especially following the Green Revolution during the mid-1960s to the mid-1970s, has been described as the "breadbasket of both India and Pakistan".

=== Fairs and festivals ===
The Islamic festivals are typically observed. Non-Islamic festivals include Lohri, Basant and Vaisakhi, which are usually celebrated as seasonal festivals. The Islamic festivals are set according to the lunar Islamic calendar (Hijri), and the date falls earlier by 10 to 13 days from year to year.

Some Islamic clerics and some politicians have attempted to ban the participation of non-Islamic festivals because of the religious basis, and they being declared haram (forbidden in Islam).

== Tourism ==
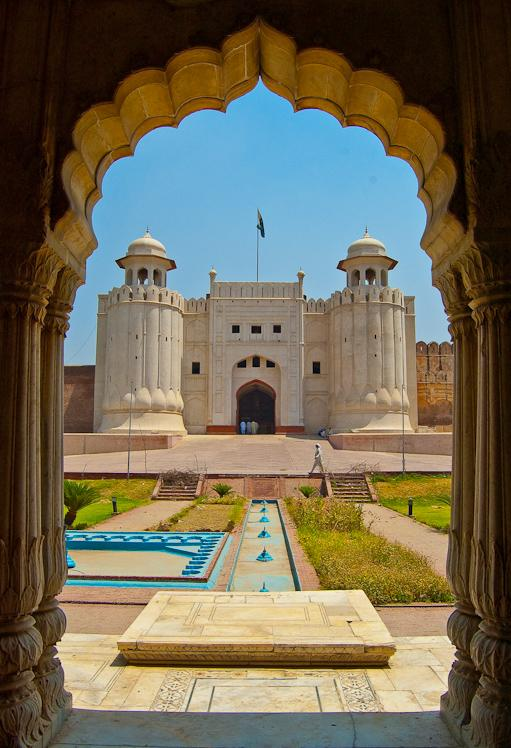
The Lahore Fort, a landmark built during the Mughal era, is a UNESCO World Heritage Site

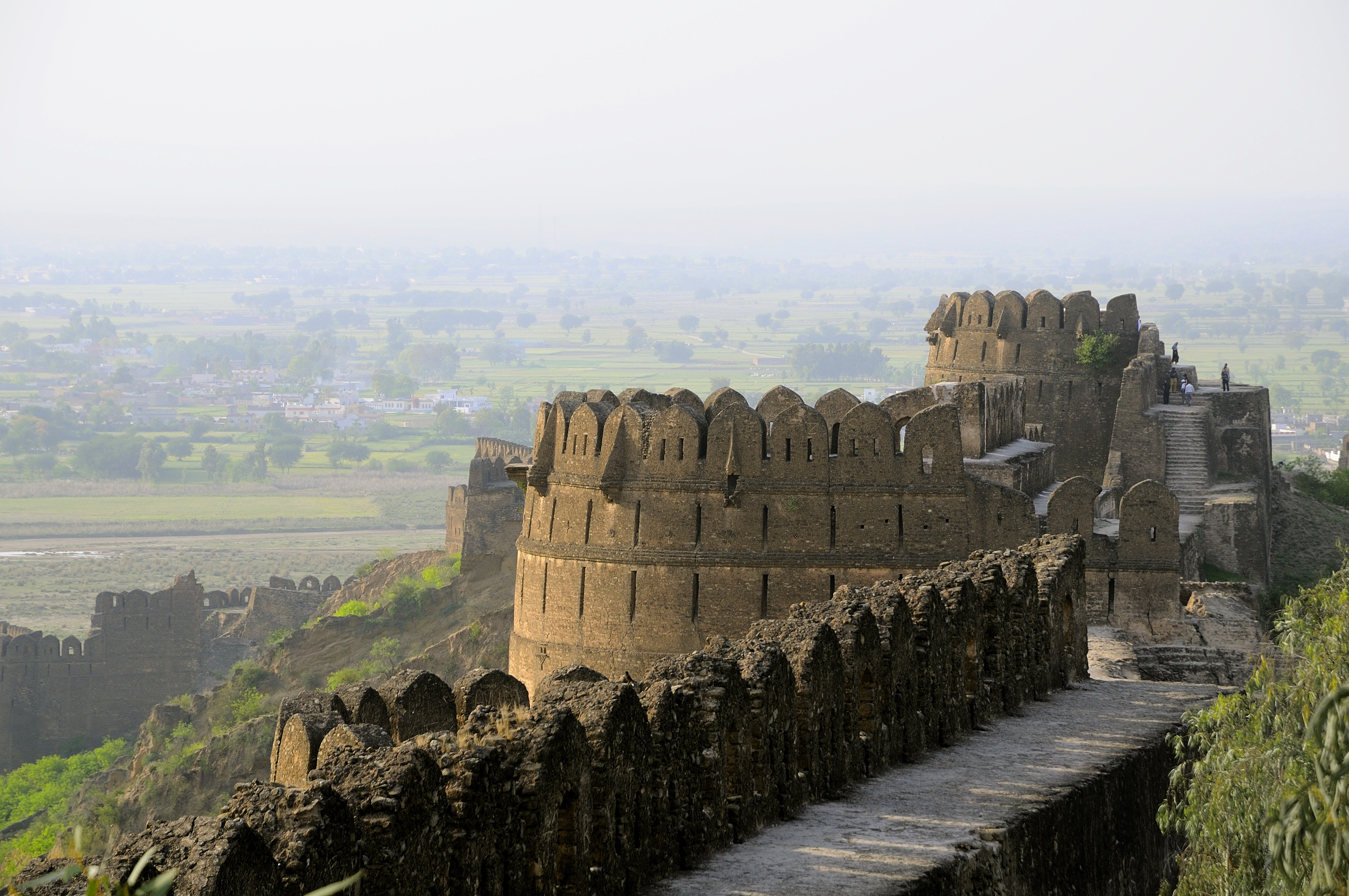
Rohtas Fort, a UNESCO World Heritage Site, was built upon a hill overlooking the Pothohar Plateau.

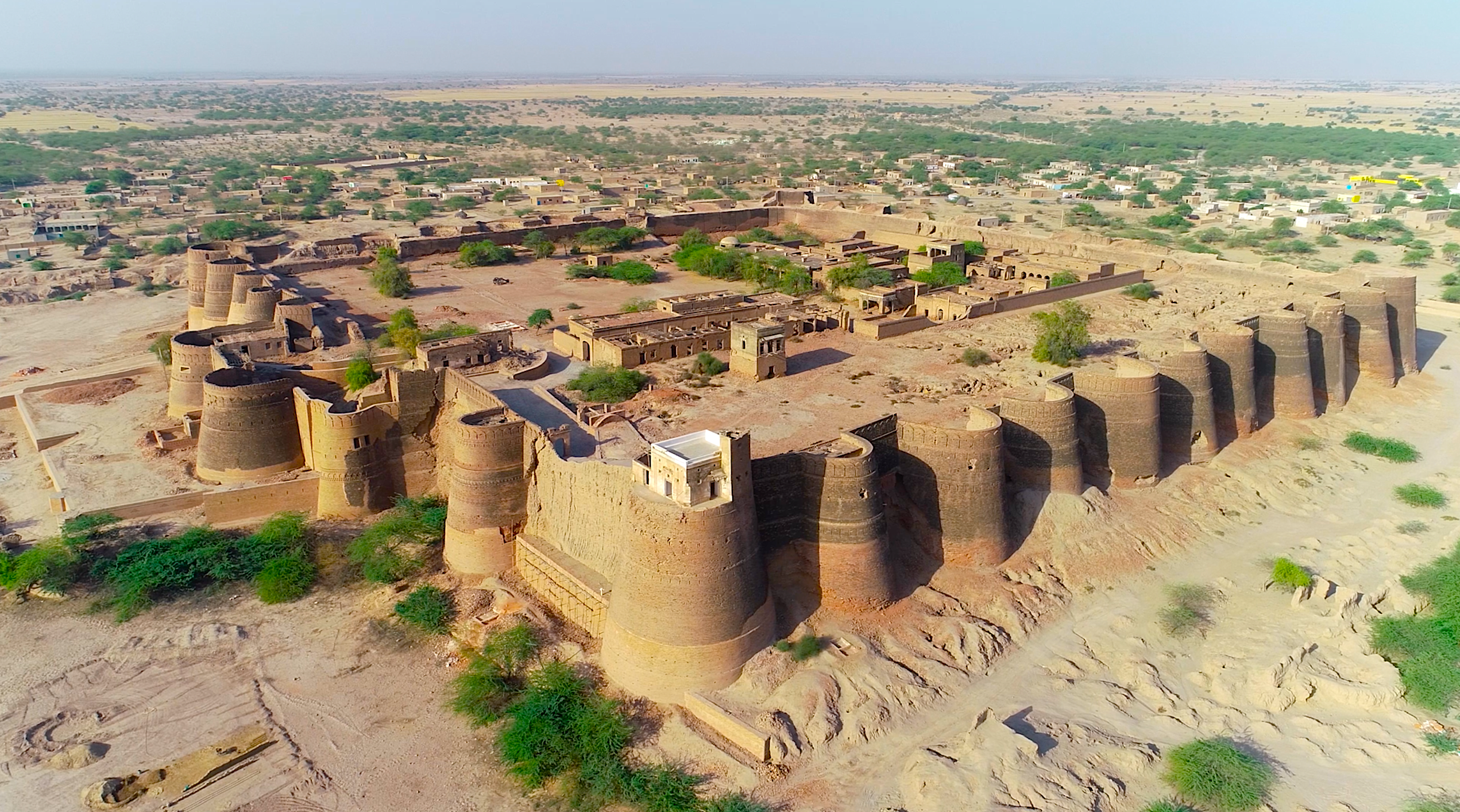
Derawar Fort, a medieval era fort in the Cholistan Desert

Tourism in Punjab is regulated by the Tourism Development Corporation of Punjab. The province has a number of large cosmopolitan cities, including the provincial capital Lahore. Major visitor attractions there include Lahore Fort and Shalimar Gardens, which are now recognised World Heritage Sites. The Walled City of Lahore, Badshahi Mosque, Wazir Khan Mosque, Tomb of Jahangir and Nur Jahan, Tomb of Asaf Khan, Chauburji and other major sites are visited by tourists each year.

Murree is a famous hill station stop for tourists. The Pharwala Fort, which was built by an ancient Hindu civilisation, is on the outskirts of the city. The city of Sheikhupura also has a number of sites from the Mughal Empire, including the World Heritage-listed Rohtas Fort near Jhelum. The Katasraj temple in the city of Chakwal is a major destination for Hindu devotees. The Khewra Salt Mines is one of the oldest mines in South Asia. Faisalabad's clock tower and eight bazaars were designed to represent the Union Jack.

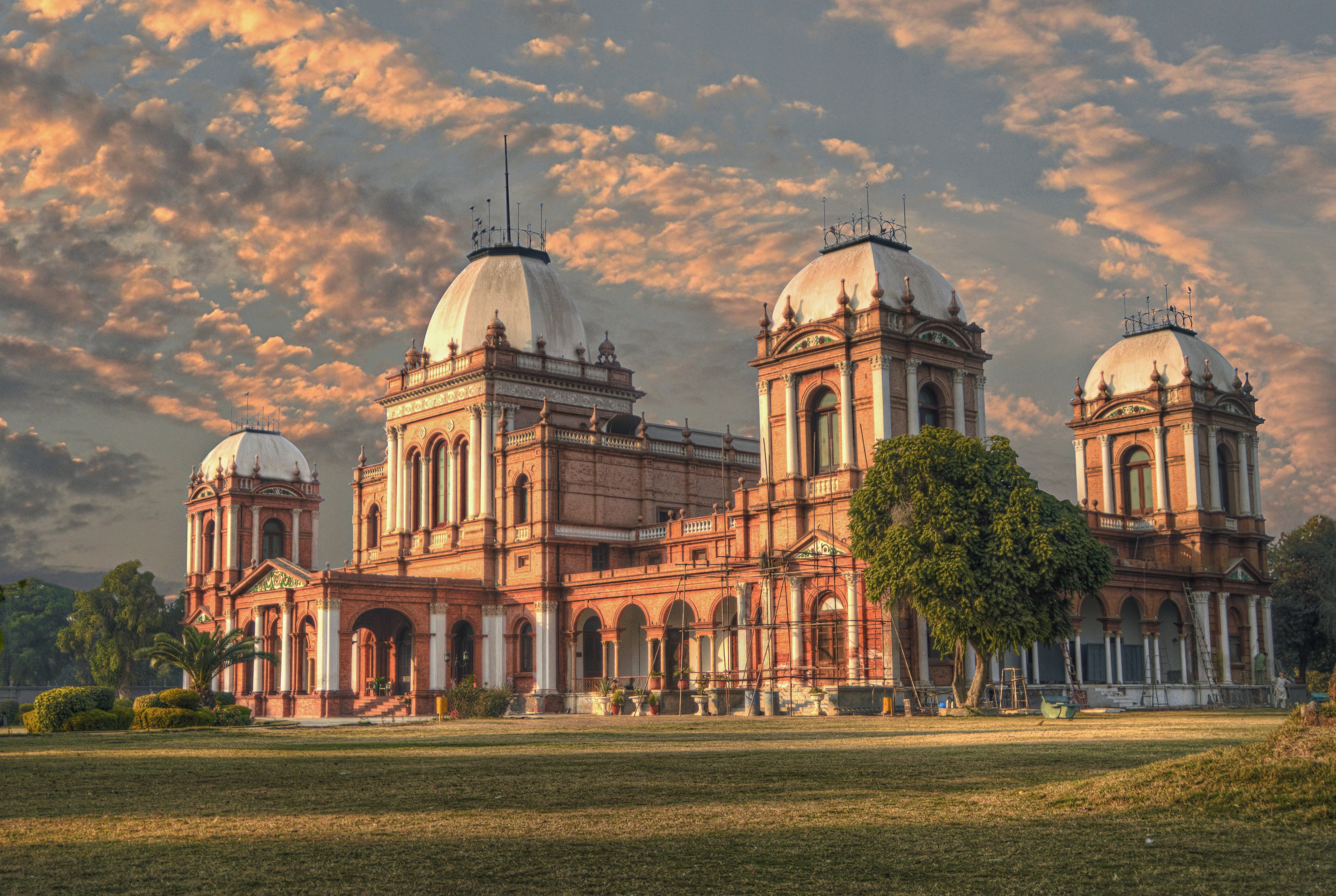
Noor Mahal, Bahawalpur

The province's southward is arid. Multan is known for its mausoleums of saints and Sufi pirs. The Multan Museum, Multan fort, DHA 360° zoo and Nuagaza tombs are significant attractions in the city. The city of Bahawalpur is located near the Cholistan and Thar deserts. Derawar Fort in the Cholistan Desert is the site for the annual Cholistan Jeep Rally. The city is also near the ancient site of Uch Sharif which was once a Delhi Sultanate stronghold. The Noor Mahal, Sadiq Ghar Palace, and Darbar Mall were built during the reign of the Nawabs. The Lal Suhanra National Park is a major zoological garden on the outskirts of the city.

== Social issues ==
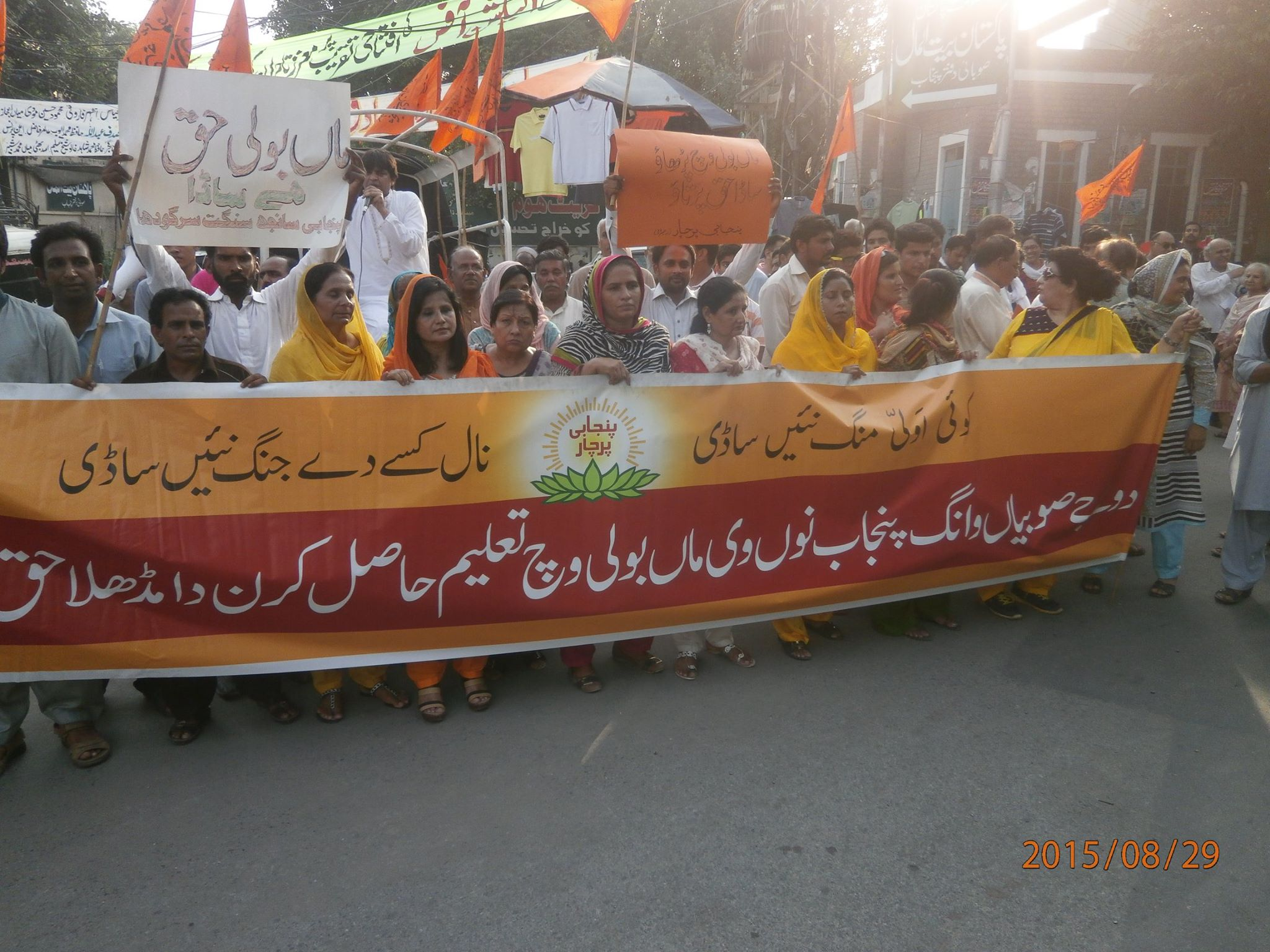
A demonstration by Punjabis at Lahore, Pakistan, demanding to make Punjabi as official language of instruction in schools of the Punjab.

The use of Urdu and English as the near exclusive languages of broadcasting, the public sector, and formal education have led some to fear that the Punjabi language in the province is being relegated to a low-status language and that it is being denied an environment where it can flourish.

In August 2015, the Pakistan Academy of Letters, International Writer's Council (IWC) and World Punjabi Congress (WPC) organised the Khawaja Farid Conference and demanded that a Punjabi-language university should be established in Lahore and that Punjabi language should be declared as the medium of instruction at the primary level. In September 2015, a case was filed in Supreme Court of Pakistan against Government of Punjab, Pakistan as it did not take any step to implement the Punjabi language in the province. Additionally, several thousand Punjabis gather in Lahore every year on International Mother Language Day.

Hafiz Saeed, chief of Jama'at-ud-Da'wah (JuD), has questioned Pakistan's decision to adopt Urdu as its national language in a country where majority of people speak Punjabi language, citing his interpretation of Islamic doctrine as encouraging education in the mother-tongue. Some of the organisations and activists that demand the promotion of the Punjabi language include:

- Cultural and research institutes: Punjabi Adabi Board, the Khoj Garh Research Centre, Punjabi Prachar, Institute for Peace and Secular Studies, Adbi Sangat, Khaaksaar Tehreek, Saanjh, Maan Boli Research Centre, Punjabi Sangat Pakistan, Punjabi Markaz, Sver International.
- Trade unions and youth groups: Punjabi Writers Forum, National Students Federation, Punjabi Union-Pakistan, Punjabi National Conference, National Youth Forum, Punjabi Writers Forum, National Students Federation, Punjabi Union, Pakistan, and the Punjabi National Conference.
- Notable activists include Tariq Jatala, Farhad Iqbal, Diep Saeeda, Khalil Ojla, Afzal Sahir, Jamil Ahmad Paul, Mazhar Tirmazi, Mushtaq Sufi, Biya Je, Tohid Ahmad Chattha and Bilal Shaker Kahaloon, Nazeer Kahut.

== Notable people ==
- List of people from Punjab, Pakistan, also includes people born in what is today Indian Punjab but moved to Pakistan after partition
- List of Punjabi people, also includes people of Punjabi ethnicity from India and elsewhere

== Bibliography ==
- Amjad, Yahya (1989). Tarikh-i Pakistan : qadim daur—zamanah-yi ma qabl az tarikh : Pakistan ki sarzamin par aj se paune do karor sal pahle (in Urdu).
- Dyson, Tim (2018), A Population History of India: From the First Modern People to the Present Day, Oxford University Press, ISBN 978-0-19-882905-8
- India. Census Commissioner (1941). Punjab (Report). Census of India, 1941. Vol. VI. Delhi. JSTOR saoa.crl.28215541.
- Pakistan Narcotics Control Board (1986), National survey on drug abuse in Pakistan, The University of Michigan
- Radha Kumud Mookerji (1989) [1951]. Ancient Indian Education: Brahmanical and Buddhist (2nd ed.). Motilal Banarsidass Publ. ISBN 81-208-0423-6.
- Roseberry, J. Royal (1987). Imperial Rule in Punjab: The Conquest and Administration of Multan, 1818-1881. Manohar. ISBN 978-81-85054-28-5.
- Shackle, Christopher (1979). "Problems of classification in Pakistan Panjab". Transactions of the Philological Society. 77 (1): 191–210. doi:10.1111/j.1467-968X.1979.tb00857.x. ISSN 0079-1636.
