= Ali Musa Gilani =

Pakistani politician

- علی موسیٰ گلانی

Member of the National Assembly of Pakistan
- Incumbent
- Assumed office 29 February 2024
- Preceded by: Zain Qureshi
- Constituency: NA-151 Multan-IV
- In office 24 October 2022 – 10 August 2023
- Preceded by: Zain Qureshi
- Constituency: NA-151 (Multan-IV)
- In office February 2012 – May 2013
- Constituency: NA-151 (Multan-IV)

Personal details
- Party: PPP (2012-present)
- Relations: Ali Haider Gillani (brother); Kasim Gilani (brother); Abdul Qadir Gillani (brother)
- Parent: Yusuf Raza Gilani (father)

Ali Musa Gilani (Note: Urdu: على موسىٰ گیلانی) is a Pakistani politician who has been a member of the National Assembly of Pakistan since February 2024 and previously served in this position from October 2022 till August 2023, and from 2012 to 2013. He contested the general election of 2013 and 2018 from PPP ticket.

He is an active political worker, writer and a polo player. He is the son of Yusuf Raza Gilani, former prime minister of Pakistan from 2008 to 2012.

== Political career ==
He was elected to the National Assembly of Pakistan from Constituency NA-148 (Multan-I) as a candidate of Pakistan Peoples Party (PPP) in by-polls held in February 2012. He received 93,106 votes and defeated Malik Abdul Gafar Dogar.

He ran for the seat of the National Assembly from Constituency NA-148 (Multan-I) as a candidate of PPP in the 2013 Pakistani general election, but was unsuccessful. He received 49,918 votes and lost the seat to Malik Abdul Gafar Dogar. He ran for the election on NA 157 in 2018 general elections and secured 72,000 votes. He was arrested on 25 November 2020 in Multan. Police arrested him over organising a rally without seek permission from the government, but later released on bail.
