= Abdul Qadir Gillani =

Pakistani politician

Syed Abdul Qadir Gillani
- سید عبد القادر گلانی

Member of the National Assembly of Pakistan
- Incumbent
- Assumed office 29 February 2024
- Constituency: NA-152 Multan-V
- In office July 2012 – 2013
- Constituency: NA-148 (Multan-I)

Personal details
- Born: 29 April 1981 (age 45) Lahore, Punjab, Pakistan
- Party: PPP (2012-present)
- Relations: Ali Musa Gilani (brother); Ali Haider Gillani (brother); Kasim Gilani (brother)
- Parent: Yusuf Raza Gilani (father)

Syed Abdul Qadir Gilani (Urdu: سید عبدالقادر گیلانی) is a Pakistani politician who has been a member of the National Assembly of Pakistan since February 2024 and previously served in this position from July 2012 to 2013. Previously he had been a member of the Provincial Assembly of the Punjab from June 2008 to July 2012.

== Early life and education ==
He was born on 29 April 1981 in Lahore.

He received the degree of Bachelor of Laws (Hons.) in 2003 from the University of Hertfordshire. Qadir and his brothers face allegations of petty corruption during their father's tenure as PM in 2008-2011.

== Political career ==
He ran for the seat of the National Assembly of Pakistan from Constituency NA-150 (Multan-III) as a candidate of Pakistan Peoples Party (PPP) in the 2008 Pakistani general election but was unsuccessful. He received 43,299 votes and lost the seat to Rana Mahmood-ul-Hassan.

He was elected un-contested to the Provincial Assembly of the Punjab as a candidate of PPP from Constituency PP-295 (Rahimyar Khan-VIII) in June 2008 by support of Makdoom Ahmad Mahmood.

He was elected to the National Assembly from Constituency NA-151 (Multan-IV) as a candidate of PPP in by-polls held in July 2012. He received 64,628 votes and defeated Shaukat Hayyat Khan Bosan.

He ran for the seat of the National Assembly from Constituency NA-151 (Multan-IV) as a candidate of PPP in the 2013 Pakistani general election but was unsuccessful. He received 56,858 votes and lost the seat to Sikandar Hayat Khan Bosan who received 96,632 votes.

He ran for the seat of the National Assembly from NA-154 Multan-I as a candidate of PPP in the 2018 Pakistani general election but was unsuccessful. He received 64,257 votes and lost the seat to Malik Ahmed Hussain Dehar, a candidate of Pakistan Tehreek-e-Insaf (PTI), who received 74,220 votes.

He was re-elected to the National Assembly from NA-152 Multan-V as a candidate of PPP in the 2024 Pakistani general election. He received 97,065 votes and defeated Syed Javed Ali Shah, a candidate of Pakistan Muslim League (N) (PML(N)).
