= Shaukat Hayat Bosan =

Pakistani politician

Shaukat Hayyat Khan Bosan

Member of the Provincial Assembly of the Punjab
- In office 29 May 2013 – 31 May 2018

Personal details
- Born: 4 November 1968 (age 58) Multan
- Party: Pakistan Muslim League (N)
- Relatives: Sikandar Hayat Khan Bosan (brother)

Punjab Assembly Lahore

Shaukat Hayyat Khan Bosan is a Pakistani politician who was a Member of the Provincial Assembly of the Punjab, from 1997 to 1999 and again from May 2013 to May 2018.

== Early life and education ==
He was born on 4 November 1968 in Multan.

He has received matriculation level education.

== Political career ==
He was elected to the Provincial Assembly of the Punjab as a candidate of Pakistan Muslim League (N) (PML-N) from PP-165 (Multan-VII) in the 1997 Punjab provincial election.

He ran for the seat of the National Assembly from Constituency NA-151 (Multan-IV) as a candidate of PML-N in by-polls held in July 2012. After Disqualification of Yousaf Raza Gillani.but was unsuccessful. Yousaf Son's Abdul Qadir Gillani won the MNA seat with Support of PPP Government and President Asif Ali Zardari.

He was re-elected to the Provincial Assembly of the Punjab as a candidate of PML-N from PP-200 (Multan-VII) in the 2013 Punjab provincial election.

He ran for the seat of the Provincial Assembly of the Punjab as an independent candidate from PP-211 Multan-I in the 2018 Punjab provincial election, but was unsuccessful. He received 21,913 votes and lost to Ali Haider Gillani, a candidate of the PPP.
