= NA-151 Multan-IV =

Constituency of the National Assembly of Pakistan

- Constituency for the National Assembly of Pakistan
- Region: Shujabad Tehsil (partly) and Multan Saddar Tehsil (partly) of Multan District
- Electorate: 239,745

Current constituency
- Created: 2022
- Party: Pakistan Tehreek-e-Insaf
- Member: Meher Bano Qureshi
- Created from: NA-157 Multan-IV

NA-151 Multan-IV (این اے-157،ملتان-4) is a constituency for the National Assembly of Pakistan.

== Election 2002 ==
General elections were held on 10 October 2002. Makhdoom Shah Mahmood Qureshi of PPP won by 76,606 votes.

General election 2002: NA-148 Multan-I
Party	Candidate	Votes	%	±%
PPP	Shah Mahmood Qureshi	76,606	61.16	
PML(N)	Javed Hashmi	44,095	35.21	
Others	Others (two Candidates)	4,547	3.63	
Turnout		127,015	44.72	
Total valid votes		125,248	98.61	
Rejected ballots		1,767	1.39	
Majority		32,511	25.95	
Registered electors		284,014		

== Election 2008 ==
General elections were held on 18 February 2008. Makhdoom Shah Mahmood Qureshi of PPP won by 83,184 votes.

General election 2008: NA-148 Multan-I
Party	Candidate	Votes	%	±%
PPP	Shah Mahmood Qureshi	83,184	56.37	
PML(Q)	Rai Mansab Ali	39,796	26.97	
PML(N)	Javed Hashmi	24,578	16.66	
Turnout		150,526	43.64	
Total valid votes		147,558	98.03	
Rejected ballots		2,968	1.97	
Majority		43,388	29.40	
Registered electors		344,896		
PPP hold				

== By-Election 2012 ==
By-Election 2012: NA-148 Multan-I
Party	Candidate	Votes	%	±%
PPP	Syed Ali Musa Gillani	93,106	67.42	
PML(N)	Malik Abdul Ghaffar Doggar	42,819	31.01	
Others	Others (sixteen candidates)	2,174	1.57	
Turnout		138,099	40.86	
Total valid votes		138,099	100	
Rejected ballots		0	0	
Majority		50,287	36.41	
Registered electors		338,007		
PPP hold				

== Election 2013 ==
General elections were held on 11 May 2013. Malik Abdul Ghafar Dogar of PML-N won by 81,830 votes, defeating Shah Mahmood Qureshi, the Vice Chairman of PTI, and became the member of National Assembly.

General election 2013: NA-148 Multan-I
Party	Candidate	Votes	%	±%
PML(N)	Malik Abdul Gafar Dogar	81,830	40.78	
PTI	Shah Mahmood Qureshi	64,763	32.28	
PPP	Ali Musa Gilani	49,918	24.88	
Others	Others (eight candidates)	4,140	2.06	
Turnout		204,961	58.43	
Total valid votes		200,651	97.90	
Rejected ballots		4,310	2.10	
Majority		17,067	8.50	
Registered electors		350,801		
PML(N) gain from PPP				

== Election 2018 ==
General elections were held on 25 July 2018.

General election 2018: NA-157 Multan-IV
Party	Candidate	Votes	%	±%
PTI	Zain Qureshi	77,373	35.24	▲3.04
PPP	Ali Musa Gilani	70,778	32.24	▲7.24
PML(N)	Malik Abdul Gafar Dogar	62,082	28.28	▼12.58
Others	Others (five candidates)	9,289	4.23	
Turnout		223,970	57.32	
Total valid votes		219,522	98.01	
Rejected ballots		4,448	1.99	
Majority		6,595	3.00	
Registered electors		390,725		
PTI gain from PML(N)				

== By-election 2022 ==
A by-election was held on 16 October 2022 due to the resignation of Zain Qureshi, the previous MNA from this seat.

By-election 2022: NA-157 (Multan-IV)
Party	Candidate	Votes	%	±%
PPP	Ali Musa Gillani	107,327	53.11	▲20.88
PTI	Mehar Bano Qureshi	82,141	40.65	▲5.41
TLP	Tahir Ahmad	5,559	2.75	▲0.07
Others	Others (five candidates)	7,040	3.48	
Turnout		204,404	44.22	▼13.10
Total valid votes		202,067	98.86	▲0.85
Rejected ballots		2,337	1.14	▼0.85
Majority		25,186	12.46	▲9.46
Registered electors		462,205		
PPP gain from PTI		Swing	15.46	

== Election 2024 ==
General elections were held on 8 February 2024. Ali Musa Gilani won the election with 156000votes.

General election 2024: NA-151 Multan-IV
Party	Candidate	Votes	%	±%
PTI	Meher Bano Qureshi	78,689	33.24	▲24.99
PPP	Ali Musa Gilani	60,157	30.12	▼10.53
PML(N)	Malik Abdul Gafar Dogar	71,466	30.04	
TLP	Irshad Ali Babar	10,271	4.32	▲1.57
Others	Others (five candidates)	5,418	2.28	
Turnout		254,451	53.62	▲9.40
Total valid votes		237,896	93.49	
Rejected ballots		2,337	6.51	
Majority		7,423	3.12	▼9.34
Registered electors		474,519		
PTI hold				

== See also ==
- NA-150 Multan-III
- NA-152 Multan-V
