= Sikandar Hayat Bosan =

Pakistani politician

Sikandar Hayat Khan Bosan
- سکندر حیات خان بوسان
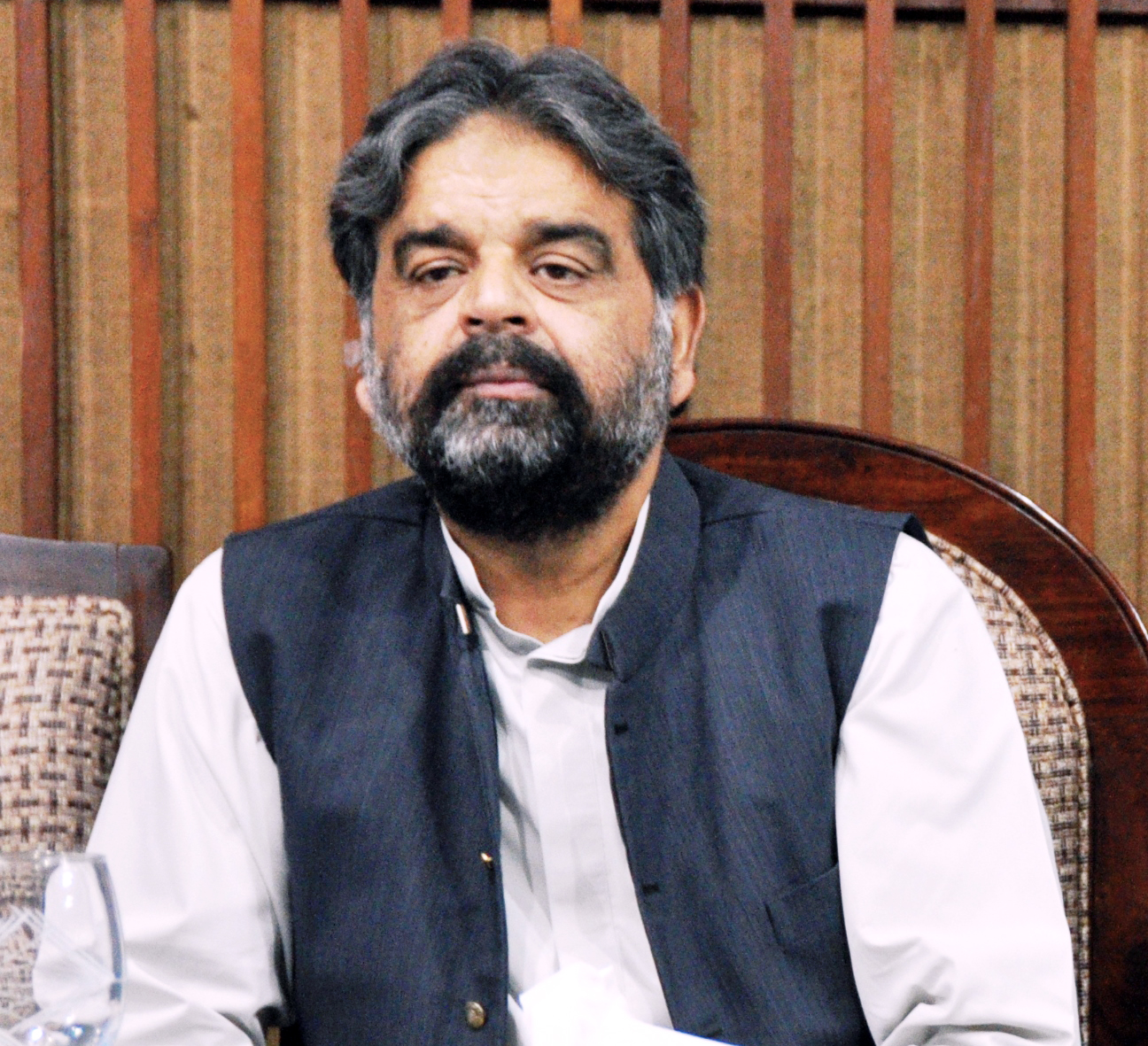

Federal Minister for National Food Security and Research
- In office 2013–2018
- President: Mamnoon Hussain
- Prime Minister: Shahid Khaqan Abbasi; Nawaz Sharif

State Minister for Food, Agriculture and Livestock
- In office 24 November 2002 – 4 September 2007

Personal details
- Born: 5 November 1957 (age 69) Multan
- Party: Independent (since 2018)
- Other political affiliations: Pakistan Peoples Party (1980-1985); Pakistan Muslim League (N) (1993-1999) (2013-2018); Pakistan Muslim League (Q) (2002-2008); Pakistan Tehreek-e-Insaf (2010-2012) (2018-2018)
- Relations: Shaukat Hayat Bosan (brother)
- Education: Matriculation

Sikandar Hayat Khan Bosan (Urdu: سکندر حیات خان بوسان; born 5 November 1957) is a Pakistani politician who served as Minister for National Food Security and Research, in Abbasi cabinet from August 2017 to May 2018. He previously served as the Minister for National Food Security and Research in the Third Sharif ministry. Bosan previously held the cabinet portfolio of Minister for Food, Agriculture & Livestock from 2004 to 2007 during the Shaukat Aziz ministry.

Bosan had been a member of the National Assembly of Pakistan between 1997 and May 2018. He served as Minister of State for Food, Agriculture and Livestock from 2002 to 2004 during the Zafarullah Khan Jamali ministry.

== Early life and education ==
He was born on 5 November 1957 in Multan, Pakistan.

He has done Matriculation.

== Political career ==
Bosan started his political career in 1983 as member of District Council Multan. He was elected as the member of the Provincial Assembly of Punjab in the 1985 Pakistani general election for the first time, in the 1988 Pakistani general election for the second time, and in the 1990 Pakistani general election for the third time.

Bosan become member of National Assembly of Pakistan for the first time in the 1997 Pakistani general election. In the 2002 Pakistani general election, he was re-elected as member of the National Assembly for the second time from constituency NA-151 on the ticket of Pakistan Muslim League (Q). In 2002, he was made Minister of state without portfolio and reportedly assigned to Ministry of Food, Agriculture and Livestock In 2004, he was formally appointed as Minister of State for Food, Agriculture and Livestock and later in 2004 was appointed as Minister for Food, Agriculture & Livestock.

In the 2008 Pakistani general election, Bosan lost the National Assembly seat to Yousaf Raza Gilani.

Bosan left Pakistan Muslim League (Q) to join the Pakistan Tehreek-e-Insaf (PTI). Later in 2013, he left the PTI and joined Pakistan Muslim League (N) (PML(N)).

In the 2013 Pakistani general election, he was re-elected to the National Assembly for the third time, as a candidate of the PML(N). He was made Minister for National Food Security & Research in June 2013.

He had ceased to hold ministerial office in July 2017 when the federal cabinet was disbanded following the resignation of Prime Minister Nawaz Sharif after Panama Papers case decision. Following the election of Shahid Khaqan Abbasi as the Prime Minister of Pakistan in August 2017, he was again inducted into the federal cabinet. He was appointed as the Federal Minister for National Food Security and Research. Upon the dissolution of the National Assembly on the expiration of its term on 31 May 2018, Bosan ceased to hold the office of Federal Minister for National Food Security and Research.

In 2018 he again joined the PTI and was allocated a party ticket to contest election from NA-154 Multan-I, but the ticket was taken back from him and he was expelled from the party on the orders of Imran Khan after harsh reactions within the PTI and from his constituents as he was a federal minister in the PMLN government. He contested the elections as an independent candidate from NA-154 Multan-I but was unsuccessful. He received 37,156 votes and was defeated by Malik Ahmed Hussain Dehar, a candidate of the PTI.

Political offices
Preceded by	Minister of State for Food, Agriculture and Livestock; 2002–2004	Succeeded by
Preceded by	Minister for National Food Security and Research; 2004–2007	Succeeded by
Preceded by	Minister for National Food Security and Research; 2013–present	Incumbent
