= Zain Qureshi =

Pakistani politician

Makhdoom Muhammad Zain Qureshi
- زین قریشی

Parliamentary Secretary for Finance, Revenue and Economic Affairs
- In office 27 September 2018 – 10 April 2022
- President: Arif Alvi
- Prime Minister: Imran Khan

Member of the National Assembly of Pakistan
- Incumbent
- Assumed office 29 February 2024
- Preceded by: Shah Mahmood Qureshi
- Constituency: NA-150 Multan-III
- In office 13 August 2018 – 18 July 2022
- Preceded by: Malik Abdul Gafar Dogar
- Constituency: NA-151 (Multan-IV)

Member of the Provincial Assembly of the Punjab
- In office 18 July 2022 – 14 January 2023
- Preceded by: Muhammad Salman Naeem
- Constituency: PP-218 Multan-VI

Personal details
- Born: 7 October 1982 (age 44) Multan, Punjab, Pakistan
- Party: PTI (2018-present)
- Relations: Sajjad Hussain Qureshi (grandfather); Zahoor Hussain Qureshi (cousin)
- Parent: Shah Mahmood Qureshi (father)

Makhdoom Muhammad Zain Qureshi (Urdu: مخدوم محمد زین حسین قریشی) is a Pakistani politician who has been a member of the National Assembly of Pakistan since February 2024 and previously served in this position from August 2018 to April 2022. He was also a Member of the Provincial Assembly of the Punjab from July 2022 to January 2023.

== Political career ==
Qureshi was elected to the National Assembly of Pakistan from Constituency NA-157 (Multan-IV) as a candidate of the Pakistan Tehreek-e-Insaf (PTI) in the 2018 Pakistani general election.

On 27 September 2018, Prime Minister Imran Khan appointed him as Federal Minister for Finance. He served till 10 April 2022, when he resigned from the assembly alongside other PTI members.

He was elected to the Provincial Assembly of Punjab from PP-218 Multan-VI as a candidate of the PTI in the 2022 Punjab provincial by-election. He took oath on 18 July 2022.

He was re-elected to the National Assembly from NA-150 Multan-III as an independent candidate supported by PTI in the 2024 Pakistani general election. He received 126,775 votes and defeated Javed Akhtar, a candidate of Pakistan Muslim League (N) (PML(N)).

== Professional career ==
In 2009, Qureshi interned as a legislative fellow in the office of U.S. Senator John Kerry. Following his time in the United States, he worked as a relationship manager at MCB Bank from 2009 to 2012.

== Personal life ==
Qureshi is the son of a former Pakistani foreign minister Shah Mahmood Qureshi.
