= Sajjad Hussain Qureshi =

Pakistani politician

Makhdoom Sajjad Hussain Qureshi

2nd Deputy Chairman of the Senate of Pakistan
- In office 21 March 1985 – 29 December 1985
- Chairman: Ghulam Ishaq Khan
- Succeeded by: Malik Muhammad Ali Khan

22nd Governor of Punjab
- In office 30 December 1985 – 9 December 1988
- President: Muhammad Zia-ul-Haq; Ghulam Ishaq Khan
- Preceded by: Ghulam Jilani Khan
- Succeeded by: Tikka Khan

Personal details
- Born: 24 September 1923
- Died: 23 January 1996 (aged 72)
- Relations: Zain Qureshi (grandson); Zahoor Hussain Qureshi (grandson)
- Children: Shah Mehmood Qureshi (son) Mureed Hussain Qureshi (son) Aamir Hussain Qureshi (son)
- Education: University of the Punjab (L.L.B)
- Occupation: Politician

Makhdoom Sajjad Hussain Qureshi (Urdu: سجاد حسین قریشی) (September 1923 – 23 January 1996) was the Governor of Punjab from 30 December 1985 to 9 December 1988. He did his Matriculation from Pilot Secondary School and B.A. from Govt. Emerson College. Makhdoom Sajjad Hussain Qureshi completed his L.L.B. from Punjab University Law College. His father Makhdoom Mureed Hussain Qureshi was member of the Central Legislative Assembly before the Partition of India. Qureshi actively participated in the movement for Pakistan on the instructions of Muhammad Ali Jinnah and visited Sindh and Balochistan to motivate the public in favour of a new Muslim state. He participated in the historical Lahore Resolution of 1940.

== Political career ==
He served as the mayor of Multan Municipality for 10 years. He was elected as a member of the National Assembly of Pakistan in 1962, 1965 and 1977. He remained member of the Federal Council of Pakistan from 1981 to 1985. He also became a member of the Senate of Pakistan and was elected the Deputy Chairman Senate of Pakistan in 1985. His son, Shah Mehmood Qureshi is the Vice Chairman of Pakistan Tehreek-e-Insaf and the former Minister of Foreign Affairs (Pakistan). His grandson Zain Hussain Qureshi was a member of the National Assembly of Pakistan from 2018-2022. His other grandson Kabir Ahmad Qureshi is a senior banker in Lahore.

== See also ==
- Shah Mahmood Qureshi

Political offices
Preceded by Ghulam Jilani Khan	Governor of Punjab; 30 Dec 1985 – 9 Dec 1988	Succeeded by Tikka Khan
