= Muhammad Salman Naeem =

Pakistani politician

Member of the Provincial Assembly of Punjab
- In office 15 August 2018 – 22 May 2022
- Constituency: PP-217 (Multan-VII)
- Constituency: PP-218 Multan-VI

Member of the Provincial Assembly of Punjab
- Incumbent
- Assumed office 24 February 2024

Personal details
- Born: 1 February 1993 (age 33) Vehari, Punjab, Pakistan
- Party: PML(Z) (2025-present)
- Other political affiliations: PMLN (2022-2025); PTI (2018-2022); IND (2018)

Muhammad Salman Naeem (Urdu: محمد سلمان نعیم; born 1 February 1993) is a Pakistani politician currently serving as a member of the Provincial Assembly of the Punjab from 23 February 2024 to present . He has been a member of the Punjab Assembly for the first time after defeating Pakistan's senior politician Shah Mehmood Qureshi as an independent candidate in the general elections 2018.

== Early life ==
He was born on February 1, 1993, in Vihari. He completed his childhood and education in Multan after the family migrated to Multan.

== Political career ==
He was elected to the Provincial Assembly of the Punjab as an independent candidate from Constituency PP-217 (Multan-VII) in the 2018 Pakistani general election.

He fought the election against the vice chairman of PTI Shah Mahmood Qureshi and defeated him with a big margin of votes as an independent candidate. Shah Mahmood was also a strong candidate for the chief minister Of Punjab in the 2018 election but after his defeat, he was out of the race.

He joined Pakistan Tehreek-e-Insaf (PTI) following his election due to the party's position in Punjab and with the support of Jahangir Tareen.

On 11 September 2018, he was inducted into the provincial Punjab cabinet of Chief Minister Usman Buzdar and was appointed as special assistant to the Chief Minister on transport.

On 1 October 2018, he was de-seated by the Election Commission of Pakistan as member of the Punjab Assembly after he was found underage.

A three-member bench of the Supreme Court of Pakistan reinstated MPA Muhammad Salman Naeem from Multan. The Supreme Court annulled the decision of the Election Commission of Pakistan against Muhammad Salman Naeem.

He also served in the Punjab Government cabinet regarding transport. He de-seated due to vote Hamza Shahbaz against party policy for Chief Minister of Punjab election on 16 April 2022.

He contested on the PMLN ticket in the by-election of July 17, 2022, and was defeated by Zain Qureshi, the son of Shah Mehmood Qureshi.
