= Kasim Gilani =

Pakistani politician

Syed Ali Qasim Gilani
- سید علی قاسم گلانی
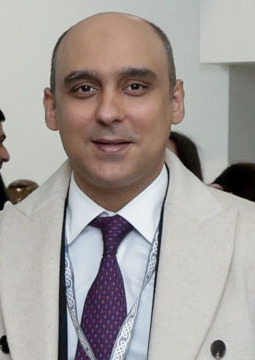

Member of the National Assembly of Pakistan
- Incumbent
- Assumed office 7 June 2024
- Constituency: NA-148 Multan-I

Personal details
- Born: 13 January 1984 (age 42) Multan, Punjab, Pakistan
- Party: PPP (2024-present)
- Relations: Ali Musa Gilani (brother); Ali Haider Gillani (brother); Abdul Qadir Gillani (brother)
- Parent: Yusuf Raza Gilani (father)

Syed Ali Kasim Gillani (Urdu: سید علی قاسم گلانی) is a Pakistani politician who has been a Member of the National Assembly of Pakistan since 2024.

== Biography ==
In June 2011, Gilani completed his Bachelor of Science degree in Business and Finance from Brunel University London.

He was elected to the National Assembly of Pakistan as a candidate of Pakistan People's Party (PPP) from Constituency NA-148 Multan-I in by-election held in May 2024.
