= Rana Mahmood-ul-Hassan =

Pakistani politician (1970–2019)

Member of the Senate of Pakistan
- Incumbent
- Assumed office 12 March 2018
- Constituency: General seat from Punjab (2018-2024); General seat from Islamabad (2024-present)

Member of the Provincial Assembly of the Punjab
- In office May 2015 – 10 March 2018
- Constituency: PP-196 (Multan-III)

Member of the National Assembly of Pakistan
- In office 2002–2013
- Constituency: NA-150 (Multan-III)

Personal details
- Party: PPP (2025-present)
- Other political affiliations: PMLN (2002-2025)

Rana Mahmood-ul-Hassan is a Pakistani politician who is a Member of the Senate of Pakistan, from March 2018 to-date. Previously, he has been a Member of the Provincial Assembly of the Punjab, from May 2015 to March 2018 and a Member of the National Assembly of Pakistan from 2002 to 2013.

== Early life and education ==
He was born on 27 March 1970 in Multan.

He completed graduation.

== Political career ==
He was elected to the National Assembly of Pakistan from Constituency NA-150 (Multan-III) as a candidate of Pakistan Muslim League (N) (PML-N) in the 2002 Pakistani general election. He received 22,387 votes and defeated a candidate of Pakistan Muslim League (Q) (PML-Q).

He was re-elected to the National Assembly from Constituency NA-150 (Multan-III) as a candidate of PML-N in the 2008 Pakistani general election. He received 57,774 votes and defeated a candidate of Pakistan Peoples Party (PPP).

He ran for the seat of the National Assembly from Constituency NA-150 (Multan-III) as a candidate of PML-N in the 2013 Pakistani general election but was unsuccessful. He received 79,680 votes and lost the seat to Shah Mehmood Qureshi, a candidate of Pakistan Tehreek-e-Insaf (PTI).

He was elected to the Provincial Assembly of the Punjab as a candidate of PML-N from Constituency PP-196 (Multan-III) in by-polls held in May 2015. He received 28,324 votes and defeated a candidate of PTI. He resigned from his Punjab Assembly seat on 10 March 2018.

He was nominated by PML-N as its candidate in the 2018 Pakistani Senate election. However the Election Commission of Pakistan declared all PML-N candidates for the Senate election as independent after a ruling of the Supreme Court of Pakistan.

He was elected to the Senate of Pakistan as an independent candidate on general seat from Punjab in Senate election. He was backed in the election by PML-N and joined the PML-N led treasury benches after getting elected. He took oath as Senator on 12 March 2018.
