= PP-213 Multan-I =

Constituency of the Punjabi Provincial Legislature, Pakistan

- Constituency for the Provincial Assembly of Punjab
- Region: Multan Saddar Tehsil (partly) including Qadirpur Ran city of Multan District

Current constituency
- Created from: PP-200 Multan-VII (2002-2018); PP-211 Multan-I (2018-2023)

PP-213 Multan-I (پی پی-213، ملتان-1) is a Constituency of Provincial Assembly of Punjab.

== General elections 2024 ==
Provincial election 2024: PP-213 Multan-I
Party	Candidate	Votes	%	±%
PPP	Ali Haider Gillani	42,407	35.23	
Independent	Haris Javed (Note: Filed nomination papers as PTI candidate but ECP allowed him to run as an independent)	33,350	27.70	
PML(N)	Shaukat Hayat Bosan	32,485	26.99	
TLP	Sajjad Hussain Shah	5,960	4.95	
Independent	Waseem Sajjad	2,190	1.82	
Others	Others (fourteen candidates)	4,090	3.31	
Turnout		123,241	55.06	
Total valid votes		120,382	97.63	
Rejected ballots		2,859	2.37	
Majority		9,057	7.53	
Registered electors		223,824		
hold				

== General elections 2018 ==
Provincial election 2018: PP-211 Multan-I
Party	Candidate	Votes	%	±%
PPP	Ali Haider Gillani	39,534	37.00	
PTI	Khalid Javaid Warriach	27,909	26.12	
Independent	Shoukat Hayat Khan Bosan	21,913	20.51	
PML(N)	Malik Amir Hussain Bapi	6,790	6.35	
Independent	Tahir Razzaq	5,742	5.37	
TLP	Zahid Hameed Gujjar	3,737	3.50	
Others	Others (nine candidates)	1,234	1.15	
Turnout		109,182	59.95	
Total valid votes		106,859	97.87	
Rejected ballots		2,323	2.13	
Majority		11,625	10.88	
Registered electors		182,117		

== General elections 2013 ==
Provincial election 2013: PP-200 Multan-VII
Party	Candidate	Votes	%	±%
PML(N)	Shaukat Hayyat Khan Bosan	42,992	40.21	
PPP	Syed Ali Haider Gillani	26,220	24.53	
PTI	Nasir Ali Haider	16,575	15.50	
Independent	Malik Ashiq Ali Shajra	12,874	12.04	
Independent	Muhammad Ahmed Asim Dehar	3,987	3.73	
Independent	Haji Sikandar Hayyat Khan Bosan	2,160	2.02	
Others	Others (twelve candidates)	2,101	1.97	
Turnout		110,303	59.63	
Total valid votes		106,909	96.92	
Rejected ballots		3,394	3.08	
Majority		16,772	15.68	
Registered electors		184,989		

== General elections 2008 ==
Contesting candidates	Party affiliation	Votes polled

== See also ==
- PP-212 Khanewal-VIII
- PP-214 Multan-II
