= NA-150 Multan-III =

Constituency of the National Assembly of Pakistan

- Constituency for the National Assembly of Pakistan
- Region: Multan City area of Multan District
- Electorate: 277,811

Current constituency
- Party: Pakistan Tehreek-e-Insaf
- Member: Zain Qureshi
- Created from: NA-156 Multan-III

NA-150 Multan-III (این اے-150،ملتان-3) is a constituency for the National Assembly of Pakistan.

== Election 2002 ==
General elections were held on 10 October 2002. Rana Mehmood Ul Hassan of PML-N won by 22,387 votes.

General election 2002: NA-150 Multan-III
Party	Candidate	Votes	%	±%
PML(N)	Rana Mahmood-ul-Hassan	22,387	28.85	
PML(Q)	Syed Tanveer Ul Hassan Gilani	17,636	22.73	
PPP	Malik Mukhtar Ahmad Awan	15,548	20.03	
Nizam-e-Mustafa Party	Hamid Saeed Kazmi	11,728	15.11	
MMA	Muhammad Yaqoob Rizvi	4,837	6.23	
NA	Abbas Ali Ansari	4,215	5.43	
Others	Others (five candidates)	1,257	1.62	
Turnout		79,193	27.51	
Total valid votes		77,608	97.26	
Rejected ballots		1,585	2.74	
Majority		4,751	6.12	
Registered electors		287,894		

== Election 2008 ==
General elections were held on 18 February 2008. Rana Mehmood Ul Hassan of PML-N won by 37,564 votes.

General election 2008: NA-150 Multan-III
Party	Candidate	Votes	%	±%
PML(N)	Rana Mahmood-ul-Hassan	57,774	45.54	
PPP	Abdul Qadir Gillani	43,299	34.13	
PML(Q)	Fazal Ahmad Sheikh	25,158	19.83	
Others	Others (three candidates)	632	0.50	
Turnout		128,262	32.07	
Total valid votes		126,863	98.91	
Rejected ballots		1,399	1.09	
Majority		14,475	11.41	
Registered electors		399,931		
PML(N) hold				

== Election 2013 ==
General elections were held on 11 May 2013. Makhdoom Shah Mehmood Qureshi of Pakistan tehreek insaf won by 92,761 votes and became the member of National Assembly.

General election 2013: NA-150 Multan-III
Party	Candidate	Votes	%	±%
PTI	Shah Mahmood Qureshi	92,761	48.62	
PML(N)	Rana Mahmood-ul-Hassan	79,680	41.76	
PPP	Babu Nafees Ahmad Ansari	12,208	6.40	
Others	Others (fifteen candidates)	6,136	3.22	
Turnout		192,940	51.68	
Total valid votes		190,785	98.88	
Rejected ballots		2,155	1.12	
Majority		13,081	6.86	
Registered electors		373,331		
PTI gain from PML(N)				

== Election 2018 ==
General elections were held on 25 July 2018.

General election 2018: NA-156 Multan-III
Party	Candidate	Votes	%	±%
PTI	Shah Mahmood Qureshi	116,383	53.17	
PML(N)	Amir Saeed Ansari	84,969	38.82	
TLP	Muhammad Asghar	6,304	2.88	
Others	Others (nine candidates)	11,228	5.13	
Turnout		221,777	49.87	
Total valid votes		218,884	98.70	
Rejected ballots		3045	1.37	
Majority		31,414	14.35	
Registered electors		444,724		

== Election 2024 ==
General elections were held on 8 February 2024. Zain Qureshi won the election with 126,775 votes.

General election 2024: NA-150 Multan-III
Party	Candidate	Votes	%	±%
PTI	Zain Qureshi (Note: Filed nomination papers as PTI candidate but ECP allowed him to run as an Independent)	126,775	51.00	▼2.17
PML(N)	Javed Akhtar Ansari	76,760	30.88	▼7.94
PPP	Rana Mahmood-ul-Hassan	25,553	10.28	
TLP	Muhammad Hussain Babar	9,936	4.00	▲1.12
Others	Others (twelve candidates)	9,556	3.84	
Turnout		256,341	43.31	▼6.56
Total valid votes		248,580	96.97	
Rejected ballots		7,761	3.30	
Majority		50,015	20.12	▲5.77
Registered electors		591,810		

== See also ==
- NA-149 Multan-II
- NA-151 Multan-IV
