= Ali Haider Gillani =

Pakistani politician

- علی حیدر گلانی

Member of the Provincial Assembly of the Punjab
- Incumbent
- Assumed office 24 February 2024
- Constituency: PP-213 Multan-I
- In office 15 August 2018 – 14 January 2022
- Constituency: PP-213 Multan-I
- Constituency: PP-213 Multan-I

Personal details
- Born: 13 January 1984 (age 42) Multan, Punjab, Pakistan
- Party: PPP (2018-present)
- Relations: Ali Musa Gilani (brother); Abdul Qadir Gillani (brother); Kasim Gilani (brother)
- Parent: Yusuf Raza Gillani (father)

Ali Haider Gillani is a Pakistani politician who is the son of former Prime Minister of Pakistan Yusuf Raza Gillani. He was a member of Provincial Assembly of Punjab from August 2018 till January 2023.

== Abduction ==
On 9 May 2013, he was kidnapped in his home district of Multan after unidentified gunmen attacked a gathering of the PPP. After three years, Ali, on 10 May 2016 was recovered in an operation by Afghan commandos in Ghazni, Afghanistan.

== Political career ==
He has been elected to the Provincial Assembly of the Punjab as a candidate of the Pakistan People's Party (PPP) in the 2018 Punjab provincial election from PP-211 Multan-I.
