= Secret Pakistan =

BBC documentary

Secret Pakistan is a two-part documentary by the BBC, first aired on 26 October 2011. It included claims by mid-ranking Taliban commanders that they had been taught bomb-making by Pakistan's Inter-Services Intelligence (ISI), and suggestions that the ISI had tipped off high-ranking al-Qaeda figures about imminent American attacks. The series generated controversy after Pakistan blocked BBC World News claiming it contained "anti-Pakistan" content and that the program was one sided.

== Reception ==
It received an audience of 1 million (4.1%) at 9pm.

The British newspaper The Independent called it "intriguing and depressing," although the reviewer felt the program should have focused more on the trustworthiness of American intentions towards Pakistan.
