= Malik Ahmed Hussain Dehar =

Pakistani politician

Member of the National Assembly of Pakistan
- In office 13 August 2018 – 10 August 2023
- Constituency: NA-154 (Multan-I)

Personal details
- Born: 1965 (age 60–61) Multan, Punjab, Pakistan
- Party: TLP (2025-present)
- Other political affiliations: PMLN (2012-2013; 2023-2025); PTI (2018-2023); PPP (2002-2012)

Malik Ahmed Hussain Dehar is a Pakistani politician who had been a member of the National Assembly of Pakistan from August 2018 till August 2023.

== Political career ==
Mr Ahmed Hussain Deharr son of Malik Muhammad Hussain was born on September 30, 1965. He has been elected as Member, Provincial Assembly of the Punjab in general elections 2008.His constituency was PP-200 and was an MPA under Prime minister Yousaf Raza Gillani.

He was allocated the ticket from PTI to contest the election from Constituency NA-154 (Multan-I) a few days before the 2018 general election after a large number of party workers put forward his name.

Dehar was elected to the National Assembly of Pakistan as a candidate of Pakistan Tehreek-e-Insaf (PTI) from Constituency NA-154 (Multan-I) in the 2018 general election. He received 74,220 votes and defeated Abdul Qadir Gillani.
