= Malik Abdul Gafar Dogar =

Pakistani politician

Malik Abdul Gaffar Dogar
- ملک عبدالغارڈوگر
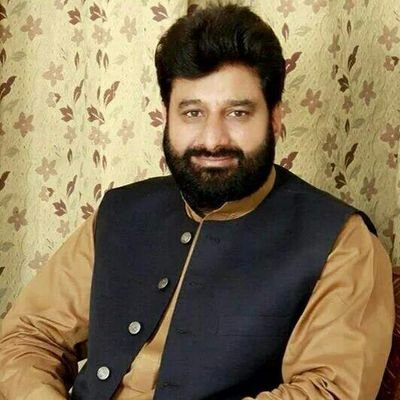

Member of the National Assembly of Pakistan
- In office 1 June 2013 – 31 May 2018
- Constituency: NA-148 (Multan-I)

Personal details
- Born: 1 January 1964 (age 62) Multan, Punjab, Pakistan
- Party: PMLN

Malik Abdul Gafar Dogar (Urdu: ملک عبدالغفار ڈوگر; born 1 January 1964) is a Pakistani politician who had been a member of the National Assembly of Pakistan from June 2013 to May 2018.

== Early life ==
He was born on 1 January 1964.

== Political career ==
He ran for the seat of the National Assembly of Pakistan as a candidate of Pakistan Muslim League (N) (PML-N) from Constituency NA-148 (Multan-I) in by-election held in 2012, but was unsuccessful. He received 42,819 votes and lost the seat to Syed Ali Musa Gillani.

He was elected to the National Assembly as a candidate of PML-N from Constituency NA-148 (Multan-I) in the 2013 Pakistani general election. He received 81,830 votes and defeated Shah Mehmood Qureshi. In October 2017, he was appointed as Federal Parliamentary Secretary for science and technology.
