= Constituency NA-148 =

Constituency NA-148 may refer to:

- NA-148 (Sahiwal-II), a present NA constituency based on 2018 delimitation
- NA-148 (Multan-I), a former NA constituency based on 2002 delimitation
