= Makhdoom =

Title for sufis

Makhdoom is a title for Pirs, and landlords in South and Central Asia.

== People with the title Makhdoom ==
- Makhdoom Yahya Maneri (1263 - 1379 AD) – a mystic who lived in Bihar Sharif
- Makhdoom Jahaniyan Jahangasht (1308- 1384 AD) - a world-traveling Sufi Saint who was spiritual master of king Firoz Shah Tughlaq, Ashraf Jahangir Simnani and 80 makhdooms of his time.
- Hamza Makhdoom – a mystic from Kashmir (d. 1563 AD)
- Zainuddin Makhdoom II - A mystic from Malabar
- Makhdoom Mian Mir – a Sufi mystic from Lahore who laid first foundation of the Golden Temple in Amritsar
- Makhdoom Ali Mahimi – a Sufi saint from the Konkan in India
- \Makhdoom Syed Yousaf Raza Gillani – a former Prime Minister of Pakistan
- Makhdoom Muhammad Ameen Faheem – a former Pakistani politician and leader of PPP
- Makhdoom Syed Faisal Saleh Hayat – a Pakistani politician affiliated with PML-Q and former Interior Minister of Pakistan
- Makhdoom Muhammad Javed Hashmi – a Pakistani politician, and central leader of PML-N
- Makhdoom Ali Khan – a former Attorney General of Pakistan
- Makhdoom Khusro Bakhtiar – a Pakistani politician, former Minister for Industries & Production of Pakistan
- Makhdoom Mohiuddin – an Urdu poet and Marxist politician from India
- Sayed Makhdoom Raheen – an ambassador of Afghanistan to India and former Information Minister of Afghanistan
- Makhdoom Shah Mehmood Qureshi – a Pakistani politician, former Foreign Minister of Pakistan
- Makhdoom Muhammad Zaman Talib-ul-Mola – the founding member of Pakistan Peoples Party and famous Sindhi poet
- Makhdoom Shahabuddin – a Pakistani politician
- Makhdoom Amin Fahim – a Pakistani politician
- Ammar Aziz - a Pakistani filmmaker
- Shah Makhdum Abdul Quddus Rupos - a Sufi saint from Shahzadpur in Bangladesh.
