= NA-148 Multan-I =

Constituency of the National Assembly of Pakistan

- Constituency for the National Assembly of Pakistan
- Region: Multan City (partly) including Multan Cantonment Multan Saddar Tehsil (partly) of Multan District
- Electorate: 213,333

Current constituency
- Party: Pakistan People's Party
- Member: Kasim Gilani
- Created from: NA-154 Multan-I

NA-148 Multan-I (این اے-148،ملتان-1) is a constituency for the National Assembly of Pakistan.

== Election 2002 ==
General elections were held on 10 October 2002. Sikandar Bosan of PML-Q won by 47,368 votes.

General election 2002: NA-151 Multan-IV
Party	Candidate	Votes	%	±%
PML(Q)	Sikandar Hayat Bosan	47,368	44.14	
PPP	Syed Ahmad Mujtaba Gillani	44,039	41.04	
PML(N)	Muhammad Sultan Alam Ansari	13,296	12.39	
Others	Others (four candidates)	2,604	2.43	
Turnout		109,224	40.12	
Total valid votes		107,307	98.25	
Rejected ballots		1,917	1.75	
Majority		3,329	3.10	
Registered electors		272,267		

== Election 2008 ==
General elections were held on 18 February 2008. Syed Yousaf Raza Gillani of PPP won by 77,664.

General election 2008: NA-151 Multan-IV
Party	Candidate	Votes	%	±%
PPP	Yusuf Raza Gilani	77,664	54.38	
PML(Q)	Sikandar Hayat Bosan	45,765	32.01	
PML(N)	Malik Majid Bucha	18,413	12.89	
Others	Others (three candidates)	989	0.72	
Turnout		145,641	41.48	
Total valid votes		142,831	98.07	
Rejected ballots		2,810	1.93	
Majority		31,899	22.37	
Registered electors		351,092		
PPP gain from PML(Q)				

== By-Election 2012 ==
By-Election 2012: NA-151 Multan-IV
Party	Candidate	Votes	%	±%
PPP	Abdul Qadir Gilani	64,340	50.97	
Independent	Shaukat Hayat Bosan	60,761	48.13	
Others	Others (eight candidates)	1,132	0.90	
Turnout		127,777	41.50	
Total valid votes		126,233	98.79	
Rejected ballots		1,544	1.21	
Majority		3,579	2.84	
Registered electors		307,871		
PPP hold				

== Election 2013 ==
General election 2013: NA-151 Multan-IV
Party	Candidate	Votes	%	±%
PML(N)	Sikandar Hayat Bosan	95,714	48.19	
PPP	Abdul Qadir Gillani	56,858	28.63	
PTI	Mian Salman Ali Qureshi	38,647	19.46	
Others	Others (fifteen candidates)	7,400	3.72	
Turnout		203,564	56.18	
Total valid votes		198,619	97.57	
Rejected ballots		4,954	2.43	
Majority		38,856	19.56	
Registered electors		362,313		
PML(N) gain from PPP				

== Election 2018 ==
General election 2018: NA-154 Multan-I
Party	Candidate	Votes	%	±%
PTI	Malik Ahmed Hussain Dehar	74,220	37.09	
PPP	Abdul Qadir Gillani	64,257	32.11	
Independent	Sikandar Hayat Bosan	37,126	18.56	
others	others(other 10 candidates)	39,031	12.24	
Total votes		385,233	100	
Turnout		219,737	57.04	
Total valid votes		214,744		
Rejected ballots		5,120		
Majority		10,021	4.98	
Registered electors		385,233		

== Election 2024 ==
General elections were held on 8 February 2024. Yusuf Raza Gilani won the election with 68,110 votes but vacated the seat in favour of a seat in the Senate.

General election 2024: NA-148 Multan-I
Party	Candidate	Votes	%	±%
PPP	Yusuf Raza Gilani	68,110	31.09	▼1.02
PTI	Malik Taimur Altaf Mahay (Note: Filed nomination papers as PTI candidate but ECP allowed him to run as an Independent)	67,969	31.02	▼6.07
PML(N)	Malik Ahmed Hussain Dehar	58,525	26.71	▲16.94
TLP	Malik Azhar Ahmad Sandila	12,550	5.73	▲2.16
Others	Others (nine candidates)	11,951	5.45	
Turnout		232,117	53.10	▼3.94
Total valid votes		219,105	94.39	
Rejected ballots		13,012	5.61	
Majority		141	0.06	
Registered electors		437,157		
PPP gain from PTI				

== By-election 2024 ==
A by-election was held on 19 May 2024.

By-election 2024: NA-148 Multan-I
Party	Candidate	Votes	%	±%
PPP	Kasim Gilani	85,863	60.40	▲29.31
SIC	Malik Taimur Altaf Mahay	52,354	36.82	
TLP	Malik Azhar Ahmad Sandila	2,242	1.58	▼4.15
Others	Others (four candidates)	1,699	1.20	
Turnout		143,381	32.28	▼20.82
Total valid votes		142,158	99.15	
Rejected ballots		1,223	0.85	
Majority		33,509	23.58	▲23.52
Registered electors		444,231		
PPP hold				

== See also ==
- NA-147 Khanewal-IV
- NA-149 Multan-II
