= Shah Mahmood Qureshi =

Pakistani politician and Chief Minister of Punjab (born 1956)

Makhdoom Shah Mahmood Qureshi
- شاہ محمود قریشی
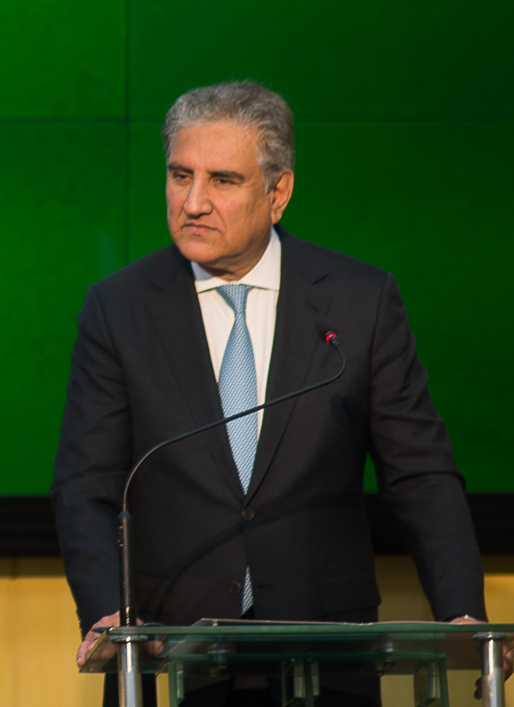
- Qureshi in March 2022

Minister of Foreign Affairs
- In office 20 August 2018 – 10 April 2022
- Prime Minister: Imran Khan
- Preceded by: Abdullah Hussain Haroon (Caretaker)
- Succeeded by: Bilawal Bhutto Zardari
- In office 31 March 2008 – 9 February 2011
- Prime Minister: Yusuf Raza Gillani
- Preceded by: Inam-ul-Haq (Caretaker)
- Succeeded by: Hina Rabbani Khar

Mayor of Multan
- In office 28 March 2001 – 5 January 2002
- Preceded by: Malik Aamir Dogar
- Succeeded by: Maj Azam Suleman (Acting)

Minister of State for Parliamentary Affairs
- In office 20 December 1994 – 5 November 1996
- Prime Minister: Benazir Bhutto
- Preceded by: Tanvir ul Hasan Gilani
- Succeeded by: Shahid Hamid

Provincial Minister for Finance of Punjab
- In office 1990–1993
- Governor: Mian Muhammad Azhar; Chaudhry Altaf Hussain
- Chief Minister: Ghulam Haider Wyne

Provincial Minister of Punjab for Planning and Development
- In office 1988–1990
- Governor: Tikka Khan
- Chief Minister: Nawaz Sharif

Member of the National Assembly of Pakistan
- In office 2018–2023
- Constituency: NA-150 Multan-III
- In office 2013–2018
- Constituency: NA-150 Multan-III
- In office 2008–2011
- Constituency: NA-151 Multan-IV
- In office 2002–2007
- Constituency: NA-151 Multan-IV
- In office 1993–1996
- Constituency: NA-151 Multan-IV

Member of the Provincial Assembly of Punjab
- In office 1990–1993
- Constituency: PP-219 Multan
- In office 1988–1990
- Constituency: PP-219 Multan
- In office 12 March 1985 – 30 May 1988
- Constituency: PP-219 Multan

Personal details
- Born: Makhdoom Shah Mahmood Hussain Qureshi; 22 June 1956 (age 70) Multan, Punjab, Pakistan
- Party: PTI (2011–present)
- Other political affiliations: PPP (1993–2011); IJI (1988–1993)
- Children: Zain Qureshi
- Parent: Sajjad Hussain Qureshi (father)
- Education: University of Cambridge; Stanford University

Makhdoom Shah Mahmood Hussain Qureshi (born 22 June 1956) is a Pakistani politician who has twice served as the Federal Minister for Foreign Affairs of Pakistan, first from 2008 to 2011 and later from 2018 to 2022. He has served as the Pakistan Tehreek-e-Insaf (PTI)'s Vice Chairman since 2011. Qureshi has had an extensive parliamentary career, serving five non-consecutive terms as a Member of the National Assembly of Pakistan between 1993 and 2022, representing Multan. He previously served as a Member of the Provincial Assembly of Punjab for three consecutive terms from 1985 to 1993.

Born in Multan, Punjab, Qureshi received his early education at Aitchison College. He later obtained a Bachelor of Arts degree from Forman Christian College and a Master of Arts degree from Corpus Christi College, Cambridge. He entered provincial politics in 1985 and remained a member of the Provincial Assembly of Punjab for nine years. During this period, he held various ministerial portfolios in the Punjab provincial cabinet between 1988 and 1993.

Qureshi entered federal politics in the 1990s and served as the Minister of State for Parliamentary Affairs from 1993 to 1996. He later served as the Mayor of Multan from 2000 to 2002 before returning to parliamentary politics. He was elected to the National Assembly of Pakistan from Multan in 2002, 2008, 2013, and 2018.

In 2008, Qureshi was appointed Federal Minister for Foreign Affairs in the government of Yousaf Raza Gillani, serving until 2011. He joined the Pakistan Tehreek-e-Insaf in 2011 and was appointed as the party's Vice Chairman. Following the 2018 Pakistani general election, he again became Foreign Minister in the government of Imran Khan, serving from 2018 until 2022.

Qureshi was elected as a Member of the National Assembly in the 2018 Pakistani general election and resigned from his seat on 10 April 2022 during the political crisis surrounding the removal of Prime Minister Imran Khan.

In July 2025, Qureshi was acquitted by an Anti-Terrorism Court in Lahore in a case related to the May 9 riots that followed the arrest of Imran Khan. The court cited insufficient evidence while clearing Qureshi and several other accused individuals. The case remained politically controversial, with opposition parties alleging political victimisation, while government authorities maintained that the proceedings were conducted according to law.

Qureshi remains one of the senior-most leaders of the Pakistan Tehreek-e-Insaf. Following subsequent political developments, he has been regarded as one of the leading contenders for the office of Chief Minister of Punjab if PTI forms the provincial government.

== Early life and education ==
Qureshi was born on 22 June 1956 in Multan, Punjab to a wealthy, political and prominent Makhdoom Qureshi family. His family is of saintly lineage and caretakers of the Shrine of Bahauddin Zakariya in Multan, which provides the family with substantial income, as well votes during the elections. However, in 2014, he rejected the claims saying "I have never used religion for political gain. I have never dragged devotees of Sufi saints in political matters, and those who vote for me do it of their free will." after his brother accused Qureshi was using the names of Sufi saints for political gains and Qureshi using donations for the PTI.

Qureshi is fluent in Urdu, English, Punjabi and Saraiki. Qureshi's father Makhdoom Sajjad Hussain Qureshi was former member of Senate of Pakistan and 15th Governor of the Punjab from 1985 to 1988 and was close friend of then President of Pakistan Muhammad Zia-ul-Haq who appointed him as governor of Punjab. Qureshi received his early education from Aitchison College, Lahore, a bachelor's from Forman Christian College and received MA (Law) and MA (History) degree from Corpus Christi College, Cambridge. He also holds a B.A. degree from University of the Punjab.

Qureshi is married and he is a father of one son, named Zain Hussain Qureshi and two daughters. Qureshi is an agriculturalist and was the president of the Farmers Association of Pakistan.

== Political career ==
Qureshi was elected for the first time to the Provincial Assembly of the Punjab from Multan in the 1985 Pakistani general election which were held on a non-party basis during the military government of Muhammad Zia-ul-Haq. He joined the Pakistan Muslim League (PML) in 1986.

=== Pakistan Muslim League (N) ===
Qureshi later joined the faction of PML led by Nawaz Sharif, which would later become PML (N). When PML split in 1988 after the death of Zia-ul-Haq, and was re-elected for the second time to the Provincial Assembly of the Punjab from Multan in the 1988 Pakistani general election and served as the Minister of Planning and Development in the provincial cabinet of Punjab of then Chief Minister of Punjab Nawaz Sharif from November 1988 to August 1990.

Qureshi was re-elected for the third time to the Provincial Assembly of the Punjab from Multan as a candidate of PML N in the 1990 Pakistani general election and served as the Minister of Finance in Chief Minister Manzoor Wattoo's provincial cabinet of Punjab from 1990 to 1993.

=== Pakistan People's Party ===
In 1993 he joined the Pakistan People's Party. Qureshi was elected for the first time to the National Assembly of Pakistan from Multan as a candidate of PPP in the 1993 Pakistani general election. He was appointed Minister of State for Parliamentary Affairs under then Prime Minister of Pakistan Benazir Bhutto ministry. In November 1996, he was appointed the spokesman of PPP.

Qureshi was defeated in the 1997 Pakistani general election by Makhdoom Javed Hashmi of PML-N. He was offered a position in the Council of Economic Advisers to then President of Pakistan Pervez Musharraf, which he refused.

Qureshi served as the District Nazim (mayor) of Multan from 2000 to 2002. During his mayor period, he well administered the Multan district and oversaw a number of development projects.

He was re-elected for the second time to the National Assembly of Pakistan from Multan in the 2002 Pakistani general election on PPP seat and defeated Makhdoom Javed Hashmi. Reportedly, he used his influence as a mayor of Multan to win the 2002 elections. In 2006, Benazir Bhutto appointed Qureshi as the President of Pakistan Peoples Party Punjab to revive the popularity of PPP in southern Punjab given his good experience. Reportedly, Qureshi slapped an officer for beating a party activist of PPP in 2006.

He was re-elected for the third time to the National Assembly of Pakistan from Multan in the 2008 Pakistani general election.

=== First term as Foreign minister ===
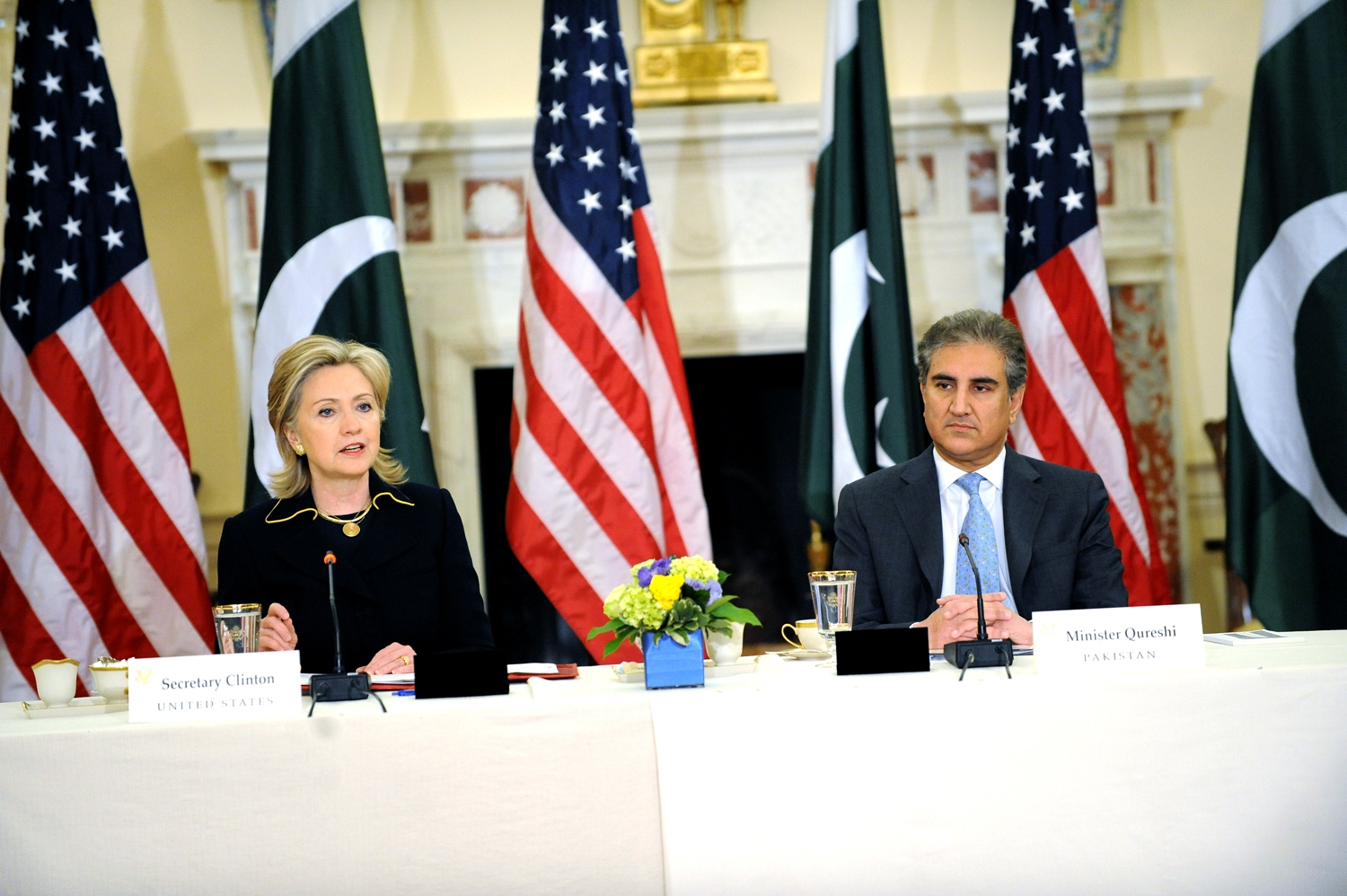
U.S. Secretary of State Hillary Clinton and Qureshi at the 2010 U.S. Pakistan Strategic Dialogue meeting.

Reportedly, Qureshi was a potential candidate for the Prime Minister of Pakistan in the coalition government headed by the PPP. However, Qureshi was instead given the post of Minister of Foreign Affairs in the cabinet of Prime Minister Yousaf Raza Gillani.

After taking charge of the office, Qureshi immediately made clear that he was committed to establishing peace in the region and that maintaining friendly ties with neighbouring India were amongst his top priorities. Qureshi went on his first visit as foreign minister to China in October 2008 with then Defence Minister of Pakistan Ahmad Mukhtar and then President of Pakistan Asif Ali Zardari.

In 2011, Qureshi faced criticism in Pakistan when it was discovered that his son, Zain H. Qureshi, was working as a Legislative Fellow in the office of Senator John Kerry.

In February 2011, the Government of Pakistan reduced the number of cabinet seats and during the transition, Qureshi was offered the position of Minister of Water and Power. He declined, saying that he was "not interested in water and power ministry in place of foreign affairs."

In February 2011, he lost the portfolio of Foreign Minister following the Raymond Davis affair.

In November 2011, Qureshi resigned from the PPP where he had been for the past 20 years. He also quit his National Assembly membership saying that "I had joined the PPP under Benazir Bhutto's leadership, and PPP was no longer a party of Shaheed Mohtarma Benazir Bhutto; it is now Zardari league. He said he did not want to be a part of Zardari league and announced to resign from the party membership."

Qureshi is one of three prominent politicians from Multan District, the other two being the Yousaf Raza Gillani and Javed Hashmi (Multan II) and are considered political rivals to each other. It was reported that Qureshi would re-join PML-N.

=== Pakistan Tehreek-e-Insaf ===
In late November 2011, Qureshi announced joining the Pakistan Tehreek-i-Insaf (PTI) at a rally in Ghotki. On 4 December 2011, he was appointed the first Vice Chairman of Pakistan Tehreek-e-Insaf as its parliamentary leader in National Assembly of Pakistan. In 2016 intra-party elections, Qureshi was re-appointed the Vice Chairman of PTI, which is considered one of the three senior most positions in the party. He was re-elected to the National Assembly from Multan in the 2013 Pakistani general election on the ticket of Pakistan Tehreek-e-Insaf.

=== Second term as Foreign minister ===
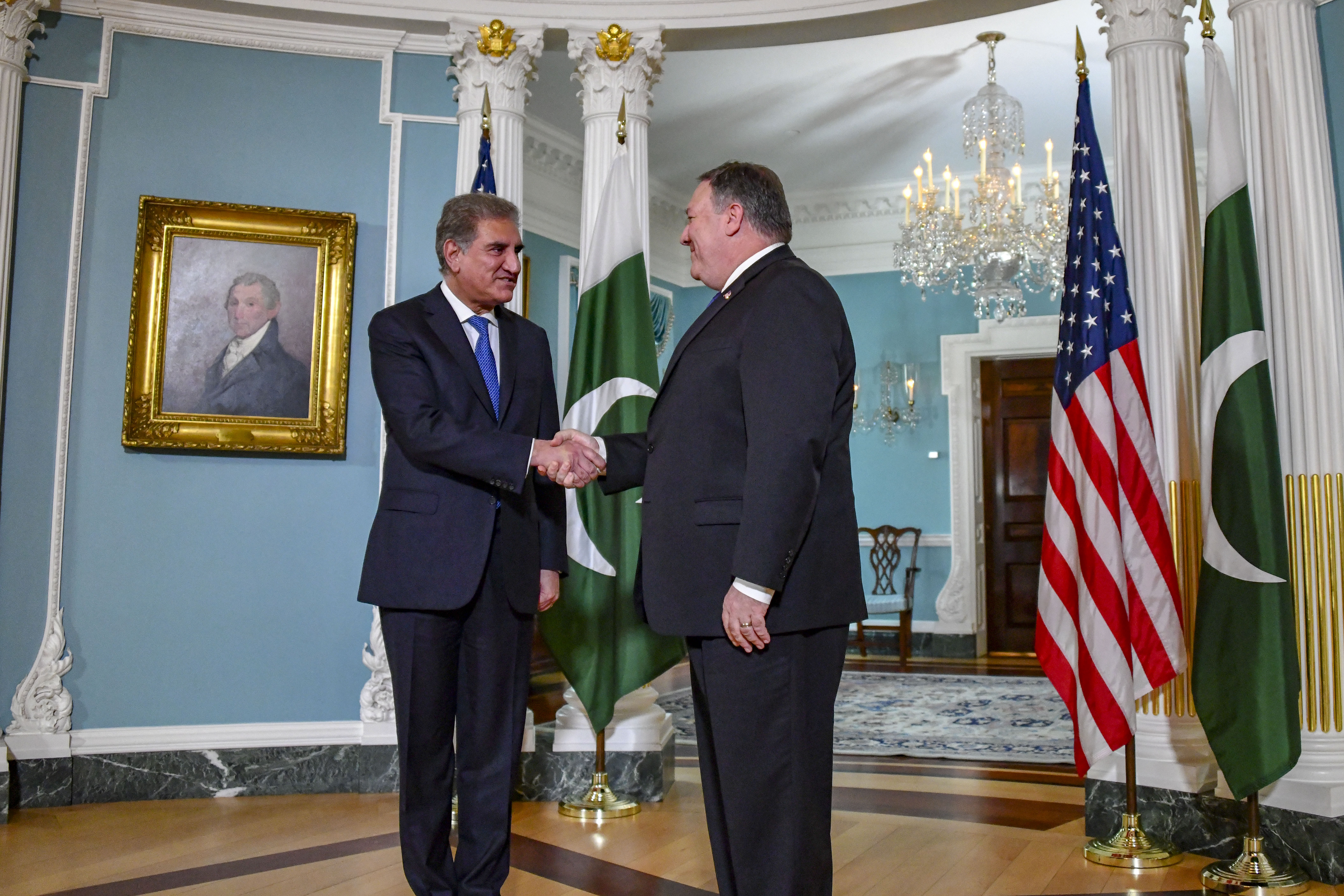
Qureshi with Mike Pompeo in Washington.

He was re-elected to the National Assembly as a candidate of PTI from Constituency NA-156 (Multan-III) in the 2018 Pakistani general election. Following his successful election, he emerged as PTI's nominee for the office of Speaker of the National Assembly. Reportedly, Imran Khan convinced him to take the office because of his long parliamentary experience. However, Qureshi showed reluctance to take the portfolio.

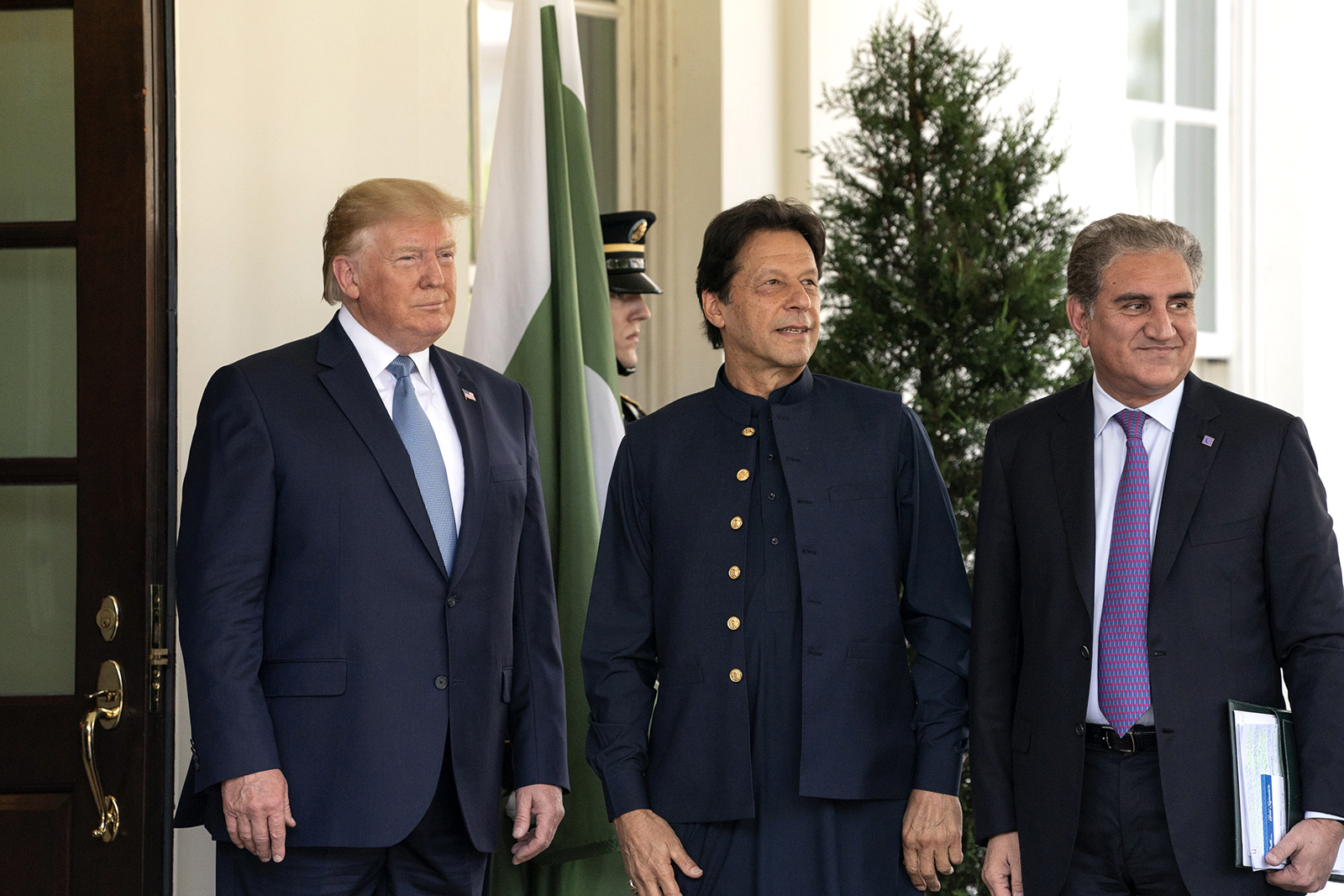
Qureshi (right) with Prime Minister Imran Khan (centre) and Donald Trump (left) in 2019.

On 18 August, Imran Khan formally announced his federal cabinet structure and Qureshi was named as Minister for Foreign Affairs. On 20 August 2018, he was sworn in as Federal Minister for Foreign Affairs in the federal cabinet of Prime Minister Imran Khan.

On 21 May 2021, while he was in New York City at an emergency session held by the United Nations General Assembly on 20 May to discuss a response to the 2021 Israel–Palestine crisis, Qureshi conducted an interview with American journalist Bianna Golodryga on CNN. During the interview, Qureshi stated: "Israel is losing out. They're losing the media war despite their connections"; Golodryga asked, "What are their connections?"; to which Qureshi replied, "Deep pockets." before elaborating further: "Well, they are very influential people. I mean, they control media." Golodryga responded, "I would call that an antisemitic remark," and the comment sparked controversy and a public discussion of Jewish stereotypes.

=== Arrest and Imprisonment ===
On 20 August 2023, Qureshi was arrested by authorities due to his relation to Lettergate on the basis of using the diplomatic "cypher" cable for political gains. He was tried on charges of making state secrets public in violation of the Official Secrets Act. The Supreme Court of Pakistan ordered his release from Adiala jail, though he was re-arrested on 27 December 2023. His re-arrest drew widespread criticism from PTI and international observers for mistreatment as Qureshi was manhandled and dragged to his jail cell by police. PTI stated that his arrest was a sign of fascism in Pakistan. Former President Arif Alvi stated that "treating an ex foreign minister from two regimes in an undignified manner must draw the attention of the authorities."

== Personal life ==
On 3 July 2020, Qureshi announced he had tested positive for COVID-19 days after holding high-profile meetings including one with U.S. special representative on Afghanistan Zalmay Khalilzad in Islamabad. He eventually recovered.

== Notes ==
Political offices
Preceded by Inam-ul-Haq	Minister of Foreign Affairs; 2008–2011	Succeeded by Hina Rabbani Khar
Preceded by Abdullah Hussain Haroon; Caretaker	Minister of Foreign Affairs; 2018–2022	Succeeded by Bilawal Bhutto Zardari
