= Yousaf Raza Gillani =

Prime Minister of Pakistan, 2008–2012

Makhdoom Yousaf Raza Gilani
- یوسف رضا گیلانی
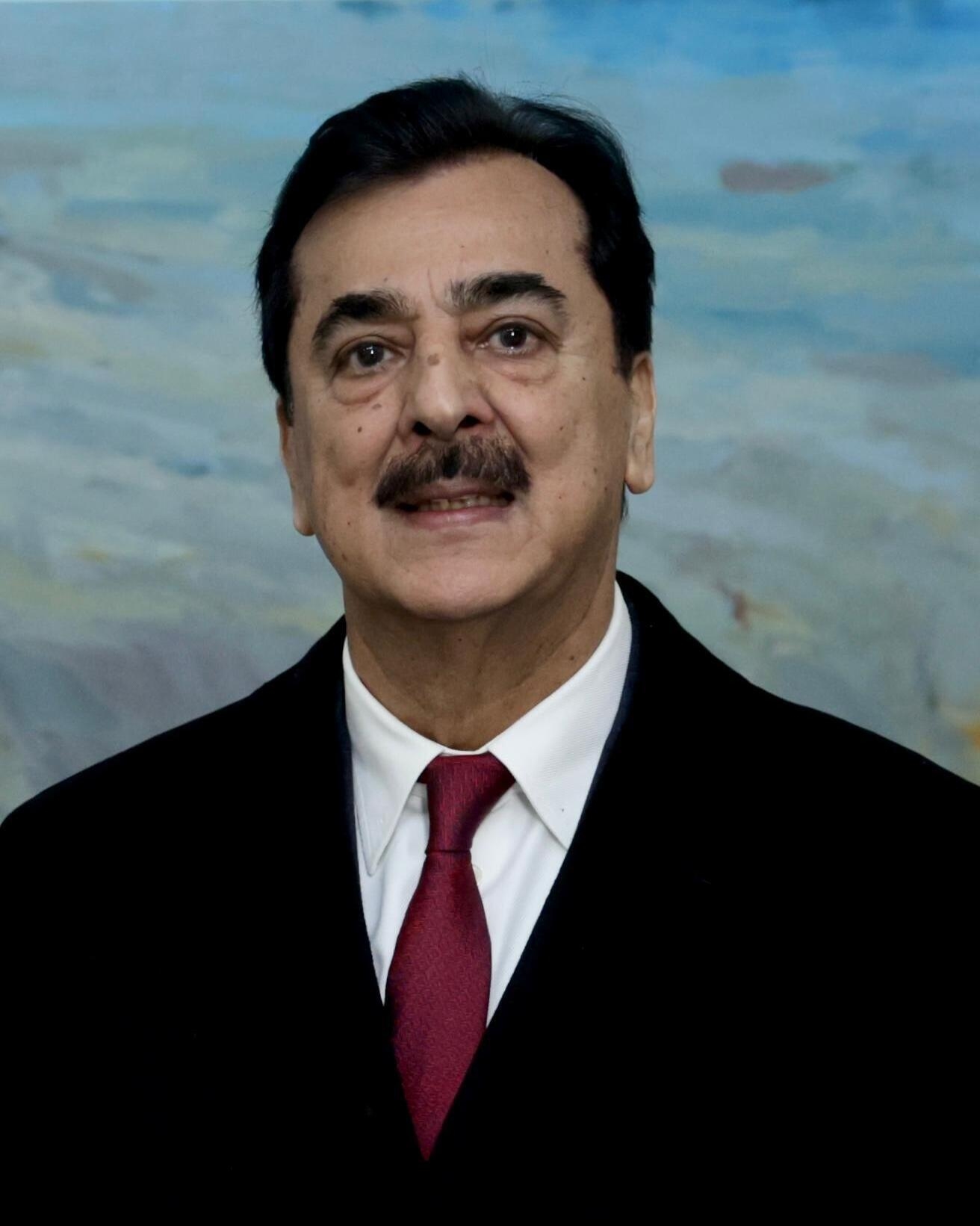
- Gilani in January 2025

16th Prime Minister of Pakistan
- In office 25 March 2008 – 19 June 2012
- President: Pervez Musharraf; Muhammad Mian Soomro (Acting); Asif Ali Zardari
- Preceded by: Muhammad Mian Soomro (Caretaker) (Note: Shaukat Aziz as Prime Minister)
- Succeeded by: Raja Pervez Ashraf

9th Chairman of the Senate of Pakistan
- Incumbent
- Assumed office 9 April 2024
- President: Asif Ali Zardari
- Deputy: Syedaal Khan Nasar
- Preceded by: Sadiq Sanjrani

Member of the Senate of Pakistan
- Incumbent
- Assumed office 4 April 2024
- In office 12 March 2021 – 29 February 2024

13th Speaker of the National Assembly of Pakistan
- In office 17 October 1993 – 16 February 1997
- Deputy: Syed Zafar Ali Shah
- Preceded by: Gohar Ayub Khan
- Succeeded by: Elahi Bux Soomro

Leader of the Opposition in the Senate of Pakistan
- In office 26 March 2021 – 30 January 2022
- Preceded by: Raja Zafar-ul-Haq
- Succeeded by: Shahzad Waseem

Minister of Housing and Works
- In office 1988–1990
- Prime Minister: Benazir Bhutto
- Preceded by: Mir Hazar Khan Bijarani
- Succeeded by: Islam Nabi

Minister of Railways
- In office 28 January 1986 – 20 December 1986
- Prime Minister: Muhammad Khan Junejo
- Preceded by: Abdul Ghafoor Hoti
- Succeeded by: Sardarzada Muhammad Ali Shah

Mayor of Multan
- In office 1983–1985
- Succeeded by: Salahuddin Dogar

Member of the National Assembly of Pakistan
- In office 29 February 2024 – 22 March 2024
- Constituency: NA-148 Multan-I
- In office 19 March 2008 – 19 June 2012
- Constituency: NA-148 Multan-I
- In office 19 October 1993 – 16 February 1997
- Constituency: NA-148 Multan-I
- In office 1990–1993
- Constituency: NA-148 Multan-I
- In office 1988–1990
- Constituency: NA-148 Multan-I

Personal details
- Born: 9 June 1952 (age 74) Multan, Punjab, Pakistan
- Party: PPP (from 1980)
- Other political affiliations: PML (until 1980)
- Spouse: Fauzia Gilani
- Children: 5 (including Kasim Gilani)
- Education: Government College University; University of the Punjab

Yousaf Raza Gilani (Note: Urdu: یوسف رضا گیلانی; pronounced [ˈjuːsʊf rəˈzaː ɡɪˈlaːniː]) (born 9 June 1952) is a Pakistani politician who served as the 16th Prime Minister of Pakistan from 2008 to 2012. He is currently the Chairman of the Senate of Pakistan, a position he has held since 2024. He belongs to the Pakistan People's Party. Gilani remains the first and only ethnic Saraiki Prime Minister of the country.

Born in Multan, Gilani studied political journalism from the Government College University and University of the Punjab in Lahore. In 1978, he joined the Pakistan Muslim League (PML) and worked in the government of President Muhammad Zia-ul-Haq. Gilani resigned from the Muslim League in 1986 and subsequently joined the PPP in 1988. He served in the cabinet of Benazir Bhutto as the Minister of Tourism in 1989–1990, Minister of Local Government and Rural Development in 1990–1993 and Speaker of the National Assembly in 1993–1997. Gilani was arrested in 2001 on accusations of corruption by military president Pervez Musharraf and was imprisoned for around six years at the Adiala Jail in Rawalpindi.

After the assassination of Benazir Bhutto in 2007, Gilani was elected prime minister in the 2008 general elections by the Central Executive Committee of the People's Party. Upon inauguration, he strengthened parliamentary democracy and began an impeachment motion against Musharraf, which prompted the latter to abscond from the country. Furthermore, Gilani initiated ineffective foreign policies, nationalisation programmes and founded the University of Swat in July 2010. He is commonly credited with ending the judicial crisis in March 2009 and improving nuclear energy projects throughout the country. In June 2012, Gilani was disqualified by the Supreme Court of Pakistan on corruption allegations. He briefly exiled from national politics until April 2017, when his disqualification term ended. He was the Leader of the Opposition in the Senate of Pakistan from 2021 to 2022.

Chairman Gilani served as the acting president of Pakistan from 20 May 2024 till 30 May 2024, this was during the period President Asif Ali Zardari remained abroad. Gilani is a veteran of Pakistan People's Party, and is currently serving as the vice-chairman of the party's Central Executive Committee, and in 2021 was elected as a Senator and his term ended when he took oath as a Member of the National Assembly of Pakistan on 29 February 2024 and vacated the seat on 22 March 2024.

== Early life and education ==
Yusuf Raza Gilani was born on 9 June 1952, in Multan, Punjab, West-Pakistan, to a Saraiki family of Sufi Sayyids. He later moved to Lahore. Gilani attended Government College University and obtained his B.A. in journalism in 1970, and followed by an MA in Political journalism from the University of the Punjab in 1976. In an interview given to Vasatolah Khan of BBC Urdu, Gilani maintained that "if he had not pursued his career in the national politics, he would have been a civil engineer."

=== Personal life ===
==== Extended family ====
His family is purportedly descended from Sunni theologian Abd al-Qadir al-Jilani and Sufi saint Musa al-Jilani.

His father Makhdoom Syed Alamdar Hussain Gilani was one of the signatories of the Pakistan Resolution and later served as the Federal and Provincial minister of Pakistan and Punjab respectively. His uncle Makhdoom Syed Wilayat Hussain Shah served as the chairman of the District council Multan whereas he also remained a member of the legislative assembly. His grandfather Makhdoom Syed Ghulam Mustafa Shah also served as the chairman of the Municipal Corporation of Multan and later got elected as a member of the legislative assembly in the 1945–46 general elections. His great-grandfather Makhdoom Syed Sadar-ud-din Shah Gilani was invited to the Delhi Darbar in 1910 whereas Sadar-ud-Din Shah Gilani's Brother Makhdoom Syed Rajan Baksh Gilani remained a member of the legislative council and later served as the first Muslim mayor of Multan.

His uncle Miran Muhammad Shah was a landlord and spiritual leader from Rahim Yar Khan whose daughter married the Pir of Pagaro VII.

His cousin Jalil Abbas Jilani is a diplomat who served as the Foreign Secretary of Pakistan in 2012–2013.

==== Immediate family ====
Gillani is married to Fauzia Gillani, together they have four sons and one daughter. His eldest son, Abdul Qadir Gillani, started his own political career from Multan, and in 2008 he married the granddaughter of Pir Pagara Shah Mardan Shah II, an influential political and religious leader of Sindh. Abdul Qadir is alleged to have been involved in a corruption case over arrangements for pilgrims to Mecca and in a scandal at a state-owned insurance company. Gillani's three other sons Ali Qasim Gillani, Ali Musa Gillani and Ali Haider Gillani are triplets. Qasim Gillani is currently doing his undergraduate studies at Brunel University of London. Gillani's daughter Fiza Gillani is the Good-Will Ambassador of Women and has one son called Asfandyar Gillani. Musa Gillani in 2009 and was an MNA in his father's cabinet. Ali Haider Gillani studied at School of Economics in Lahore. Ali Musa Gillani after completing his studies is now actively participating in politics. Ali Musa was questioned by the Anti-Narcotics Force (ANF) agents over a scandal.

On 9 May 2013, his son, Ali Haider Gilani, was kidnapped by several armed men in Multan in central Pakistan during an election rally. A group called the Al Mansuri Brigade kidnapped him. He spent three years in captivity, before being rescued in a joint operation between American-led NATO special forces and Afghan forces in May 2016.

== Political career ==
Yousaf Raza Gillani's political career started in the military government of President General Zia-ul-Haq in 1978, after he joined as a member of the Central Working Committee (CWC) of the Pakistan Muslim League (PML), alongside industrialist Nawaz Sharif. He soon left the PML, because of political differences with the PML's leadership. He was chosen by General Zia-ul-Haq as a nominee for public servant work in Multan. In 1983, Gillani was elected as the chairman of the District Council Multan commonly known as District Mayor or Zila Nazim in Pakistan.

He first ran in the non-partisan and technocratic 1985 general elections and was elected as the Member of the National Assembly (MNA) of Parliament from Lodhran, but was later affiliated with the Pakistan Peoples Party after developing serious political differences with the Pakistan Muslim League (PML), led by conservative leader Fida Khan. Gillani fell out with Prime minister Mohammad Junejo and was sidlined from the Pakistan Muslim League (PML) by the senior leadership. Later, he was ousted by Prime minister Junejo and was replaced by other members. According to Gillani's personal account, he went to Karachi to meet with Benazir Bhutto during the 1980s and presented his political experience, wanting to join the Peoples Party. After securing a party ticket and successfully running in the 1988 general elections, Gillani joined the first government of Prime minister Benazir Bhutto and became minister of the Ministry of Tourism (MoT) in March 1989 until January 1990. Later he became minister of Ministry of Housing and Work Force.

Gillani also retained his seat in the 1990 general elections by gaining more than 60 Thousand votes. He once again successfully ran in the 1993 general elections and took the oath of the office of Minister for Ministry of Local Government and Rural Development. However, he resigned from his ministry after being nominated by Benazir Bhutto for office of the Speaker of the National Assembly of Pakistan in 1993. He was the Speaker of the National Assembly of Pakistan until 1997 when the new general election in 1997 was held in the country. He was succeeded by Ilahi Bux Soomro of the Pakistan Muslim League-N on 2 February 1997.

In July 2018, he contested from constituency NA-158 (Multan) but lost from PTI candidate Muhammad Ibrahim Khan. He secured 74443 votes and Muhammad Ibrahim Khan got 83304 votes.

== Imprisonment ==
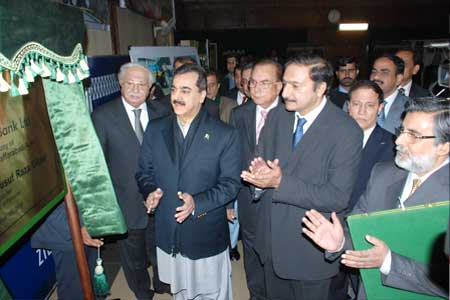
Inaugurating a Zarai Taraqiati Bank Limited Zonal Office at Muzzafarabad

Yousaf Raza Gillani was arrested on 11 February 2001 by the Military Police functioning under the military-controlled National Accountability Bureau (NAB)— an anti-corruption agency set up by the military government in 1999, over charges that he, along with other politicians, misused his authority while he was Speaker of the National Assembly in 1993–97. Specifically, he was accused of hiring up to 600 people from among his constituents and placing them on the government's payroll. The NAB claimed that Gillani inflicted a loss of Rs 30 million annually on the national exchequer. He was convicted by an anti-corruption court headed by an active-duty officer appointed by General Musharraf and spent nearly six years in prison.

The legal proceedings were perceived by many as politically motivated; his party, the PPP, was in opposition to Musharraf, who had embarked on a campaign to coerce party members to switch sides. Thus his conviction by General Musharraf-backed courts and subsequent prison sentence were seen as marks of loyalty within the PPP. His imprisonment was widely condemned by various individuals across the country, including Mushahid Hussain Syed, a senior leader of the PML-Q. He was released on 7 October 2006 from Adiala Jail, after spending more than five years in captivity. On 26 April 2012, Prime minister Gillani was convicted on the charges of Contempt of Court, becoming Pakistan's first Prime Minister to be convicted while holding office. He was sentenced to be held in custody till the rising of court, a symbolic sentence lasting 30 seconds.

== Prime Minister (2008-2012) ==
On 22 March 2008, after weeks of consideration, the elite members of the Central Executive Committee accepted the nomination of Gillani over populist Ameen Faheem for the post of prime minister. Meanwhile, the Pakistan Peoples Party completed consultations and negotiations with the other parties to form a coalition alliance and the alliance endorsed the nomination. The formal announcement of the name of prime minister was expected to be made that night.

On 22 March at 9:38 pm Islamabad, (16:38 GMT), Gillani was officially announced by the peoples party as its candidate for the premiership of the country. Many analysts said that they would not be surprised if Zardari succeeded Gillani after a few months. It was reported on 24 March 2008, that Zardari said he was not interested in the job of prime minister and that Gillani would serve until 2013 in the position. Speculation that Zardari might be gunning for the premiership grew stronger when he picked the less popular Gillani over Ameen Faheem, a much powerful member of the central executive committee. Fahmida Mirza, the newly elected Speaker of the Assembly, insisted there was no plan to replace Gillani. She added, however, that if Gillani did not do a good job, all options were open.

On 24 March 2008, Gillani was elected Prime Minister by Parliament, defeating his rival, Chaudhry Pervaiz Elahi of the PML-Q, by a score of 264 to 42. He was sworn in by Musharraf on the next day. On 29 March, he won a unanimous vote of confidence in Parliament.

On the same day, following the vote of confidence, Gillani announced his programme for the first 100 days of his administration. Some of the points he announced were:

- Frontier Crimes Regulations and Industrial Relations Order repealed.
- A "truth and reconciliation commission" proposed.
- PM House budget cut by 40 percent.
- Special counters at airports for parliamentarians to be removed.
- No money to be spent on the renovation of government buildings and residences.
- A freedom of information law to be framed, while PEMRA will be made a subsidiary of the information ministry.
- Talks to be initiated with extremists who lay down arms and 'adopt the path of peace'.
- A new package for tribal areas promised.
- Employment commission to be set up.
- Madressah authority to implement a uniform education curriculum.
- One million housing units to be built annually for low-income groups.
- Irrigation channels to be bricklined.
- Appointed Prof. Ghulam Hussain Saleem and Wazir Ibadat adviser to the prime minister for Gilgit Baltistan Affairs.
- A lifting of the bans on elected labour and students' unions.

=== Consolidation of power ===
The first part of Gillani's Cabinet was sworn in on 31 March. Of the 24 ministers sworn in on this occasion, 11 were members of the Pakistan Peoples Party, nine were members of the Pakistan Muslim League (PML), two were members of the Awami National Party, one was from Jamiat Ulema-e-Islam, and one came from the Federally Administered Tribal Areas. Other appointments were expected to follow. Gillani consolidated his powers and successfully lessening the role of president Pervez Musharraf who found it difficult to counter Gilani's collective leadership with full force. Musharraf failed to gather the support in the country, and Gillani's position was fairly secure; however he could not have remove Musharraf alone.

Gillani secretly but more effectively persuaded his party's leadership to bring about an impeachment motion against President Pervez Musharraf. According to The News International, Gillani reportedly told at the meeting of the central committee that "they all should "swim and sink" with the political forces of PML in the larger interests of democracy. Sources claimed that Gillani had raised concerns bout the deteriorating image of the peoples party, which was seen as working with Musharraf to the much annoyance of the media and the people of Pakistan. Gillani assertively pleaded to central committee that "if at any stage they all have to make a final choice between Musharraf and Nawaz Sharif, then central committee's leaders should be standing with the PML in line with the democratic credentials of the party."

On 13 May 2008, the PML (N) ministers resigned from Gillani's government due to a disagreement related to the reinstatement of judges whom Musharraf removed from office in 2007. Zardari, hoping to preserve the coalition, told Gillani to reject the resignations. At the close of 2008, Pakistan's The Financial Daily conducted a public poll on its website; respondents entered the names of their favourite personalities for the year, and Gillani was named among the top 50. Musharraf's foreign trips were cancelled, and Gilani decided to paid a state visit to China instead of Musharraf, to attend the ceremony of 2008 Beijing Olympics. A public movement led by the Peoples Party-Muslim league nexus, Musharraf dramatically resigned from the presidency after delivering an hour long farewell speech on 18 August 2008. Reacting upon Musharraf's removal, Gillani publicly called for national celebration, and marked Musharraf's resignation as "historic day." Nationwide celebration were held in the entire country. In a special sitting of parliament, Gillani quoted to his collective alliance, "Today we have buried dictatorship for ever."

=== Energy policy ===
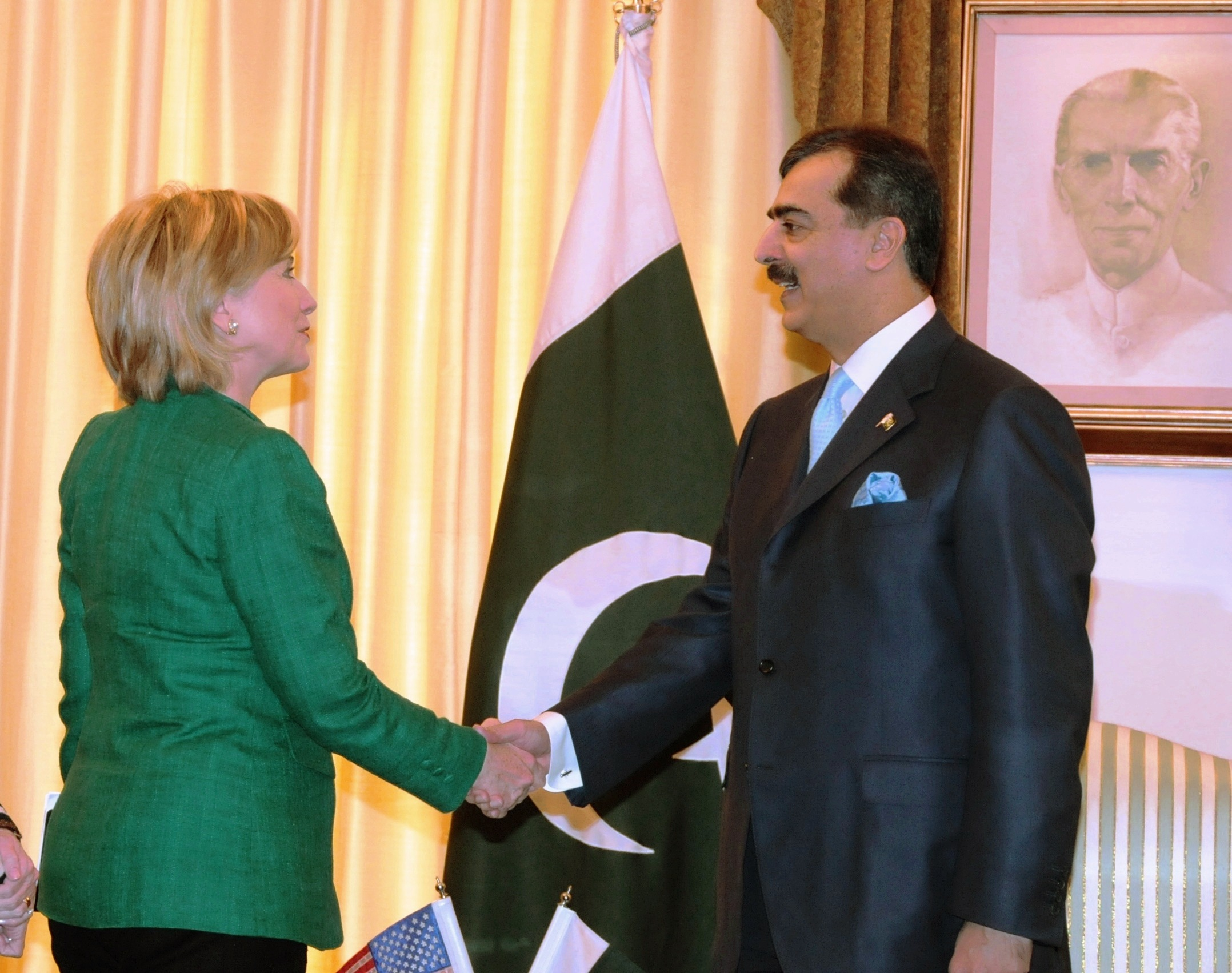
Gillani with U.S. Secretary of State Hillary Clinton in Islamabad, 2009

In April 2010, Gillani announced the energy policy to deal with the severe electricity shortage facing Pakistan. In 2010, Gillani went on to attend the Nuclear Security Summit held in Washington, D.C., where he issued a statement saying Pakistan would like to act as a provider and "participate in any non-discriminatory nuclear fuel cycle assurance mechanism. His government tightened the nuclear safety programme, and expanded the role of Nuclear Regulatory Authority (PNRA). In 2012, Gillani attended the 2012 Nuclear Security Summit where he defended the right of Pakistan's access to nuclear technology for peaceful uses on a non-discriminatory basis. His government announced the approval the safeguards agreements of the two commercial civil nuclear power plants, and inaugurated the CHASNUPP-III nuclear power plant in Chasma. In 2012, Gillani gave approval of establishing two civilian nuclear power plant in Karachi to meet the future energy needs of financial and economical development.

After the 1988 general elections, he secured his ministerial appointment in the Ministry of Tourism in the government of former prime minister Benazir Bhutto, and since then, he had been a senior member of parliament for the Multan District. After his party secured the plurality in the 1993 general elections, Gillani was elevated as the 15th Speaker of the National Assembly by the Prime Minister Benazir Bhutto, a post he held until 16 February 1997. On 11 February 2001, Gillani was imprisoned in Adiala Jail by a military court instituted under President Pervez Musharraf on accusations and charges of corruption, and released on 7 October 2006.

On 9 April 2012, Gillani chaired the second energy conference held in Lahore. As part of the federal government's energy conservation plan, Gillani had ordered that air-conditioners of the Prime Minister House and Prime Minister's Secretariat could not be switched on before 11 am. According to the government sources, Gillani's government has levelled up the nuclear energy programme up ~ 78% for two combined 664 MW commercial nuclear plants, C-3 and C-4 at Chashma Nuclear Power Complex to be completed at their record time. The ground work on Karachi Nuclear Power Complex was also laid in 2012 as part of his nuclear policy. Amid public rage and media pressure, the Gillani government also intensified its ground work on the Thar coal electric project that could develop another source of cheap electricity generation, despite the strong opposition by the planning commission.

On 18 June 2012, a strong and powerful public protest took place against the electricity shortage and load shedding, in Punjab Province. The offices of WAPDA corporations were destroyed, a fashion mall was looted while a completely gutted a three carriages of the train. After learning the news, Gillani summoned a national energy conference in Islamabad to take notice of power crisis. Gillani ordered his staff to double its effort to harness the electricity by any means of force after chairing the conference.

Pakistan does not harbour any aggressive designs against any state, but it is determined to defend its territorial integrity.... That is why we need to maintain a balance in conventional forces suitably backed by minimum credible deterrence. Pakistan will continue to "develop her military potential that guarantees peace with honour and dignity". "Our military capability is basically for the deterrence purpose while peace remains the ultimate cherished goal for Pakistan..."

— Yousaf Raza Gillani, describing the official nuclear weapons policy statement in 2012, source

=== Economy ===
After 2008, the value of US Dollar increased as compare to state currency, indicating the country's return to "Era of Stagflation" (a virtual period faced by Pakistan in the 1990s).

In his first days of government, Gillani attempted to continue the privatisation of Shaukat Aziz, but the programme was abruptly terminated after the 2008 financial crisis. Gillani accepted the resignation of two Finance ministers and surprisingly appointed the former minister privatisation and investment in the government of Shaukat Aziz, Dr. Abdul Hafeez Shaikh as a new Finance Minister. Early attempts were to discontinue the nationalisation programme by Gillani's government and instead replacing it with a new system based on state capitalism. The state-owned corporations were set off to privatisation menu and his government approved a new menu of privatisation based on public private partnership (PPP) with transfer of management control and 26% shares of 21 state owned enterprises (SOEs). No timetable was given instead his government announced that the privatisation process would be completed when international market would be feasible. During his first years of government, Gillani's government obtained unprecedented loans from International Monetary Fund which increased the level of poverty in the country.

The GDP growth rate dropped down to 4.19% (2009) as compared to 8.96% in 2004.

In January 2012, Prime minister Gillani announced the "economic sector have been achieved during the first six months of the current fiscal due to the prudent policies of the present government". In the parliament, Gillani pointed out that the fiscal deficit had come down from 9.4% to 7.6% and inflation that had reached 25% had been reduced to 9.7% during December 2011. In a policy statement, Gillani stated that the "country's GDP growth rate will be 4% basically due to the enhanced agricultural production and the web of taxation has been increased". The tax collection in 2011 was more 27% comparing to 2010. An unsuccessful attempt was carried out by Gillani's government to privatise the mega-state corporations, particularly the power sector; major nationalised industries such as WAPDA, IESCo, TESCo, PEPCo were proposed by the finance ministry to privatise the power distribution companies. Major worker's strike were initiated by the central labour unions, and after receiving much criticism, his government halted the privatisation programme of energy sector, and nationalised the remaining power sector industries due to public pressure.

According to the calculation performed by Transparency International (TI), Pakistan has lost an unbelievably high amount, more than Rs 8,500 billion (Rs 8.5 trillion or US$94 billion), in corruption, tax evasion and bad governance during the last four years of Prime Minister Yusuf Raza Gilani's tenure. An adviser of TI acknowledged that "Pakistan does not need even a single penny from the outside world if it effectively checks the menace of corruption and ensures good governance". The Transparency International also noted that the four years of the present regime under Gilani had been the worst in terms of corruption and bad governance in the country's history. After the recognition of failure of privatisation programme, Gillani gave authorisation of controversial nationalisation programme after a cabinet meeting in Khyber Pakhtunkhwa Province on 15 December 2011. Under this programme, three major and giant corporations, Steel Mills, Pakistan Railways and Pakistan International Airlines (PIA), were brought down under the government ownership, in an attempt to restructure, and made profitable.

On 1 June 2012, prime minister Syed Yusuf Raza Gilani claimed that the government was committed to resolving the energy crisis and achieving energy security for the country, adding that Pakistan's power sector was presently facing a wide demand-supply gap, which had necessitated the enhancement of generation capacity as well as related infrastructure.

In spite of many attempts to produce effective outcomes, the dramatic high rise in suicide, corruption, national security, high unemployment, and without the sustainable economic policies along with compilation of other factors, the country's economy re-entered in the "era of stagflation" (a virtual period that country had seen in 1990s earlier). The Pakistan economy slowed down dramatically to ~4.09% as compared to 8.96%—9.0% presided under his predecessor, Shaukat Aziz in 2004–08; while the yearly growth rate has come down from a long-term average of 5.0% to ~2.0%, though it did not reached to negative level. Calculation performed by the Pakistan Institute of Development Economics, it pointed out that the "nation's currency in circulation as a percentage of total deposits is 31%, which is very high as compared to India", where 40.0% of the population fell under the line of poverty, with 16.0% rise in the inflation during his four years of presiding over the country. The new strict and tight monetary policy could not tame the soaring inflation, it did stagnate the economic growth. One economist maintained that stagflation took place when the tight monetary policy did not encourage the strong private sector to play a key part in growth. Analyzing the stagflation problem, the PIDE observed that a major cause of continuous era of stagflation in Pakistan was lack of co-ordination between fiscal and monetary authorities.

=== Domestic policies ===
==== First public speech as Prime minister ====
On 19 July 2008 at 11:06 pm (Pakistan Standard Time), Gillani appeared on PTV News in his first address to the nation. The main points in his address were focused on the crisis of flour shortage, load-shedding, terrorism and extremism, restoration of judges, economic downslide and, above all, inflation and unemployment in the country.

==== 2008 assassination attempt ====
Gillani escaped an assassination attempt on 3 September 2008, when unidentified gunmen fired shots at his motorcade near the garrison city of Rawalpindi, officials said. The shooting occurred shortly after Gillani was returning from an official visit to the eastern city of Lahore. His motorcade was going to Islamabad from the high-security Chaklala military airbase in Rawalpindi. A spokesman for the Prime Minister's House said Gillani and members of his staff had escaped unhurt and were safe. He said police had been put on high alert and an investigation launched into the incident. The unidentified assailants fired at Gillani's motorcade on a highway. At least two shots hit the Prime Minister's bulletproof vehicle, TV channels quoted officials as saying. State-run PTV beamed footage of the damage caused by the bullets to the window of the driver's door of the vehicle. Reports said the incident occurred at a spot where former premier and PML-N chief Nawaz Sharif's motorcade was fired at on 27 December last year, shortly before Pakistan People's Party (PPP) chairperson Benazir Bhutto was assassinated in a suicide bombing in Rawalpindi.

According to Gillani's press secretary, Zahid Bashir, a car carrying Gillani was hit by 10 bullets in an attack near Islamabad on 3 September 2008; Bashir said that Gillani was unharmed. The Pakistan-based Taliban group claimed responsibility for the attack.

==== Cultural policies and media reforms ====
Upon coming to power, Gillani emphasised his media policy by noting to the fact that "a free and robust media is the main pillar of the Pakistan Government's media policy." Gillani pushed forward a proposal which amended the "Draconian" laws in past to support media freedom in the country.

Pakistan is not only a state but an idea and an ideal that our courageous and talented people strive, in their daily lives, to translate into reality.

— Gillani, 2011 state of the union address to Parliament, Cited source

Gillani followed the cultural and television policy of Benazir Bhutto and in the light of Supreme Court verdict, Gillani ordered PEMRA to blackout of Indian television channels, though he ordered the restoration of religious channels. Gillani emphasised the role of Pakistan's media and encouraged the film, drama, and national performing art industry to promote national spirit in the country. In 2011, after the Secret Pakistan went on-air, Gillani ordered the blocking out of the BBC World and banned the channel in the country. Banning of BBC World deeply concerned the BBC authorities and the BBC executives immediately met with Gillani to resolve the issue. The BBC World was restored after BBC world ordered a full-fledged investigation into the matter.

In 2011 state of the union address at the Parliament, Gilani spoke highly of culture, stating the historical cultural facts and values of cultural legacy of the country. His state of the union address came in response to American secret raid that killed Osama bin Laden in May 2011. Gillani also participated and celebrated the 60th anniversary of the bilateral relations between Pakistan and China. During the state visit of Wen Jiabao in 2010, Gillani and Wen proceeded to sign the cultural relations agreements after inaugurating the Pakistan-China Friendship Centre, a centre of excellence of promoting the cultural relations of China and Pakistan.

In 2012, Gilani lastly paid a state visit to the United Kingdom and met with British counterpart David Cameron which opened a new chapter in friendship when both the countries decided to transform their bilateral relationship into an "Enhanced Strategic Partnership", covering trade and commerce, economic development, defence and security, culture, education and health. At the press conference with the British counterpart, Gillani termed the Pakistan-UK relationship as unique, warm and cordial and said it was based on shared values, history, culture and strong people-to-people contact.

==== Role in Chief Justice restoration and Constitutional amendments ====
During the judicial crisis of March 2009, Gillani played swift but vital role in ending the serious judicial crises in the country and is widely given credit with playing a central role in convincing President Asif Ali Zardari to restore Chief Justice Iftikhar Muhammad Chaudhry. This, according to some analysts, has strengthened his role as Prime Minister.

Since 2008, his government and the Parliament has carried out major constitutional amendments intended to enhance and strengthen the parliamentary democracy in the country. In April 2010, the Parliament unanimously passed the XVIII Amendment which removed the presidential powers, limiting the role of presidency in the politics, and turned the political system of Pakistan from a semi-presidential to a parliamentary republic. In December 2010, the XIX and XX amendments were passed which gave more power, responsibilities and strengthened the position of the office of prime minister.

==== Intervention in Afghanistan war ====
Immediately after holding the office, a multi-pronged strategy for tribal areas and the war in Afghanistan was approved by Gilani after reviewing the progress on the war on terror and the law and order situation in Khyber Pakhtunkhwa. Prime Minister Gilani's upcoming and then-newly appointed principal military adviser, Chairman Joint Chiefs General Tariq Majid, presented and formalised a plan and strategy to tackle the insurgency with full military force. Terming as "tri-services framework", the chairman joint chiefs' meeting with the Prime minister, emphasised the role of inter-services to tackle the insurgency with full force, and "joint army-navy-air force efforts that are synergized within a framework of jointness and inter-operability to meet present and future challenges". After a year of careful study, General Majid's plan was submitted to Gillani who approved the new strategy, which followed the new order of battle and new deployments of combat units of joint army-navy-air force in the north-western region.

Unlike the predecessor Aziz government's deployment, Gilani redeployed fresh combatant units of unified Pakistan Armed Forces to take on the militants hiding in country's tribal areas. A full-scale inter-services' operation, codename Black Thunderstorm, took place in Swat in April 2009, which resulted in a complete success, followed by successful infiltration and dismantling of militancy in other areas of Tribal belt. A final unified operation was commenced in 2009 under codename, Rah-e-Nijat, which brought the areas inflicted of terrorism back in the government control.

In 2012, Gilani attempted to end the violence and bloodshed in Afghanistan after going to Qatar to meet the top Taliban leadership. Subsequently, Gilani discuss the representatives of Taliban and Qatari government to established an office there. Gillani also secured his place at the negotiations on Afghanistan's future.

=== Foreign relations ===
After resuming the office, Gillani's foreign policy greatly relaxed the relationships with the United Kingdom, despite British counterpart's "harsh" comments on country's role in the war on terror in 2010. The comments brought hostility between two countries, though Gilani reconciled the matter with the British counterpart. In 2011, British Prime Minister David Cameron visited Pakistan and called for "fresh start" in relations with Pakistan as he offered £650m in aid and better security co-operation. In May 2012, Gilani paid back the trip to United Kingdom and held frank discussion with British counterpart to boost military and strategic ties and to increase bilateral trade, economic growth and development, cultural co-operation, security and education. At the end of trip, Cameron and Gillani launched a Trade and Investment Framework to set out the steps both governments will take to promote investment, support business and achieve the target of increasing bilateral trade to $2.5 billion by 2015.

If we do not establish a regional harmony based on trade, investment and economic growth, we fear, we will remain hostage to the past. The 21st century is the "Asian century", and Asia's role in the global economic order has changed rapidly.....

— Gillani, speech on the Boao Forum for Asia in the view of the Asian unity

In 2012, he notably called for "Asian Unity" during the attending session of the Boao Forum for Asia in China. Gilani backed the reform and opening up and defended a new transit trade agreement with Afghanistan and declaration of most-favoured nation status for India. Gilani called for the united regional co-operation for building the gas pipelines and communication as factors that, in his view, alters the regional situation radically. In 2010, relations with Germany was improved and Gilani succeeded in ratifying the free-trade agreement and the investment treaty to increase the German direct investment in the country. In May 2011, Gillani paid a three-day state visit to France to hold discussion on security co-operation and economic partnership. Gallani met with Nicolas Sarkozy and signed agreement on co-operation on energy, telecommunication, infrastructure development, banking, environment, waste management and defence.

==== Afghanistan and India ====
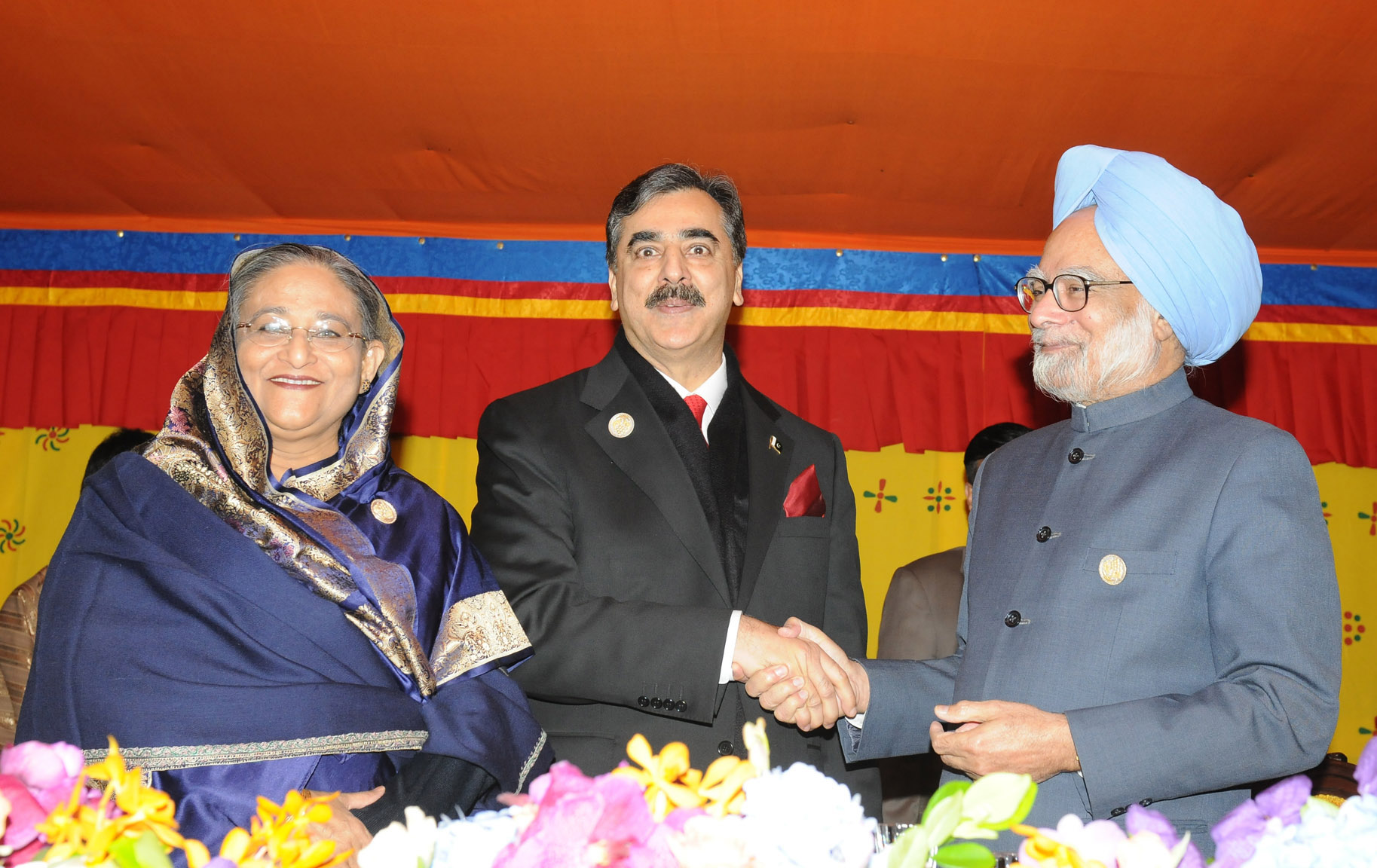
Gilani with Bangladeshi Prime Minister Sheikh Hasina (left) and Indian Prime Minister Manmohan Singh (right) in Thimphu, Bhutan; 2010

Since assuming office of the premier, Gillani was planning to visit neighbouring Afghanistan, but some unresolved issues like absence of a joint platform to discuss bilateral issues, border conflicts, and different views on the war on terror prevented the trip. Gillani visited Afghanistan with Chief of Army Staff General Ashfaq Pervez Kayani and ISI Director-General Lieutenant-General Ahmed Shuja Pasha. After successful dialogue, it was mutually decided to form a Reconciliation Committee headed by foreign ministers of both the countries.

On 22 December 2011, Gillani told an audience at the National Gallery that conspirators were plotting to bring down his government.

In his first year of Premiership, he tried to resolve diplomatic relations with India, after the 2008 Mumbai terror attack perpetrated by Pakistan based terrorist outfit Lashkar-e-Taiba nearly pushed the two countries to the war-like situation; Gillani promised to his counterpart to bring and punish perpetrators of this heinous attack to justice. In 2011, Indian Prime minister Manmohan Singh described Gillani as "Man of Peace".

==== United States and Russia ====
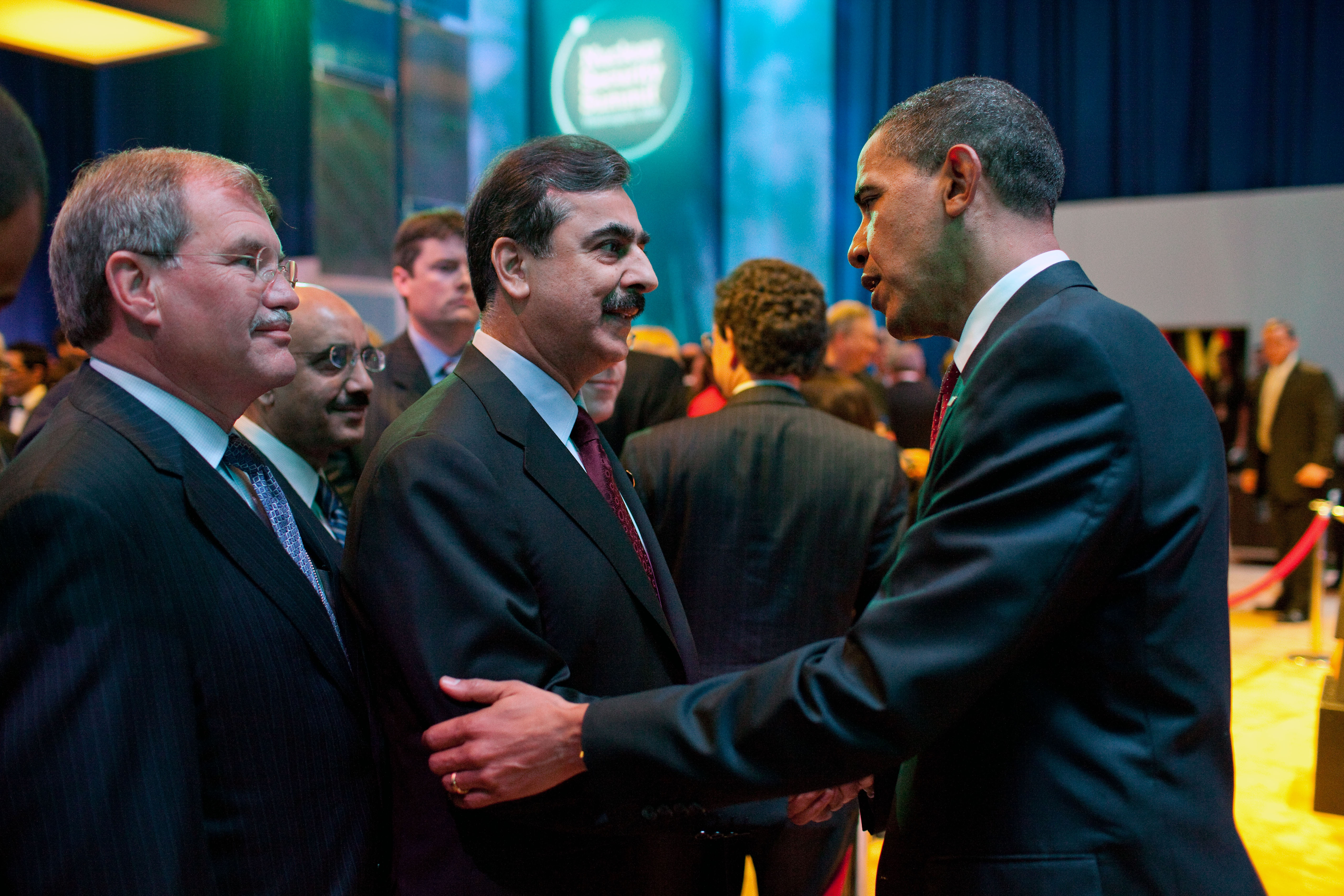
Gillani with U.S. President Barack Obama in Washington, D.C., 2010

Attempts were made to enhance diplomatic relations with the United States, however as the time passed, Gillani's relations with the United States became somewhat troubled, although United States maintained farewell relations with him. On multiple occasions, he countered the US pressure and backed the military efforts to curbed down the militancy in the region. After receiving heated criticism, Gilani repudiated the US claims that his country was falling short on fighting the war on terrorism. Gilani countered the claims on CNN and maintained that: "If there is any credible, actionable information, please share with us, because are already working with you; my ISI is working with the American CIA. What else do you want?".

The United States is into the election year and (President) Obama's decision has been aimed at gaining political mileage... President Barack Obama is using drone strikes in Pakistan tribal regions for political motives

— Yousaf Raza Gillani, 2012, Cited source

In 2011, the relations with United States suffered a major set back and resentment when the United States unilaterally conducted a secret offence (see: Neptune Spear) in Abbottabad, which resulted in successful execution of Usama Bin Laden. Immediately after learning the news, Gillani and President Zardari chaired a high-level meeting with the senior military leadership in Islamabad. Gillani reportedly announced that: "We will not allow our soil to be used against any other country for terrorism and therefore, I think it's a great victory, it's a success and I congratulate the success of this operation." Later Gilani blamed the world for their failure to capture bin Laden. The relationship between Pakistan and the United States fell to a new low following the Salala Incident, with his government and the elite Pakistani military establishment reassessing their diplomatic, political, military and intelligence relationship with the United States.

All major NATO supply lines were immediately closed leaving the blockaded supply trucks vulnerable to attacks. On 26 November 2011, Gillani's government ordered the US to shut down and vacate the PAF Base Shamsi in the southwestern Balochistan province within a deadline of 15 days. On 10 December, the troops from the Frontier Corps took full control of the air force base as scheduled, and by 11 December all remaining American staff were evacuated. Prime minister Yousuf Raza Gilani informed the cabinet that Pakistan was at a critical juncture in its relationship with the US and NATO and it was time to make some important decisions."Decisions regarding ties with the US and NATO will be made in the national interest." In December 2011, Gillani reportedly told the BBC interviewer that "his country does not trust the United States, and the feeling is mutual". Although, he did goaded that relations were important and maintained: "We are working together and still we don't trust each other... we should have more confidence in each other..".

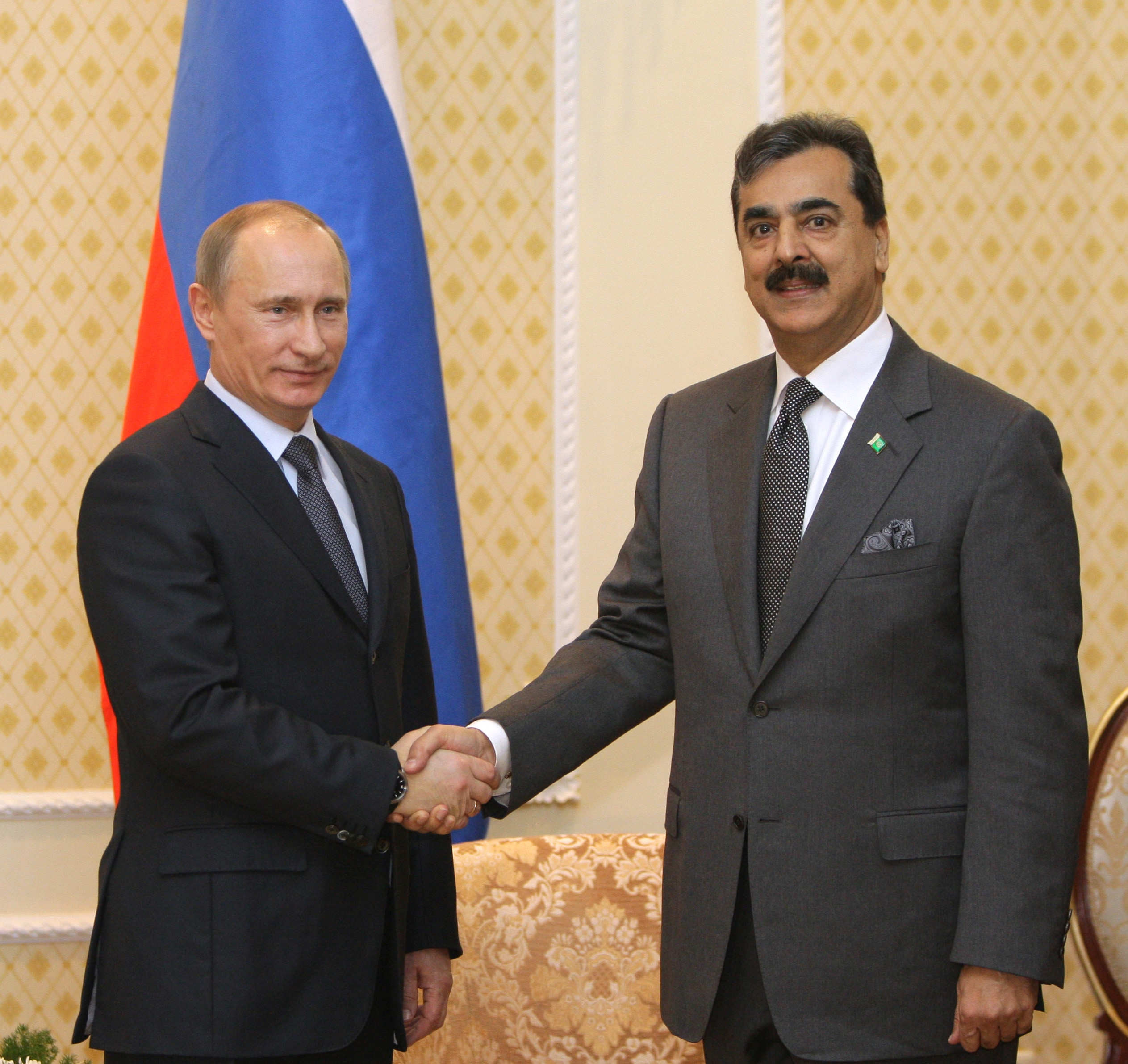
Gilani with Russian Prime Minister Vladimir Putin in Dushanbe, Tajikistan; 2010

The relations with Russia were pushed to level of intensity of bilateral relations, which he termed it as "New Momentum".

In 2011, Gillani and Russian Prime Vladimir Putin held a frank discussion in a cordial atmosphere on 10th Heads of Government meeting of the Shanghai Cooperation Organisation. Gilani successfully convinced Russia finance and invest in the large energy projects including Central Asia-South Asia 1000 (CASA-1000) to allow the international transition of the power generation from Turkmenistan, Tajikistan, and Kyrgyzstan to Pakistan. Russia has provided US$500 million for the CASA-1000 for the power transmission project. In 2011, both countries initiated the work on the framework n the proposed Free Trade Agreement and currency swap arrangement to boost bilateral trade and further strengthen their economic ties. On 4 March 2012, only few hours being re-elected, Gilani telephoned Putin and greeted him on his success in the election for the President of Russia, and quoted: "it was a testimony to the confidence the people of Russia had reposed in his leadership".

=== Legal challenges ===
==== Memogate, Mediagate scandals and subsequent conflicts ====
On 10 October 2011, US-based businessman Mansoor Ijaz wrote in an opinion piece in The Financial Times that he acted as an intermediary between the Pakistan Government and US administration, with the former requesting the help of the latter to avert a military coup in wake of the unilateral US raid that killed al-Qaeda leader, Osama bin Laden. He said that a senior Pakistan diplomat telephoned him with an urgent request early on 9 May, exactly a week after the raid against bin Laden.

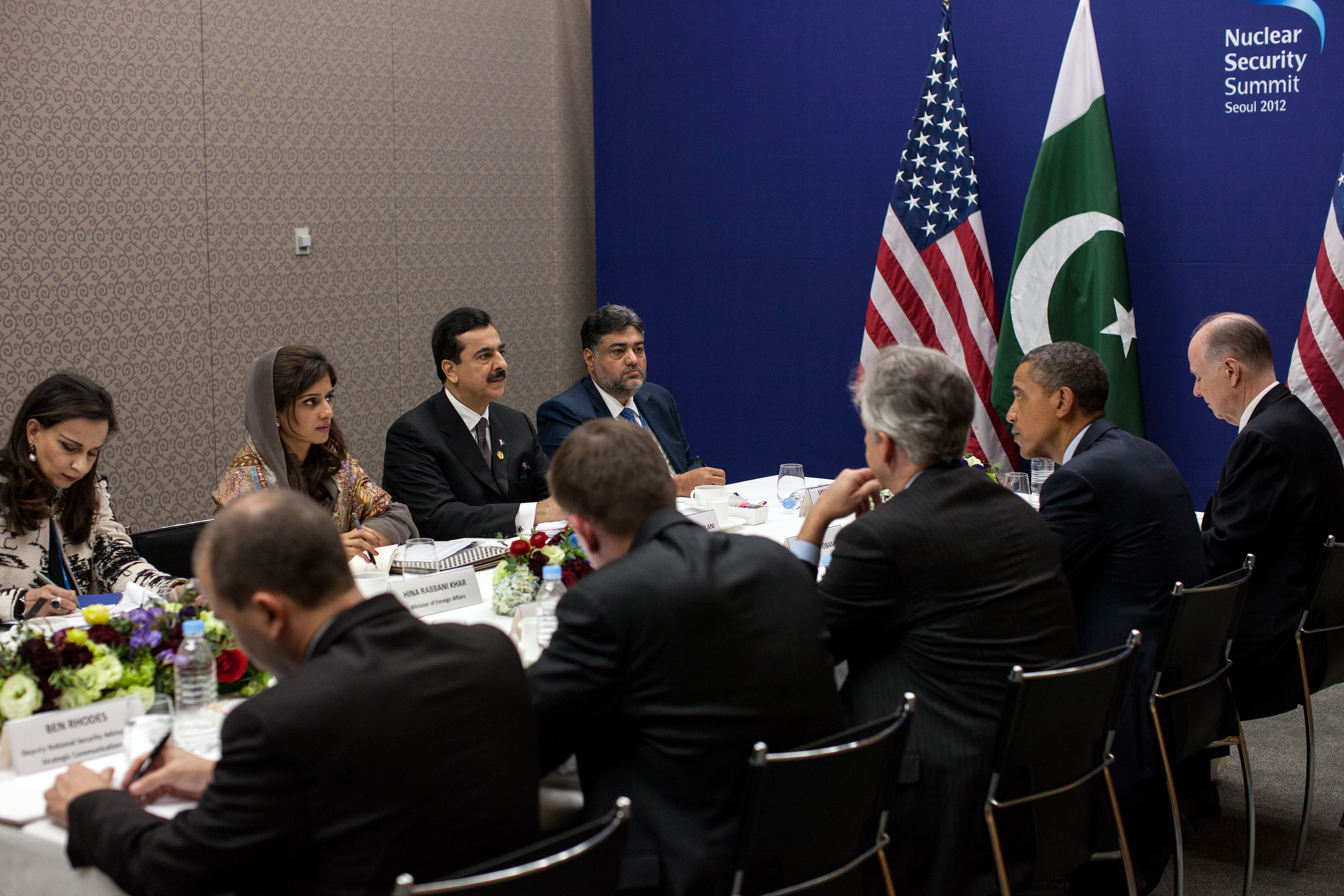
Prime Minister Gillani participates in a bilateral meeting with President Obama in Seoul, 2012.

Though the Pakistan Government subsequently rejected his claims, it triggered a storm in the country's political science circles, especially between the civil government and the military. A judicial commission was subsequently appointed to investigate the matter.

Meanwhile, Chairman joint chiefs Shameem Wynne's request to the supreme court for an independent probe into the matter was accepted. The court rejected the government's contention that the issue should be investigated by a parliamentary panel.

Tensions between the government and the military reached a peak after Gillani said the armed forces and the intelligence chiefs had acted in an "unconstitutional and illegal" manner by filing affidavits on the memo issue in the Supreme Court. The military reacted within days through a strongly worded statement that said the premier's remarks could have "grievous consequences".

Gillani retaliated by sacking Defence Secretary Lieutenant General (retired) Khalid Naeem Lodhi, a confidant of chief of army staff General Pervez Kiani. He reiterated that the Defence Secretary was removed in accordance with the law as he had made a mistake by not following the government's rules. He maintained that he was only answerable to the Parliament.

==== Disqualification petition ====
On 29 March 2012, a civilian resident of Johar Town Lahore, Tariq Ahmed, filed a court petition in the Lahore High Court, seeking to hear the case of disqualification of Yousaf Raza Gillani. The plea was filed in the High Court in which the petitioner took the stance that "Fauzia Gillani— spouse of Prime Minister Gillani received loans of millions of rupees from the Agriculture Development Bank Ltd (ADB) and the National Bank of Pakistan for the two mega-corporation owned by the Gillani family of which Fauzia Gillani served both megacorporation's executive director. None of the loans of millions of rupees were paid back to the banks.

The Constitution of Pakistan's Article 63(1)(n) and Article 63(1)(o) provide for a Member of Parliament's disqualification if he/she is a defaulter of a loan of more than PKR 2 million (63(1)(n)) or if his.her spouse or dependents have defaulted on payment of utility bills of more than PKR 10,000 (63(1)(o)). Petitioner pointed out that apart from that in the Statement of Assets and Liabilities (SAL) as of 2007 investment in shares by her spouse, ownership of inherited assets and house in the Defence Housing Authority, Lahore (DHA Lahore), have not been declared in their SAL submission list given to the Election Commission of Pakistan. The court after hearing the petitioner has asked the Deputy Attorney General to assist the Court on next hearing date 4 April 2012.

The disqualification petition was put to rest by the ruling of the Speaker of the National Assembly Dr. Fehmida Mirza, that the petition does not hold ground.

==== Conviction on charges of Contempt of Court ====
On 26 April 2012, Gillani was convicted on the charges of Contempt of Court, becoming Pakistan's first Prime Minister to be convicted while holding office. He was sentenced to be held in custody till the rising of court, a symbolic sentence lasting 30 seconds. The verdict was a short order and the full verdict of the court (over 70 pages) had been reserved, and was handed over after few days' time. Gillani's lawyer Aitzaz Ahsan announced that the Prime Minister shall file an appeal against the Supreme Court's verdict once the full verdict is handed over, despite opposition parties urgings. However, Gilani refused to step down.

On 28 May 2012, the issue of the disqualification of the Prime Minister was put to rest after a ruling by Speaker of the National Assembly Dr. Fehmida Mirza, not to send the disqualification reference to the Election Commission of Pakistan.

Subsequently, the Prime Minister and his legal team decided not to file a petition against the conviction. Talking to the media representatives, the Prime Minister maintained that he acted to defend the Constitution of Pakistan, which according to the Supreme Court amounted to contempt of court.

On 24 May 2012, the Peoples Party directed the case to speaker of the National Assembly to review the case of Gillani, in light of the apex court's verdict. The speaker ruled out that, despite being convict, Gillani cannot be disqualified from the provisions of the paragraph Article 63(g) or either Article 63(h) of the Constitution. Following her rulings, the speaker also decided not to forwarded the reference against Gillani's disqualification to Election Commission. On 29 May, Gillani appeared in media and vigorously defended speaker's decision and quoted: "..(...) The National Assembly Speaker Dr. Fehmida Mirza's ruling pertaining to the disqualification reference was final and could not be challenged...()...".

===== Necklace Scandal =====
In 2015, Gilani was ordered to return a necklace that had been donated by the Turkish First Lady for the victims of the 2010 floods in Pakistan. The Gilanis had held on to it and kept it after being ousted from premiership.

===== Vote Buying in Senate Elections =====
In 2021, a video emerged of Gilani's son offering cash for votes in Pakistan's Senate Elections. The ruling party at the time tried but failed to get the Election Commission to investigate the matter.

==== Disqualification and ouster ====
After the Speaker's ruling was made public, the major opposition party in the parliament, the Pakistan Muslim League, and the non-elected party, the Pakistan Tehreek-e-Insaaf (PTI), filed two separate petition in the supreme court, challenging the National Assembly Speaker Dr. Fehmida Mirza's ruling to save Prime Minister Yousuf Raza Gilani from disqualification. The petitioners pointed out that Article 184(3) of the Constitution stands to "disqualified in light of the apex court's verdict and that he should be barred from performing further duties as the prime minister."

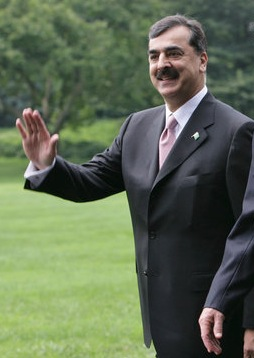
Gillani speaking to reporters in a 2008 state visit to the United States.

On 6 June 2012, the Supreme Court admitted the petitions and a three-member bench was formed to be headed by Chief Justice Iftikhar Mohammad Chaudhry to hear the petitions. After hearing petitions by both sides, the notices were sent to prime minister, speaker of the national assembly, and other concerned offices to the case. The hearing of the petitions was subsequently adjourned to 14 June 2012. On 15 June, Gillani's lawyer senator Aitzaz Ahsan defended speaker's move, and argued that "the office of speaker was no more 'a post office' after the 18th Amendment as it had been drastically changed" and that "[the speaker] had used her quasi judicial powers and gave her ruling over the issue with due application of her mind". Ahsan maintained that the prime minister had accepted the conviction but not disqualification. On 17 June, Ahsan concluded that speaker's ruling was in accordance with parliamentary ethics and reiterated that the ruling in the contempt of court case did not refer to a disqualification of the prime minister. Mirza also submitted the written statement in which, she maintained that the court's ruling did not order that a reference on the issue should directly be sent to the Election Commission, and has had the constitutional authority to decide over the disqualification of a member of the assembly. Her written statement was discarded by the supreme court, and reserved the final decision of Gillani's qualification matter. At the end of the proceedings, the chief justice marked that the petitions had stated that a "convicted person" was representing the people; the prime minister represented the public and not a party. Minutes before adjourning the court, the chief justice quoted: "The fate of the people was in the hands of a man who had been convicted by the Supreme Court... (...)..".

Finally on 19 June 2012, the Supreme Court of Pakistan ousted and further disqualified Prime Minister Gillani citing the earlier conviction on 26 April 2012. The Supreme Court in its standing orders, said that "Gillani was ineligible to hold the Prime Minister's office after April 26th conviction" and all orders given by him till date would stand null and void. Consequently, the Election Commission issued the government notification with regards to the disqualification of Gillani. The country's election commission noted that, accepting the rulings of Supreme Court, Gillani was disqualified as a member of parliament with effect immediately from 26 April 2012.

=== Post premiership ===
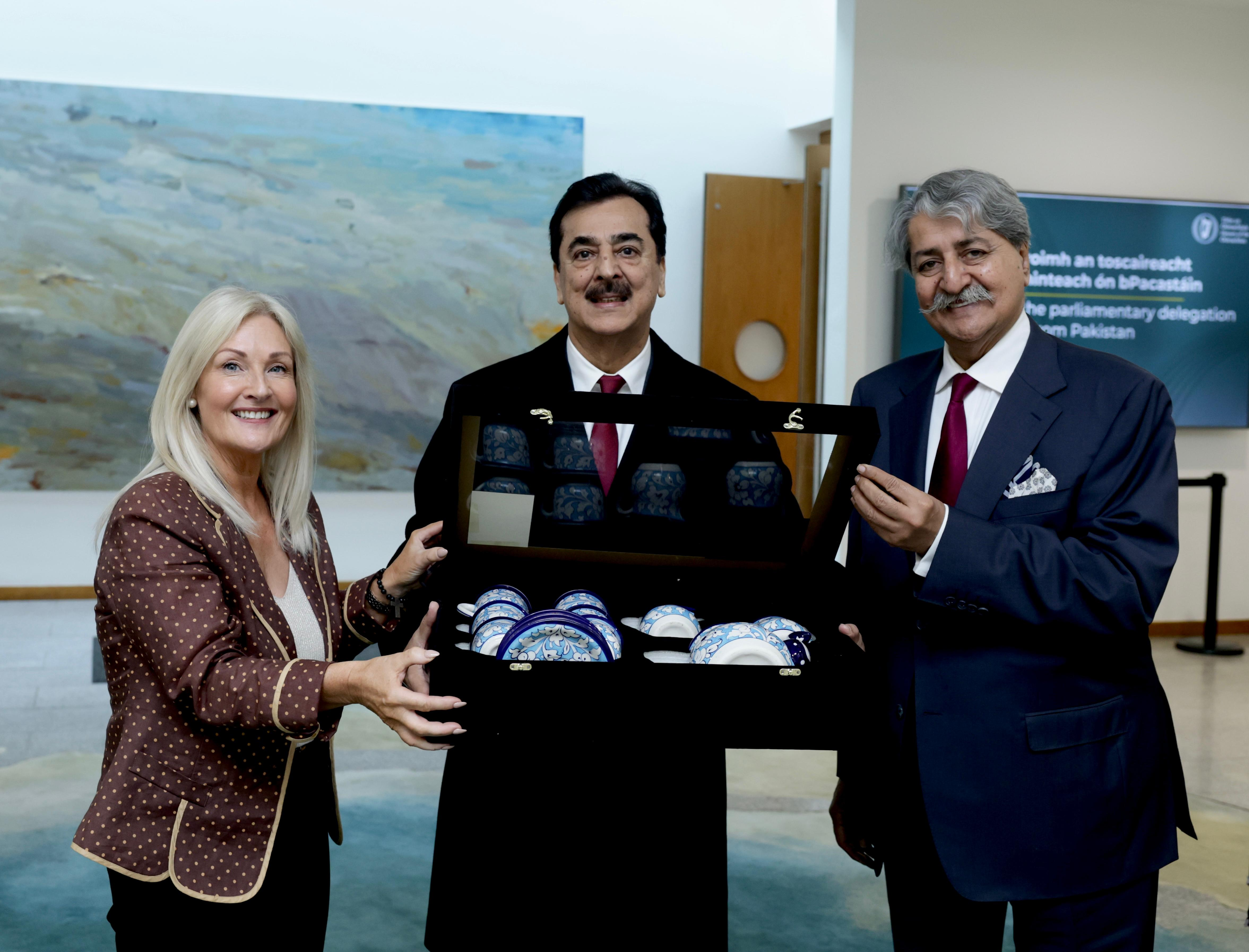
Gillani as Chairman of the Senate, visits Leinster House in January 2025.

His disqualification term was ended in April 2017 and the Supreme Court allowed him to contest in the 2018 Pakistani general election.

He was PPP's candidate for Islamabad's general seat in the 2021 Senate Elections. He defeated the incumbent government's candidate Minister of Finance Dr. Abdul Hafeez Shaikh in a major upset victory, prompting the incumbent PM Imran Khan to take a vote of confidence from the National Assembly.

On 12 March 2021, he contested for the chairmanship of the Senate of Pakistan and lost to his rival Sadiq Sanjrani. Gilani received 42 votes, compared to his rival who received 48 votes. 7 votes were rejected.

In 2024, Gilani was elected unopposed as the Chairman of the Senate. Gilani was re-elected on 14 March 2024 after receiving 204 votes and currently is a Senator of the Senate of Pakistan.

Chairman Gilani served as the acting-President of Pakistan from 20 May 2024 till 30 May 2024, from 10 October 2024 till 11 October 2024, from 30 October 2024 till 9 November 2024, from 4 February 2025 till 8 February 2025, from 9 February 2025 till 12 February 2025, from 13 March 2025 till 16 March 2025, from 12 September 2025 till 21 September 2025, from 27 September 2025 till 4 October 2025, 3 November 2025 till 6 November 2025, from 20 December 2025 till 24 December 2025, from 13 January 2026 till 16 January 2026, from 26 January 2026 till 29 January 2026, from 25 April 2026 till 1 May 2026, from 6 July 2026 till 9 July 2026 and then again from 30 August 2026 till 10 September 2026 and then again from 22 October 2026 till 25 October 2026, this was during periods the President of Pakistan Asif Ali Zardari remained abroad.

== Assessment and legacy ==
Gilani was Prime Minister of Pakistan longer than any other person except Liaquat Ali Khan in a single term. His tenure also witnessed what has been described as a "clash of state institutions, involving the government (executive), the armed forces and the judiciary." Gillani is prudently criticised for the prolonged Era of Stagflation, in which fundamental economic problems were ignored, corruption, government mismanagement, and issues involving the law enforcement. Failure of the grand paramilitary operation in Karachi further damaged Gilani's position in the public circles. During Pervez Ashraf's tenure as leader, there was an increase in criticism of the Gillanian years, even after the NRO squabble was eventually resolved in the government headed by Pervez Ashraf.

A consistently strong US ally as prime minister, Gillani was ranked as the 38th most powerful person in the world by Forbes. After years of confronting and resisting the Supreme Court of Pakistan rulings to reinstate the corruption cases against Benazir and Asif Zardari, he was convicted by the Supreme Court of violating Article 63(1)(g) of the Constitution of Pakistan, on 26 April 2012. The verdict was rendered by the Supreme Court when it found him the guilty of contempt of court for refusing to reopen corruption cases against president Asif Ali Zardari, but it gave him only a symbolic sentence "till the rising of the court", a sentence lasting 30 seconds. However, this 30-second sentence was a legal conviction, enough to unseat from office. On 19 June 2012, he was disqualified and ousted by the same Supreme Court from holding the prime minister's office, with the Chief Justice Iftikhar Chaudhry clarifying that: "Gillani had ceased to be [the] prime minister and (is) disqualified from membership of parliament on 26 April 2012, the date of his conviction".

In the wake of the 2008 general elections, his party formed a four-party coalition alliance and nominated him for the office of Prime Minister. He is the first prime minister that holds the distinction (thus far, the only prime minister to have achieved this milestone) for successfully presenting five consecutive federal budgets. As Prime Minister, Gillani announced the formation of the Truth and Reconciliation Commission, rehabilitation of the troubled and war-torn tribal belt, and promised to reduce the federal budget deficit as well as announcing his ambitions to improve the system of education. This was followed by announcing the new agriculture, land and economic policy that lifted the bans on labour and students' unions, while he worked on and implemented the new energy and nuclear policies to tackle the energy crisis in the country. But his policies, without meaningful economic reforms, led to a high rise in inflation and sharp decline in economic performance, a period referred to as the "Era of Stagflation".

== In popular culture ==
In The Accidental Prime Minister, a 2019 film about Indian prime minister Manmohan Singh, Gilani is portrayed by actor Adarsh Gautam.

== Books ==
- Chah-e-Yusaf se Sada [Reflections from Yusuf's Well]/ چاہ یوسف سے صدا, Lahore : Nigarshat, 2006, 275 p. Autobiography he wrote while in jail.

== Notes ==
Political offices
Preceded by Gohar Ayub Khan	Speaker of the National Assembly; 1993–1997	Succeeded by Elahi Bux Soomro
Preceded by Muhammad Mian Soomro	Prime Minister of Pakistan; 2008–2012	Succeeded by Raja Pervaiz Ashraf
Preceded by Sadiq Sanjrani	Chairman of the Senate of Pakistan; 2024–present	Incumbent
