= Muhammad Jahanzaib Khan Khichi =

Pakistani politician

Provincial Minister of Punjab for Transport
- In office 13 September 2018 – April 2022

Member of the Provincial Assembly of the Punjab
- In office 15 August 2018 – 14 January 2023
- Constituency: PP-236 Vehari-VIII
- In office February 2013 – 31 May 2018
- Constituency: PP-239 (Vehari-VIII)

Personal details
- Born: Lahore, Punjab, Pakistan
- Party: PTI (2013-present)

Muhammad Jahanzaib Khan Khichi is a Pakistani politician who was the Provincial Minister of Punjab for Transport, in office from 13 September 2018 till April 2022. He had been a member of the Provincial Assembly of the Punjab from August 2018 till January 2023.

Previously he was a member of the Provincial Assembly of the Punjab from February 2013 to May 2018.

== Early life and education ==
He was born on 7 January 1973 in Lahore to a Muslim Rajput family.

He received intermediate level education.

== Political career ==
He was elected to the Provincial Assembly of the Punjab as a candidate of the Pakistan Tehreek-e-Insaf (PTI) from PP-239 (Vehari-VIII) in a February 2013 by-election. He received 35,478 votes and defeated a candidate of the Pakistan Peoples Party (PPP).

He was re-elected to the Provincial Assembly of the Punjab as a candidate of the PTI from PP-239 (Vehari-VIII) in the 2013 Punjab provincial election.

He was re-elected to Provincial Assembly of the Punjab as a candidate of the PTI from PP-236 (Vehari-VIII) in the 2018 Punjab provincial election.

On 12 September 2018, he was inducted into the provincial Punjab cabinet of Chief Minister Usman Buzdar. On 13 September 2018, he was appointed Provincial Minister of Punjab for Transport. He ran for a seat in the Provincial Assembly from PP-235 Vehari-VII as a candidate of the PTI in the 2024 Punjab provincial election.
