= PP-236 Vehari-VIII =

Constituency of the Punjabi Provincial Legislature, Pakistan

- Constituency for the Provincial Assembly of Punjab
- Region: Mailsi Tehsil (partly) including Tibba Sultanpur town of Vehari District

Current constituency
- Created from: PP-238 Vehari-VII (2002-2018); PP-235 Vehari-VII (2018-2023)

PP-236 Vehari-VIII (پی پی-236، وہاڑی-8) is a Constituency of Provincial Assembly of Punjab.

== General elections 2024 ==
Provincial election 2024: PP-236 Vehari-VIII
Party	Candidate	Votes	%	±%
Independent	Muhammad Ali Raza Khan Khakwani (Note: Filed nomination papers as PTI candidate but ECP allowed him to run as an Independent)	61,443	43.37	
PML(N)	Asif Saeed	54,423	38.41	
PPP	Ali Raza Khan	8,463	5.97	
TLP	Safdar Abbas Khan	7,148	5.05	
Independent	Asif Ali	3,327	2.35	
Others	Others (fifteen candidates)	6,881	4.85	
Turnout		144,412	57.41	
Total valid votes		141,685	98.11	
Rejected ballots		2,727	1.89	
Majority		7,020	4.96	
Registered electors		251,547		
hold				

== General elections 2018 ==
Provincial election 2018: PP-235 Vehari-VII
Party	Candidate	Votes	%	±%
PTI	Muhammad Ali Raza Khan Khakwani	49,759	44.25	
PML(N)	Asif Saeed Manais	43,863	39.01	
Independent	Ch. Ghazanfar Abbas Ghallo	7,629	6.79	
TLP	Muhammad Rizwan Hussain	4,072	3.62	
PPP	Ali Raza Khan	3,091	2.75	
ARP	Safdar Abbas Khan	1,700	1.51	
Others	Others (six candidates)	2,334	2.08	
Turnout		114,310	58.96	
Total valid votes		112,448	98.37	
Rejected ballots		1,862	1.63	
Majority		5,896	5.24	
Registered electors		193,879		

== General elections 2013 ==
Provincial election 2013: PP-238 Vehari-VII
Party	Candidate	Votes	%	±%
PML(N)	Asif Saeed Manais	46,474	46.69	
PTI	Muhammad Ali Raza Khan Khakwani	29,223	29.36	
Independent	Ch. Ghazanfar Abbas Ghallo	16,039	16.11	
JI	Safdar Abbas Khan Manais	3,264	3.28	
Independent	Mian Shehzad Sajjad Sandhal	1,124	1.13	
PPP	Azhar Hussain Khan Khakwani	1,033	1.04	
Others	Others (nine candidates)	2,386	2.40	
Turnout		102,885	65.03	
Total valid votes		99,543	96.75	
Rejected ballots		3,342	3.25	
Majority		17,251	17.33	
Registered electors		158,206		

== General elections 2008 ==
Contesting candidates	Party affiliation	Votes polled

== See also ==
- PP-235 Vehari-VII
- PP-237 Bahawalnagar-I
