= PP-235 Vehari-VII =

Constituency of the Punjabi Provincial Legislature, Pakistan

- Constituency for the Provincial Assembly of Punjab
- Region: Mailsi Tehsil (partly) including Mailsi city and Jallah Jeem town of Vehari District

Current constituency
- Created from: PP-239 Vehari-VIII (2002-2018); PP-236 Vehari-VIII (2018-2023)

PP-235 Vehari-VII (پی پی-235، وہاڑی-7) is a Constituency of Provincial Assembly of Punjab.

== General elections 2024 ==
Provincial election 2024: PP-235 Vehari-VII
| Party | Candidate | Votes | % | ±% |
|---|---|---|---|---|
| Independent | Muhammad Jahanzaib Khan Khichi (Note: Filed nomination papers as PTI candidate but ECP allowed him to run as an Independent) | 50,289 | 41.17 | |
| PML(N) | Mian Khaliq Nawaz | 39,585 | 32.41 | |
| PPP | Naeem Ahmed Khan | 17,500 | 14.33 | |
| TLP | Mumtaz Ahmad | 6,350 | 5.20 | |
| JUI (F) | Muhammad Shafique | 5,389 | 4.41 | |
| Others | Others (eleven candidates) | 3,040 | 2.48 | |
| Turnout | | 124,812 | 52.39 | |
| Total valid votes | | 122,153 | 97.87 | |
| Rejected ballots | | 2,659 | 2.13 | |
| Majority | | 10,704 | 8.76 | |
| Registered electors | | 238,259 | | |
| hold | | | | |

== General elections 2018 ==
Provincial election 2018: PP-236 Vehari-VIII
| Party | Candidate | Votes | % | ±% |
|---|---|---|---|---|
| PTI | Muhammad Jahanzaib Khan Khichi | 38,033 | 37.48 | |
| PML(N) | Azhar Ahmad Khan Yousafzai | 20,490 | 20.19 | |
| Independent | Mian Khaliq Nawaz | 14,884 | 14.67 | |
| PPP | Abdullah Hayat Khan | 10,482 | 10.33 | |
| Independent | Rao Muhammad Ishaq Khan | 5,032 | 4.96 | |
| AAT | Muhammad Imran Khan | 3,829 | 3.77 | |
| TLP | Rao Dil Nawaz | 3,515 | 3.46 | |
| Independent | Mian Basit Nawaz | 1,756 | 1.73 | |
| Independent | Ahmad Yar | 1,508 | 1.49 | |
| Others | Others (six candidates) | 1,953 | 1.93 | |
| Turnout | | 103,811 | 53.87 | |
| Total valid votes | | 101,482 | 97.76 | |
| Rejected ballots | | 2,329 | 2.24 | |
| Majority | | 17,543 | 17.29 | |
| Registered electors | | 192,702 | | |

== General elections 2013 ==
Provincial election 2013: PP-239 Vehari-VIII
| Party | Candidate | Votes | % | ±% |
|---|---|---|---|---|
| PTI | Muhammad Jahanzaib Khan Khichi | 37,020 | 37.78 | |
| PML(N) | Mian Majid Nawaz | 31,354 | 32.00 | |
| PPP | Khan Abdul Qadir Khan Khichi | 14,625 | 14.92 | |
| Independent | Haji Ahmad Yar Achar Wala | 7,426 | 7.58 | |
| Independent | Dr. Muhammad Naseem Khan Khichi | 4,511 | 4.60 | |
| Others | Others (eleven candidates) | 3,055 | 3.12 | |
| Turnout | | 100,521 | 62.14 | |
| Total valid votes | | 97,991 | 97.48 | |
| Rejected ballots | | 2,530 | 2.52 | |
| Majority | | 5,666 | 5.78 | |
| Registered electors | | 161,777 | | |

== General elections 2008 ==
| Contesting candidates | Party affiliation | Votes polled |

== See also ==
- PP-234 Vehari-VI
- PP-236 Vehari-VIII
