= Magi =

Priests in Zoroastrianism

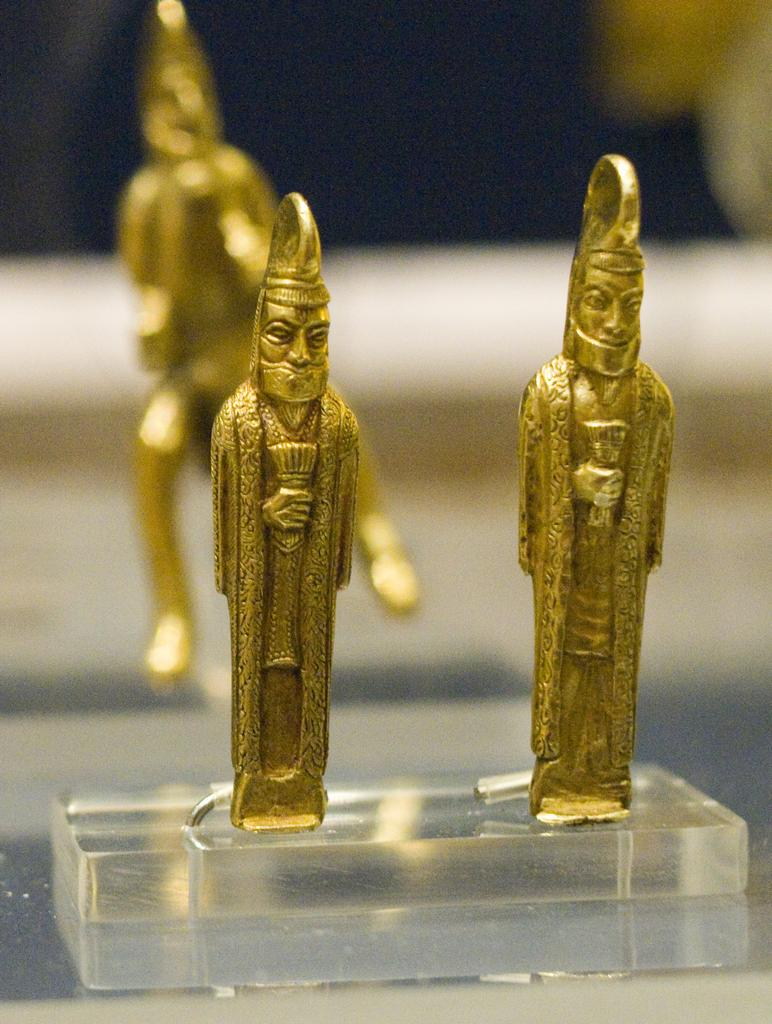
Zoroastrian priests (Magi) carrying barsoms. Statuettes from the Oxus Treasure of the Achaemenid Empire, 4th century BC

Magi (plur), (Note: /ˈmeɪdʒaɪ/) or magus (sing), (Note: /ˈmeɪɡəs/ (Latin: magus; from Ancient Greek: μᾰ́γος and Old Persian: 𐎶𐎦𐎢𐏁 maguš)) is the term for priests in Zoroastrianism and earlier Iranian religions. The earliest known use of the word magi is in the trilingual inscription written by Darius the Great, known as the Behistun Inscription. Old Persian texts refer to a magus as a Zurvanic, and presumably Zoroastrian, priest.

Pervasive throughout the Eastern Mediterranean and West Asia until late antiquity and beyond, mágos (μάγος) was influenced by (and eventually displaced) Greek goēs (γόης), the older word for a practitioner of magic, with a meaning expanded to include astronomy, astrology, alchemy, and other forms of esoteric knowledge. This association was in turn the product of the Hellenistic fascination for Pseudo-Zoroaster, who was perceived by the Greeks to be the Chaldean founder of the Magi and inventor of both astrology and magic, a meaning that still survives in the modern-day words "magic" and "magician".

In the Gospel of Matthew, "μάγοι" (magoi) from the east pay homage to the Christ Child, and the transliterated plural "magi" entered English from Latin in this context around 1200 AD (this particular use is also commonly rendered in English as "kings" and more often in recent times as "wise men"). The singular "magus" appears considerably later, when it was borrowed from Old French in the late 14th century with the meaning magician.

Hereditary Zoroastrian priesthood has survived in India and Iran. They are termed Herbad, Mobad (Magupat, i.e. chief of the Maga), and Dastur depending on the rank.

== History ==
=== Iranian sources ===
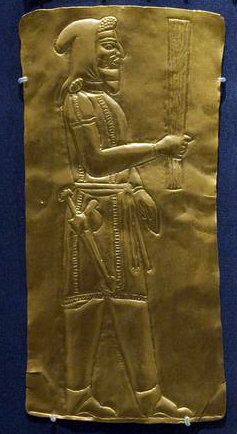
Zoroastrian Magus carrying barsom from the Oxus Treasure of the Achaemenid Empire, 4th century BC

The term only appears twice in Iranian texts from before the 5th century BC, and only one of these can be dated with precision. This one instance occurs in the trilingual Behistun inscription of Darius the Great, and which can be dated to about 520 BC. In this trilingual text, certain rebels have magian as an attribute; in the Old Persian portion as maγu- (generally assumed to be a loanword from Median). The meaning of the term in this context is uncertain.

The other instance appears in the texts of the Avesta, the sacred literature of Zoroastrianism. In this instance, which is in the Younger Avestan portion, the term appears in the hapax moghu.tbiš, meaning "hostile to the moghu", where moghu does not (as was previously thought) mean "magus", but rather "a member of the tribe" or referred to a particular social class in the proto-Iranian language and then continued to do so in Avestan.

An unrelated term, but previously assumed to be related, appears in the older Gathic Avestan language texts. This word, adjectival magavan meaning "possessing maga-", was once the premise that Avestan maga- and Median (i.e. Old Persian) magu- were coeval (and also that both these were cognates of Vedic Sanskrit magha-). While "in the Gathas the word seems to mean both the teaching of Zoroaster and the community that accepted that teaching", and it seems that Avestan maga- is related to Sanskrit magha-, "there is no reason to suppose that the western Iranian form magu (Magus) has exactly the same meaning" as well. But it "may be, however", that Avestan moghu (which is not the same as Avestan maga-) "and Medean magu were the same word in origin, a common Iranian term for 'member of the tribe' having developed among the Medes the special sense of 'member of the (priestly) tribe', hence a priest."^{cf}

Some examples of the use of magi in Persian poetry, are present in the poems of Hafez. There are two frequent terms used by him, first one is Peer-e Moghan (literally "the old man of the magi") and second one is Deyr-e Moghan (literally "the monastery of the magi").

=== Greco-Roman sources ===
==== Hellenistic period ====
The oldest surviving Greek reference to the magi – from Greek μάγος (mágos, plural: magoi) – could be from 6th century BC Heraclitus (apud Clemens Protrepticus 2.22.2), who cursed the magi for their "impious" rites and rituals. A description of the rituals that Heraclitus refers to has not survived, and there is nothing to suggest that Heraclitus was referring to foreigners.

Better preserved are the descriptions of the mid-5th century BC Herodotus, who in his portrayal of the Iranian expatriates living in Asia Minor uses the term "magi" in two different senses. In the first sense (Histories 1.101), Herodotus speaks of the magi as one of the tribes/peoples (ethnous) of the Medes. In another sense (1.132), Herodotus uses the term "magi" to generically refer to a "sacerdotal caste", but "whose ethnic origin is never again so much as mentioned." According to Robert Charles Zaehner, in other accounts :

"We hear of Magi not only in Persia, Parthia, Bactria, Chorasmia, Aria, Media, and among the Sakas, but also in non-Iranian lands like Arabia, Ethiopia, and Egypt. Their influence was also widespread throughout Asia Minor. It is, therefore, quite likely that the sacerdotal caste of the Magi was distinct from the Median tribe of the same name."

As early as the 5th century BC, Greek magos had spawned mageia and magike to describe the activity of a magus, that is, it was his or her art and practice. But almost from the outset the noun for the action and the noun for the actor parted company. Thereafter, mageia was used not for what actual magi did, but for something related to the word 'magic' in the modern sense, i.e. using supernatural means to achieve an effect in the natural world, or the appearance of achieving these effects through trickery or sleight of hand. The early Greek texts typically have the pejorative meaning, which in turn influenced the meaning of magos to denote a conjurer and a charlatan. Already in the mid-5th century BC, Herodotus identifies the magi as interpreters of omens and dreams (Histories 7.19, 7.37, 1.107, 1.108, 1.120, 1.128).

Other Greek sources from before the Hellenistic period include the gentleman-soldier Xenophon, who had first-hand experience at the Persian Achaemenid court. In his early 4th century BC Cyropaedia, Xenophon depicts the magians as authorities for all religious matters (8.3.11), and imagines the magians to be responsible for the education of the emperor-to-be. Apuleius, a Numidian Platonist philosopher, describes magus to be considered as a "sage and philosopher-king" based on its Platonic notion.

==== Roman period ====
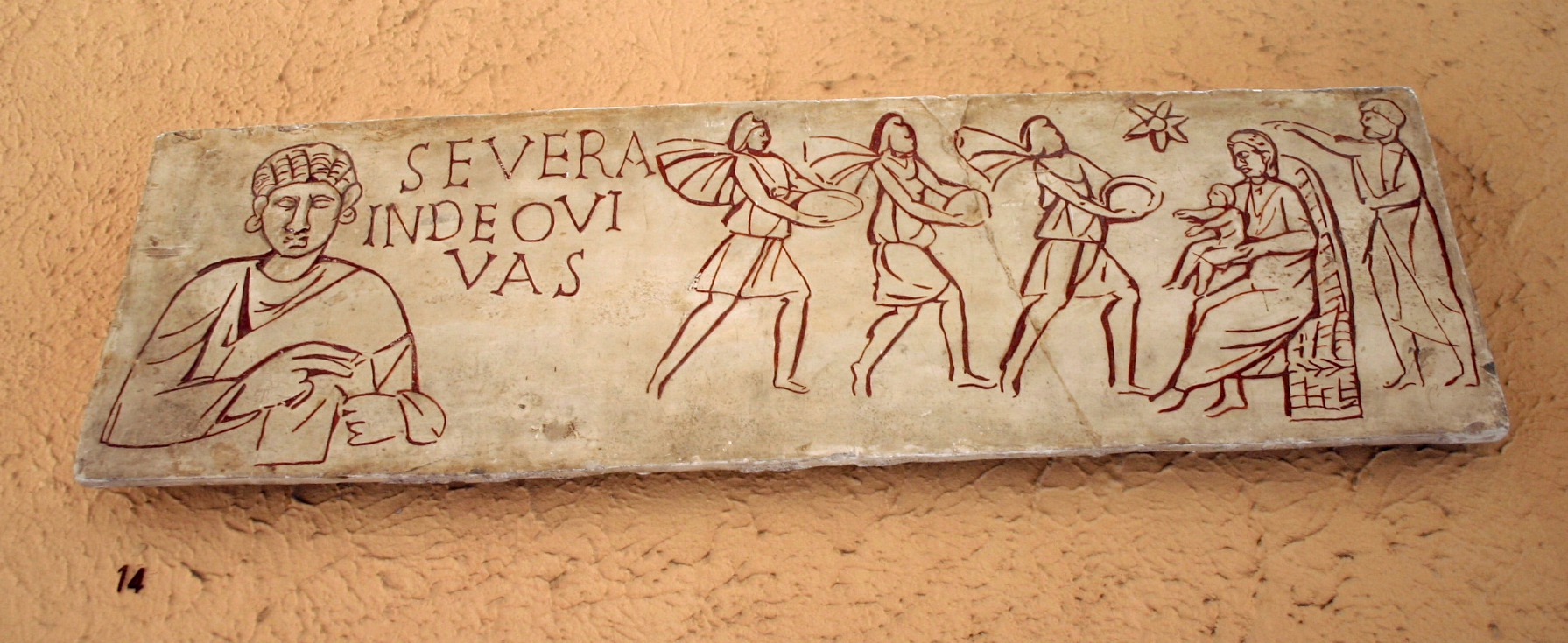
Incised sarcophagus slab with the Adoration of the Magi from the Catacombs of Rome, 3rd century

Once the magi had been associated with "magic" – Greek magikos – it was but a natural progression that the Greeks' image of Zoroaster would metamorphose into a magician too. The first century Pliny the Elder names "Zoroaster" as the inventor of magic (Natural History xxx.2.3), but a "principle of the division of labor appears to have spared Zoroaster most of the responsibility for introducing the dark arts to the Greek and Roman worlds. That dubious honor went to another fabulous magus, Ostanes, to whom most of the pseudepigraphic magical literature was attributed." For Pliny, this magic was a "monstrous craft" that gave the Greeks not only a "lust" (aviditatem) for magic, but a downright "madness" (rabiem) for it, and Pliny supposed that Greek philosophers – among them Pythagoras, Empedocles, Democritus, and Plato – traveled abroad to study it, and then returned to teach it (xxx.2.8–10).

"Zoroaster" – or rather what the Greeks supposed him to be – was for the Hellenists the figurehead of the 'magi', and the founder of that order (or what the Greeks considered to be an order). He was further projected as the author of a vast compendium of "Zoroastrian" pseudepigrapha, composed in the main to discredit the texts of rivals. "The Greeks considered the best wisdom to be exotic wisdom" and "what better and more convenient authority than the distant – temporally and geographically – Zoroaster?" The subject of these texts, the authenticity of which was rarely challenged, ranged from treatises on nature to ones on necromancy. But the bulk of these texts dealt with astronomical speculations and magical lore.

One factor for the association with astrology was Zoroaster's name, or rather, what the Greeks made of it. His name was identified at first with star-worshiping (astrothytes "star sacrificer") and, with the Zo-, even as the living star. Later, an even more elaborate mytho-etymology evolved: Zoroaster died by the living (zo-) flux (-ro-) of fire from the star (-astr-) which he himself had invoked, and even that the stars killed him in revenge for having been restrained by him. The second, and "more serious" factor for the association with astrology was the notion that Zoroaster was a Chaldean. The alternate Greek name for Zoroaster was Zaratas / Zaradas / Zaratos (cf. Agathias 2.23–25, Clement Stromata I.15), which – according to Bidez and Cumont – derived from a Semitic form of his name. The Suda's chapter on astronomia notes that the Babylonians learned their astrology from Zoroaster. Lucian of Samosata (Mennipus 6) decides to journey to Babylon "to ask one of the magi, Zoroaster's disciples and successors", for their opinion.

=== Use for non-Zoroastrians ===
According to Albert de Jong, the Greeks began applying magos to non-Persians at an early stage, and some Greeks later used it of themselves. In Christian literature the term could be negative, as with Simon Magus, or positive, as with the magi of the Gospel of Matthew.

According to the Encyclopædia Britannica, the Syriac form of the word was applied from the 1st century AD to magicians and soothsayers, chiefly from Babylonia. A distinction was kept between Persian magi, who were credited with deep religious knowledge, and Babylonian magi, who were often regarded as impostors. A study of Syriac hagiography describes "magician" as a polysemic term which refers to those who profess a condemned doctrine, a sorcerer and possibly a physician.

Arabic majus was first used of Zoroastrians and was later extended by Muslim writers to other non-Muslims regarded as pagans. In the west, it was applied to the pagan Scandinavians, who were believed to be fire-worshippers, including the Vikings who raided the Iberian Peninsula from 844.

== Religious traditions ==
=== Abrahamic ===
==== Judaism ====
In the Talmud, instances of dialogue between the Jewish sages and various magi are recorded. The Talmud depicts the Magi as sorcerers and in several descriptions, they are negatively described as obstructing Jewish religious practices. Several references include the sages criticizing practices performed by various magi. One instance is a description of the Zoroastrian priests exhuming corpses for their burial practices which directly interfered with the Jewish burial rites. Another instance is a sage forbidding learning from the magi.

==== Christianity ====
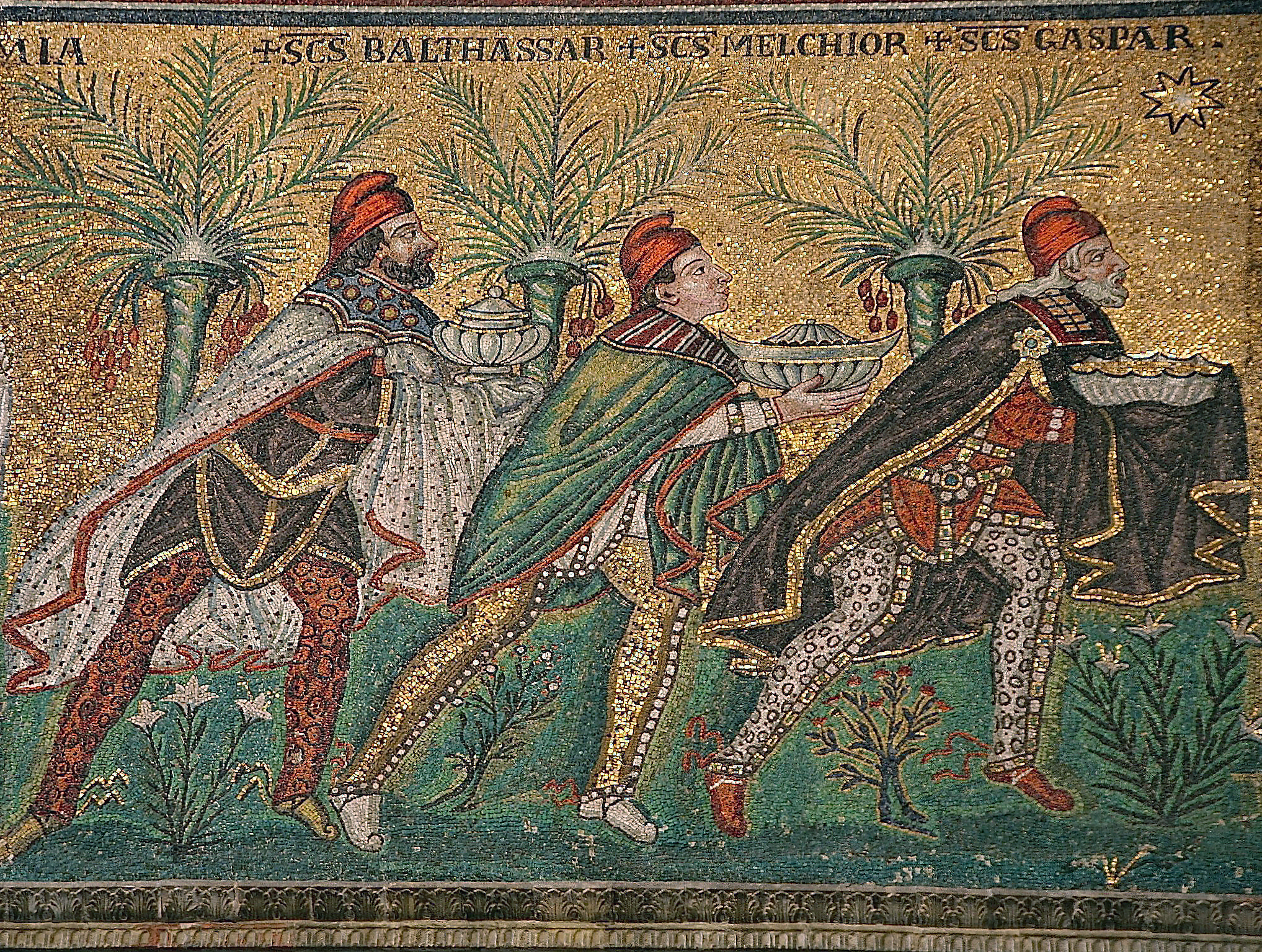
Byzantine depiction of the Three Magi in a 6th-century mosaic at Basilica of Sant'Apollinare Nuovo

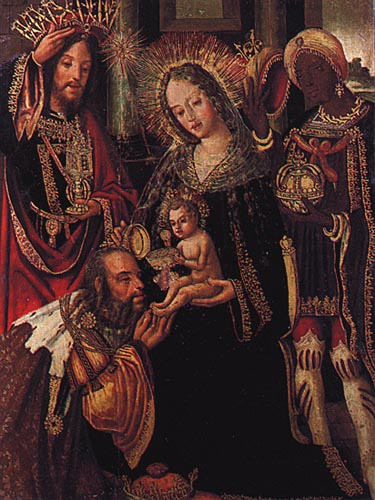
Conventional post-12th century depiction of the Biblical magi (Adoração dos Magos by Vicente Gil). Balthasar, the youngest magus, bears frankincense and represents Africa. To the left stands Caspar, middle-aged, bearing gold and representing Asia. On his knees is Melchior, oldest, bearing myrrh and representing Europe

The word mágos (Greek) and its variants appear in both the Old and New Testaments. Ordinarily this word is translated "magician" or "sorcerer" in the sense of illusionist or fortune-teller, and this is how it is translated in all of its occurrences (e.g. Acts 13:6) except for the Gospel of Matthew, where, depending on translation, it is rendered "wise man" (KJV, RSV) or left untranslated as Magi, typically with an explanatory note (NIV). However, early church fathers, such as St. Justin, Origen, St. Augustine and St. Jerome, did not make an exception for the Gospel, and translated the word in its ordinary sense, i.e. as "magician". The Gospel of Matthew states that magi visited the infant Jesus to do him homage shortly after his birth (2:1–2:12). The gospel describes how magi from the east were notified of the birth of a king in Judaea by the appearance of his star. Upon their arrival in Jerusalem, they visited King Herod to determine the location of the king of the Jews' birthplace. Herod, disturbed, told them that he had not heard of the child, but informed them of a prophecy that the Messiah would be born in Bethlehem. He then asked the magi to inform him when they find the child so that he himself may also pay homage to the child. Guided by the Star of Bethlehem, the magi found the infant Jesus in a house. They paid homage to him, and presented him with "gifts of gold and of frankincense and of myrrh." (2.11) In a dream they are warned not to return to Herod, and therefore return to their homes by taking another route. Since its composition in the late 1st century, numerous apocryphal stories have embellished the gospel's account. Matthew 2:16 implies that Herod learned from the magi that up to two years had passed since the birth, which is why all male children two years or younger were slaughtered.

In addition to the more famous story of Simon Magus found in chapter 8, the Book of Acts (13:6–11) also describes another magus who acted as an advisor of Sergius Paulus, the Roman proconsul at Paphos on the island of Cyprus, a Jew named Bar-Iesous (son of Jesus), or alternatively Elymas. (Another Cypriot magus named Atomos is referenced by Josephus, working at the court of Felix at Caesarea.)

One of the non-canonical Christian sources, the Syriac Infancy Gospel, provides, in its third chapter, a story of the wise men of the East which is very similar to much of the story in Matthew. This account cites Zoradascht (Zoroaster) as the source of the prophecy that motivated the wise men to seek the infant Jesus.

==== Islam ====
In Arabic, "Magians" (majus) is the term for Zoroastrians. The term is mentioned in the Qur'an, in sura 22 verse 17, where the "Magians" are mentioned alongside those who believe in the Qur'an, the Jews, the Sabians, and the Christians in a list of religions who will be judged on the Day of Resurrection.

=== Eastern ===
==== Dharmic ====
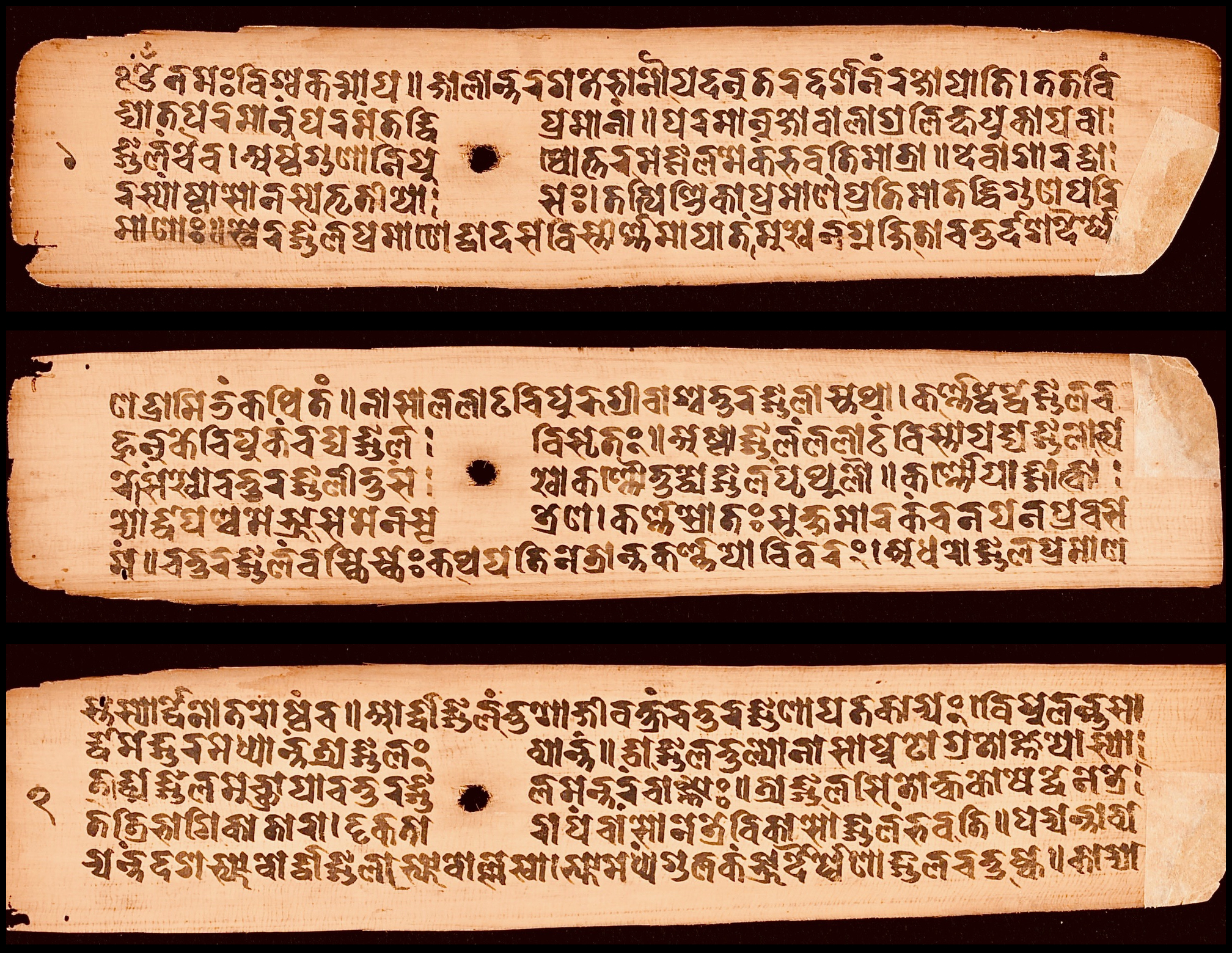
Brihat Samhita of Varahamihira, 1279 CE palm leaf manuscript, Pratima lakshana, Sanskrit

In India, the Sakaldwipiya Brahmins are considered to be the descendants of the ten Maga (Sanskrit मग) priests who were invited to conduct worship of Mitra (Surya) at Mitravana (Multan), as described in the Samba Purana, Bhavishya Purana and the Mahabharata. Their original home was a mythological region called Śākadvīpa. According to Varahamihira (c. 505 – c. 587), the statue of the Sun god (Mitra), is represented as wearing the "northern" (Central Asian) dress, specifically with horse riding boots. Some Brahmin communities of India trace their descent from the Magas. Some classical astronomers and mathematicians of India such are Varahamihira are considered to be the descendants of the Magas.

Varahamihira specifies that installation and consecration of the Sun images should be done by the Magas. al-Biruni mentions that the priests of the Sun Temple at Multan were Magas. The Magas had colonies in a number of places in India, and were the priests at Konark, Martanda and other sun temples.

==== Chinese shamanism ====
Chinese Bronzeware script for wu 巫 "shaman"

Victor H. Mair (1990) suggested that Chinese wū (巫 "shaman; witch, wizard; magician") may originate as a loanword from Old Persian *maguš "magician; magi". Mair reconstructs an Old Chinese *m^{y}ag. The reconstruction of Old Chinese forms is somewhat speculative. The velar final -g in Mair's *m^{y}ag (巫) is evident in several Old Chinese reconstructions (Dong Tonghe's *m^{y}wag, Zhou Fagao's *mjwaγ, and Li Fanggui's *mjag), but not all (Bernhard Karlgren's *m^{y}wo and Axel Schuessler's *ma).

Mair adduces the discovery of two figurines with unmistakably Caucasoid or Europoid features dated to the 8th century BC, found in a 1980 excavation of a Zhou dynasty palace in Fufeng County, Shaanxi Province. One of the figurines is marked on the top of its head with an incised ☩ graph.

Mair's suggestion is based on a proposal by Jao Tsung-I (1990), which connects the "cross potent" bronzeware script glyph for wu 巫 with the same shape found in Neolithic West Asia, specifically a cross potent carved in the shoulder of a goddess figure of the Halaf period.

== Usage in contemporary times ==
In the 1980s, Saddam Hussein's Ba'ath Party used the quranic term majus during the Iran–Iraq War as an ethnic slur against Iranians, both verbally and even in official documents. A 2000 paper elaborated the usage's propaganda significance:

"By referring to the Iranians in these documents as majus, the security apparatus [implied] that the Iranians [were] not sincere Muslims, but rather covertly practice their pre-Islamic beliefs. Thus, in their eyes, Iraq's war took on the dimensions of not only a struggle for Arab nationalism, but also a campaign in the name of Islam."

== See also ==
- Anachitis ('stone of necessity') – stone used to call up spirits from water by Magi in antiquity
- Epiphany (January 6) – a Christian holiday marking the visit of the Magi to the Christ Child
- Fire temple – Zoroastrian place of worship
