= Maga Brahmin =

Brahmin sub-caste from the Indian subcontinent

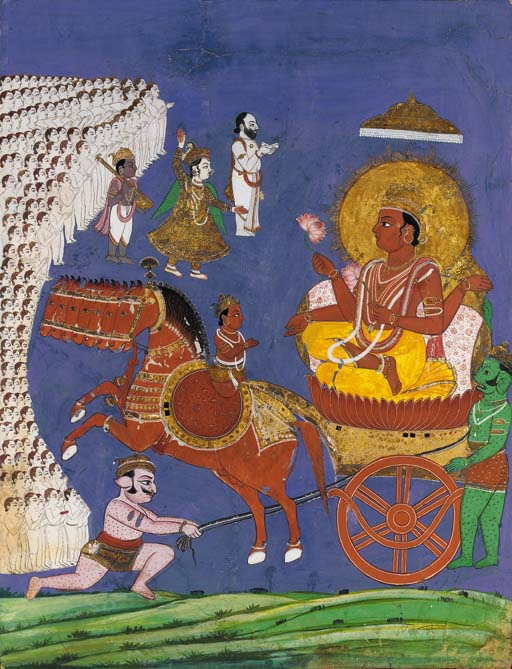
Surya receives worship from the multitudes; Tanjore School miniature painting, 1800's

Maga Brahmins (also known as Sakaldwipiya Brahmin or Bhojaka Brahmins) are a class of Brahmins primarily concentrated in northern India.

== Mentions ==
=== Hindu texts ===
The earliest extant Hindu text to mention the Magas is Samba Purana (c. 7th-8th century CE); the legend made its way into the Bhavishya Purana and even a twelfth century inscription in Eastern India.

After being cursed into a leper, Samba urged Krishna to restore his youth who expressed his inability and deferred to the Sun-God. So, acting upon the advice of Narada, Samba left for the forests of Mitravan on the banks of Chandrabhaga, where the Sun-God resided. There, he propitiated the Sun-God into appearing before himself and secured a cure but, in return, had to accept setting up a solar temple. While the temple was set up using an image received from the Sun-God himself, securing a priest for the temple proved difficult — Brahmins could not be recruited since such worshippers took the offerings for themselves and had to ran afoul of Manusmriti.

At this juncture, Narada and Gauramukha suggested that Magas were the only classes fit for the task but neither knew about their location except to be far away from Dwarka. The Sun-God was consulted, who confirmed what Narada said and noted that the Magas, fluent in Vedas and His ideal worshippers, were to be found among the inhabitants of Śākadvīpa , an entire creation of His own mirroring Jammudwipa. (Note: In Sakdwipa, Magas were the Brahmins; Mashakas, Kshatriyas; Manasas, Vaishyas; and Mandagas, Shudras.) Subsequently, eighteen Maga families would travel across an ocean on the back of Garuda and thus, the first Sun-temple was established in Sambapura.

No further details about the Magas are provided in the Samba Purana but Bhavishya Purana continues to chronicle their afterlifein India, often in self-contradictory ways. Samba apparently arranged for the women of Bhojas (id. uncertain; might be the eponymous Kings of early medieval India) to be married to the Maga migrants; this went against the earlier narrative of bringing eighteen Maga "families". Later, it is claimed that eight of the migrant Magas were actually born of Mandagas and hence had to marry Dasas; their progenies were not Brahmins unlike those from the union with Bhojas.

==== Analysis ====
On the basis of terminological similarities in relevant Puranic verses with proto-Iranian roots and a common tradition of Sun worship, most scholars deem the legend to reflect the migration of Magis of Persia — or some region under the influence of Persian cosmopolis — in multiple waves to India across years. (Note: Stietencron notes three such words in the passage: avyaṅga (ir. aiwyāŋhana), patidāna (ir. paiti.dāna), and varśman (ir. barəsman).) Sambapura has been traditionally identified with Multan — and the temple with the eponymous institution — but there exists little evidence in support and Heinrich von Stietencron rejects the idea.

=== Buddhist texts ===
Mahāvibhāṣa Śāstra, a Buddhist text from Kashmir c. 2nd century C.E. notes the Magas to be Mlechhas (lit. barbarians?) for not seeing anything objectionable in pursuing sexual relations within one's own family. Karma Prajnapti, dated to around the same time, repeats the observations of incest; Magas apparently held women as property of the commons — like cooked rice and pestle, roads and river banks, and fruits and flowers — whose sexuality was accessible to all. In Tarkajvālā (6th century CE), Bhāviveka notes the Magas to be perverted people from Persia: their religious doctrines exhibited similarities with Vedas, in that agamyā-gamana — illicit sex — was supported. Never were they held to be Brahmins.

==== Analysis ====
Bronkhorst sees no reason to doubt that the Buddhist texts were referring to the Magas. However, that the Magas are always held to be in the West of India proper, Jonathan Silk doubts that the Magas might not have followed such practices and they were merely — but reasonably — confused with the Persians. (Note: Persians — always distinguished by the practice of incest, an increasingly immoral behavior — would continue to be featured in a vast spectrum of Buddhist literature for centuries; nowhere were they considered to be Brahmins.)

=== Others ===
Varāhamihira's (6th century CE) Bṛhat Saṃhitā mention the Magas; he himself might have been a Maga. In his Pañcasiddhāntikā, one "Year of Magas" mention 30 names of the "lords of degree of signs" — they are since understood to be a Saivite rendering of the list of Yazatas. Ptolemy's Geography (2nd century CE) noted a particular town to be inhabited by Maga Brahmins. Al-Biruni, an 11th-century Persian polymath, noted some Zoroastrians to have migrated to India where they were known as Magas and in a hostile relation with Buddhists. (Note: The hostility was allegedly on account of their persecuting the Buddhists out of Middle East and Central Asia.)

== Social status ==
In the Brahminical corpus all Mlechhas (lit. foreigners) are routinely referred to in the most disagreeable terms and are either held to be below Sudras or avarna. Saura literature is very scarce in the Hindu cannon and in all probabilities, Magas failed to ever exert considerable influence on any royal power. Consequently, why the Magas were allowed the Brahmin status in society remains a pertinent locus of enquiry.

R. C. Hazra—a preeminent scholar of Puranic literature—believes the Magas and their particular brand of Sun-worship to have gained immense popularity under Scythian patronage; hence, the Brahmins were compelled to draft the Samba Purana, infuse aspects of their cult into prevalent, and accommodate them in the elites. Stietencron, on a comparative assessment of Samba Purana with other texts, disagrees: little foreign influence was visible in the descriptions of the Puranic episode and if at all, the Magas had popularized a pre-existing cult of solar worship. Bronkhorst remarks that even if the Magas had claimed descent from Persian priestly traditions, the Brahminic classes of India (Jambudvīpa) won't have easily accommodated foreigners at the highest echelons of society. On a comparison with Buddhist texts and secular records, he proposes that Sakadvipa was not Persia (or some other territory, west of India) but a "mythico-geographical region" for classical Hindu authors, wherein prevailed the Brahmanical order of society for reasons unknown. Descendants of the Magi migrants of Persia staked a claim to this Brahminic space rather than their native place. (Note: However, the very construction of Sakadwipa might have developed out of fragmented transmissions from Persia.) By the Common Era, their claims would be accepted and serviced in the retrospective construction of Puranic legends.

== Modern India ==
The Sakaldwipiya Brahmins of Rajasthan, Bihar, Odisha, Bengal and Uttar Pradesh are Ayurvedic physicians, priests and landholders.
