= Wooden idols of India =

Wooden idols have traditionally been made in India, as a tractable and commonly-available material to artists and craftsmen in architecture and sculpture. Few specimens survive of early works due to the perishable nature of wood, particularly in a hot and humid climate. However, other sources demonstrate the ancient use of woodcarving in Indian art. This includes a tradition of making icons, often also of wood.

== Earliest Reference ==
The earliest reference to any wooden idol made in India goes to the legend of Jīvantasvāmī – a sandalwood image of Mahāvīra or Vardhamāna, the last Tīrthaṅkara of Jain pantheon. It is said that the idol was carved in his lifetime and worshiped by his followers. This myth, though not materially substantiated, is an obvious proof in favor of an artistic practice – prevailing in the sixth century BC. However, it was only after another seven centuries that we find the oldest literary mention of wood as a suitable plastic medium for the sculpting of cult-icons.

== Textual References ==
The first concrete evidence to the tradition of making wooden idols comes in the form of an epigraph found in Andhra Pradesh. This inscription of Abhirā Vāsudeva, dated c. AD 278, describes an eight-armed wooden sculpture of Lord Viṣn̄u – named as Aṣṭabhujasvāmī. This effigy, said to have medicinal and energizing properties, was installed on the Siddhalahari hill bordering Nagarjunikonda valley.

The specimen, however, is not available today; yet the reference indeed ensures a living tradition in the third century AD. The next thirteen hundred odd years saw the tradition continuing with its vitality and context – and being documented in a series of indigenous literature.

All these texts, variably dated c. second-sixteenth century AD, tell us about a prevailing convention for the classification of divine images – based on the materials used in making them. They also tell us, categorically, how each and every such classification has referred to wood as one of the most suitable medium for this purpose.

Source	Date	Classification
Matsya Purāṇa (Ch 258, sūtra 20–21)	c. late-second / late-fourth / sixth century AD	Gold, silver, copper, jewels, stone, iron, wood and alloy
Mānasara Śilpaśāstra (ch 51)	c. fifth century AD	Gold, silver, copper, stone, wood, sudhā (stucco, also mortar and plaster), śarkarā (gravel or grit), ābhāsa (painting) and earth
Hayaśīrṣa Pan̄carātrama (ādi kānḍa, ch 15, sūtra 1–2)	c. fifth-eleventh / seventh-eighth century / AD 800	Mṛnmayī (clay), dārughaṭitā (wood), lohajā (iron), ratnajā (jewels), gandhajā (fragrance), śailajā (stone) and kousumī (flowers)
Devī Purāṇa (ch 22, sūtra 9–10)	c. fifth / eleventh century AD	Svarṇamayī (gold), rajatamayī (silver), mṛnmayī and dārumayī
Vṛhat Saṁhitā (ch 60, sūtra 4–5)	c. early-sixth century AD	Dārumayī, mṛnmayī, maṇimayī (jewels), sauvarṇī, rajatamayī, tāmramayī (bronze) and śailī
Śāmba Purāṇa (ch 30, sūtra 2)	c. AD 500-800 / 500-900	Svarṇamayī, raupyamayī (silver), tāmrī, pārthivi (clay), prastaramayī (of stone), vārkṣi (wood) and ālekhya (painting)
Bhaviṣya Purāṇa (vol. I, ch 131, sūtra 5–8)	c. AD 500–1500	Wood, clay, jewel, gold, silver, copper and stone
Śukranītisāra (ch 4, sec 4, sūtra 147–151)	--	Sand, paste, paint, enamel, earth, wood, stone and metal

In brief, all these scriptures proclaim in favor of seven major varieties – while each list contains wood as one of the most common phenomenon.

Such evidences are available also in other medieval writings like Vṛhat Saṁhitā and Viṣn̄udharmottaram. They have discussed in length about all the intricate details on the ways and means of procuring suitable timber for the fashioning of divine images. Both have emphasized, in particular, on four significant aspects:

- suitability of different varieties of wood,
- trees that should be considered as forbidden, and
- suitable time for entering the forest, and
- technique of cutting down the required tree/s.

Similar instructions could also be traced in other texts like Viśvakarmā Prakāśa and Rājaballabhava.

Mention could be made, in this connection, about the historical accounts by Huen Tsang or Hiuen Tsang, the Chinese pilgrim, who came to India in the first half of the ninth century AD. During his visit, he encountered a reference to – or the actual specimen of – a wooden idol of Kuan-tzu-tsai Pusa.

“According to the Life the marvelous image of the Kuan-tzu-tsai Pusa was made of sandal wood, and it was enclosed by railings...”

Here, Kuan-tzu-tsai Pusa is none other than Avalokiteśvara, one of the sixteen forms of Bodhisattva; and it's a sandal-wood image of him that the author has written about. The actual specimen, however, is not available today. But the reference advocates in favor of wood, as a useful material for the making of Buddhist-icons during late-eighth or early-ninth century AD.

This phenomenon has also been substantiated by the freestanding sculpture of Tārā, the Buddhist goddess (see Figure 1), discovered by late (Dr) Moreshwar Dikshit. In terms of iconography and style, it belongs to c. ninth-tenth century AD and is considered to be an import from Eastern India. Similar Buddhist icons – collected in a monastery at Chittagong, Bangladesh – ranging in date from about ninth to twelfth-thirteenth century AD, could also be mentioned in this connection.

== Earliest Specimen ==
Most Indian wooden idols of perceptible antiquity and aesthetic excellence – either originate, or belong to the eastern region of this country. Earliest of this genre is the Tārā-image mentioned above, hailed from the debris of cave XXX-I at Kanheri, near Mumbai of Maharashtra. But unfortunately, its present location is yet unknown. A photograph – published in Marg (36/1, 1982) – remains the only evidence, reminding about the Pāla-figures from Bihar and Bengal.

Among the surviving specimens, Bodhisattva Lokanātha (see Figure 2) from Tongibari of Munshigunj, Dhaka (in today's Bangladesh), is considered to be the oldest one. Both in terms of form and style, it bears a striking similarity with the figure from Kanheri; and hence could be assigned to c. ninth-tenth century AD. Yet official records have opted for a much later date – i.e., the eleventh – making it contemporaneous with another specimen from Rampal, also of Munshigunj. This latter one is of Sthiracakra Man̄juśrī (see Figure 3), which in that case has also its share of the claim. However, both the specimens are presently on display at Bangladesh National Museum (E-189 and E-188) at Dhaka.

In this connection, refer could be made of the famous Jagannātha-triad of Puri in Orissa, which was originally installed sometime in c. eleventh century AD. It thus makes the tradition of Balarāma-Subhadrā-Jagannātha contemporaneous to the above-mentioned specimens from Bengal. But the actual specimens in the temple today are not of that antiquity; as the idols have customarily been replicated and replaced in regular intervals.

It's true, indeed, that the earliest surviving wooden idols in India are not as old as those from Egypt or China. But their refined approach and stylistic maturity certainly affirm a high quality practice, generated by an extremely old and rich traditional ancestry. It had a long history of evolution, though undocumented, which finally resulted into the new school of Indian sculpture – taking shape in the eastern provinces in c. AD 800.

Following the earlier traditions, this new school also embraced wood – equally with other mediums like clay, stone, metal etc. – for the execution of plastic forms in relief and in-the-round. This very genre of wooden sculptures kept on flourishing till c. AD 1200, while the making of divine images remained as a virile and integral part. After losing volume and scale in the next three centuries, it regained strength and vitality through the renaissance of sixteenth. It again evolved, finally, through the following centuries in the dynamism and abundance of Assam, Bengal, Karnataka, Kerala, Nagaland, Orissa and Rajasthan.
