= Shakdvipa =

Hindu mythological island

Shakadvipa (Sanskrit: शाकद्वीप, romanized: Śhākadvīpa, lit. 'teak island'), is an island featured in Hindu scriptures. The island is named after a great teak tree that is stated to venerated in its midst. Its terrain and inhabitants are described in the Puranas.

== Literature ==
=== Brahma Purana ===
According to the Brahma Purana, the ocean known as Kshira Sagara is surrounded by Shakadvipa, which is described to be twice the size of Kraunchadvipa, another island. The sovereign of the island is called Bhavya, and he is mentioned as having seven sons, offering each a region of the land: Jalada, Sukumara, Kaumara, Maṇīcaka, Kusumottara, Modaka, and Mahadruma. The seven mountains that exist on this island are Udaya, Jaladhara, Raivataka, Shyama, Ambikeya, Astikeya, and Kesari. A great shaka (teak) tree is described to grow there, frequented by gandharvas and siddhas. The members of the four varnas who live here do so without contracting any disease. The Magas are the Brahmanas, the Magadhas are the Kshatriyas, the Manasas are the Vaishyas, and the Mandagas are the Shudras. The seven sacred rivers that flow through this island are stated to be Sukumari, Kumari, Nalini, Renuka, Ikshu, Dhenuka, and Gabhasti. No excesses of any emotion are stated to be experienced by the islanders. Vishnu is stated to be worshipped here, in his form of Surya.

Here Ikshu river (Also In Sanskrit texts, the river is also referred to as Vakṣu (वक्षु). The Brahmanda Purana refers to the river as Chaksu (चक्षु) which means 'an eye' in sanskrit) river mentioned is identified with modern Oxus river( Amu Darya) River.

Magas mentioned above are associated closely with maga bramhanas brought by Samba From sakadvipa to mulasthan identified with Multhan sun temple to establish surya idol in the temple to cure the leprosy curse of samba as mentioned in Samba purana Chapters 26-27 of this text narrate the story of bringing the eighteen Maga Brahmins families from Śākadvīpa by Samba and appointing them as the priests of the Surya temple in Mitravan(Identified to be the older name of multhan). He is then told in chapter 27 that only the Maga Brahmins in Shakadvipa are capable of worshiping the idol of Surya. Samba then went to Shakadvipa and fetched Maga Brahmins to worship Surya. The Maga are described as reciting the Vedas in a mysterious way, they wear avayanga. They drink homa juice. Samba brought 18 families from Shakadvipa, flying on the divine bird Garuda. The image Idol of Surya explained that it was crafted in Shakadvipa itself, and eventually arrived at Mitravana( Multhan Sun temple).

=== Vishnu Purana ===
The account of Shakadvipa in the Vishnu Purana is much the same as the Brahma Purana. The inhabitants of this island are described to be extremely virtuous, feeling no jealousy and transgressing no boundaries.

== See also ==
- Jambudvipa
- Plaksadvipa
- Manidvipa
