= Jambudvīpa =

Sanskrit endonym of the Indian subcontinent

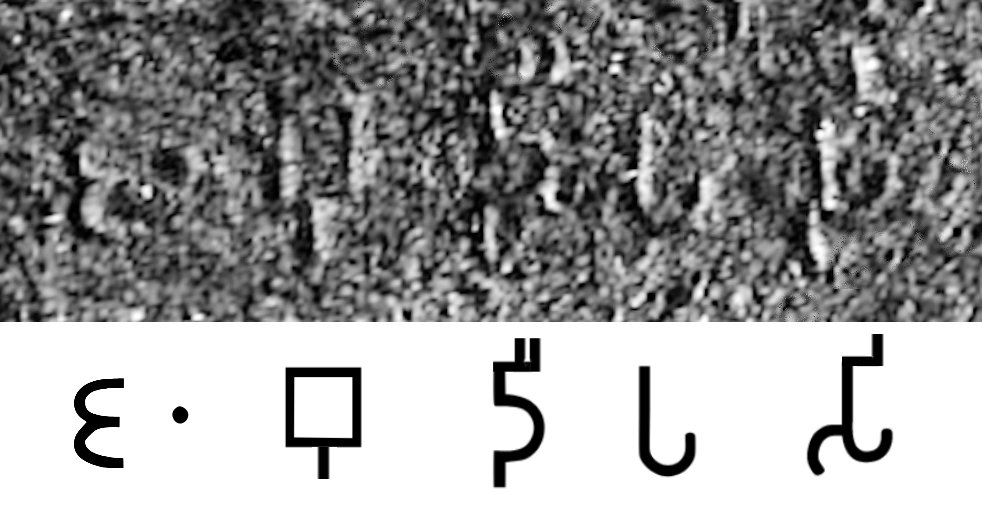
The Prakrit name Jambudīpasi Pali Brahmi name 𑀚𑀀𑀩𑀼𑀤𑀻𑀧𑀸𑀲𑀺 (Sanskrit "Jambudvīpa") for "India" in the Sahasram Minor Rock Edict of Ashoka, circa 250 BCE (Brahmi script)

Jambudvīpa (Pali: Jambudīpa) is a term for the Indian subcontinent, often used in ancient Indian sources.

The term comes from ancient Indian cosmogony and is based on the concept of dvīpa, meaning 'island' or 'continent'. The term Jambudvīpa was used by Ashoka to describe his realm in the 3rd century BC. The same term is also found in subsequent texts, for instance the Kannada inscriptions from the 10th century CE, to refer to the region, presumably ancient India.

The word Jambudvīpa literally means 'the land of jambu trees', with jambu being the Sanskrit term for the Syzygium cumini tree (or alternatively rose apple tree).

== History ==
Among the earliest surviving historical record of the term Jambudvīpa, it appears in the Bhisma Parva of the epic Mahabharata and later also in the 3rd century BCE inscriptions of the Mauryan Emperor Ashoka. In his Minor Rock Edicts, such as the ones found at Sahasram and Maski, the term was used to describe the earthly realm or the spatial expanse of his empire. This usage marked a significant shift where a term from ancient cosmic geography was applied to a real political territory. Scholars note that the inscription text represents the earliest datable written evidence of the term on the Indian subcontinent. These early linguistic transmissions and the tracking of the Brahmi script records are analyzed deeply within modern South Asian epigraphical studies. Through these royal decrees, the name became permanently tied to the geopolitical identity of ancient India.

Following its early political use, the term was widely expanded within Buddhist and Jain sacred literatures. In Buddhist cosmology, Jambudvīpa was defined as the southern island-continent situated around the sacred Mount Sumeru. It was uniquely identified as the only realm where humans could hear the teachings of the Dharma and achieve full enlightenment. Similarly, Jain cosmology placed Jambudvīpa at the absolute center of Madhyaloka, the middle part of the universe where humans live. Jain texts like the Jambūdvīpaprajñapti divided this concentric circular continent into various geographic zones, including Bharat Kshetra. Both religious traditions successfully preserved the term as a bridge between symbolic space and the physical subcontinent.

During the classical period, Hindu Puranic texts integrated Jambudvīpa into a wider system of seven concentric island-continents. Texts like the Vishnu Purana described it as the innermost continent surrounded by a massive salt ocean. The geographic descriptions in these texts often mixed realistic descriptions of mountains and rivers with symbolic religious myths. As the centuries progressed, the name continued to be used in real-world administrative and royal records. For example, Kannada stone inscriptions from the 10th century CE in the Mysore region still used the term to refer to the broader Indian subcontinent. This shows that the name maintained its practical geopolitical meaning for over a thousand years after its first appearance.

== Political Legitimacy and Sovereign Claims ==
In premodern India, ruling monarchs frequently used the cosmological term Jambudvīpa to establish their political legitimacy and supreme authority. By claiming control over a territory described as part of this central continent, kings could claim the prestigious title of a Chakravartin, which means a universal ruler. According to Ali, This ideological framework allowed local or regional kings to project their power far beyond their actual administrative borders. Royal courts deliberately linked the physical geography of their kingdoms to the grand layout of the universe to make the king's rule seem divinely ordained.

This practice of using cosmic geography for political claims is highly visible across centuries of royal inscriptions and land grants. For example, during the early medieval period, the Rashtrakuta and Western Chalukya kings routinely inserted the term Jambudvīpa into their official copper-plate charters to signal universal dominance. Similarly, tenth-century stone inscriptions from the Mysore region explicitly describe sovereign entities as ruling within the boundaries of Bharata-kshetra, a core zone of Jambudvīpa. Even southern dynasties, such as the Cholas, adopted similar cosmic rhetoric to celebrate their expanding military victories over rival kingdoms. By documenting these claims on permanent stone and metal inscriptions, premodern dynasties successfully integrated their short-term political achievements into the lasting sacred history of the subcontinent.

== In Hinduism ==
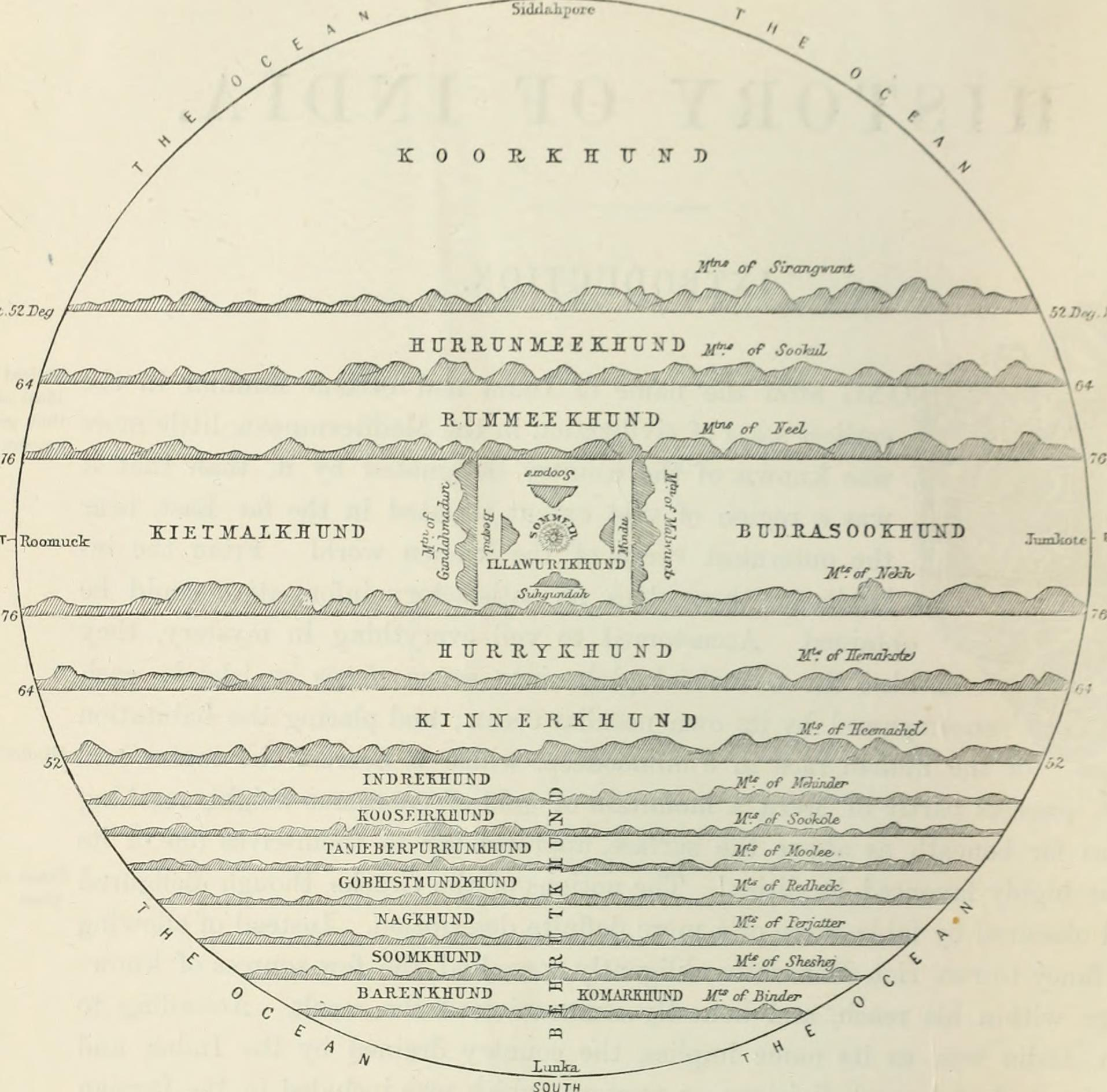
Map of Jambudvipa

According to Puranic cosmography, the world is divided into seven concentric island continents (sapta-dvipa vasumati) separated by the seven encircling oceans, each double the size of the preceding one (going out from within). The seven continents of the Puranas are stated as Jambudvīpa, Plakṣadvīpa, Śamaladvīpa, Kuśadvīpa, Krauñcadvīpa, Śākadvīpa, and Puṣkaradvīpa. Seven intermediate oceans consist of salt-water, sugarcane juice, wine, ghee, yogurt, milk and water respectively. The mountain range called Lokaloka, meaning "world-no-world", stretches across this final sea, delineating the known world from the dark void.

Jambudvipa, also known as Sudarśanadvīpa, forms the innermost concentric island in the above scheme. Its name is said to derive from the jambu tree, Syzygium cumini. The fruits of the jambu tree are said, in the Viṣṇupurāṇa (ch.2), to be as large as Asian elephants, and when they become rotten and fall upon the crest of the mountains, a river of juice is formed from their expressed juice. The river so formed is called the Jambunadi "Jambu River" and flows through Jambudvipa, whose inhabitants drink its waters. Insular continent Jambudvipa is said to comprise nine varshas (zones) and eight significant parvatas (mountains).

The Markandeya Purana portrays Jambudvipa as being depressed on its south and north and elevated and broad in the middle. The elevated region forms the varsha named Ila-vrta or Meruvarsha. At the center of Ila-vrta lies the golden Mount Meru, the king of mountains. On the summit of Mount Meru, is the vast city of Brahma, known as Brahmapuri. Surrounding Brahmapuri are eight cities – the one of Indra and of seven other Devatas.

Markandeya Purana and Brahmanda Purana divide Jambudvipa into four vast regions shaped like four petals of a lotus with Mount Meru being located at the center like a pericarp. The city of Brahmapuri is said to be enclosed by a river, known as Akasha Ganga. Akasha Ganga is said to issue forth from the foot of Vishnu and after washing the lunar region falls "through the skies" and after encircling the Brahmapuri "splits up into four mighty streams", which are said to flow in four opposite directions from the landscape of Mount Meru and irrigate the vast lands of Jambudvipa.

The common names of the dvīpas, having their varṣas (9 for Jambu-dvīpa, 7 for the other dvīpas) with a mountain and a river in each varṣa, is given in several Purāṇas. There is a distinct set of names provides, however, in other Purāṇas. The most detailed geography is that described in the Vāyu Purāṇa.

== In Buddhism ==
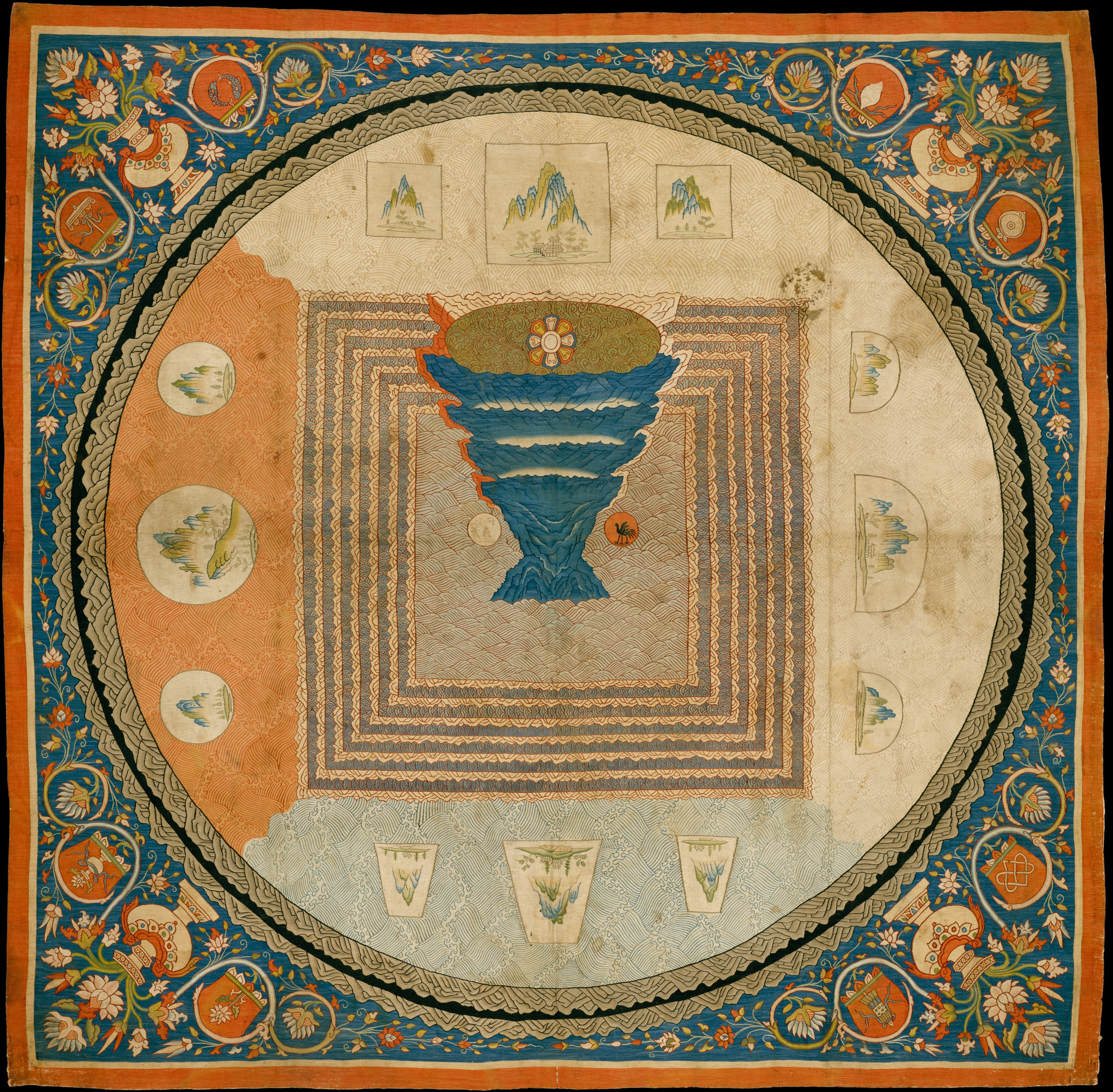
Yuan dynasty depiction of Mount Meru surrounded by the four continents.

The Buddhist cosmology divides the bhūmaṇḍala (circle of the earth) into three separate levels: Kāmadhātu (Desire realm), Rūpadhātu (Form realm), and Ārūpyadhātu (Formless realm). In the Kāmadhātu is located Mount Meru (Sumeru), which is said to be surrounded by four island-continents. The southernmost island is called Jambudvīpa. The other three continents of Buddhist accounts around Sumeru are not accessible to humans from Jambudvīpa. Jambudvīpa is shaped like a triangle with a blunted point facing south, somewhat like the Indian subcontinent. In its center is a gigantic Jambu tree from which the continent takes its name, meaning "Jambu Island".

Jambudipa, one of the four Mahādīpas, or great continents, which are included in the Cakravāla "cosmos" and are ruled by a cakravartin. They are grouped round Mount Sumeru. In Jambudvīpa is Himavā with its eighty-four thousand peaks, its lakes, mountain ranges, etc.

This continent derives its name from the Jambu-tree (also called Naga) which grows there, its trunk fifteen yojanas in girth, its outspreading branches fifty yojanas in length, its shade one hundred yojanas in extent and its height one hundred yojanas (Vin.i.30; SNA.ii.443; Vsm.i.205f; Sp.i.119, etc.) On account of this tree, Jambudīpa is also known as Jambusanda (SN.vs.552; SNA.i.121). The continent is ten thousand yojanas in extent; of these ten thousand, four thousand are covered by the ocean, three thousand by the Himālaya mountains, while three thousand are inhabited by men (SNA.ii.437; UdA.300).

Jambudvīpa is the region where the humans live and is the only place where a being may become enlightened by being born as a human being. It is in Jambudvīpa that one may receive the gift of Dharma and come to understand the Four Noble Truths, the Noble Eightfold Path and ultimately realize the liberation from the cycle of life and death. Another reference is from the Buddhist text, the Mahāvaṃsa, where the emperor Ashoka's son Mahinda, after becoming a Bhikku, introduces himself to King Devanampiya Tissa of Anuradhapura (Anuradhapura being then capital city of what is now known as Sri Lanka) as from Jambudvipa, referring to what is now the Indian subcontinent. This is described in the Kṣitigarbha Bodhisattva Pūrvapraṇidhāna Sūtra in Mahayana Buddhism.

== In Jainism ==
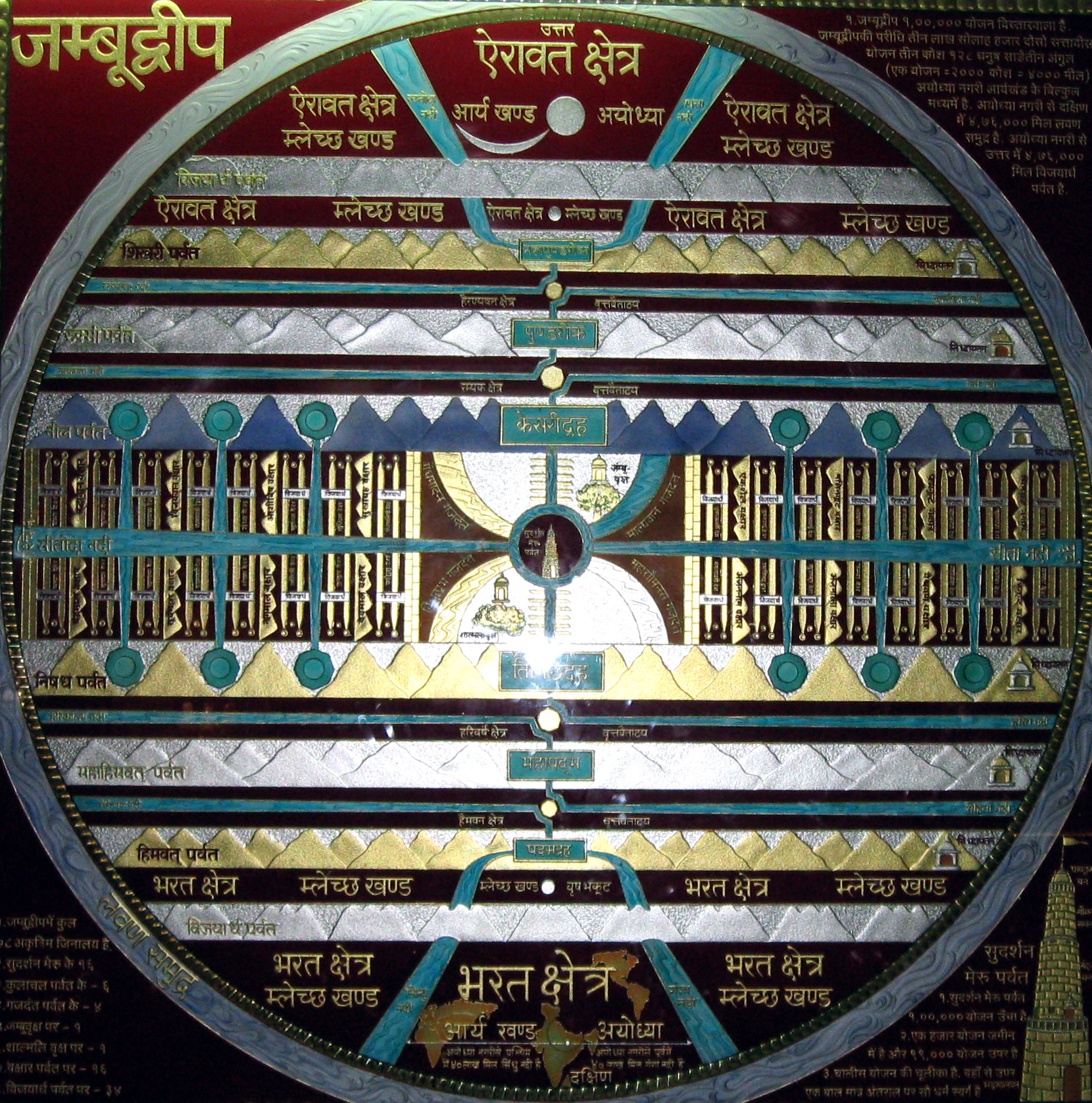
Image depicting map of Jambudvipa as per Jain Cosmology

According to Jain cosmology, Jambūdvīpa is at the centre of Madhyaloka, or the middle part of the universe, where the humans reside. Jambūdvīpaprajñapti or the treatise on the island of Roseapple tree contains a description of Jambūdvīpa and life biographies of Ṛṣabha and King Bharata. Trilokasāra (Essence of the three worlds), Trilokaprajñapti (Treatise on the three worlds), Trilokadipikā (Illumination of the three worlds) and Kṣetrasamāsa (Summary of Jain geography) are the other texts that provide the details of Jambūdvīpa and Jain cosmology. Madhyaloka consists of many continent-islands surrounded by oceans, first eight whose names are:

Continent/ Island	Ocean
Jambūdvīpa	Lavanoda (Salt - ocean)
Dhatki Khand	Kaloda (Black sea)
Puskarvardvīpa	Puskaroda (Lotus Ocean)
Varunvardvīpa	Varunoda (Varun Ocean)
Kshirvardvīpa	Kshiroda (Ocean of milk)
Ghrutvardvīpa	Ghrutoda (Ghee ocean)
Ikshuvardvīpa	Iksuvaroda (Ocean of Sugarcane Juice)
Nandishwardvīpa	Nandishwaroda

Mount Meru is at the centre of the world surrounded by Jambūdvīpa, in form of a circle forming a diameter of 100,000 yojanas.

Jambūdvīpa continent has six mountains, dividing the continent into nine zones (Kshetra). The names of these zones are:

1. Bharat Kshetra
2. Mahavideha Kshetra
3. Airavat Kshetra
4. Ramyakwas
5. Hariwas
6. Hairanyvat Kshetra
7. Haimavat Kshetra
8. Devkuru
9. Uttarkuru

=== Architecture ===
Jambudweep Jain tirtha in Hastinapur, constructed under supervision of Gyanmati Mataji, is a depiction of Jambudvipa as per Jain cosmology.

== Jambudvipa in geopolitical sense ==
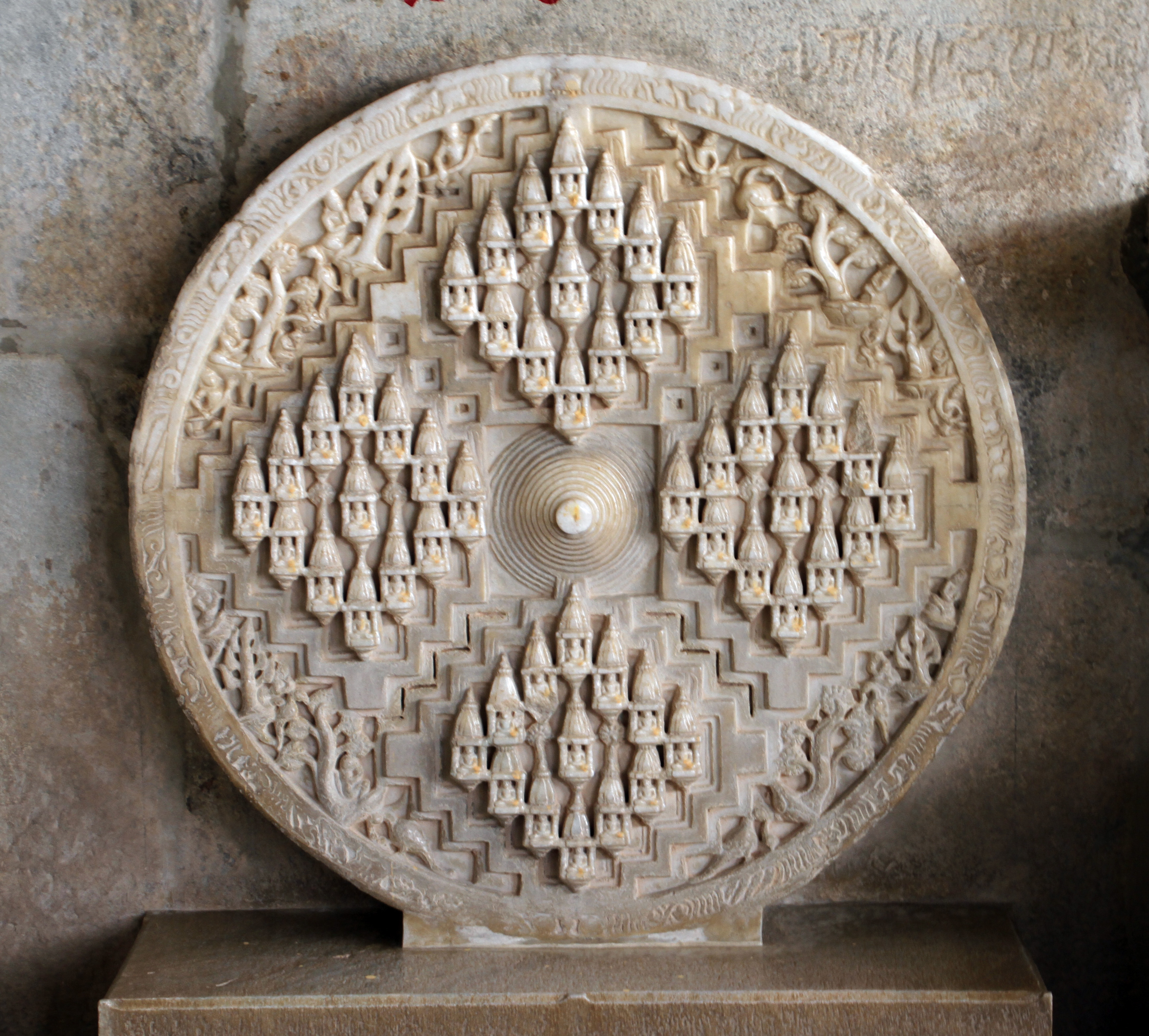
Image depicting map of Jambudvipa as per Jain Cosmology at Ranakpur Jain Temple

The term Jambudvipa is used by Ashoka perhaps to represent his realm in 3rd century BCE, same terminology is then repeated in subsequent inscriptions for instance Mysorean inscription from the tenth century AD which also describes the region, presumably India, as Jambudvipa.

‘ the Kuntala country (which included the north-western parts of Mysore and the southern parts of the Bombay Presidency) was ruled by the nava-Nanda, Gupta-kula, Mauryya kings; then the Rattas ruled it : after whom were the Chalukyas; then the Kalachuryya family; and after them the (Hoysala) Ballalas.'’ Another, at Kubatur, expressly states that Chandra Gupta ruled the Naga-khanda in the south of the Bharata-kshetra of Jambu dvipa : this is the Nagara-khanda Seventy of so many inscriptions, of which Bandanikke (Bandalike in Shimoga) seems to have been the chief town. And further, a record to be noticed below says that the daughters of the Kadamba king were given in marriage to the Guptas.

— Annual Report Of Mysore 1886 To 1903

== See also ==
- Names for India
- Shakadvipa
- Uttarakuru
- Karshvar, equivalent continents in the Avesta
