= Madda =

Madda can be:

- Madda, an Indian surname
- A form of Madra, a region and kingdom in ancient India
- An Arabic word, used in Egypt, for falaka (corporal punishment on the feet)
- A type of harakat in the Arabic script
- The name of a king, see Uttarakuru
- In contemporary Jewish orthodox thought on Divine Providence, knowledge of the functioning of nature and society. Also used to mean science.
- A nickname for people with the name Madeline
