= Uttarakuru =

Vedic Hindu tribe in Ancient India

The Uttarakurus (Sanskrit: उत्तर कुरु; Uttarakuru) were an early Vedic Hindu tribe that inhabited the Uttarakuru country or Uttara Kuru Kingdom. It is also the name of a dvipa ('continent') in ancient Hindu cosmology. The name "Uttara-Kuru" means "North of Kuru (kingdom)". The Kurus were a tribe and also a kingdom during the Vedic civilization of Ancient India. The Uttara Kuru are therefore defined as a population to the north of the Kurus, which historians have concluded to be north of the Himalayas, in Central Asia.

Some modern historians identify this kingdom's territory as an Indian frontier north of Gandhara, that could encompass modern-day Iran, Kazakhstan, Afghanistan, Tajikistan, Turkmenistan, Uzbekistan, Kyrgyzstan, and parts of southern Russia.

The Greek "Ottarakorai" and the Roman "Attacori" myths are probably related to Uttara Kuru.

At some point during the reign of Pururavas-Aila (the first king mentioned in the line of lunar dynasty of Indian kings) Uttara Kuru and the Kurus of India belonged to the same Kuru Empire. Arjuna collected tribute from Uttara Kuru during his northern military campaign for Yudhishthira's Rajasuya sacrifice. The epics also mention that they followed a republican constitution with no monarchy.

== Vedic literature ==
Aitareya Brahmana makes first reference to Uttarakuru and Uttaramadra as real-life Janapadas. According to Aitareya Brahmana, these two nations lay beyond the Himalayan ranges (Hindukush). The Aitareya Brahmana adduces these two people as examples of republican (vairajiya) nations, where whole Janapada took the consecration of rulership.

Aitareya Brahmana again notes that Uttarakuru was a deva-kshetra or divine land.

== Puranas ==
Based on its description in the Puranas, Uttarakuru seems to be in the real world.

Puranic cosmography divides Earth into seven concentric islands called Jambu, Plaksha, Salmali, Kushadvipa, Kraunca, Sakaldwipiya, and Pushkara, that are separated by the seven encircling seas. The insular continent Jambudvipa forms the innermost concentric island in the scheme of continents. Jambudvipa includes nine countries (varṣa) and nine mountains. The land of Illa-vrta lies at the center of Jambudivipa at whose center is located Mount Meru (Hindu Kush). The land of Uttarakuru lies to the north of Mount Meru/ Kailash.

The Bhagavata Purana notes the Uttarakuru as the land of the "northern Kurus", a people separate from the Dakshina Kurus. The Brahmanda Purana and Vayu Purana state that Pururavas, the ancestor of the Puru race once inhabited with Urvashi in Uttarakuru. In Matsya Purana, Uttarakuru is described as 'Tirtha', that is: a pure place where one went to undergo ritual ablutions.

== Mahabharata ==
Mahabharata sometimes glorifies the Uttarakuru as a fairy land. It is stated to be the ultimate abode of the blessed souls. The souls of the blessed ones and the glorious Kshatriyas who fall in battle go to Uttarakuru after death.

Adiparva of Mahabharata refers to a practice of free love among the denizens of Uttarakuru, like the one followed by birds and the beasts, and is not regarded sinful as it is stated to have the approval of the rishis and the sanction of antiquity. At other times, the epic describes the Uttarakurus as real entity and associates them with the real Kurus.

At the Rajasuya Sacrifice performed by king Yudhishtra, the kings of north-west brought gifts, some of which belonged to Uttarakuru.

After reducing the Kambojas and Daradas on south of Hindukush, Arjuna proceeded to Trans-Hindukush countries and fought with the Lohas, Parama-Kambojas and the Rishikas. Thereafter, Arjuna subjugated the Kimpuruhas, Haratakas and the Uttarakurus, which were the neighboring tribes in the trans-Himalaya region.

Karna in practice of war started Vijayatra conquering whole Eurasia.

== Ramayana ==
In the enumeration of the countries of north, Ramayana references Kambojas, Yavanas, Shakas, Paradas and then further northwards, it refers to the land of the Uttarakurus lying beyond river Shailoda and Kichaka bamboos valleys. It gives very vivid and graphic picture of Uttarakuru region.

== Buddhist text ==
Uttarakuru also finds numerous references in Buddhist literature. In Digha Nikaya, Uttarakuru is said to be the name of city. Lalita-Vistara describes the Uttarakuru as Pratyanta-dvipa or a frontier island.

Uttarakuru is well described in the Atanatiya Sutta of the Digha Nikaya. It is an island 24000 Yojanas away from Jambudvipa. It is one of the great Mahadvipas or continents. It is said to be a place of great abundance. It falls under the rule of the heavenly king Vessavana. Atanatiya is one of the great cities of this land. The inhabitants are elegant in complexion, unselfish, have no marital relationships (for more than 7 days), have no property of their own, no houses. But they are able to sleep on the earth, sweet smelling rice without husk grows on its own accord, rice is cooked on pots using stoves and self heating crystals. The people of Uttarakuru naturally have great virtue of Pancasila and a fixed lifespan. Trees have an abundance of fruits, birds sing beautiful songs (some cry saying "jiva" or long life) and there is an all giving Kalparuksha. It is also said that only those with great iddhi powers or cakkavattin kings who can visit this place. These people cannot comprehend the Dhamma.

A Burmese text called Lokapannatti gives further details on Uttarakuru.

Sumangalavilasini says that the wife of a Chakravarti king comes either from Uttarakuru or from the race of a king Madra.

Buddhaghosa records a tradition which states that, when Vedic king Mandhata returned to Jambudvipa from his sojourn in the four Mahadipas, there were, in his retinue, a large number of the people of Uttarakuru. They all settled down in Jambudípa, and their settlement became known as Kururattha (Kuru Rashtra). Majjhima Commentary also attests that the people of Kururatha had originally belonged to the Uttarakuru. Uttarakuru is mentioned in Dhammapada Verse 416 in relation to Jotika, a treasurer and extraordinarily rich person of Rajagaha who was a follower of the Buddha and later became an arahat. He had an alien wife who was brought to him by the gods and she came from Uttarakuru or the 'Northern Island' since it is situated in the North of Mt. Meru, a mythical structure in the cosmos that harbours various abodes/planets including the earth. Her name was Satulakayi and she brought with her a pint-pot of rice and three crystals stone-stove that cooked rice automatically and could serve food for many people. She stayed with Jotika until he joined the Order and became an arahat, after which she went back to Uttarakuru.

Uttarakuru is also mentioned in the Abhidhamma text in relation to the Buddha's visit to Tavatimsa, a heavenly world of devas where the Buddha went for the whole of the three-month period of the rains (vassa) to expound the Abhidhamma to the gods. Since the Buddha was a human he required to feed his physical body during a short tenure in Tavatismsa which is equal to four calendar months on earth. He went for alms to Uttarakuru which is an abode of humanoid beings that lies near Tavatimsa and he did not come back to the earth. <DhA.iv.199-213>

Uttarakuru is mentioned in the Sarvāstivāda Vaibhāsika canon. Pt. 23 in Bareau's anthology says: "Les habitants de l'Uttarakuru n'ont pas de détachement (virāga) et les nobles (ārya) n'y naissent pas." (The citizens of Uttarakuru are not dispassionate (virāga) and nobles (ārya) are not born there.)

== Rajatarangini of Kalhana ==
According to Rajatarangini of Kalhana, king Lalitaditya Muktapida of Kashmir leads a war expedition against the tribes of north (i.e. north of Kashmir) and in sequence, encounters the Kambojas, Tusharas, Bhauttas, Daradas, Valukambudhis, Uttarakurus, Strirajya (mythical or otherwise) and Pragjyotisha with whom he fights one after the other.

== Foreign sources ==
Ptolemy's Geography refers to Ottorokorai (Uttarakuru) tribe, Ottorokora as a city, and Ottorokoras as a river.

The Attacori of Pliny probably also refers to the Uttarakuru people and their country.

== Geographical location ==
Though the later texts mix up the facts with the fancies on Uttarakurus, yet in the earlier, and some of the later texts, Uttarakurus indeed appear to be historical people. Hence scholars have attempted to identify the actual location of Uttarakuru.

Puranic accounts always locate the Uttarakuru varsa in the northern parts of Jambudvipa (India).

The Uttarakuru is taken by some as identical with the Kuru country mentioned in the Rig-Veda. The Kurus and Krivis (Panchala) are said to form the Vaikarana of Rigveda and the Vaikarana is often identified with Kashmir. Therefore, Dr Zimmer likes to identify the Vaikarana Kurus with the Uttarakurus and places them in India's Kashmir.

German-American historian, Michael Witzel locates Uttarakuru in the south-eastern parts of Central Asia.

According to Kashmiri historian, Subhash Kak, Uttara Kuru was the Tarim Basin in Xinjiang, in Central Asia.

According to some scholars, the above locations however do not seem to be correct since they go against Aitareya Brahmana evidence which clearly states that Uttarakuru and Uttaramadra lay beyond Himalaya (pren himvantam janapada Uttarakurva Uttaramadra). Moreover, no notice of the Uttaramadras, i.e., Bahlika (Bactria) has been taken off while fixing up the above location of Uttarakuru. Uttarakurus and Uttaramadras are stated to be immediate neighbors in the Trans-Himalaya region per Aitareya Brahmana evidence.

Ramayana testifies that the original home of the Kurus was in Bahli country. Ila, son of Parajapati Karddama was a king of Bahli, where Bahli represents Sanskrit Bahlika (Bactria). Also the kings from Aila lineage have been called Karddameyas. The Aila is also stated to be the lineage of the Kurus themselves. The Karddamas obtained their name from river Karddama in Persia/ancient Iran. Moreover, Sathapatha Brahmana attests a king named Bahlika Pratipeya as of the Kauravya lineage. Bahlika Pratipeya, as the name implies, was a prince of Bahlika (Bactria). Thus, the Bahli, Bahlika was the original home of the Kurus. Thus, Bahlika or Bactria may have constituted the Uttarakuru. Mahabharata and Sumangalavilasini also note that the people of Kuru had originally migrated from Uttarakutru. Bactria is evidently beyond the Hindukush i.e. Himalaya. In ancient literature, Himalaya is said to be extending from eastern ocean to western ocean and even today is not separated from it.

The above identification of Uttarakuru comes from Dr M. R. Singh.

K. P. Jayswal identifies Mt Meru of the Puranas with the Hindukush ranges and locates the Uttakuru in the Pamirs itself.

V. S. Aggarwala thinks that the Uttarakuru was located to north of Pamirs in Central Asia and was also famous for its horses of Tittirakalamasha variety. Thus it probably comprised parts of Kyrgyzstan and Tian-Shan. Incidentally, the reference to horses from Uttarakuru rules out any possibility of locating Uttarakurus in Kashmir and Uttarakhand states since these regions have never been noted for their horses.

Buddha Prakash locates the Uttarakuru-varsa in Sinkiang province of China.

Bhishamaparava of Mahabharata attests that the country of Uttarakuru lay to the north of Mt Meru and to the south of Nila Parvata

The Mt Meru of Hindu traditions is identified with the knot of Pamirs. Mountain Nila may have been the Altai-Mt.

The Mahabharata refers to the Kichaka bamboos growing on the banks of river Shailoda. Mahabharata further attests that the Kichaka bamboo region was situated between Mountain Meru (Pamirs) and Mountain Mandara (Alta Tag). The river valleys between these two mountains are still overgrown with forests of Kichaka Bamboos.

Ramayana also attests that the valleys of river Shailoda were overgrown with Kichhaka bamboos and the country of Uttarakuru lay beyond river Shailoda as well as the valleys of Kichaka bamboos.

River Shailoda of Ramayana and of Mahabharata has been variously identified with river Khotan, Yarkand, and Syr (Jaxartes) by different scholars.

Raghuvamsa also refers to the Kichaka bamboos of Central Asia in the eastern regions of the Pamirs or Meru mountains which were known as Dirghavenu in Sanskrit.

The above discussion shows that the land of Uttarakurus was located north of river Shailoda as well as of the Kichaka bamboo valley.

Rajatarangini places Uttarkuru land in the neighborhood of Strirajya. Based on Xuanzang's evidence, Strirajya is identified as a country lying north of Kashmir, south of Khotan and west of Tibet.

Thus, the Uttarakuru which finds reference in the Ramayana, Mahabharata and Rajatarangini probably can not be identified with the Bahlika or Bactria as M. R. Singh has concluded.

Uttarakuru probably comprised north-west of Sinkiang province of China and parts of the Tian-Shan Mountains.

Christian Lassen suggests that the Ottorokoroi of Ptolemy should be located in the east of Kashgar i.e. in Tarim Basin.

Some writers, however, assert that Uttarakuru was the name for the vast area lying north of Himalaya and extending as far as Arctic Circle.

Some people tend to identify the Uttarakurus and the Uttaramadras with the ancestors of the Tocharian (Uttarakuru = Tokhari) branch of Indo-Europeans, located to the north of the Himalayas

Tokhari or Tukharas, the later Yucchis, are the same as the Rishikas of Mahabharata.

== See also ==
- Kingdoms of Ancient India
- Kuru kingdom

== Bibliography ==
- Geographical Data in Early Puranas, 1972, Dr M. R. Singh
- Flood, Gavin (1996). An Introduction to Hinduism. Cambridge: Cambridge University Press. ISBN 0-521-43878-0.
- Wilson, H. H. (2006). The Vishnu Purana: A System of Hindu Mythology and Tradition. Cambridge: Read Country Books. ISBN 1-84664-664-2.
- Mahabharata of Krishna Dwaipayana Vyasa, translated to English by Kisari Mohan Ganguli
