= Plakṣadvīpa =

Continent in traditional Hindu cosmology

Plakṣadvīpa (Sanskrit: प्लक्षद्वीप) is one of the seven dvipas envisioned in Hindu cosmology. The word Plakṣadvīpa literally refers to 'the land of fig trees' where plakṣa is the Sanskrit name of the fig tree, and dvīpa means 'island' or 'continent'.

== Description ==
=== Brahma Purana ===
The Brahma Purana describes Plakṣadvīpa as a paradise 100,000 yojanas wide, possessing seven main mountains and seven main rivers. The mere mention of the latter has the ability to "dispel sins altogether", and "the people of the region drink waters thereof and feel delighted". At the centre of the continent is a colossal fig tree, which gives the region its name. Its ruler, Medhātithi, had seven sons, Śāntabhaya, Śiśira, Sukhodaya, Ānanda, Śiva, Kṣemaka and Dhruva, who rule sub-kingdoms on the continents. Its inhabitants are described as living for 5,000 years, who live lives of perfect health and happiness as prescribed by their dharma. Societally, the text asserts that the four varnas of Plakṣadvīpa are the Āryakas, Kuraras, Viviṃsas and Bhāvins, respectively equivalent to the Brahmins, Kshatriyas, Vaishyas and Shudras of Jambudvipa. The primary religion of Plakṣadvīpa is said to the worship of Krishna in the form of Soma.

=== Vishnu Purana ===
The description of Plakṣadvīpa in the Vishnu Purana is similar to the Brahma Purana. The text additionally claims that its long-lived and virtuous inhabitants live in the company of gods and gandharvas.

== See also ==
- Hindu cosmology
