= Lokaloka =

In Hindu belief, Lokaloka is an enormous mountain belt believed to be ten thousand yojanas in breadth, and as many in height. It features in Puranic cosmography as the dividing line between the known world, consisting of seven concentric island continents or dvipas and seven encircling oceans, and the dark void of nothingness. The name itself means "world and non-world." Lokaloka acts as a circular wall along the circumference of the terrestrial disc.

== Etymology ==
The name Lokaloka is derived from the Sanskrit words loka meaning "world" and aloka meaning "non-world" or "darkness," together meaning "world and non-world." In some texts it is also called Alokaparvata, "the mountain of no-light." Certain puranic descriptions also call it "Chakravala" due to its circular shape.

== Geography and Dimensions ==
The cosmological belief dictates that the mountain marks the outermost edge of the cosmological world that is accessible to light. According to the Visnu Purana and other ancient texts, the range stands 10,000 yojanas in both breadth and height. The total diameter of the cosmological world is often cited as 500 million yojanas, and the Lokaloka range is said to occupy 125 million yojanas, roughly one-fourth of that extent.

== Function as Cosmic Boundary ==
The primary characteristic of Lokaloka is its role as the limit of illumination. One side of the mountain is perpetually lit while the exterior side remains in absolute darkness. The mountain serves as a blockade for the security of the residents of the seven dvipas and oceans. To protect the quarters of the cosmological world from malevolent forces, four lokapalas (i.e., guardian deities) reside at the cardinal points of the range: Sudhaman, Sankhapad, Hiranyaroman and Ketumant.
