= Samba (Krishna's son) =

Son of Krishna and Jambavati

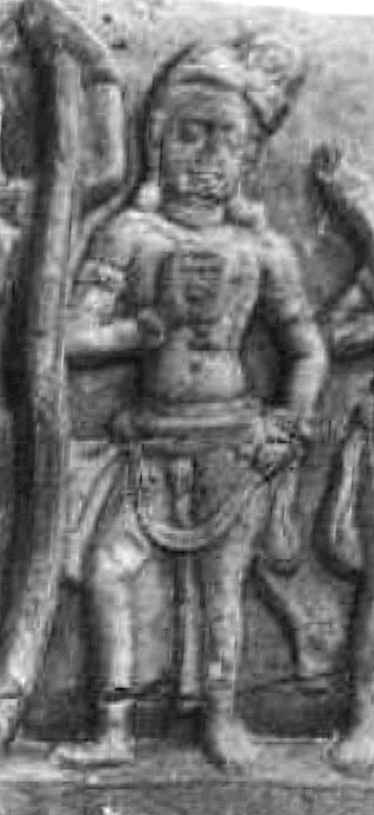
- Samba, holding a cup, in the Kondamotu Vrishni heroes relief, 4th century CE
- Texts: Bhagavata Purana, Devi Bhagavata Purana, Mahabharata, Samba Purana, Skanda Purana
- Gender: Male

Genealogy
- Parents: Krishna (father); Jambavati (mother)
- Spouse: Lakshmanā (daughter of Duryodhana and his Kalingan wife)
- Dynasty: Vrishni heroes

Samba (Sanskrit: साम्ब; IAST: Sāmba) was a son of the Hindu god Krishna and his second consort, Jambavati. According to legend, his prank brought about the end of the Yadu dynasty.

== Early worship ==
In the 1st century BC, there seems to be evidence for a worship of five Vrishni heroes (Balarama, Krishna, Pradyumna, Aniruddha, and Samba), due to the Mora Well Inscription found at Mora near Mathura, which apparently mentions a son of the great satrap Rajuvula, probably the satrap Sodasa and an image of Vrishni, "probably Vasudeva, and of the "Five Warriors". The Brahmi inscription can be seen on the Mora stone slab, now in the Mathura Museum.

== Legend ==
=== Birth ===
The Mahabharata and the Devi Bhagavata Purana narrate the story of the birth of Samba. Jambavati was unhappy when she realized that only she had not given birth to a child while all the other wives had many children. She approached Krishna to find a solution and to be blessed with a son like the handsome Pradyumna, Krishna's first-born son.

Krishna knew this son would herald in the destruction of the Yadu clan, and therefore needed to be a form of Shiva's destructive energy. He went to the hermitage of the sage Upamanyu in the Himalayas and as advised by the sage, he started to pray to Shiva. He performed his penance for six months in various postures; once holding a skull and a rod, then standing on one leg only in the next month and surviving on water only, during the third month he did penance standing on his toes and living on air only. Pleased with the austerities, Shiva finally appeared before Krishna as Samba, (Ardhanarishvara) the half-female, half-male form of the destroyer goddess Parvati, asked him to ask a boon. Krishna then sought a son from Jambavati, which was granted. A son was born soon thereafter, named Samba, the form Shiva had appeared before Krishna.

According to the Bhagavata Purana, Jambavati was the mother of Samba, Sumitra, Purujit, Shatajit, Sahasrajit, Vijaya, Chitraketu, Vasuman, Dravida, and Kratu. The Vishnu Purana says that she has many sons headed by Samba.

=== Marriage ===
Samba grew up to be a nuisance to the race. Lakshmanā, who was the daughter of Duryodhana through his Kalingan wife and the younger sister of Lakshmana had come of age. Her father arranged her svayamvara and many princes came to win her hand. Samba had heard of Lakshmanā and wanted to marry her. He went to her svayamvara and abducted her. He defeated the Kuru maharathis who pursued him but was finally caught. He was arrested by the Kuru elders and thrown in prison.

Lakshmanā's svayamvara was rearranged, but no other prince was willing to marry her, since it was considered that a woman abducted by another man belonged to that man. The princes were actually afraid of the Yadavas who might attack them on Samba's behalf. Balarama, who was fond of his notorious nephew, went to Hastinapura to bail him out. The Kurus refused. Balarama became enraged and started smashing up the palace. Soon after, Duryodhana apologised for their conduct. Balarama was pacified and ordered the Kurus to free Samba. Duryodhana then married his daughter off to Samba. Samba and Lakshmanā had ten children.

=== Curse of Leprosy ===
According to Mahabharata's Mausala Parva, Samba died because some rishis (sages) cursed him that he would die from his father's hand.

In an alternate version of the story, Samba mocked the appearance of the sage Narada. Feeling humiliated, Narada sought to teach Samba a lesson by luring him to the private bathing pool where his stepmothers were bathing. Disturbed by the intrusion, they reported the incident to Krishna. Outraged by his son's perceived impropriety, Krishna cursed Samba to suffer from leprosy.

When Samba asserted his innocence and revealed Narada's deception, Krishna regretted his actions. Since the curse could not be revoked, Krishna advised Samba to worship the sun god Surya to heal him of the disease.

The Samba Purana contains the narrative of Samba getting infected by leprosy, after being cursed by sage Durvasa for mocking him. To seek a cure, Samba underwent penance for 12 years in Mitravana near the banks of the Chandrabhaga River, (identified as the site of the Multan Sun Temple) deep in meditation while chanting prayers to the sun deity Surya. Pleased by his devotion, Surya healed his affliction.

In the Mithila region, he is believed to have built the Kandaha Surya Mandir temple in the state of Bihar to free himself from the curse. In the state of Odisha, India, this day is celebrated as Samba Dashami on the 10th day of the Shukla Paksha of Pausha Masa. On this day, mothers and fathers pray to Surya for the health of their children.

=== Destruction of the Yadava clan ===
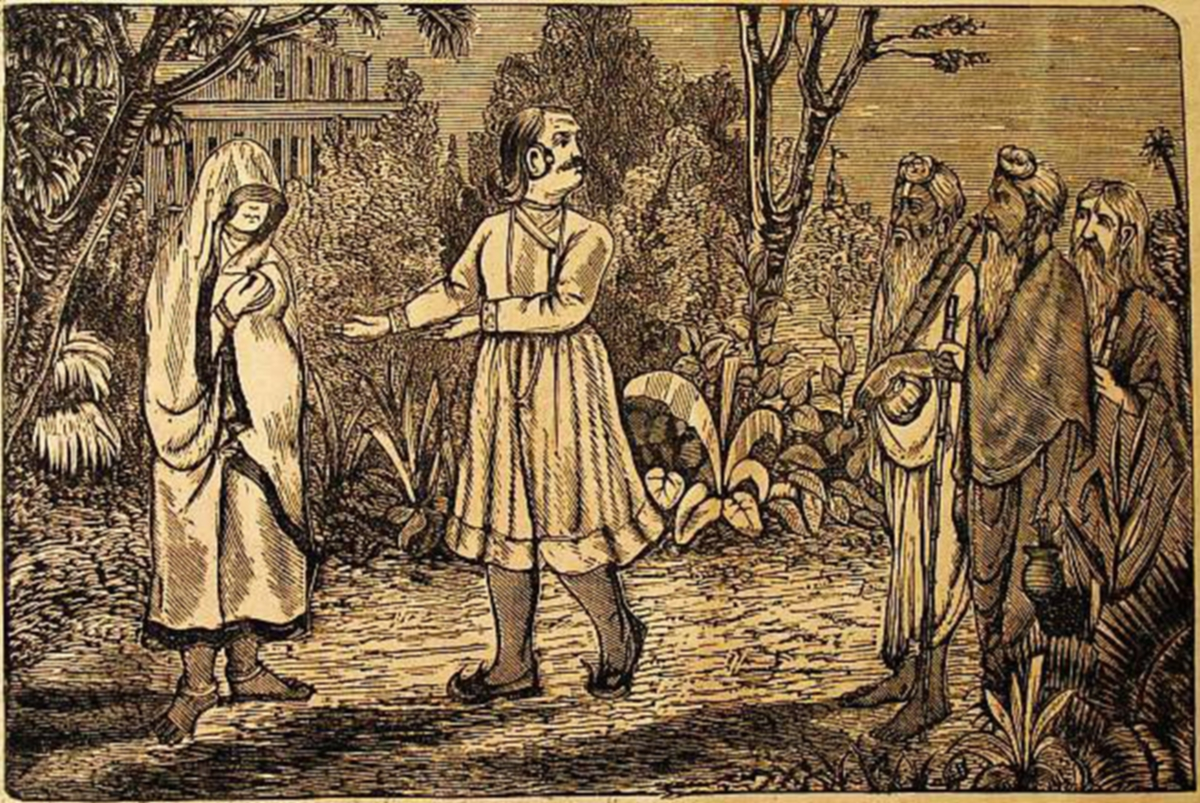
Samba dressed as a pregnant woman being presented to the sages - Illustrations from the Barddhaman edition of Mahabharata.

At the end of the Kurukshetra War, all 100 of Gandhari's sons, the Kauravas, were killed by their cousins, the Pandavas, who were aided by Krishna. The Pandavas also lost all of their sons. Gandhari cursed Krishna for allowing all this destruction to happen. She cursed that he, his city and all his subjects would be destroyed. Krishna accepted the curse.

The book Mausala Parva describes the fulfillment of the curse 36 years after the end of the Kurukshestra War. With Yudhishthira's realm now peaceful and prosperous, the youth of the Yadava clan became frivolous and hedonistic. Samba dressed up as a woman, and his friends met the sages Vishvamitra, Durvasa, Vasishtha, Narada, and others who were visiting Dvaraka for an audience with Krishna. The young man, playfully pretending to be a woman, claimed that he was pregnant and asked the sages to predict the gender of the baby. A sage saw through the prank and, in a fit of rage, cursed that Samba would give birth to an iron bolt (gada, a mace) that would destroy his entire race. As per the curse, the next day, Samba gave birth to an iron rod. The youth informed King Ugrasena of what had happened. Ugrasena ordered Samba to crush the rod into powder and cast it into the Prabhas sea. The powder washed up onto the seashore and grew into long reeds of eraká grass. Later in the story, the Yadavas were at that same seashore for a festival when a fight broke out among them all. Lacking weapons, the Yadavas broke off the erakā grass—which they discovered was as strong as iron—and used it to kill one another. Thus, the iron bolt destroyed the entire Yadava clan.

One larger piece of the bolt was swallowed by a fish. That same fish was caught by a hunter named Jara, who in his past life was Vali in the Ramayana. He removed the iron piece from his catch and noticing that it had a point and arrowhead-like shape, sharpened it as such and stuck it onto the tip of one of his arrows. The hunter Jara mistook Krishna's partly visible left foot for a deer and shot the arrow. The arrow mortally wounded Krishna, resulting in his departure from the earth.

== See also ==
- Multan Sun Temple
- Samba district
- Samba Purana
- Mausala Parva

== Bibliography ==
- Hudson, D. Dennis (2008). The Body of God: An Emperor's Palace for Krishna in Eighth-Century Kanchipuram. Oxford University Press. ISBN 978-0-199-70902-1.
