= Samba Purana =

One of the eighteen minor Puranas

The Samba Purana (Sanskrit: साम्ब पुराण, Sāmba Purāṇa) is one of the Saura Upapuranas. This text is dedicated to Surya. The recension of the text found in the printed editions has 84 chapters. Chapters 53-68 of this text are also divided into 15 Paṭalas.

== Content ==
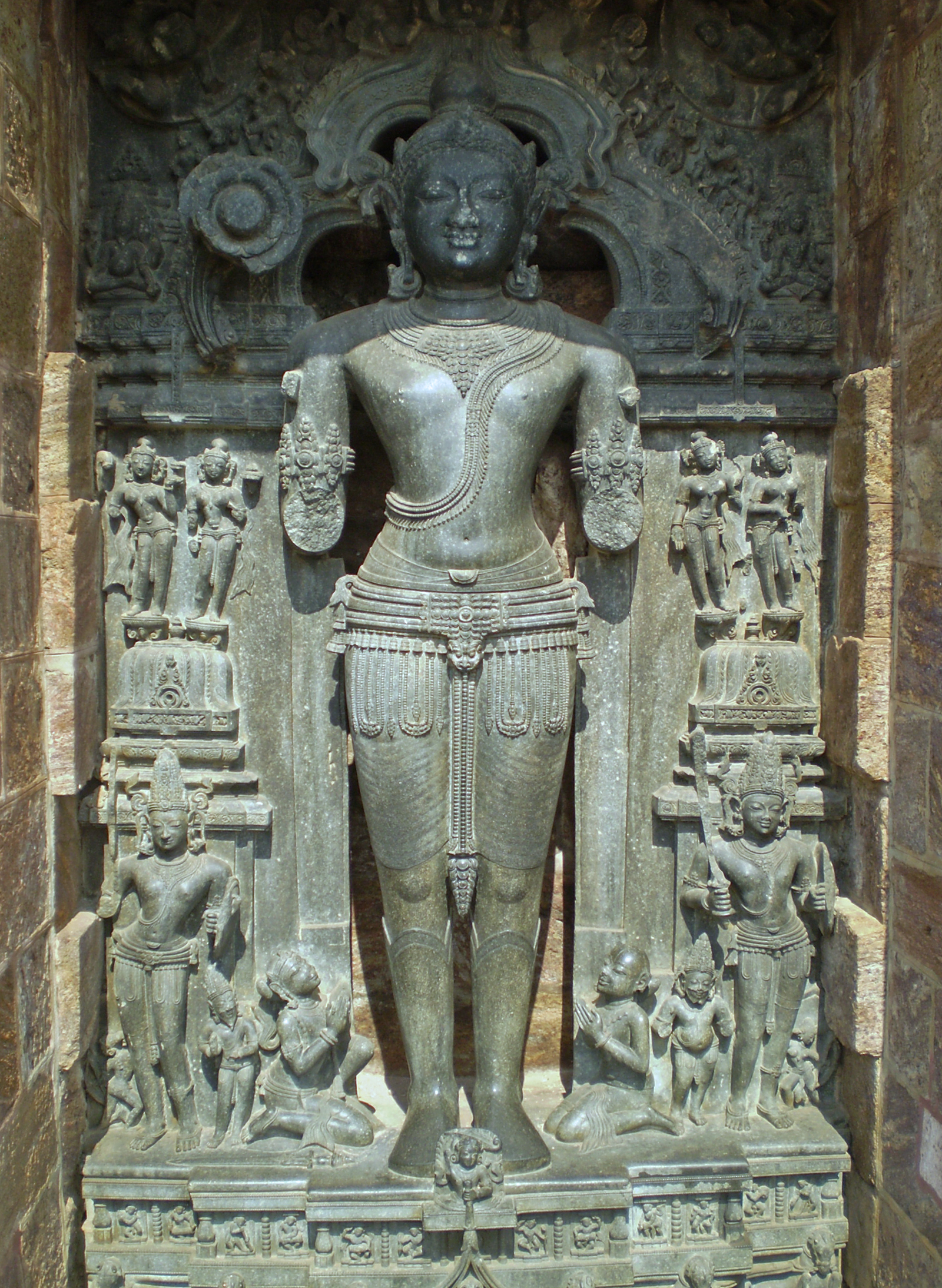
Konark statue of Sun God wearing central Asian boots

Samba Purana is a text dedicated to the worship of Surya, the god of the sun. This text comprises a number of narratives dealing with creation, details of solar system, eclipses, geography of the earth, description of Surya and his attendants, construction of images of these deities, details of yoga, manners and customs, rites and rituals, recitations of mantras, and dāna (generosity).

After the customary beginning in Chapter 1, the text consists the narrative of Krishna's son Samba being infected by leprosy after being cursed by sage Durvasa, and subsequently being cured by worshipping Surya in the temple constructed by him in Mitravana on the banks of the Chandrabhaga at what was Multan Sun Temple. This whole narrative is presented as a conversation between the king Brihadbala of Ikshvaku dynasty and the sage Vashishtha.

In Chapter two, Samba, a son of Krishna was cursed to be afflicted by leprosy. In chapter 5, Samba was then advised by Narada to worship Surya. In Chapter 14, Samba engaged himself in tapas, meditating on Surya at Mitravan (identified by scholars as Multan) which came to be called Sambapur. In chapter 16, Samba discovered an idol of Surya midstream in Chandrabhaga (Chinab) river.

Chapters 26-27 of this text narrate the story of bringing the eighteen Maga Brahmins from Śākadvīpa by Samba and appointing them as the priests of the Surya temple in Mitravana. He is then told in chapter 27 that only the Maga Brahmins in Shakadvipa are capable of worshiping the idol of Surya. Samba then went to Shakadvipa and fetched Maga Brahmins to worship Surya. The Maga are described as reciting the Vedas in a mysterious way, they wear avayanga. They drink homa juice. Samba brought 18 families from Shakadvipa, flying on the divine bird Garuda. The image of Surya explained that it was crafted in Shakadvipa itself, and eventually arrived at Mitravan. Much of the text is devoted to rituals associated with Sun worship.

== History ==
R.C. Hazra in his Studies in the Upapuranas dates Samba Purana between 650 and 850 CE. The text in Brāhmaparvan of the Bhavishya Purana is largely taken from the Samba Purana which is regarded to be older.

=== Govindpur Inscription of Poet Gangadhar ===
An inscription of Saka 1059 (1137-38 CE) was discovered by Cunningham at Govindpur in the Nawada division of the Gaya district. It gives the account of Maga Brahmins being invited by Samba. The scholarly family of Gangadhar belonged to a clan of Maga Brahmins. The inscription confirms that the tradition existed before Saka 1059, confirming the antiquity of the text of Samba Purana. The Gaya region is a major center of the Shakadwipiya Brahmins who use local village names as the exogamous divisions of their community.

== Bibliography ==
- Ahmad, Erfan (2008). Sāmba Purāna: a study (PDF) (Thesis). Aligarh, India: Aligarh Muslim University.
- Dowson, John (5 November 2013) [2000]. A Classical Dictionary of Hindu Mythology, and Religion, Geography, History. Routledge. ISBN 9781136390296.
- Glaesser, Gustav (1969). "Review of Das Bhaviṣyapurāṇa (Münchener Indologische Studien vol. 5)". East and West. 19 (3/4): 511–513. ISSN 0012-8376. JSTOR 29755461.
- Hazra, R.C. (2003) [1962]. "The Upapuranas". In Radhakrishnan, S. (ed.). The Cultural Heritage of India. Vol. 2. Kolkata: The Ramakrishna Mission Institute of Culture. ISBN 81-85843-03-1.
- Hohenberger, Adam (1967). Hoffmann, Helmut (ed.). Das Bhaviṣyapurāṇa. Münchener Indologische Studien. 5 (in German). Wiesbaden: Otto Harrassowitz. ISSN 0077-1880.
- Jha, Bhavanath (2011). An Introduction To The Samba Purana (in Hindi).
- Kielhorn, F. (1894). "Govindpur stone inscription of the poet Gangadhar, the Śaka year 1059". Epigraphia Indica. 2: 330–342.
- Ray, H.C. (1931). Dynastic History Of Northern India. Vol. 1. New Delhi: Munshiram Manoharlal Publishers.
- Tripathi, Shrikrishnamani, ed. (1983). Sāmbapurāṇam (Upapurāṇam). Varanasi: Krishnadas Academy.
