= Multan Sun Temple =

Destroyed Hindu temple in Punjab, Pakistan

Sun Temple of Multan
- Location within Punjab, Pakistan Location within Pakistan Location within Asia

Religion
- Affiliation: Hinduism
- District: Multan
- Deity: Surya

Location
- Location: Multan
- State: Punjab
- Country: Pakistan

Architecture
- Type: Domed

The Sun Temple of Multan was a temple dedicated to Surya, the Hindu Sun-God, in the city of Multan in modern Pakistan. The exact location of the temple remains unknown.

The temple commanded significant fame in the subcontinent — as a place of pilgrimage and wealth — under Hindu as well as Muslim rule and was supposedly destroyed in the late tenth century CE. It appears to have been reconstructed, before being purportedly obliterated by the Mughal Emperor Aurangzeb at some point after 1666.

== Religious significance ==
The earliest extant Hindu text to mention of a solar cult is Samba Purana (c. 7th – 8th century CE) — the legend on the origins of the cult made its way into the Bhavishya Purana and even a twelfth century inscription in eastern India.

After being cursed into a leper, Samba urged Krishna to restore his youth who expressed his inability and deferred to the Sun-God. So, acting upon the advice of Narada, Samba left for the forests of Mitravan on the banks of Chandrabhaga, the sacred abode of Surya. There, he propitiated Surya into appearing before himself and secured a cure but, in return, had to accept setting up a solar temple. The next day, Samba received an icon of Surya while bathing in the river, and subsequently, the first solar temple was established in Sambapura. However, Brahmins fit for worship were found in India and had to be brought for re-establishing a former energy center in the form of the temple.

Sambapura has been since identified with Multan and the temple with the eponymous institution. However, most scholars have come to reject the equivalence following Heinrich von Stietencron. Stietencron notes that formerly, it was not the Chandrabhaga but Ravi that passed by Multan; so, the original town must be at some yet-undetermined site along the older course of Chandrabhaga. Alternatively, the Puranic legend must be a recent interpolation; Chachnama — which purports to be the translation by `Ali Kufi (13th century) of an early eighth century Arabic text—does refer to the temple as Mistravi and Minravi, both of which are derived from Mitravan.

== History ==
The antecedents of the temple remain unknown to historical certainty.

=== Hindu-Buddhist rule ===
Chachnama offers a pre-history of the temple; it was supposedly constructed by Jibawin, a devout Brahmin ruler who went on to bury enviable treasure underneath it. During Xuanzang's visit in 641 C.E., it was the only solar temple in Sindh; for a comparison, he had noted 299 Brahminical temples, a majority of which were of Saivite sect. Xuanzang described (Note: His description went: [V]ery magnificent and profusely decorated. The image of the Surya-deva is cast in yellow gold and ornamented with rare gems. Women play their music, light their torches, offer their flowers and perfumes to it. [..] The kings and high families of the five Indies never fail to make their offerings of gems and precious stones. They have founded a house of mercy, in which they provide food and drink, and medicines for the poor and sick, affording succor and sustenance. Men from all countries come here to offer up their prayers; there are always some thousands doing so. On the four sides of the temple are tanks with flowering groves where one can wander about without restraint.) the temple to have a gem-studded golden idol; attracting pilgrims from far and wide, it was a magnificent structure and was patronaged by the King and the regional elites. Alongside the temple, was a rest house that served to the visitors and the poor.

=== Umayyad conquest ===
During the conquest of Sindh by the Umayyad Caliphate in 8th century under the leadership of Muhammad bin Qasim, Multan fell after a long siege and the Chach dynasty was replaced. Upon the Umayyad conquest, Qasim obtained thirteen thousand and two hundred mans of gold upon excavation. This gain of treasures—by loot or revenue—would lead to Multan being regarded as the "Frontiers of gold" by Arab geographers, well into the fourteenth century.

Al-Baladhuri's Futuh al-Buldan (c. mid-9th century C.E.) remains the earliest narrative-history to cover the history of the temple under Umayyad rule; he noted that all wealth — amounting to thirteen thousand and two hundred maunds of gold — were confiscated from what was the "preeminent site of pilgrimage" for local Sindhis. It was also recorded about how the Sindhis used to shave their beards and head before circumambulating it and offering riches. (Note: For details on the production of Baladhuri's text and its sources, consult Lynch, Ryan J. (August 2021). Arab Conquests and Early Islamic Historiography: The Futuh al-Buldan of al-Baladhuri. I. B. Tauris. ISBN 9780755644681.) Al-Biruni, visiting the site about a century later, would record that the Sun Temple was spared by bin Qasim only after he came to know about its prominent role in the regional economy; nonetheless, a piece of cow-flesh was mockingly hang around the neck of the idol.

Ibn al-Jawzi (c. late 12th century C.E.) noted bin Qasim to have had spared the temple in lieu of rights to a third of its revenues. (Note: The Caliph Abd al-Malik ibn Marwan is held to have had personally consented to this proposal. However, this is an anachronism; the Caliph was long-dead by the time Qasim had his eyes set on Indian frontiers.) Pilgrims were apparently compelled to pay a sum between one hundred and ten thousand dirhams, adjudged according to their financial capacity: a third went to the Muslims per bin Qasim's agreement, another third went to the maintenance of city facilities, and the rest went to the priests. Notably, in spite of being a ferocious polemicist against heretical practices, al-Jawzi did not record any act of defilation. 'Ali al-Shatibi al-Maghribi's (fl.1465 C.E.) history of Arabia reproduced al-Jawzi on the management of the temple except that a third of revenue did not go to Muslims but to the poor.

==== Arab governors ====
Multiple Muslim sources — from voyager-historians like Istakhri, al-Maqdisi, al-Masudi, Ahmad ibn Rustah and Ibn Hawqal to encyclopedists like Ibn al-Nadim — describe the temple especially in the late Abbasid phase. However, their descriptions were mostly gleaned from non-extant sources — including rumors carried by travellers — and hence, often dissonant.

Istakhri (early 10th century) provides the most detailed description of the temple and the idol. The temple commanded pan-sectarian reverence and was located in the most populous part of Multan between the city's ivory and copper-smith bazaars. Wholly draped in red leather except for the eyes and studded with gems, (Note: Al-biruni would note the gems to be rubies but he did not see the (since-destructed) idol.) the idol adorned a crown of gold and sat in a "quadrangular position" on a brick throne under the cupola with fists in the gyan mudra, rested on its knees. He also described how the temple was leveraged by the Muslim rulers as an indemnity against potential invasion by neighbouring Hindu powers. (Note: A millennium later, V. D. Savarkar, the progenitor of Hindutva in India, would lambast the Hindu Kings — and his Brahmin counsel — for having chosen to shy away from military conflict out of a blind reverence for scriptures. In a polemical tract, Savarkar argued that they should have instead pressed forward and threatened the Governor of reciprocation — all mosques in their territory were to be demolished and the Sun Temple was to be rebuilt atop the Kabul Shahi Mosque.) Al-Masudi, a contemporary of Istakhri, reiterates this strategical use of the temple; besides, he notes the ritual offerings — consisting of money, precious stones, perfumes, and especially aloe-wood of Kumar — as the greatest contributor to state revenues.

Ibn Hawqal, yet another contemporary, reproduced Istakhri's narrative in toto but supplanted a detail — perhaps from his own travels — about all revenue being forfeited to the Amir; however, the Amir was noted to have ensured that the priests had sufficient means. Rustah, yet another contemporary, found the temple to be a significant source of revenue especially with rich people dedicating their property to it. The idol was made of iron and 18 metres (20 yd) in length; it was offered with rice, vegetables, and fish. In contrast, al-Nadim's encyclopedic entry in al-Fihrist, noted the idol to be merely 6.4 metres (7 yd) tall. whereas Abu Dulaf al-Yanbu’i not only assigned it a height of a hundred cubits but also asserted it to levitate mid-way between the floor and ceiling of the temple.

Yohanan Friedmann, a scholar of Islamic history, interprets the evidence to attest to the accordance of Hindus with the status of dhimmi. While there appears to have been a total loss of financial autonomy when compared to the days immediately after the conquest, the temple continued to maintain its prominence under Muslim governors, in what Finbarr B. Flood, an art-historian, dubs as a regime of "mercantile cosmopolitanism". (Note: A tenth-century bronze idol of Surya from Mansura attests to the continuity of the solar cult even under Muslim rule. Mints of Arabic Governors had both Hindu and Islamic inscriptions on the obverse, probably pointing to a heteropraxic governance.)

=== Ismaili emirs ===
With the increasing influence of Fatimid Caliphate in the frontiers of Persia, arrived Jalam (variant Halam) in 959, to replace the old Da'ai who had not only exhibited "reprehensible syncretism" by allowing neo-converts to maintain their traditional practices but also disputed the noble origins of the Fatimids. Jalam took to preaching Isma'ilism aggressively and obtained success; (Note: Al-Muqaddasi, visiting Multan in 985, found the majority to be Shi'as.) he would have the ruling dynasty switch their allegiance from the Abbasids to Fatimids soon. (Note: Older historians have generally (and incorrectly) assumed Jalan to have usurped power by overthrowing the Abbasid sovereigns.)

Circa 965, a letter from the Fatimid caliph congratulated Jalam on destroying a (unknown) temple and constructing a mosque on the site. This has been understood by some to refer to the destruction of the Sun Temple, especially in light of al-Biruni explicitly holding Jalam responsible for the event and assassination of all priests, writing only a few decades hence. (Note: The old mosque was also shut, which would be only restored by Mahmud of Ghazni during the sacking of Sindh, c. 1005.) However, Maqdisi — a pro-Fatimid geographer — who had visited Multan circa 985 and recorded a host of novel information about the Shi'ite inhabitants, reiterated Istakhri's observations about the Sun Temple, including locational specifics. Thus, Maclean argues that it could not have been the Sun Temple which was mentioned in the letter; had the site been transformed into an Ismaili mosque, al-Maqdisi would have found it worthy of mention and it is also improbable that the local Hindus reconstructed the temple in the intervening years since it would have involved demolition of a royal mosque.

The Sun Temple was demolished only after al-Maqdisi's visit, perhaps during Mahmud's brutal conquest of the city c. 1010 C.E. (Note: Notably, the Hindu Shahis and Multan Emirate had entered into a strategic alliance in the wake of Mahmud's invasions. Describing Mahmud's assaults on Multan, the focus of his court chroniclers remained on the suppression of the Ismai'li heretics; thousands were supposedly killed and the main Shi'a mosque was abandoned.) Al-Biruni, visiting the site in early 11th century, came across desolate ruins. Two centuries hence, Muhammad al-Idrisi's geographical compendium (mid 12th century C.E.) not only reproduced Istakhri's narrative in entirety but also added that the temple dome was gilded and that the idol — of unknown antiquity — had four arms; besides the Hindus in Sindh were apparently only concentrated around the temple. However, al-Idrisi had never visited Multan and probably did not have access to al-Biruni's work; the novel additions were likely to have been from older non-extant travelogues. Ibn al-Athir, a contemporary who probably did not visit Multan either, held the idol to be of Job. A century later, Zakariya al-Qazwini's Āthār noted the temple to be the Mecca for Hindus and would reiterate — relying on received knowledge — that the only Hindus in the region were those who lived in the temple.

=== Late-Mughal and Colonial India ===
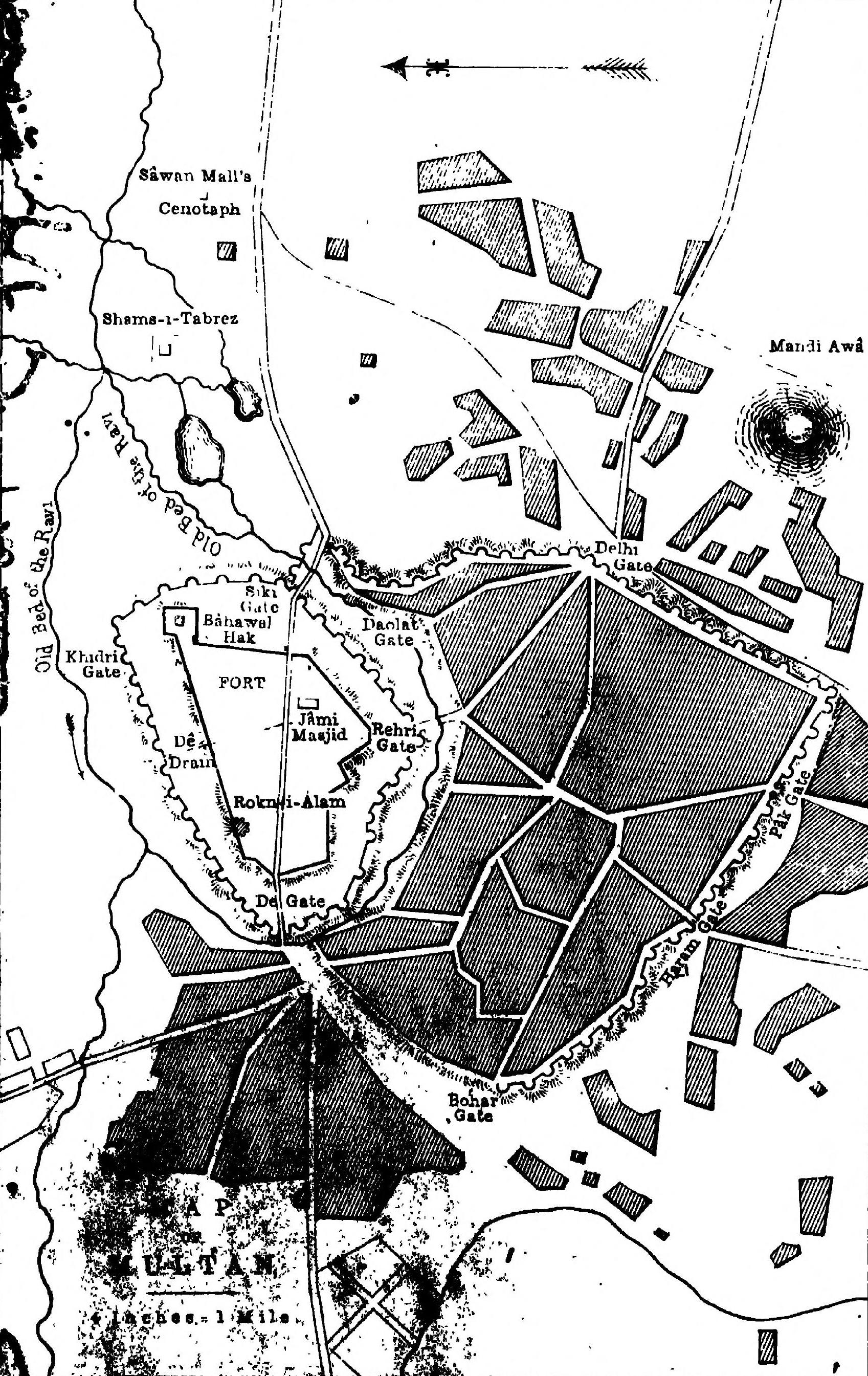
Cunningham's map of the fort complex.

In 1640s, Jean-Baptiste Tavernier travelled across Multan on way to Delhi but did not record any information about the temple. However, Jean de Thévenot visiting Multan in 1666, under Aurzangzeb's rule (1658–1707), mentioned a Hindu temple (Note: The precise term was "Catry Pagoda".) — attracting pilgrims from far and wide — whose offerings contributed to the provincial exchequer; the description of the idol ran similar to Istakhri's though he claimed ignorance about the identity of deity. Thus, it appears that the temple was restored at an unknown time.

Alexander Cunningham, visiting Multan in 1853, noted local tradition to blame Aurangzeb for destructing the temple though no inhabitant was able to identify the site; (Note: Tradition accuses Aurangzeb of having massacred thousands of Hindus in Multan for their rampant desecration of Muslim shrines. From what is known to historical certainty, Aurangzeb, in his days as a Governor of Multan (1648–1652), had fostered cordial relationships with prominent local Muslims; Dara Shukoh failed to win Multan's support for his bid to the Mughal throne despite his offer to pay twenty-five thousand rupees to the Shrine of Bahauddin Zakariya.) he was also told that the Sikhs, upon not finding a trace of the temple when Ranjit Singh had occupied the town in 1818, converted a venerated tomb to a Gurdwara. (Note: The mausoleum is supposed to house the remains of Pir Shams (fl. 12th century), an Ismaili preacher of Iranian descent who was sent by the imams of Alamut and played an important role in the spread of Satpanth. However, local traditions dispute this and claim an association of the tomb with Shams Tabrizi, who is argued to have not died in Qonya but escaped to Multan by "walking on the sea.") That the fort-complex had a Dé gate and Dé drain which led directly to the recently-destructed Jami Masjid, he reasoned the site to be the original spot of the temple. (Note: Not to be confused with the Shahi Eid Gah Mosque. It is not known when and by whom was the Jami Masjid commissioned. The mosque got re-provisioned into a powder magazine by Diwan Mulraj's forces during the Siege of Multan and was blown up on the morning of 30 December 1848 upon being shelled by East India Company. The explosion destroyed many other structures inside and outside the fort, combusted the granary, and killed hundreds. Charlie Pollard, an officer of the Bengal Engineers gave a vivid description: I saw an extraordinary dense mass, black as ink, with a clearly defined outline, rising slowly out of the fort. Gradually as it rose the upper part spread out assuming the form of a gigantic tree, but losing its sharp outline in upper air till it became a dark brown cloud hanging as a pall over the fort and city. It was evident too that within that dark mass were certain solid bodies, whether the debris of building or human beings it was impossible to say, hurled some hundreds of feet upwards and looking like specks in the air...) However, it is doubtful if Cunningham was accurate; his claim of coming across coins of local rulers, from around the site, inscribed with the Sun God, has been rejected by modern scholars.

== See also ==
- Prahladpuri Temple
