= Dvipa =

Term in Hindu cosmography

Dvipa (Sanskrit: द्वीप, lit. 'island', IAST: Dvīpa) is a term in Hindu cosmography. The Puranas describe a dvipa to be one of the seven islands or continents that are present on Earth, each of them surrounded by an ocean. The same terminology is also used to refer to the seven regions of the cosmos.

In the geocentric model of Hinduism, the seven dvipas are present around Mount Meru, which is present at the centre of Jambudvipa, the term employed for the Indian subcontinent. Dvipa is also sometimes used to refer to the abodes of deities, such as Manidvipa.

== Etymology ==
The word dvipa is a portmanteau of the Sanskrit words dvī (two) and apa (water), meaning "having water on two sides". As per Mātaṅgalīlā, it can also refer to "elephants" if translated as "the one who drinks twice". It is cognate with the Young Avestan 'duuaēpa', which means the same.

== Description ==
According to the Matsya Purana and the Bhagavata Purana, the world is divided into seven dvipas, termed as the sapta-dvīpa (the seven islands). The Mahabharata names the following as the seven islands of the world:

Name	Ocean	Etymology
Jambudvīpa	Lavaṇoda	Syzygium cumini
Plakṣadvīpa	Ikṣurasa	Ficus religiosa
Śālmaladvīpa	Suroda	Bombax tree
Kuśadvīpa	Ghṛta	Desmotachya bipinnata
Krauñcadvīpa	Kṣīroda	The Krauñca hill
Śākadvīpa	Dadhi	Teak
Puṣkaradvīpa	Jala	Lotus

The British author Benjamin Walker offers the following description of the dvipas:

Beneath the celestial regions, the earth is arranged in these seven concentric rings of island continents.

- Jambudvipa is the innermost of these island continents, shaped like a disc. The earth rests upon the head of Shesha, the cosmic serpent, who is himself supported by the tortoise named Akupara, who is supported by the Ashtadiggajas, the eight celestial elephants that stand on the shell of Brahmanda.
- Plaksha is the second of the ring-shaped continents, surrounded by a sea of sugarcane juice.
- Shalmala is the third of the ring-shaped continents, surrounded by a sea of wine.
- Kusha is the fourth of the ring-shaped continents, surrounded by a sea of clarified butter (ghee).
- Krauncha is the fifth of the ring-shaped continents, surrounded by a sea of curds.
- Shaka or Shveta is the sixth of the ring-shaped continents, whose shores are surrounded by a sea of milk.
- Pushkara is the seventh of the ring-shaped continents, surrounded by a huge circular sea of freshwater.

Bordering the outermost sea is a land named Lokāloka, which separates the known world from the world of darkness. This realm comprises a range of mountains ten thousand yojanas high. The shell of the cosmic egg known as Brahmanda lies beyond this darkness, cradling all of creation.

== Literature ==
=== Brahma Purana ===
The Brahma Purana describes the sapta-dvīpa as such:

O brahmins, there are seven continents viz—Jambū, Plakṣa, Śālmala, Kuśa, Krauñca, Śāka and Puṣkara. The Jambūdvīpa is situated in the middle. In its centre, O leading brahmins, is the Meru the mountain of gold.

— Chapter 16

=== Chaitanya Charitamrita ===
The Bengali text Chaitanya Charitamrita, written c. 1557, describes the concept in the following manner:

"The "planets" are called dvīpas.
Outer space is like an ocean of air.
Just as there are islands in the watery ocean,
these planets in the ocean of space are called dvīpas, or islands in outer space"
— Chaitanya Caritamrita Madhya 20.218, Purport

== See also ==
- Jambudvipa
- Manidvipa
- Shakadvipa
- Kshira Sagara
