= Bhavishya Purana =

Medieval era Sanskrit text, one of twenty major Puranas

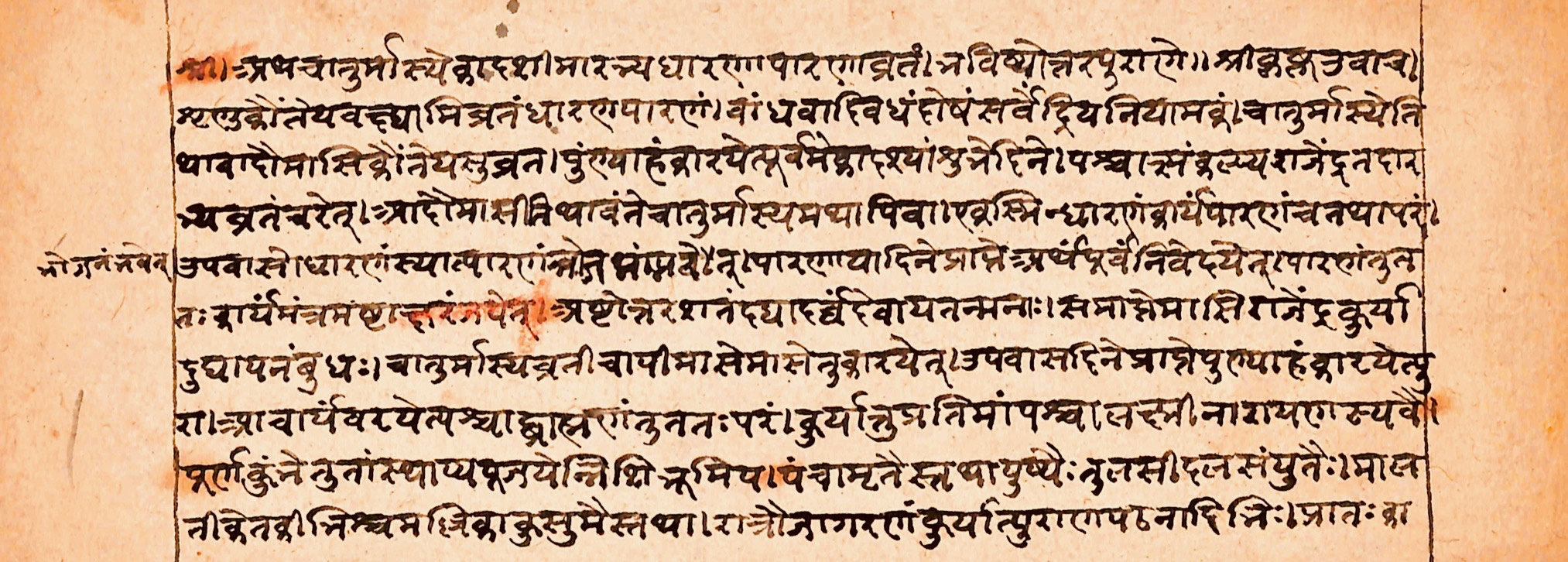
A page from the Bhavishyottara section of Bhavishya Purana (Sanskrit, Devanagari)

The 'Bhavishya Purana' (Bhaviṣya Purāṇa) is one of the eighteen major works in the Purana genre of Hinduism, written in Sanskrit. The title Bhavishya means "future" and implies it is a work that contains prophecies regarding the future.

The Bhavishya Purana exists in many inconsistent versions, wherein the content as well as their subdivisions vary, and five major versions are known. Some manuscripts have four Parvam (parts), some two, others don't have any parts. The text as it exists today is a composite of material ranging from medieval era to the modern era. Those sections of the surviving manuscripts that are dated to be older, are partly borrowed from other Indian texts such as Brihat Samhita and Shamba Purana. The veracity and authenticity of much of the Bhavishya Purana has been questioned by modern scholars and historians, and the text is considered an example of "constant revisions and living nature" of Puranic genre of Hindu literature.

The first 16 chapters of the first part of the Bhavishya Purana is called Brahmaparvam. It shows similarities to, and likely borrowed verses from some version of the Manusmriti. However, some of the caste-related and women's rights related discussion in the Bhavishya Purana is egalitarian and challenge those found in the 19th century published manuscripts of the Manusmriti. The second part of the text, called Madhyamaparvan, is a Tantra-related work. The "prophecy"-related third part Pratisargaparvan includes sections on Christianity, Islam, Bhakti movement, Sikhism, Delhi Sultanate history, Mughal history, British rule, and others. The fourth part of the text called Uttaraparvam, is also known as Bhavishyottara Purana. This last part describes festivals related to various Hindu gods and goddesses and their Tithis (dates on lunar calendar), as well as mythology and a discussion of Dharma, particularly vrata (vow) and dāna (charity). The text also has many Mahatmya chapters on geography, travel guide and pilgrimage to holy sites such as Uthiramerur, and is one of the Tirtha-focussed Puranas.

== Manuscripts ==
The Bombay edition contains:

- Brahma Parva which has 215 chapters.
- Madhyama Parva which has three sections with a cumulative total of 62 chapters,
- Pratisarga Parva which has four sections with 7, 35, 32 and 26 chapters respectively, and
- Uttara Parva which has 208 chapters.

Some manuscripts of the text do not have these Parvans and have different number of chapters. A few manuscripts assert that it has five parts (Sanskrit: parvam), but all extant editions contain only the above four parts. The text is sometimes titled Bhaviṣyat Purāṇa.

=== Dating ===
In records of land grants of the fifth century CE, verses are quoted which occur only in the Padma, Bhavishya, and Brahma Puranas. On this basis Pargiter in 1912 assigned these particular Puranas to the early centuries CE. However, Moriz Winternitz considers it more probable that these verses, both in the inscriptions and in the puranas, were taken as quotations from now nonextant dharmaśāstras. According to Winternitz, the text which has come down to us in manuscript form is certainly not the ancient work which is quoted in the Āpastambīya Dharmasūtra ; post quemtation attributed to the Bhaviṣyat Purāṇa cannot be found anymore in extant editions.

It is now accepted that the four parts have different dates. However, Puranic scholars have increasingly arrived at a consensus that it is impossible to meaningfully date most of the Puranic corpus due to their extremely fluid nature. Gustav Glaesser reiterates this argument to highlight how the surviving manuscripts of Bhavishya Purana are neither the ancient nor a medieval version of some original Bhavishya Purana.

== Contents ==
Despite being labelled a purana or "tales of ancient times", the work relates only a few legends. It is one of several puranas in which a list of royal dynasties of the "past" are followed by lists of kings predicted to rule in the future.

The first 16 chapters of the first part of the Bhavishya Purana is called Brahmaparvam. The second part of the text, called Madhyamaparvan, is a Tantra-related work. The "prophecy"-related third part Pratisargaparvan includes sections on comparing Upanishadic ideas to those found in non-Indic religions, as well as a history through the 18th century. It is considered by scholars as an 18th or 19th century creation. The fourth part of the text called Uttaraparvam, is also known as Bhavishyottara Purana. This last part describes festivals, vrata (vow), dāna (charity) and tīrtha (pilgrimage sites).

In the Padma Purana, it is classified in the rajas category, which contains puranas related to Brahma. Scholars consider the Sattva-Rajas-Tamas classification as "entirely fanciful" and there is nothing in this text that actually justifies this classification.

=== Brāhma Parva ===
This part of the text has 215 chapters. It covers topics such as rites of passage, ceremonies and feasts. It also covers the duties and rights of women, a discussion on the nature of people and how to identify good and bad characters, and a caste-related discussion. According to Arora, and other scholars, the caste-related and women's rights related discussion in the Bhavishya Purana is egalitarian, similar to those found in Brahma Purana and Vajrasuchi Upanishad, thus challenging Manusmriti.

The Brahma Parva also includes sections on festival dates and methods for worshipping Brahma, Ganesha, Skanda, and the Nāga. A considerable section deals with sun-worship in a place called "Śākadvīpa" which may be a reference to Scythia. This overlaps with Zoroastrianism-related views, and may be related to ancient migration or interaction between Persia and Central Asia with Indian subcontinent. These chapters are the most comprehensive and important source of sun-worship tradition in India, and may be related to the escape and resettlement of people from Persia into western India during the mid to late medieval era.

=== Madhyama Parva ===
The second part of the Bhavishya Purana has 62 chapters on Tantra.

This is not mentioned in other Indian text, states Hazra, to have been a part of the Bhavishya Purana, and therefore might be "a late appendage" abounding in Tantric theories of the 2nd millennium. However, states Rocher, these sections were likely integrated by about 1500 CE.

=== Pratisarga Parva ===
The Pratisarga Parva has 100 chapters, which deal with topics such as the genealogy of the kings and sages, and prophecies. It is written as a universal history with the first and the second chapters (called khaṇḍas) dealing with old time, the third part with the medieval, and the fourth with the new age. The text includes the plundering of regions and major massacres in India after the 12th century, including those of Timur in section 3.4.6 (the text calls him Timiralinga, or "linga of darkness"). It compares "Upanishadic" religion with the religions of the mlēcchas in a way "comparative religions" studies do, states Alf Hiltebeitel, along with historical characters whose ideas and actions impacted India between the 11th and 14th centuries. It includes critical comments about the Mughal history (the texts calls them "Mukula") and refers to a Mahāmada who is a Last Prophet of the "mlēcchas". This suggests this section was written well after the 14th century. The author of this parvan of the Bhavishya Purana seems to know both English Biblical and Arabic Islamic texts, but virtually all terms used here are derived from Arabic words and names, not the English sources. Thus, this part of the text must have been composed after the start of the Mughal empire and after Arabic sources were available in India. This section has led numerous scholars to question the authenticity of much of the Bhavishya Purana, and as evidence that these Puranas were not scriptures, but rather a document of history that was constantly revised and thus of a living nature, both over time and over geography.

According to Alf Hiltebeitel, the second quarter of the eighteenth century marks the terminus post quem for the text's history of the Mughals because it mentions Nadir Shah (calling him Daitya Nadira) and Muhammad Shah in section 3.4.22. This c. mid-18th century terminus post quem would also apply to Pratisargaparvan's first khaṇḍa Genesis-Exodus sequence where its author is aware of both Arabic and English sources. Further, mention of Queen Victoria's palaces, Calcutta and several 18th century historic events place the terminus post quem (completed before a year) at mid to late 19th Century. Hiltebeitel states that this part of the Bhavishya Purana was mostly likely composed in the 19th century.

==== Mahāmada or Muḥammad ====
The mention of Mahāmada or Muḥammad appears in the passage that is taken from Pratisarga Parva (Parva 3, Khanda 3, Adhya 3) as the reincarnation of a demon & the lowest of scums.

Shri Suta Goswami said that a demon called Tripurasura who was earlier burnt to ashes by Shiva has taken birth again in form of Mahāmada (Muḥammad) and his deeds are like that of an evil ghost. The ghost was rebuked by Kalidasa as "O rascal, you have created an illusion to bewilder the king, I will kill you, you are the lowest."

Mahāmada said to Raja Bhoja: "O king, your religion is of course known as the best religion among all. Still I am going to establish a terrible and demoniac religion by the order of the Lord. The symptoms of my followers will be that they first of all will cut their genitals, have no shikha, but having beard, be wicked, make noise loudly and eat everything. They should eat animals without performing any rituals. They will perform purificatory act with the musala or a pestle as you purify your things with kusha. Therefore, they will be known as Musalmān (Muslim), the corrupters of religion. Thus the demoniac religion will be founded by me."

=== Uttara Parva ===
The Uttara Parva is large with 208 chapters. Though nominally attached to the Bhavishya Purana, is usually considered to be an independent work, also known as the Bhaviṣyottara Purāṇa, and as such is included among the Upapuranas (Lesser Puranas). The Bhaviṣyottara Purana is primarily a handbook of religious rites with a few legends and myths. Rajendra Hazra characterizes it as "a loose collection of materials taken from various sources" that is lacking in many of the traditional five characteristics of a purana, but which offers an interesting study of vows, festivals, and donations from sociological and religious point of view.

The Bhavishya Purana also includes Mahātmya (travel guides) to pilgrimage sites such as Uthiramerur.

== Influences ==
Indologist Theodor Aufrecht had noted the Bombay manuscript edition to be a modern era "literary fraud" that plagiarized excerpts from the Pentateuch (Bible) brought to India by early missionaries. According to Gustav Glaesser, this should not be considered "fraud" because such borrowing from all sorts of sources, interpolations and additions are common in the Puranas genre. (Note: Samba Purana, for example, borrows heavily from late medieval era non-Indic texts.) In the same way, the Bhavishya Purana takes ideas from Semitic, Mesopotamian, Persian, Christian and other sources. This is evidenced by the use of words in Bhavishya Purana that are neither Sanskrit nor Prakrit, such as, Falgun (for February), shashtihi (for sixty) and others.

== See also ==
- Bhagavata Purana
- Shiva Purana
- Markandeya Purana
- Upanishads
