= Brahma Purana =

Medieval era Sanskrit text, one of eighteen major Puranas

The Brahma Purana (Sanskrit: ब्रह्मपुराण or ब्राह्मपुराण; Brahma-Purana) is one of the eighteen major Puranas collections of Hindu texts in Sanskrit. It is listed as the first Mahapurana in all anthologies, and is therefore also called Adi Purana. Another title for this text is Saura Purana, because it includes many chapters related to Surya, the sun god. The Brahma Purana is a compilation of geographical Mahatmya (travel guides) (Note: Quote: "The Earliest Promotional Works Aimed At Tourists From That Era Were Called Mahatmyas.") and sections on diverse topics.

== History ==
The Brahma Purana holds an established place as a Mahapurana, however, scholars debate whether the current version of the Brahma Purana is the original Mahapurana or a later Upapurana (secondary Purana). R. C. Hazra through textual analysis, argues that the current version is not the original Brahma Purana but a later compilation that shared the same name. Hazra's conclusion stems from his examination of quotations made by classical Nibandha writers—who frequently quoted verses of the Brahma Purana which cannot be found in the present text. This suggests that the current version may have replaced or is being conflated with an earlier, now-lost version of the Brahma Purana. Hazra believes the extant text was compiled no earlier than the 10th century AD, integrating material from other Puranas and epics such as the Vishnu Purana, Markandeya Purana, Vayu Purana, and the Mahabharata.

In contrast, Surabhi Trivedi, author of The Brahma Purana (critical study), argues that the Brahma Purana meets all traditional criteria for a Mahapurana, which are known as the five characteristics, or Pancha Lakshana (pañcalakṣaṇa). Trivedi argues that there is no compelling reason to downgrade it to an Upapurana given the text's adherence to the established structure and content of a Mahapurana

Other scholars, including Moriz Winternitz and Bibek Debroy hold that while the extant Brahma Purana is likely not the original composition, it contains elements that can be traced to the older one. Debroy, who authored the two-volume Brahma Purana in English published by Penguin, agrees with Hazra's analysis of the Purana corpus, but cautions against making the deduction that the Brahma Purana is copied from other texts, since the various texts could have had a common origin. There are elements of the Brahma Purana that according to Debroy, are likely dated to a range of ~1500 CE and read like "Sthala" Puranas, which glorify a specific location or region rather than a Mahapurana

Since it mentions the existence of the Konark Sun Temple built in 1241, most of the chapter on pilgrimage sites in Orissa couldn't have been written before the 13th century. However, Debroy does not put much weight upon such dating assumptions, since it is difficult to confirm whether the temple referenced in the text is indeed the one constructed in the mid-13th century by Narasimhadeva I of the Ganga dynasty. Debroy suggests it is plausible that an earlier Sun Temple existed at the site, which was superseded in fame by the new temple, or the old temple was itself rebuilt by Narasimhadeva I.

The surviving manuscripts comprise 245 chapters. It is divided into two parts: the Purvabhaga (Former Part) and the Uttarabhaga (Latter Part). Sohnen and Schreiner published a summary of the Brahma Purana in 1989.

== Content ==
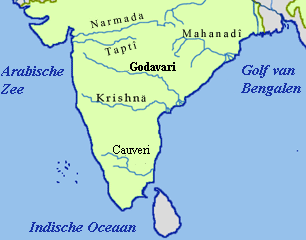
The Brahma Purana dedicates a majority of its chapters to describing the geography, temples and scenes around the Godavari river and of Odisha.

The text is notable for dedicating over 60% of its chapters on description of geography and holy sites of Godavari River Region, as well as places in and around modern Odisha, and tributaries of Chambal River in Rajasthan. These travel guide-like sections are non-sectarian, and celebrates sites and temples related to Vishnu, Shiva, Devi and Surya. The coverage of Jagannath (Krishna, Vishnu-related) temples, however, is larger than the other three, leading scholars to the hypothesis that the authors of extant manuscripts may have been authors belonging to Vaishnavism. Its presentation of the Konark Sun Temple is notable.

The text also describes the Seven Continents (Sapta-Dvipa) and sub-continents of the world, though some other land mass are not mentioned, those which are mentioned are called:

- Jambu—It is the central one of the seven continents surrounding the Mountain Meru, so called either from the Jambu trees abounding in it or from an enormous Jambu tree on Mount Meru visible like a standard to the whole continent. Sec S. M. Ali, Op. cit., chapters V-VII on Jambudvipa.
- Saka can be identified with Malaya, Siam, Indo-China and Southern China or the South-Eastern corner of the land mass of which Jambudvipa occupied the centre.
- Kusa contains Iran, Iraq and the south-western corner of the land mass round Meru.
- Plaksa identified with the basin of Mediterranean since Plaksa or the Pakhara tree is the characteristic of warm temperate or Mediterranean lands identifiable with Greece and adjoining lands.
- Puskara covers the whole of Japan, Manchuria and the south-eastern Siberia.
- Salmala—the tropical part of Africa bordering the Indian Ocean on the West. It includes Madagascar which is the Hariṇa of the Puranas and the Samkhadvipa of some other writers who write similar scriptures.
- Kraunca represents by the basin of the Black Sea.
- Upadvipas (Sub-Continents): 1) Bharata 2) Kimpurusa 3) Harivarsa 4) Ramyaka 5) Hiranmaya 6) Uttarakuru 7) Ilavrta 8) Bhadrasva and 9) Ketumala. According to P.E. (p. 342) there are eight long mountain ranges which divide the island Jambu into 9 countries which look like nine petals of the lotus flower. The two countries of the north and south extremities (Bhadra and Ketumala) are in a bow-shape. The four of the remaining seven are longer than the rest. The central country is known as Ilavrta.

Out of 245 chapters, 18 chapters of the Brahma Purana cover cosmology, mythology, genealogy, manvantara (cosmic time cycles) and topics that are required to make a text belong to the Puranic genre of literature. Other chapters cover Sanskara, a summary of Dharmasastra, its theories on the geography of earth, a summary of the Samkhya and Yoga theories of Hindu philosophy, and other topics. While many chapters of The Brahma Purana praise temples and pilgrimage, chapters 38-40 of the text, a part of embedded Saura Purana, present arguments that are highly critical of the theistic theories and devotional worship proposals of 13th-century Madhvacharya and Dvaita Vedanta sub-school of Hindu philosophies.

Shiva Is Atman (Soul, Self).

— Brahma Purana

The Padma Purana categorizes Brahma Purana as a Rajas Purana, implying the text is related to Brahma, but extant manuscripts have nothing to do with Brahma. Scholars consider the Sattva-Rajas-Tamas classification as "Entirely Fanciful" and there is nothing in this text that actually justifies this classification.

The manuscripts of travel guide to Godavari-River Region from this Purana is found as a separate text, and is called Gautami-Mahatmya or Godavari-Mahatmya, while the one corresponding to Rajasthan region is called Brahmottara Purana. The tradition and other Puranas assert The Brahma Purana had 10,000 verses, but the surviving manuscripts contain between 7,000 and 8,000 verses exclusive of the Brahmottara Purana supplement which adds between 2,000 and 3,000 verses depending on different versions of the same text.

== See also ==
- Brahma
- Bhagavata Purana
- Vishnu Purana
- Shiva Purana
- Markandeya Purana
- Gudhi Padwa

== Bibliography ==
- Bailey, Gregory (2003). Sharma, Arvind (ed.). The Study of Hinduism. University of South Carolina Press. ISBN 978-1-57003-449-7.
- Dalal, Rosen (2014). Hinduism: An Alphabetical Guide. Penguin. ISBN 978-8184752779.
- Gietz, K P; et al. (1992). Epic and Puranic Bibliography (Up to 1985) Annotated and with Indexes: Part I: A - R, Part II: S - Z, Indexes. Otto Harrassowitz Verlag. ISBN 978-3-447-03028-1.
- Glucklich, Ariel (2008). The Strides of Vishnu: Hindu Culture in Historical Perspective: Hindu Culture in Historical Perspective. Oxford University Press. ISBN 978-0-19-971825-2.
- Hazra, Rajendra Chandra (1940). Studies in the Puranic Records on Hindu Rites and Customs. Motilal Banarsidass (1987 Reprint). ISBN 978-81-208-0422-7.
- Jahn, W (1900). Das Saurapuranam: ein Kompendium spaetindischer Kulturgeschichte und des 'Sivaismus' (in German). Strassburg: Walter de Gruyter. ISBN 978-3111154480.
- Rocher, Ludo (1986). The Purāṇas. Wiesbaden: Otto Harrassowitz Verlag. ISBN 978-3447025225.
- Söhnen, Renate; Schreiner, Peter (1989). Brahmapurāṇa. Otto Harrassowitz Verlag. ISBN 978-3-447-02960-5.
- Wilson, H. H. (1864). The Vishnu Purana: A System of Hindu Mythology and Tradition (Volume 1: Introduction, Book I). Read Country Books (reprinted in 2006). ISBN 1-84664-664-2.
- Winternitz, Maurice (1922). History of Indian Literature Vol 1 (Original in German, translated into English by VS Sarma, 1981). New Delhi: Motilal Banarsidass (Reprint 2010). ISBN 978-8120802643.
