= Bloody Bastion =

Coordinates: 30°11′14″N 71°28′30″E

Bloody Bastion خونی برج
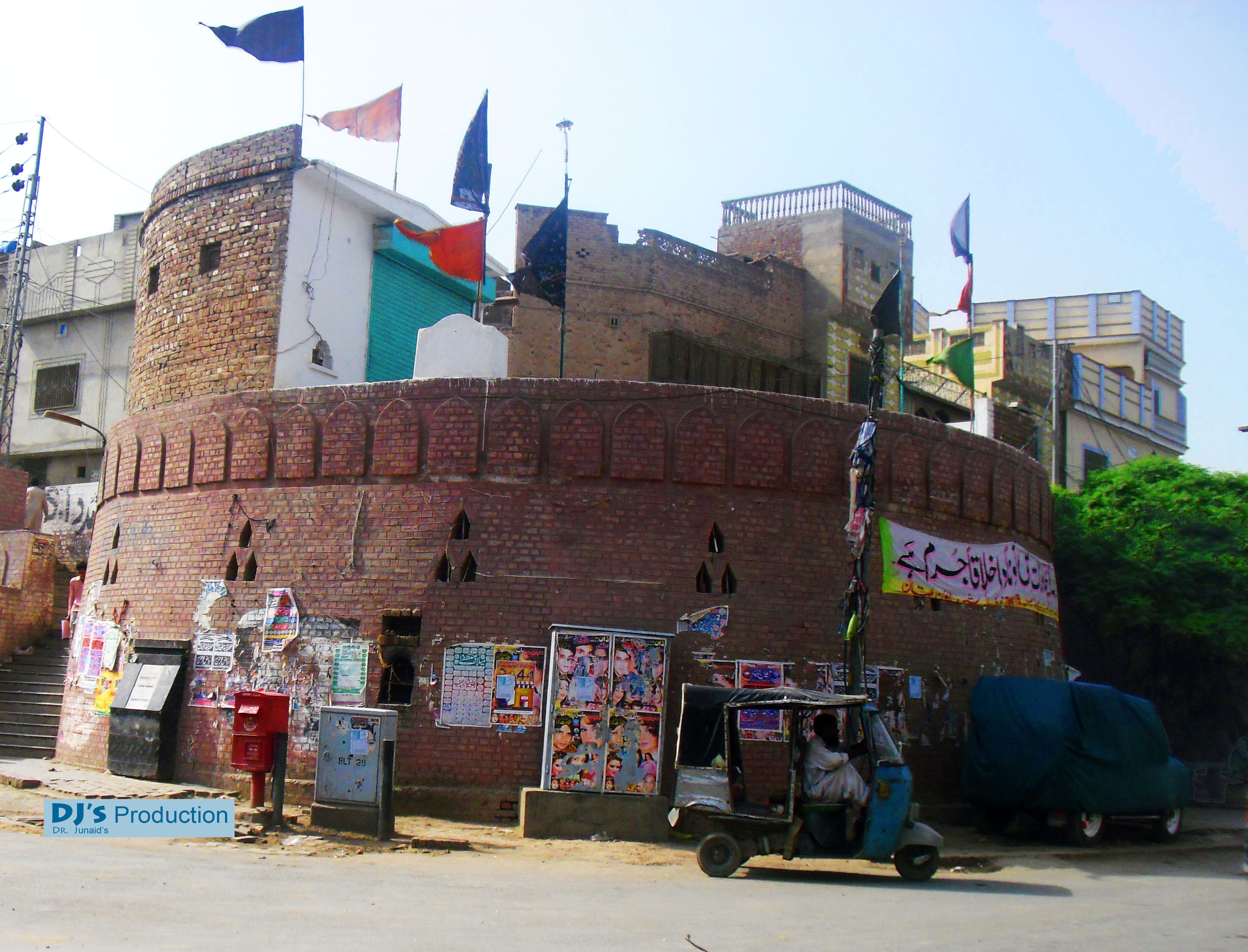
- Interactive map of the Bloody Bastion خونی برج area

General information
- Status: Completed
- Type: Fortification
- Location: Alang Khooni Burj Street, Multan, Pakistan

Bloody Bastion (Urdu: خونی برج), also called Khooni Burj or Bloody Tower, is a bastion in the old City Wall of Multan, between Pak Gate and Delhi Gate on Alang Road in Multan. The tower is a remnant of the city's fortifications that were destroyed by the British in 1849.

Alexander the Great is traditionally believed to have been injured at the site of the modern bastion during his invasion of the Indus Valley. Greek forces started killing local army, civilians and animals to take the revenge. The site was filled with blood.

The bastion is notable for having been the site where two British emissaries were buried following their murder by Sikh rebels. The bastion was site of fierce fighting between Sikh forces and the 1st Bombay Fusiliers on the British side during the Siege of Multan in 1849, earning the structure its current name. Following the capture of the bastion, the graves of the two British emissaries were removed, and the bodies re-buried at the site of the Multan Fort.
