= Chah Nizam Walla =

Pakistani

Chah Nizam Walla چاه نِظام والا
- Neighbourhood
- Location in Pakistan
- Coordinates: 30°11′52″N 71°28′11″E
- Country: Pakistan
- Region: Punjab
- District: Multan District
- Time zone: UTC+5 (PST)

Chah Nizam Wala (Urdu: چاه نِظام والا), also known as Thaheem Lane, is a small suburb located in Bosan, Multan District, Pakistan. Its founder was Malik Nizam Khan Thaheem. It has an area of 360 kanals.

The suburb's main ethnic group is Thaheem (tribe) also known as Bani Tamim a Muslim group of Arabic origin which is believed to have come to the Punjab and Sindh in the 7th or 12th century.

Chah Nizam Wala is in the middle of two roads; its link road is connected to Nawabpur Road and Gillani Road, both of which are linked to Northern Bypass Multan and further to MDA Road and Bosan Road.

== Geo-graphics ==
It is located opposite to Royal Residency Multan and Fida Avenue Multan, off Nawab Pur Road Multan. It has two entry gates: one from Nawabpur Road Multan, and another from Ginlliani road from the canal side. It has a market with groceries and bakery items, known as Thaheem Market. Its location is prime to Northern Bypass Multan. Some of nearby urban suburbs include Gulgasht Colony Multan, Wapda Town Multan, Royal Orchard Multan Model Town Multan and DHA Multan.

== Roads and Infrastructure ==
This suburb is very well planned and developed. It has a metal road linking to two main roads i.e. Nawapur Road, Multan and Gillani Road known as Thaheem Lane. This area is equipped with Gas, telephone, fiber optics, and internet broadband with WiFi coverage of mobile phones data facilities. Northern Bypass Multan chowk is around 230 meters away from Thaheem Lane. Famous educational institutions in Multan city such as Nishat college of science Multan, Royal International School and Zakariya Public School are located within just 1 km from here. Bahauddin Zakariya University, FAST Multan Campus, Air University Multan and NUML are around 20 minutes drive from here. Moreover it is a secure gated community with security cameras installed across streets.

== Climate ==
Climate in summer is hot and humid. Spring season is very pleasant. Winter brings nice changes in the weather in this area. Monsoon is always full of rains. Overall the climate is very good to live. The suburb is surrounded by green trees all around which makes the weather even more attractive and pleasant.

== Population ==
Total population of this small suburb is around 5,000 people. Majority of them is youth. Half of the population consists of females. They are healthy and energetic in daily activities of the life. Youth population plays a key role in the political activities in the area here.
