= Rukn-e-Alam =

Punjabi Sufi saint

Shah Rukn-e-Alam شاہ رکن عالم
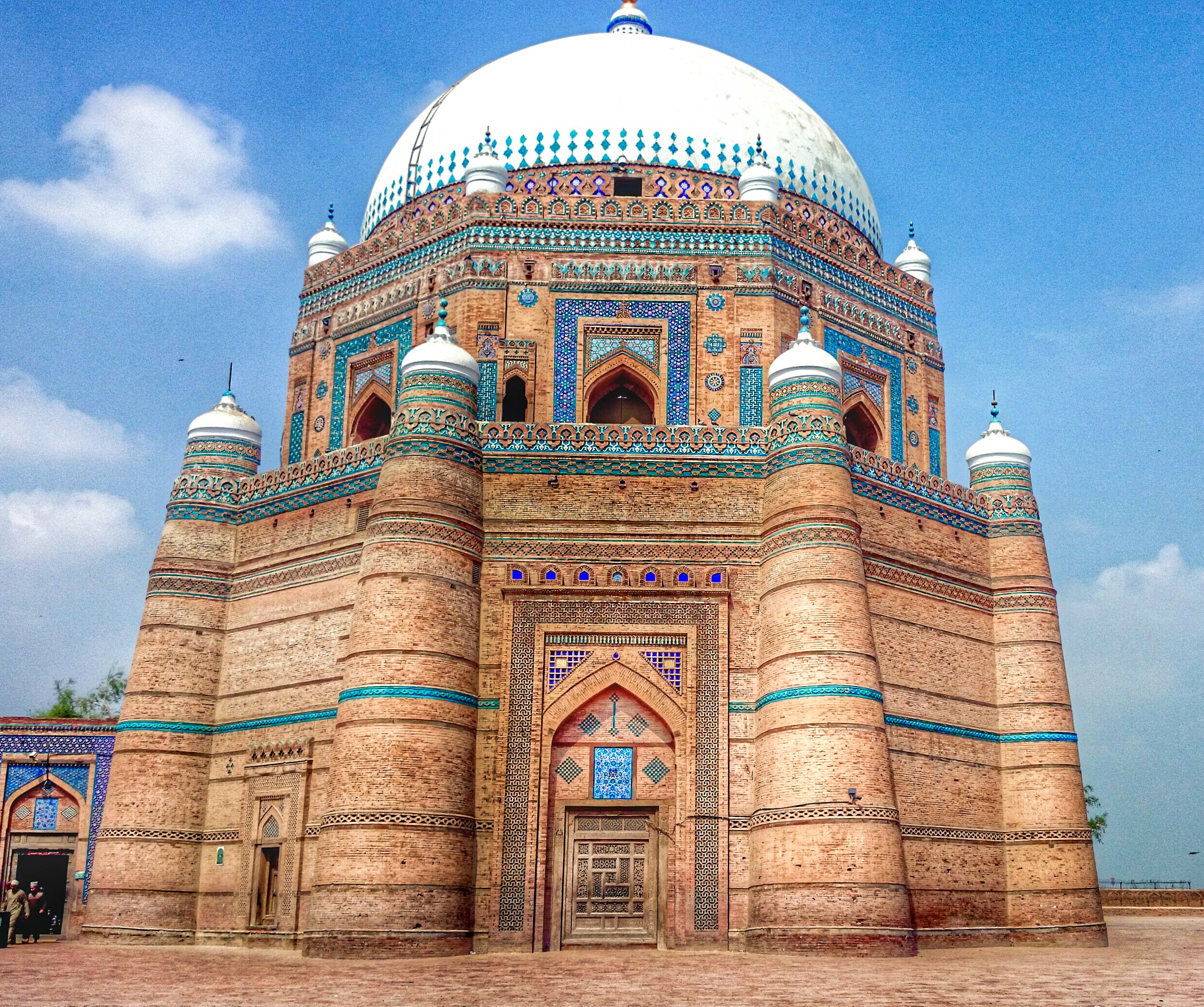
- The shrine of Rukn-e-Alam in Multan

Personal life
- Born: 26 November 1251 Multan, Punjab (present-day Punjab, Pakistan)
- Died: 3 January 1335 (aged 83) Multan, Punjab (present-day Punjab, Pakistan)

Religious life
- Religion: Sunni Islam

Senior posting
- Based in: Multan, Punjab
- Period in office: 13th and 14th century

Sheikh Rukn-ud-Din Abul Fateh (26 November 1251 – 3 January 1335), commonly known by the title Shah Rukn-e-Alam ("Pillar of the World"), was a Punjabi Sufi saint from Multan (present-day Punjab, Pakistan), who belonged to Suhrawardiyya Sufi order. His shrine in Multan is one of Punjab's most important places of historical and cultural value.

== Biography ==
Shah Rukn-e-Alam was the son of Pir Sadar-Al-Din Arif. His mother was Bibi Raasti who was the princess of Ferghana. He was born in Multan on 26 November 1251 and died 3 January 1335. He was the grandson and successor of Sheikh Baha-ud-din Zakariya. His grandfather Baha-ud-din Zakariya named him "Rukn-ud-Din". He was buried in the mausoleum of his grandfather, according to his own will, but later, his coffin was transferred to the present mausoleum.

== Mausoleum ==
The saint is still revered today and his tomb is the focus of the pilgrimage of over 100,000 pilgrims yearly from all over South Asia. Shah Mehmood Qureshi is the current Sajjada Nashin and custodian of the Mausoleum of Shah Rukn-e-Alam.

The tomb was built between 1320 and 1324 CE in the pre-Mughal architectural style. The tomb is believed to have been commissioned by Ghiyas-ud-Din Tughlaq (r. 1320–1325 CE) during his governorship of Depalpur (1320–1324 CE). It was later granted by his son, Muhammad bin Tughluq, to the descendants of Shah Rukn-e-Alam for his burial in 1330. In the 1970s, the mausoleum was thoroughly repaired and renovated by the Auqaf Department of the Government of Punjab. The entire glittering glazed interior is the result of new tiles and brickwork done by the Kashigars of Multan.

This tomb is on the tentative list as a UNESCO World Heritage Site.

== Memorandum ==
- Shah Rukan e Alam, named after the saint, is one of the autonomous towns of the city of Multan.
- A daily train service, Shah Rukn-e-Alam Express, between Multan and Karachi was named after him. It was suspended in February 2011 due to lack of locomotives.

== See also ==
- Baha-ud-din Zakariya
- Qari Muhammad Muslehuddin Siddiqui
- Suhrawardiyya
