= Shah Rukn-e-Alam Express =

Pakistani passenger train

Shah Rukn-e-Alam Express (Urdu: شاہ رکن عالم ایکسپریس) was a daily express train service of Pakistan Railways between Karachi and Multan in Pakistan. The train named was after Shah Rukn-e-Alam, a Sufi saint who lived in Multan in the 13th and 14th centuries.

It had Economy, AC (Air-Conditioned) Lower and AC Parlor class accommodation. It was suspended in February 2011 due to lack of locomotives.

== Route ==
Karachi to Multan via Hyderabad, Rohri, and Khanpur
