= Zakariya Town =

- Town
- District: Multan
- Province: Punjab
- Country: Pakistan
- Time zone: UTC+5 (PST)

Zakariya Town, named after Baha-ud-din Zakariya, is a residential area located on the famous Bosan Road in Multan, in the province of Punjab, Pakistan.

It is a locality of 45 streets. Each street contains approximately 30 houses. The town has poor infrastructure and sewerage problems.

It is one of the large housing schemes in the city of Multan.
