= Tomb of Khawaja Awais Kagha =

Tomb of Khawaja Awais Khagga
- مزار خواجہ اویس کھگا
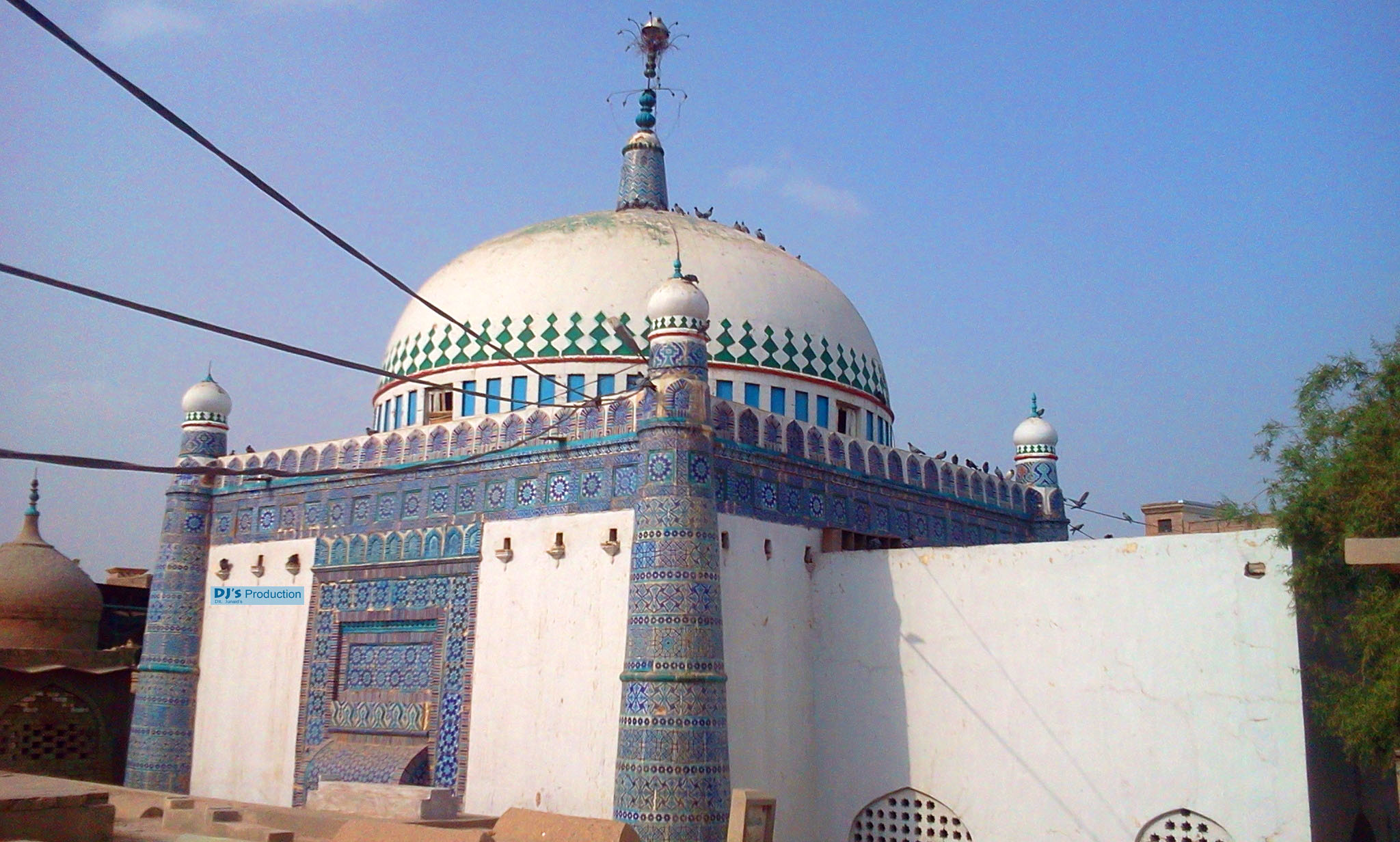
- Mausoleum in Dera Basti cemetery, Multan
- Location: Dera Basti cemetery, Multan, Punjab, Pakistan
- Coordinates: 30°10′46″N 71°27′37″E
- Type: Mausoleum
- Material: Brick faced with blue-and-white glazed tiles
- Dedicated to: Khawaja Awais Khagga

The Tomb of Khawaja Awais Khagga is a Sufi mausoleum located in Dera Basti cemetery, 1.6 kilometers southwest of Multan's historical center in Pakistan.

It was constructed around 1300 AD.

== Architecture ==
The tomb's architecture, echoing the 10th-century Ismail Samani Mausoleum in Bukhara, consists of a square base with corner turrets and a dome.

The tomb's exterior is adorned with blue and white glazed tiles, a distinctive Indus Valley feature originating from early Multan tombs. The building's main axis is atypical, facing south, while Islamic tradition usually favors east-facing entrances. This orientation is suggestive of Suhrawardi Sufi tombs in Multan, representing a departure from Islamic norms in favor of multifaith traditions. However, the tomb maintains orthodoxy through its southwest-aligned qibla, allowing prayers directed towards Mecca.
