= Gulgasht Colony =

Gulgasht Colony گلگشت کالونی
- Town
- Location in Pakistan
- Coordinates: 30°11′52″N 71°28′11″E
- Country: Pakistan
- Region: Punjab
- District: Multan District
- Time zone: UTC+5 (PST)

Gulgasht Colony (Urdu: گُلگشت كالونى), (Punjabi: گُلگشت كالونى) is an area of the city of Multan in the Punjab province of Pakistan. It is located at an altitude of 118 metres (387 ft), and is the location of a large police station.

The colony has a number of educational institutions. Government College, Multan (which also used to be known as Bosan Road College, later Govt. Emerson College, Multan and now Emerson University, Multan) is the oldest institute of learning in Multan. Various public and private schools and colleges provide education up to graduation level, including Punjab College for Women (PCW), University of Education Lahore (Multan Campus), British School and College Network, Govt. Science College, the Central College, Leadership College Network, Superior College, and Institute of Southern Punjab (ISP). The Board of Intermediate and Secondary Education (BISE) Multan is also situated in the area. Several private schools and colleges in the area follow foreign curricula like the British GCE Ordinary Level/Advanced level and the IB. The institutes like La Salle High School, Multan Public School and College, Girls Public School and College, Comprehensive Boys High School, FB Link Govt. Girls Comprehensive Secondary High School, Model High School For Boys, The Educators, Jinnah Highs, Bloomfield Hall, Nishat High School, Zikrya Public School, Zamir Public School and Beacon House attract students from all over Southern Punjab. Multan Public School and College with its 97-acre (39 ha) campus is one of the largest public schools in Pakistan.

Bahauddin Zakariya University, formerly known as Multan University, is the main source of learning higher education for this region.

Gulgasht Colony used to be a residential area, which quickly became commercial and a popular modern business centre of the city after old Chowk Bazar and Cantt shopping areas. This modern locality is a commercial hub with many restaurants, banks, hospitals, health clinics, trade agencies, fashion boutiques, shopping malls, super markets, department stores, beauty saloons and décor stores. The colony hosts a variety of restaurants and food chains like Pizza Hut, Hardee's, Glorea Jeans Coffee, Jhoke Restaurant, Shah Jahan Grill, Eat On, AFC, Lasani Foods, ABC Foods and Ghauri Foods.

Up to 1970 there was only one school i.e. Aligarh Model School. There was no clinics of any doctor. Only one medical store named Mannan Medical Store near Gool Bagh. There were only three barber shops: one in Gardaizi market, other in Mubeen market and yet another near Gool bagh. There were about eight shops encircling Jalal Masjid. Tongas was the only available means of travelling. There were two water tanks of water for horses at Jalal Masjid Chowk. Even ice was not available. However, in the evening two men used to come from city to sell ice on their carts. No book shop. It has become the educational headquarters of Multan.
