= Multan Fort =

Former fort in Punjab, Pakistan

The Multan Fort was a historic fort in the city of Multan, Punjab, Pakistan. It was built on a hillock separated from the city by the Ravi River. The fort was destroyed in 1849 by British forces during the Second Anglo-Sikh War.

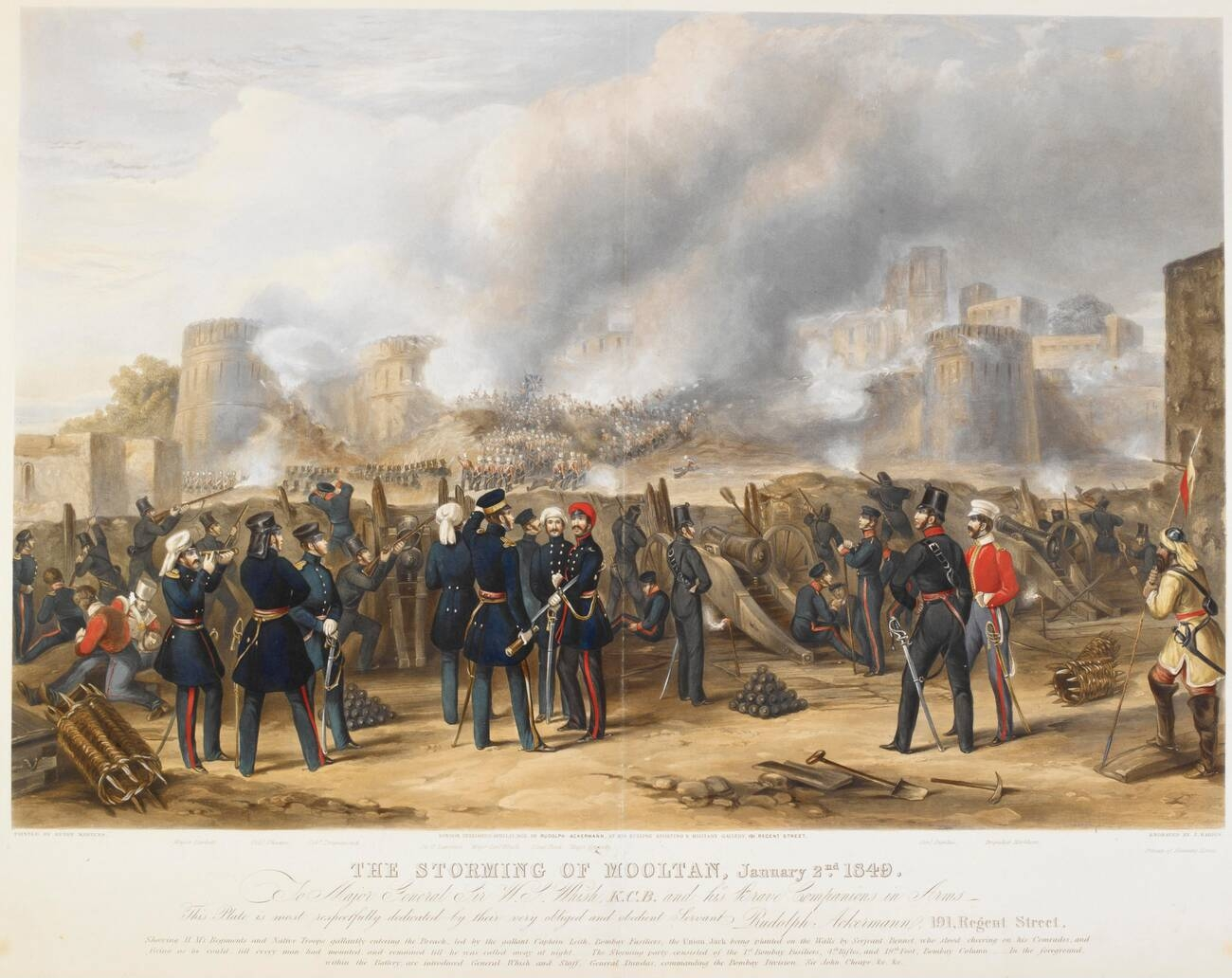
The storming of the Multan Fort by the British troops on 2 January 1849

The walls of the fort were built by the Mughal prince Murad Bakhsh in the 17th century. The fort was notable for both its effectiveness as a defence installation and for its architecture. The famed Multan Sun Temple was located within the fort premises. Contemporary reports put the walls of the fort at 12 to 21 metres (70 ft) high and 2 kilometers in circumference. The fort had 46 bastions which included two flanking towers at each of the four gates (the De, Sikki, Hareri and Khizri Gates). A ditch 7.6 metres (25 ft) deep and 12 metres (40 ft) wide and an 5.5-metre (18 ft) glacis protected the fort from intruders.

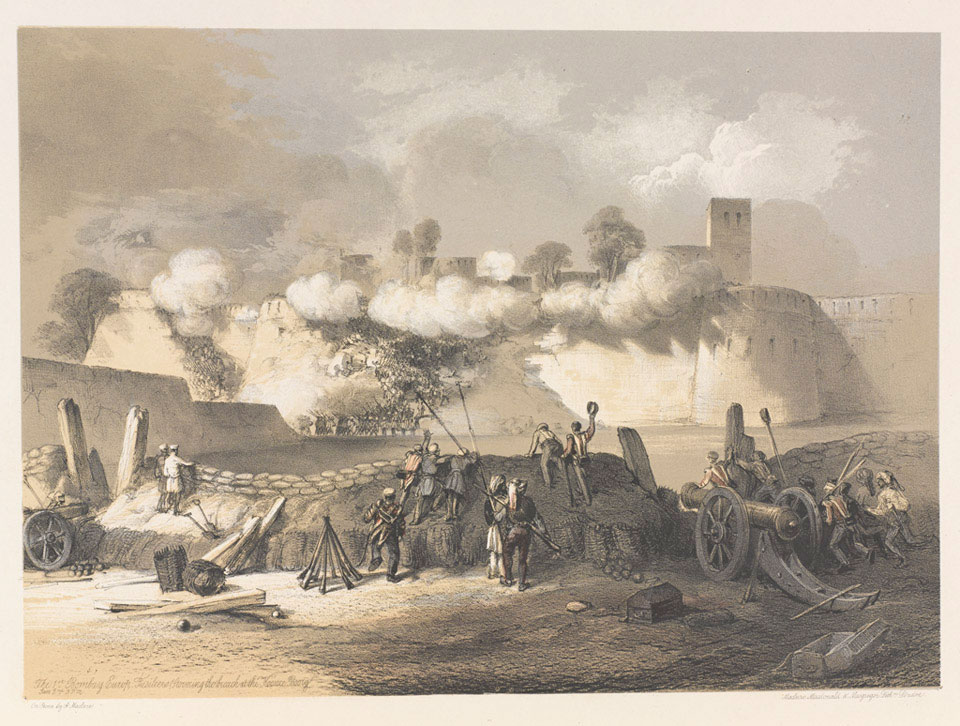
The 1st Bombay European Fusiliers storming the Breach at the Koonee Boorg, 2 January 1849

Within the fort stood a citadel flanked by 30 towers, enclosing a Hindu temple and a governor's palace. The citadel was severely damaged by the battering it got from the guns during the siege in 1818.

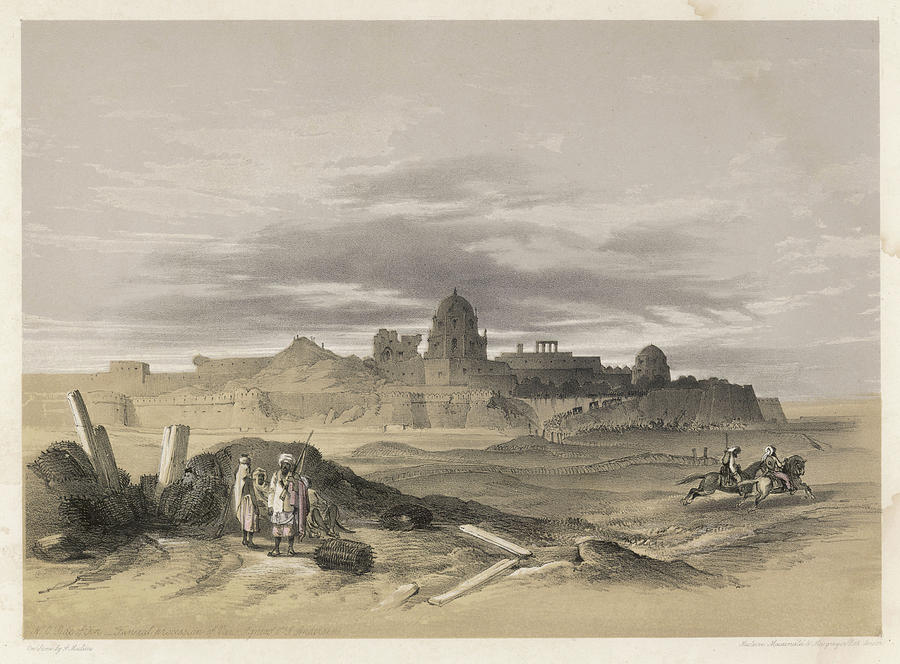
North East side of fort in 1848

== See also ==
- City Wall of Multan
- List of UNESCO World Heritage Sites in Pakistan
- List of forts in Pakistan
- List of museums in Pakistan
- Prahladpuri Temple
