= Pakistan Institute of Engineering & Technology =

Engineering School in Multan, Pakistan

Coordinates: 30.2168°N 71.5624°E

- Type: Private
- Established: 2013
- Affiliations: Bahauddin Zakariya University; Pakistan Engineering Council
- Location: Multan, Punjab, Pakistan
- Nickname: PIET
- Website: piet.edu.pk

The Pakistan Institute of Engineering & Technology (PIET) is a private institution located in Multan, Punjab, Pakistan. It was established in 2013. It offers undergraduate degree programs in engineering and computer science in affiliation with Bahauddin Zakariya University, Multan . It is also accredited by the Pakistan Engineering Council for engineering programs.

== Programs ==
The college offers following degree programs:

- BS Computer Science
- BE Civil Engineering
- BE Mechanical Engineering
- BE Electrical Engineering
