= Siege of Multan (1398) =

14th century battle in Multan, Pakistan

- Part of Timurid conquests and invasions and Timur's invasion of India
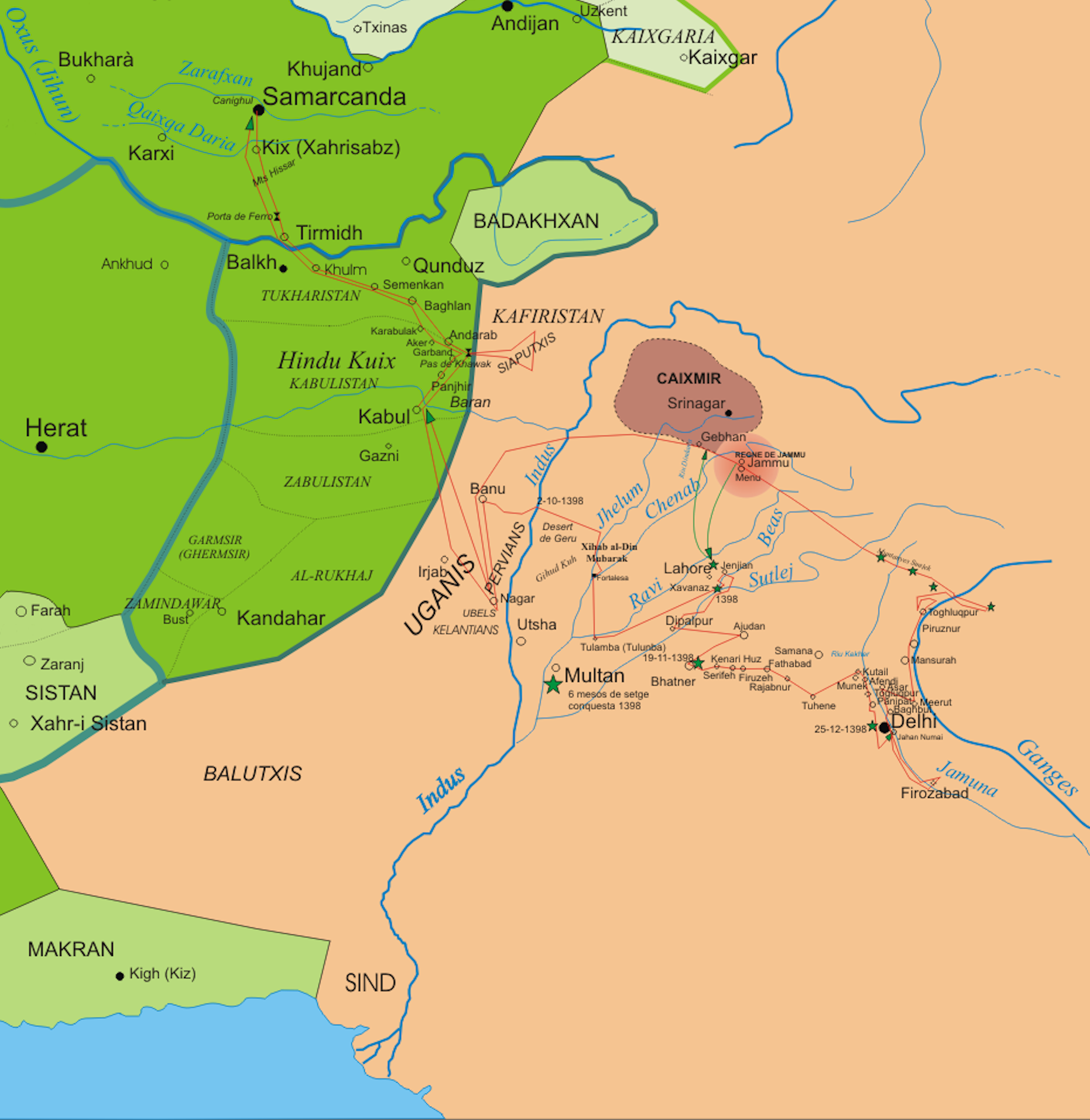
- Map showing Timur's invasion of India, 1397–1399
Date	1398
Location	Multan, present-day Pakistan
Result	Timurid victory

Belligerents
Timurid Empire	Delhi Sultanate

Commanders and leaders
Timur; Pir Muhammad	Governor of Multan †

Strength
Unknown	Unknown

Casualties and losses
Unknown	Heavy

The siege of Multan took place in 1398, it was led by Pir Muhammad and Timur. A six-month long siege resulted in a Timurid victory.

== Prelude ==
In 1398 Pir Muhammad and Timur began their Campaign in India. Due to the unrest and civil war in the Delhi Sultanate, his aim was to conquer the capital city of Delhi, along his way he would capture and sack other cities.

== The siege ==
During early 1398 Timur's grandson Pir Muhammad set off to India. One of the first cities they entered was Multan. Then Pir Muhammad laid siege to the city of Multan, the siege lasted six months and resulted in a Timurid victory, following a massacre and total destruction of the city.
