= City Wall of Multan =

Ancient wall in Pakistan

City Wall of Multan or Faseel e Multan (Urdu: فصیل ملتان) is an ancient wall encircling the old city of Multan. It was built and rebuilt many times as it was destroyed in battles. The original construction time is unknown but it was present during the Siege of Multan and damaged badly. Part of this wall near Haram Gate was destroyed and was used by British troops to enter into the city. The present wall was constructed in 1756 AD. These walls are now rehabilitated under The Multan Walled City Project.

== Gates ==
The gates of the wall in anti clockwise order, are Lohari Gate, Bohar Gate, Haram Gate, Pak Gate, Delhi Gate and Dolat Gate. Bloody Bastion is located on a turn between Pak Gate and Delhi Gate.

== Gallery ==
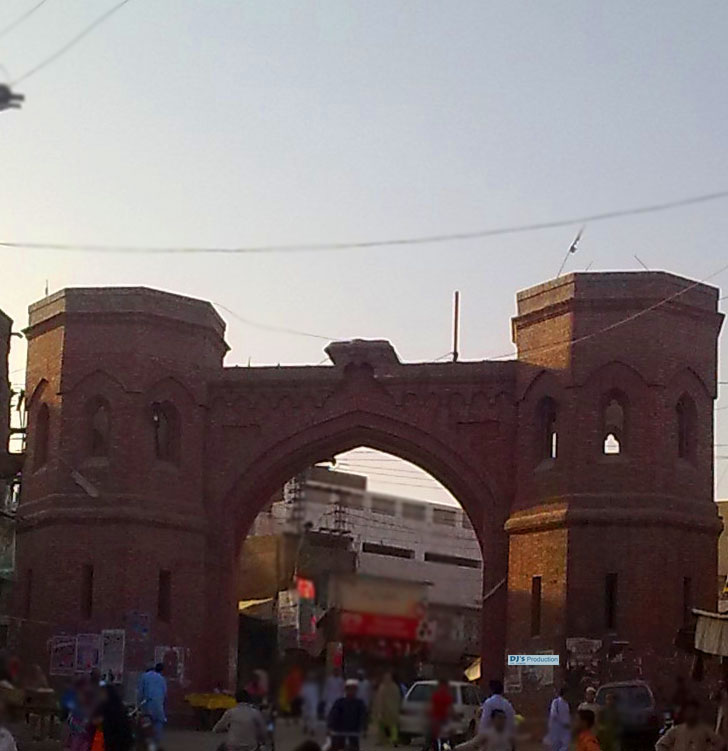
Delhi Gate

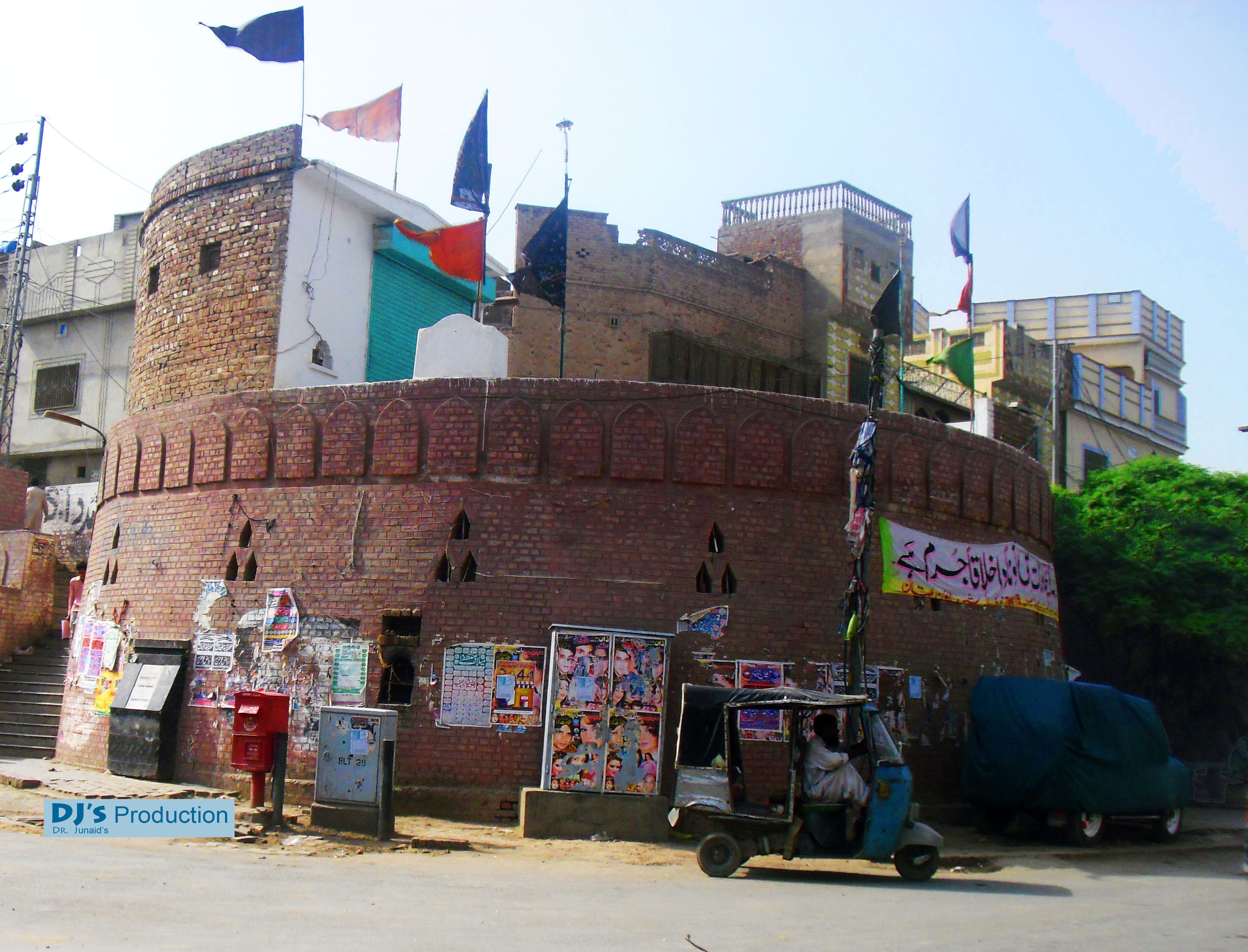
Bloody Bastion
