= Multan Public School =

School in Punjab, Pakistan

Multan Public School & College for Boys & Girls

Location
- Multan; Pakistan; 30°15′0″N 71°31′15″E

Information
- Type: Public
- Motto: Unity | Faith | Discipline
- Established: c. 1985
- Founder: Farid-Ud-Din
- Principal: Mohsin Mubarak (Principal MPS for Boys); Uzma Khan (Principal MPS for Girls)
- Sports: Gymnastics, riding, cricket, football, table tennis, badminton, basketball
- Affiliations: Multan Board (BISE) and University of Cambridge

Multan Public School and College is a boys' and girls' school in Multan, Multan Public School (boys) is a semi-government school in the province Punjab, Pakistan with separate campuses for boys and girls. The school pioneers in elementary, primary and secondary education coupled with a variety of extra curricular activities. The total area of the boys branch is 100 acres (40 ha), and the girls branch is 40 acres (16 ha).

== History ==
Multan Public School & College (MPS&C) is one of the biggest schools of the Southern Punjab. The credit of establishing the school goes to the then Commissioner of Multan Division, Farid ud Din Ahmed. In 1985, school was started in a rented building in Pir Khursheed Colony whilst its first building became functional in 1987. The second and third blocks were ready by 1988.

It has many grounds for playing different games like a cricket oval, tennis and squash courts, hockey ground and football ground.

== Transport ==
15 Buses, 5 small vehicles for pick and drop service for students and employees.
