= Bosan =

Neighbourhood residential locality in Multan, Punjab, Pakistan

- Location within Pakistan
- Coordinates: 30.22°N 71.32°E
- Country: Pakistan
- Province: Punjab
- District: Multan
- Time zone: UTC+5 (PST)

Bosan is a town in Multan District, Pakistan.

It is an agricultural area known for mango and orange production, and is one of the largest mango producers in Pakistan. Bosan Town is also famous for its rich livestock. Most of the people here have adopted livestock as their livelihood. The majority of the people here have work related to agriculture.

The leading educational institution in South Punjab Bahauddin Zakariya University is located in Bosan Town. There are many secondary and higher secondary schools as well as a few colleges of intermediate and undergraduate studies. Bosan Town is well facilitated with electricity, gas and telecommunications networks. Fiber optic cables are spread in almost all the villages and small areas of the town. Road infrastructure is quite good and new roads are still being built.

The former Prime Minister of Pakistan Syed Yousaf Raza Gillani had been elected from this town more than 3 times.

== Important places ==
- Gulgasht Colony, Multan
- Bahauddin Zakariya University
- Government College of Science, Multan
- Government College, Bosan Road Multan
- Aligarh College, Gulgasht Colony, Multan
- Gol Bagh, Multan
- Bosan Road, Multan
- Nawabpur Road, Multan

== Climate ==
Bosan is very hot in the summer, but winters are mild, permitting the area's fruit production.
