= Shah Rukn-e-Alam Colony =

Shah Rukn-e-Alam Colony شاہ رکن عالم کالونی
- Neighbourhood
- Location in Punjab Location in Pakistan
- Coordinates: 30.164627°N 71.441451°E
- Country: Pakistan
- Province: Punjab
- Division: Multan
- District: Multan
- Established: 1984
- Time zone: UTC+5 (PST)
- Website: www.mda.gop.pk/project_menu.php

Shah Rukn-e-Alam Colony is one of the autonomous towns of the city of Multan in the Punjab province of Pakistan. It was established in 1984 by Multan Development Authority.

== Location ==
Shah Rukn-e-Alam Colony was developed in Multan, and is connected to Masoom Shah Road and Bypass Road. It is a self-income scheme of Multan Development Authority.

== Phases ==
Sr.No.	Name	Area (in acres)	No. of Plots
1	Shah Rukn-e- Alam (Phase I)	170	2187
2	Shah Rukn-e- Alam (Phase II)	440	5135
3	Shah Rukn-e- Alam (Phase II)	37	1176
Total		647	8498

All the 8,498 residential plots have been disposed off. Development work including water supply, sewerage and roads has been completed.
