= Multan =

City in Punjab, Pakistan

Multan ملتان
- Metropolis
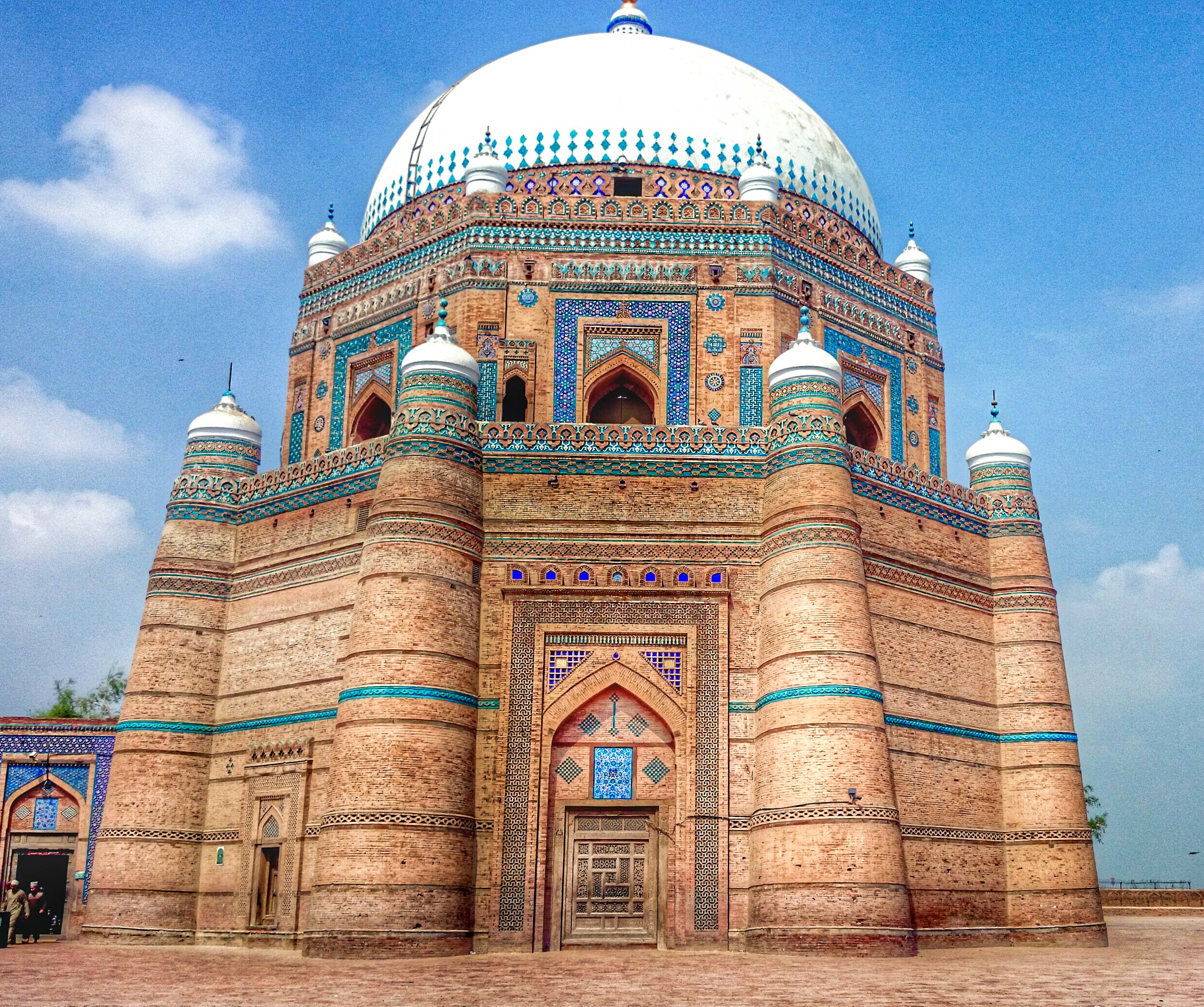
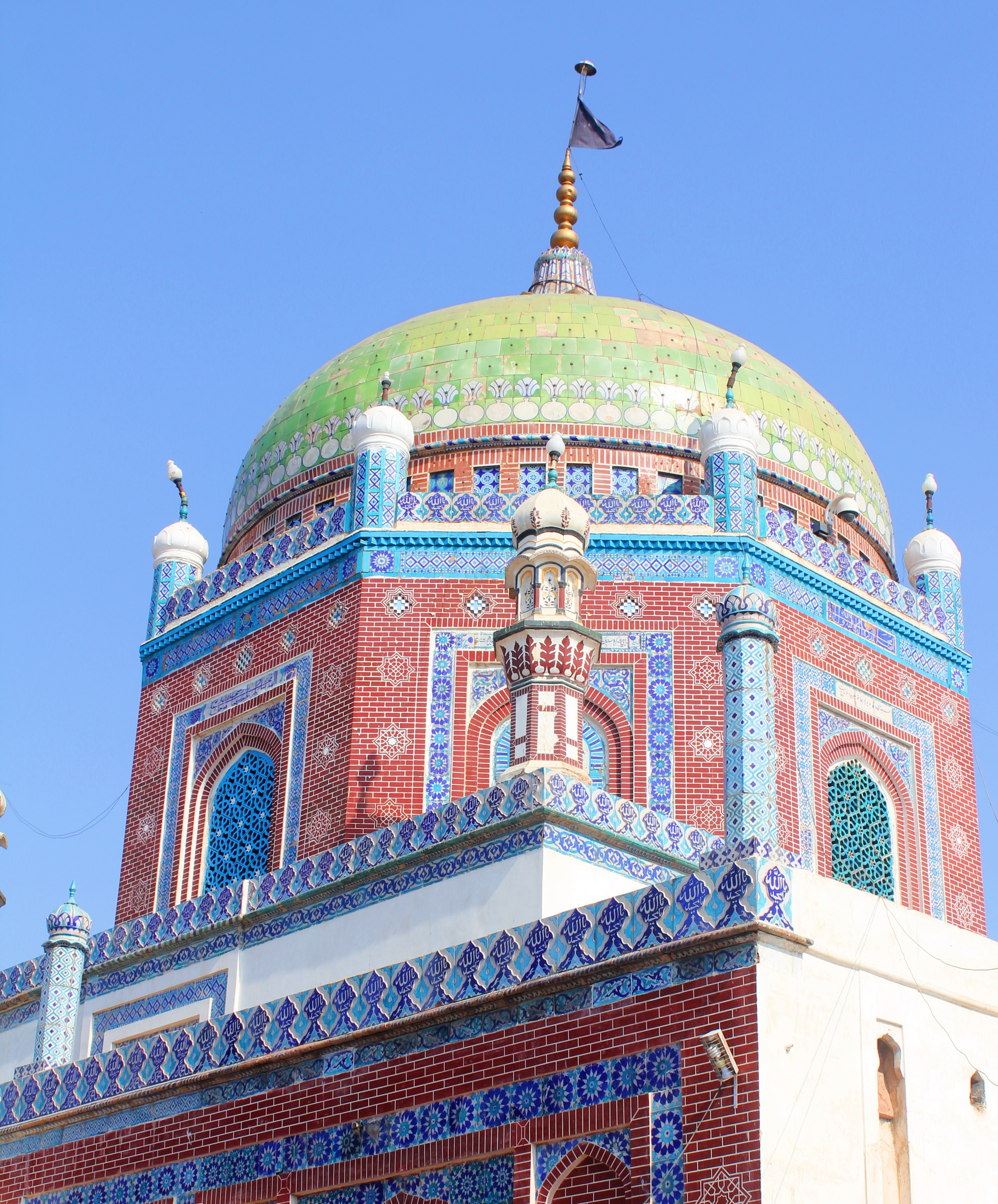
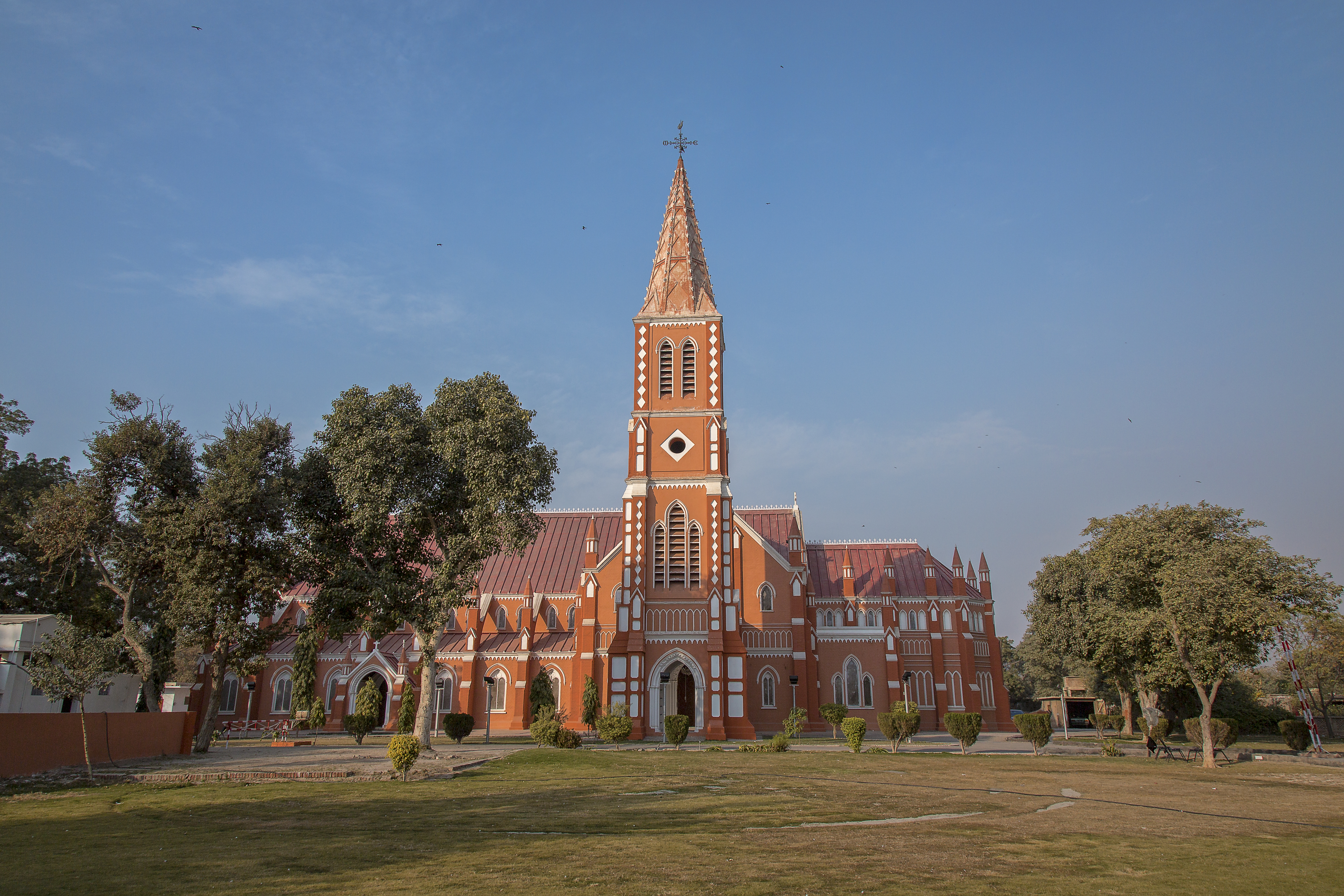
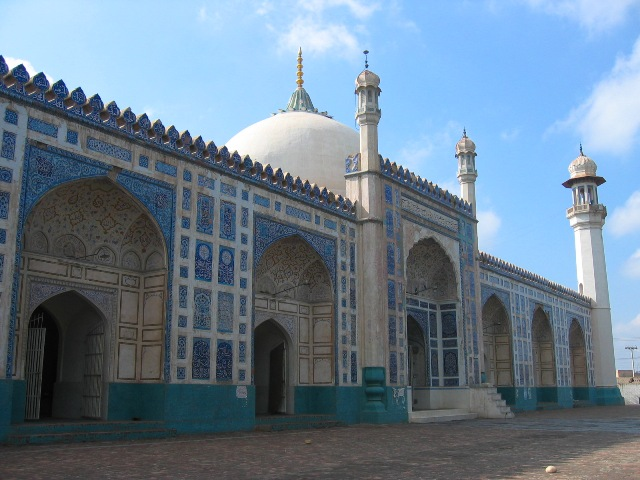
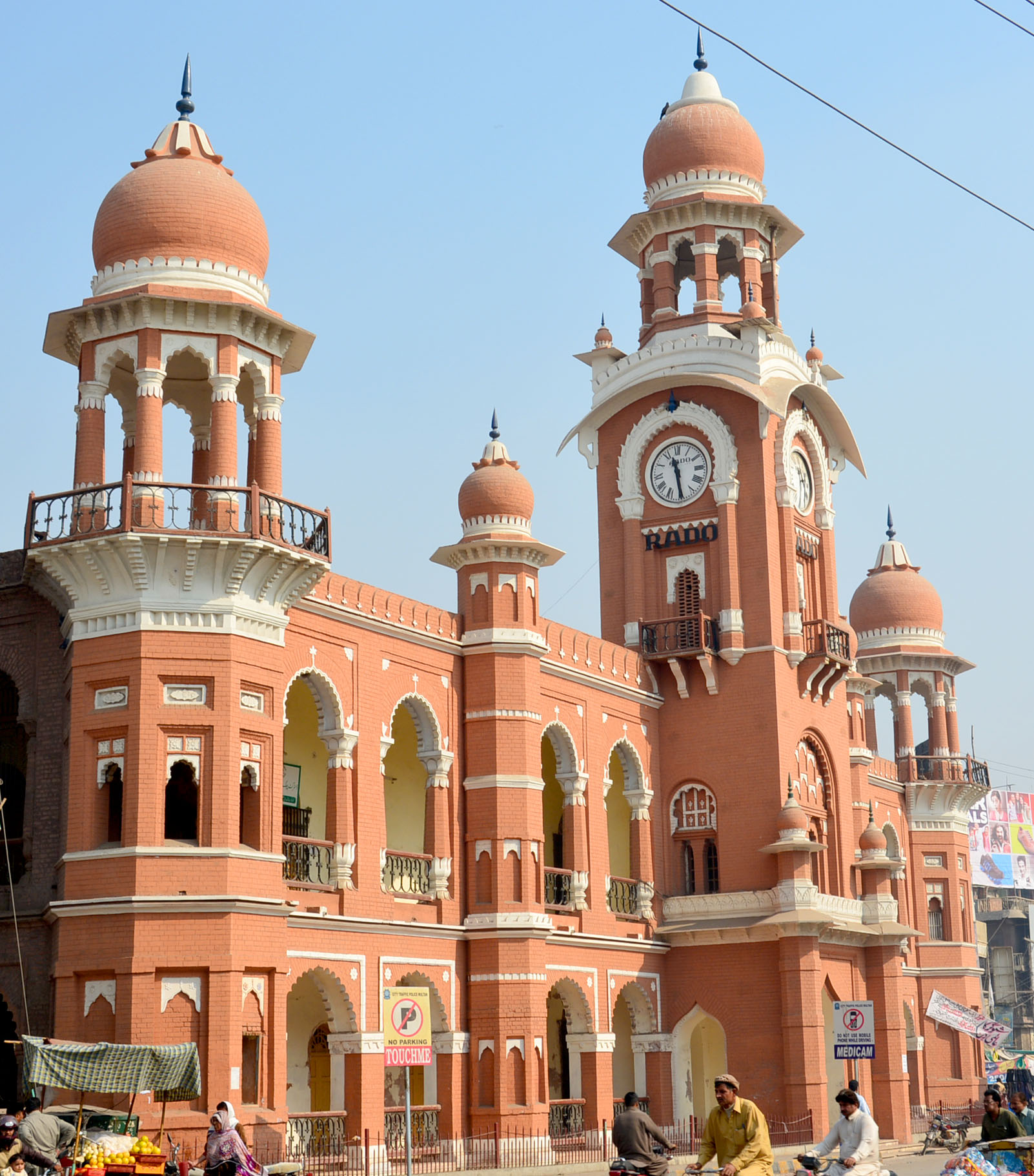
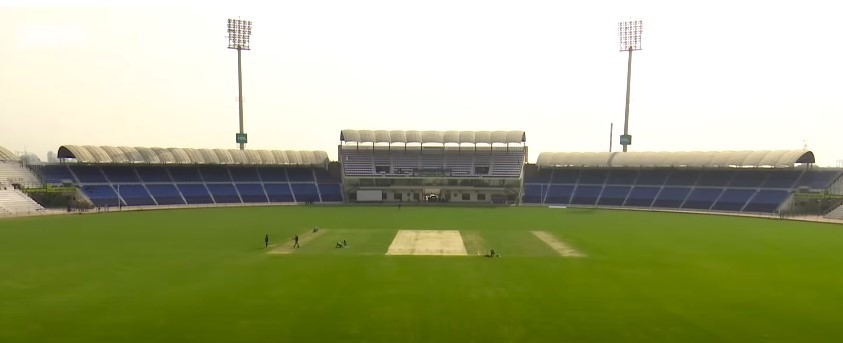
- Clockwise from top: The tomb of Shah Rukn-e-Alam, Saint Mary's Cathedral, Clock Tower, Multan Cricket Stadium, Shahi Eid Gah Mosque, Tomb of Shamsuddin Multani

- Location in Punjab Location in Pakistan
- Coordinates: 30°11′52″N 71°28′11″E
- Country: Pakistan
- Province: Punjab
- Division: Multan
- District: Multan
- Autonomous towns: 6
- Union council: 4
- Settled: 3000 BC

Government
  - Type: Metropolitan Corporation
  - Mayor: Sheikh Abdul Wahab
  - Deputy Mayor: None (Vacant)

Area
  - Metro: 560 km^{2} (220 sq mi)

Population (2023)
  - City: 2,215,381 (Note: This figure includes population of Multan City Tehsil and Multan Cantonment.)
  - Rank: 6th in Pakistan; 5th in Punjab
  - Density: 7,000/km^{2} (18,000/sq mi)
- Postal code: 60xxx
- Area code: 061
- Website: multan.punjab.gov.pk

Multan (Note: ملتان; local pronunciation: [mɵlˈtäːnᵊ]) is a city in the Punjab province of Pakistan. Located along the eastern bank of the Chenab River, it is the sixth-largest city in the country and serves as the administrative headquarters of its eponymous division and district. A major cultural, religious and economic centre of the Punjab region, Multan is one of the oldest continuously inhabited cities in Asia, with a history stretching deep into antiquity.

The ancient town was besieged by Alexander the Great during the Mallian campaign in 326 BCE. Later it was conquered by the Umayyad military commander Muhammad bin Qasim in 712 CE after the conquest of Sindh. In the 9th century, it became capital of the Emirate of Multan. The region came under the rule of Ghaznavid and the Delhi sultanates in the medieval period. In 1445, it became capital of Langah Sultanate. Multan Subah, formed after reforms of Akbar in 1580, was one of the largest provinces of the Mughal Empire. The Sikh Empire ruled over Multan from 1818 till 1849 when it was captured by the British after a lengthy siege.

The city was among the most important trading centres of South Asia with strong ties to Iran, Central Asia and the rest of Persianate and Muslim world. A great centre of knowledge and learning during the medieval period, Multan attracted a multitude of Sufi mystics in the 11th and 12th centuries, earning the city the sobriquet "City of Saints." Multan, along with the nearby city of Uch, is known for its large number of Sufi shrines dating from that era.

== Etymology ==
The origin of Multan's name is unclear. An ancient known name of the city was Malli-istan; Malli was the name of a tribe that inhabited the region and city. The city name may have been derived from the deity of the ancient Multan Sun Temple. Some have suggested the name derives from the Old Persian word mulastāna, 'frontier land', while others have ascribed its origin to the Sanskrit word mūlasthāna.

== History ==
Historical affiliations

Indus Valley Civilisation (3300 – 1300 BCE)

- Early Harappan (3300 – 2600 BCE)
- Mature Harappan (2600 – 1900 BCE)
- Late Harappan (1900 – 1300 BCE)

Vedic Period (1500 – 500 BCE)

- Anu (1500 – 1200 BCE)
- Trigarta (1200 – 500 BCE)

Achaemenid Empire (513 – 331 BCE)
Mallian people (331 – 325 BCE)
Macedonian Empire (325 – 317 BCE)
Maurya Empire (317 – 185 BCE)
Indo-Greek Kingdom (185 – 85 BCE)
Indo-Scythian Kingdom (85 BCE – 25 CE)
Indo-Parthian Kingdom (25 – 75 CE)
Kushan Empire (75 – 375 CE)

- Sassanid Empire (325 – 390 CE)
- Gupta Empire (350 – 390 CE)

Kidarite Kingdom (390 – 460)
Alchon Kingdom (460 – 550 CE)
Rai Kingdom (550 – 632)
Chach Kingdom (632 – 714)
Umayyad Caliphate (714 – 750)
Abbasid Caliphate (750 – 861)
Multan Emirate (861 – 1010)
Ghaznavid Empire (1010 – 1030)
Multan Emirate (1030 – 1178)
Ghurid Empire (1178 – 1206)
Multan State (1206 – 1228)
Delhi Sultanate (1228 – 1245)
Mongol Empire (1245 – 1246)
Delhi Sultanate (1246 – 1249)
Qarlughid Kingdom (1249 – 1249)
Delhi Sultanate (1249 – 1257)
Mongol Empire (1257 – 1257)
Delhi Sultanate (1257 – 1398)
Timurid Empire (1398 – 1414)
Delhi Sultanate (1414 – 1445)
Langah Sultanate (1445 – 1528)
Arghun Sultanate (1528 – 1528)
Mughal Empire (1528 – 1541)
Sur Empire (1541 – 1543)
Mirani Principality (1543 – 1543)
Sur Empire (1543 – 1555)
Mughal Empire (1555 – 1739)
Afsharid Empire (1739 – 1739)
Mughal Empire (1739 – 1752)
Durrani Empire (1752 – 1758)
Adina Beg Khan (1758 – 1758)
Maratha Empire (1758 – 1760)
Durrani Empire (1760 – 1772)
Bhangi Misl (1772 – 1780)
Durrani Empire (1780 – 1818)
Sikh Empire (1818 – 1849)
East India Company (1849 – 1858)
British Raj (1858 – 1947)
Pakistan (1947 – present)

=== Origin ===
The region around Multan is home to several archaeological sites dating to the early Harappan period of the Indus Valley Civilisation between 3000 BCE and 2800 BCE. According to the Hindu religious texts, Multan was founded by the sage Kashyapa. These texts also assert that Multan was the capital of the Trigarta Kingdom during the Kurukshetra War that is central to the Sanskrit epic poem, the Mahabharata. The neighbourhood was visited by the Greek admiral Skylax who sailed down the Indus River in 515 BCE; his account is preserved in the Histories of the Greek historian Herodotus which was written down in 400 BCE.

=== Invasion of Alexander the Great ===
Multan is believed to have been the Malli capital that was conquered by Alexander the Great in 326 BCE as part of the Mallian campaign. The Mallian people, together with the nearby tribes, gathered an army of 90,000 personnel to fight against an army of 50,000 Greeks. This was perhaps the largest army faced by Greeks in the entire region. During the siege of the city's citadel, Alexander reputedly leaped into the inner area of the citadel, where he faced the Mallian leader. Alexander was wounded by an arrow that had penetrated his lung, leaving him severely injured. During Alexander's era, Multan was located on an island in the Ravi River, which has since shifted course numerous times throughout the centuries.

In the mid-5th century CE, the city was attacked by Alchon Huns, a group of Hephthalite nomads led by Toramana. After a fierce fight they conquered Multan, but did not stay long.

By the mid-7th century CE, Multan was conquered by Chach of Alor of the Buddhist Rai dynasty. Chach appointed a thakur to govern from Multan, and used his army to settle boundary disputes with Kashmir.

=== Umayyad conquest ===
Multan was first invaded by a Muslim army after the reign of the caliph Ali, in 664 CE, when Mohalib, an Arab general, occupied the area. The expedition, however, seems to have been directed towards exploration of the country as no attempt was apparently made to retain the conquest. After conquering Sindh, Muhammad ibn Qasim in 712 CE captured Multan following a two-month siege. Following ibn Qasim's conquest, the city's subjects remained mostly non-Muslim for the next few decades under the Umayyad Caliphate.

=== Emirate of Multan ===
==== Abbasid Emirate ====
By the mid-800s, the Banu Munabbih (855–959) also known as the Banu Sama, who claimed descent from the Islamic prophet Muhammad's Quraysh tribe came to rule Multan, and established the Emirate of Banu Munabbih, which ruled for a century. The city thus became capital of the Emirate of Multan in 855. Al-Masudi of Baghdad who visited Indus Valley in 915 mentioned in his The Meadows of Gold that it was one of the strongest frontier places of Muslims, and in its neighbourhood there were a hundred and twenty thousand towns and villages.

During this era, the Multan Sun Temple was noted by the 10th century Arab geographer al-Muqaddasi to have been located in a most populous part of the city. The Hindu temple was noted to have accrued the Muslim rulers large tax revenues, by some accounts up to 30% of the state's revenues. During this time, the city's Arabic nickname was Faraj Bayt al-Dhahab, ("Frontier House of Gold"), reflecting the importance of the temple to the city's economy.

The Arab historian al-Ma'sudi noted Multan as the city where Central Asian caravans from Islamic Khorasan would assemble. The 10th century Persian geographer Estakhri visited the area. At the time Mansura (the capital of Sindh) along with Multan were the only two major Arab principalities in South Asia. Arabic was spoken in both cities, though the inhabitants of Multan were reported by Estakhri to also have been speakers of Persian, reflecting the importance of trade with Khorasan. Polyglossia rendered Multani merchants culturally well-suited for trade with the Islamic world.

The 10th century Hudud al-'Alam notes that Multan's rulers were also in control of Lahore, though that city was then lost to the Hindu Shahis. During the 10th century, Multan's rulers resided at a camp outside of the city named Jandrawār, and would enter Multan once a week on the back of an elephant for Friday prayers.

==== Isma'ili Emirate ====
By the mid 10th century, Multan had come under the influence of the Qarmatian Isma'ilis. The Qarmatians had been expelled from Egypt and Iraq following their defeat at the hands of the Abbasids there. Qarmatian zealots had famously sacked Mecca, and outraged the Muslim world with their theft and ransom of the Kaaba's Black Stone, and desecration of the Zamzam Well with corpses during the Hajj season of 930 CE.

The governor of Jhang, Umar bin Hafas, was a clandestine supporter of the Fatimid movement and the Batiniya influence spread in southern Punjab. Then, the Qarmatians who had established contacts with the Fatimids in Egypt set up an independent dynasty in Multan and ruled the surrounding areas.

They wrested control of the city from the pro-Abbasid Emirate of Banu Munabbih, and established their own rule, while pledging allegiance to the Isma'ili Fatimid dynasty based in Cairo. During this period, Uch and Multan remained a central pilgrimage site for Vaishnavite and Surya devotees, and their admixture with Isma'īlīsm created the Satpanth tradition. Hence, the beginning of the eleventh century witnessed a sacral and political diversity in Uch that was both unique and precarious. The Qarmatian Isma'ilis opposed Hindu pilgrims worshipping the sun, and destroyed the Sun Temple and smashed its revered Aditya idol in the late 10th century. The Qarmatians built an Ismaili congregational mosque above the ruins to replace the city's Sunni congregational mosque that had been established by the city's early rulers.

=== High medieval period ===
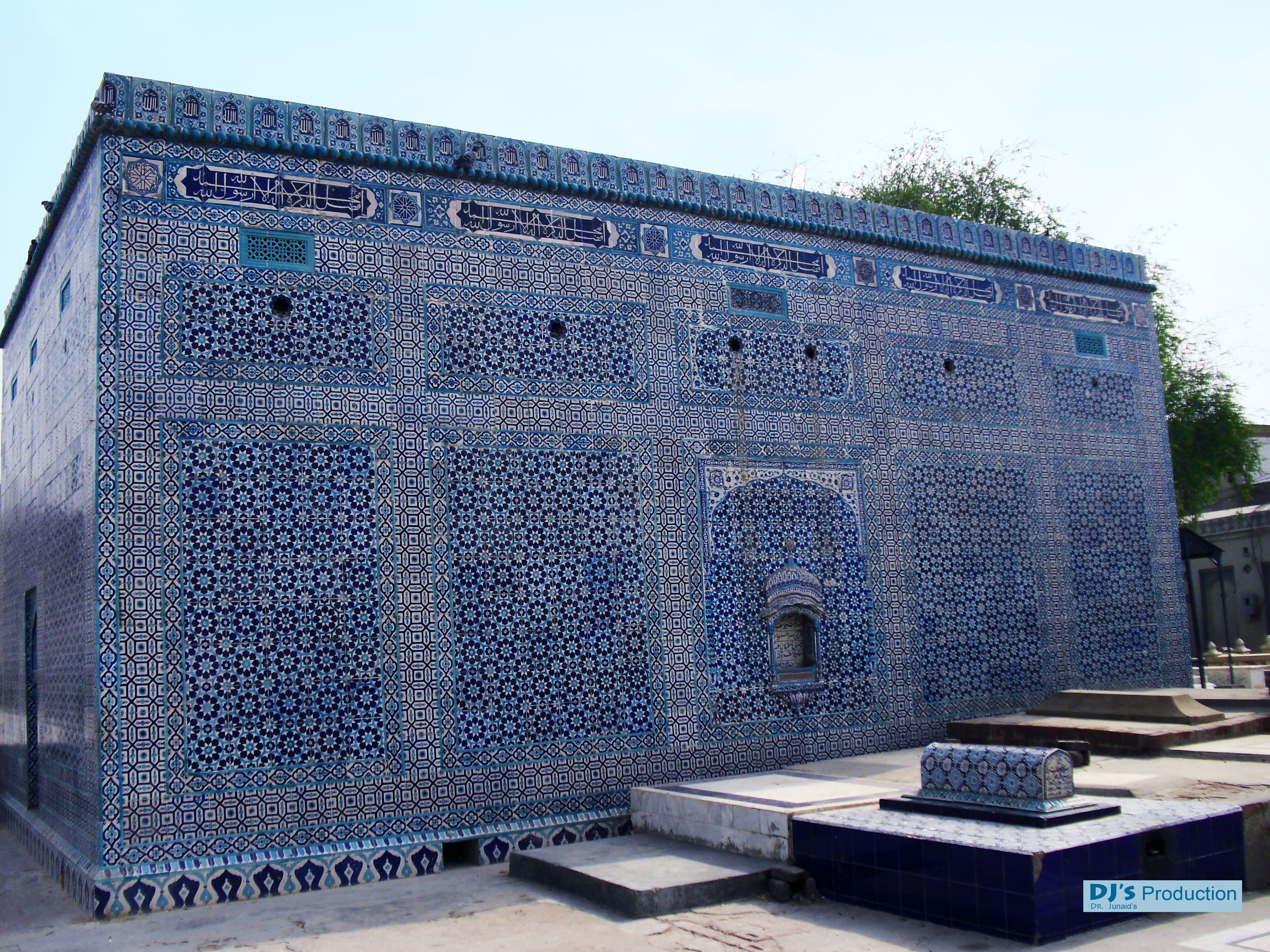
Multan is famous for its large number of Sufi shrines, including the unique rectangular tomb of Shah Gardez that dates from the 1150s and is covered in blue enameled tiles typical of Multan.

==== Ghaznavid dynasty ====
In the 10th century, the Muslim emirs of Multan assisted Jayapala, the Hindu Shahi ruler, because of the slave incursions into their territories by the rulers of Ghazni. However, Jayapala was unable to conquer Ghazni, and the alliance he had formed quickly fell apart.

Mahmud of Ghazni led an expedition in 1005 against Multan's Qarmatian ruler Fateh Daud. The city surrendered, and Fateh Daud was permitted to retain control over the city with the condition that he adhere to Sunnism. In 1007, Mahmud led another expedition to Multan against his former minister and Hindu convert, Niwasa Khan, who had renounced Islam and attempted to establish control of the region in collusion with Abul Fateh Daud of Multan.

In 1010, Mahmud led his third and punitive expedition against Daud to depose and imprison him, and suppressed Isma'ilism in favour of the Sunni creed. He destroyed the Isma'ili congregational mosque that had been built above the ruins of the Multan Sun Temple, and restored the city's old Sunni congregational mosque, built by Muhammad bin Qasim.

The 11th century scholar Abu Mansur al-Baghdadi reported that the Isma'ili community was still living in the city. Following the Ghaznavid invasion of Multan, the local Isma'ili community split, with one faction aligning themselves with the Druze religion, which today survives in Lebanon, Syria, and the Golan Heights. Following Mahmud's death in 1030, Multan regained its independence from the Ghaznavid Empire and came under the sway of Isma'ili rule once again. Shah Gardez who came to Multan in 1088, is said to have contributed in the restoration of the city.

By the early 1100s, Multan was described by the Arab geographer Muhammad al-Idrisi as being a "large city" commanded by a citadel that was surrounded by a moat. In the early 12th century, Multani poet Abdul Rahman penned the Sandeśarāsaka, the only known Muslim work in the medieval Apabhraṃśa language.

==== Ghurid dynasty ====
In 1175, Muhammad Ghori conquered Isma'ili-ruled Multan, after having invaded the region via the Gomal Pass from Afghanistan into Punjab, and used the city as a springboard for his unsuccessful campaign into Gujarat in 1178. Multan was then annexed to the Ghurid Sultanate, and became an administrative province of the Mamluk dynasty—the first dynasty based in Delhi.

==== Mamluk dynasty ====
Following the death of the first Mamluk sultan, Qutb al-Din Aibak in 1210, Multan came under the rule of Nasiruddin Qabacha, who in 1222, successfully repulsed an attempted invasion by Sultan Jalal al-Din Mangburni of the Khwarazmian Empire. Uch and Sindh were also in control of Qabacha.

Qabacha also captured Lahore many times and ruled all these regions. He repulsed a siege imposed on Multan city by Mongol forces who attempted to conquer the city. He gathered a large army from Uch, Multan and Bukkhar (Sukkur) and Mongols were repulsed.

Following Qabacha's death that same year, the Turkic king Iltutmish, the third sultan of the Mamluk dynasty, captured and then annexed Multan in an expedition. The Punjabi poet Baba Farid was born in the village of Khatwal near Multan in the 1200s.

Qarlughids attempted to invade Multan in 1236, while the Mongols tried to capture the city in 1241 after capturing Lahore—though they were repulsed. The Mongols under Sali Noyan then successfully held the city to ransom in 1245–6, before being recaptured by Sultan Balban, the ninth Mamluk sultan. Multan then fell to the Qarlughids in 1249, but was captured by Sher Khan that same year. Multan was then conquered by Izz al-Din Balban Kashlu Khan in 1254, before he rebelled against Sultan Balban in 1257 and fled to Iraq where he joined Mongol forces and captured Multan again, and dismantled its city walls. The Mongols again attempted an invasion in 1279, but were dealt a decisive defeat.

==== Khalji dynasty ====
The Delhi Sultan Alauddin Khalji dispatched his brother Ulugh Khan in 1296 to conquer Multan region which was governed by surviving family members of his predecessor, Sultan Jalal-ud-din Khalji.

After usurping the throne of Delhi, Alauddin decided to eliminate the surviving family members of Jalaluddin, who were present in Multan. In November 1296, he sent a 30,000–40,000 strong army led by Ulugh Khan and Zafar Khan to Multan who successfully captured the city after two months of siege.

Amir Khusrau, the famous Indo-Persian Sufi singer, musician, poet and scholar visited Multan on the invitation of Khan Muhammad. Multan at the time was the gateway to India and was a center of knowledge and learning. Caravans of scholars, tradesmen and emissaries transited through Multan from Baghdad, Arabia and Persia on their way to Delhi. Khusrau wrote that: "I tied the belt of service on my waist and put on the cap of companionship for another five years. I imparted lustre to the water of Multan from the ocean of my wits and pleasantries".

==== Tughluq dynasty ====
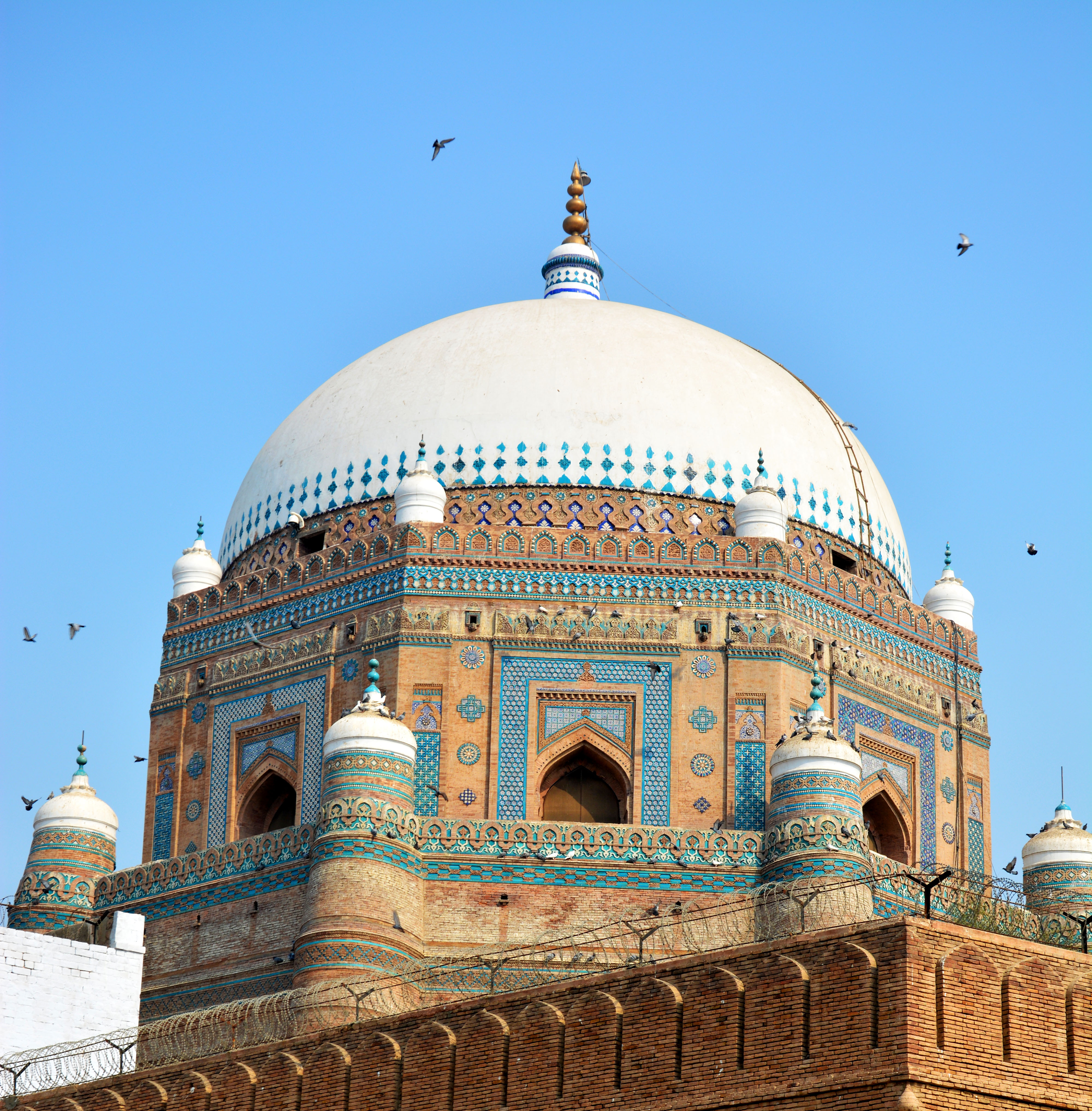
Multan's Tomb of Shah Rukn-e-Alam is considered to be the earliest Tughluq era monument.

In the 1320s Multan was conquered by Ghiyath al-Din Tughluq, he was made the governor of Multan and southern Punjab, Sindh and Depalpur. He was the founder of the Tughluq dynasty, the third dynasty of the Delhi Sultanate. Earlier he spent his time in Multan and fought 28 battles against Mongols from there and saved the regions from advances of Mongols. He wrote in the jamia Masjid of Multan that he had fought 28 battles against Mongols and had survived, people gave him the title Ghazi ul-Mulk.

Ghiyath al-Din's son Muhammad bin Tughlaq was born in Multan. After Ghiyath's death he became the Sultan and ascended the throne in Delhi. The countryside around Multan was recorded to have been devastated by excessively high taxes imposed during the reign of Ghiyath's son, Muhammad bin Tughlaq. In 1328, the Governor of Multan, Kishlu Khan, rose in rebellion against Muhammad bin Tughluq, but was quickly defeated.

The Tomb of Shah Rukn-e-Alam was completed during the Tughluq era, and is considered to be the first Tughluq monument. The shrine is believed to have been originally built to be the tomb of Ghiyath al-Din, but was later donated to the descendants of Rukn-e-Alam after Ghiyath became emperor of Delhi.

The famed Arab explorer Ibn Battuta visited Multan in the 1300s during the reign of Muhammad bin Tughluq, and noted that Multan was a trading centre for horses imported from as far away as the Russian Steppe. Multan had also been noted to be a centre for slave-trade, though slavery was banned in the late 1300s by Muhammad bin Tughluq's son, Firuz Shah Tughlaq.

==== Invasion of Emir Timur ====
In 1397, Multan was besieged by Timur's grandson Pir Muhammad. Pir Muhammad's forces captured the city in 1398 following the conclusion of the half a year long siege. Khizr Khan, the governor of Multan, allied with Amir Timur. Timur captured Lahore and gave its control to Khizr khan as reward for his support. Also in 1398, the elder Timur and Multan's governor Khizr Khan together accomplished the sack of Delhi. The sack of Delhi lead to major disruptions of the Sultanate's central governing structure. Khizr Khan ruled the subcontinent on the name of Timur. In 1414, Khizr Khan captured Delhi from last Tughlaq sultan, and established the short-lived Sayyid dynasty—the fourth dynasty of the Delhi Sultanate.

==== Langah Sultanate ====
Multan then passed to the Langah rulers, who established the Langah Sultanate in Multan under the rule of Rai Sahra Langah, who assumed the title Mahmud Shah. The reign of Shah Husayn, grandson of Mahmud Shah who ruled from 1469 to 1498, is considered to be most illustrious of the Langah sultans. Multan experienced prosperity during this period, and a large number of Baloch settlers arrived in the city at the invitation of Shah Husayn. The Sultanate's borders stretched encompassed the neighbouring regions surrounding the cities of Chiniot and Shorkot, including present-day Faisalabad. Shah Husayn successfully repulsed attempted invasion by the Delhi Sultans led by Tatar Khan and Barbak Shah.

Multan Sultanate came to an end in 1525 when the city was invaded by rulers of the Arghun dynasty.

==== Suri dynasty ====
In 1541, the Pashtun king Sher Shah Suri captured Multan, and successfully defended the city from the advances of the Mughal emperor Humayun. In 1543, Sher Shah Suri expelled the Baloch who under the command of Fateh Khan Mirani had overrun the city. Following its recapture, Sher Shah Suri ordered construction of a road between Lahore and Multan to connect Multan to his massive Grand Trunk Road project. Sher Shah Suri also renovated Delhi-Multan road, the ancient trade route had existed since the time of Ashoka or even earlier, to improve transit in the areas between Delhi and Multan, leading to Kandahar, Herat and eventually to Mashhad in Khorasan. It then served as the starting point for trade caravans from medieval India departing towards West Asia.

==== Medieval trade ====
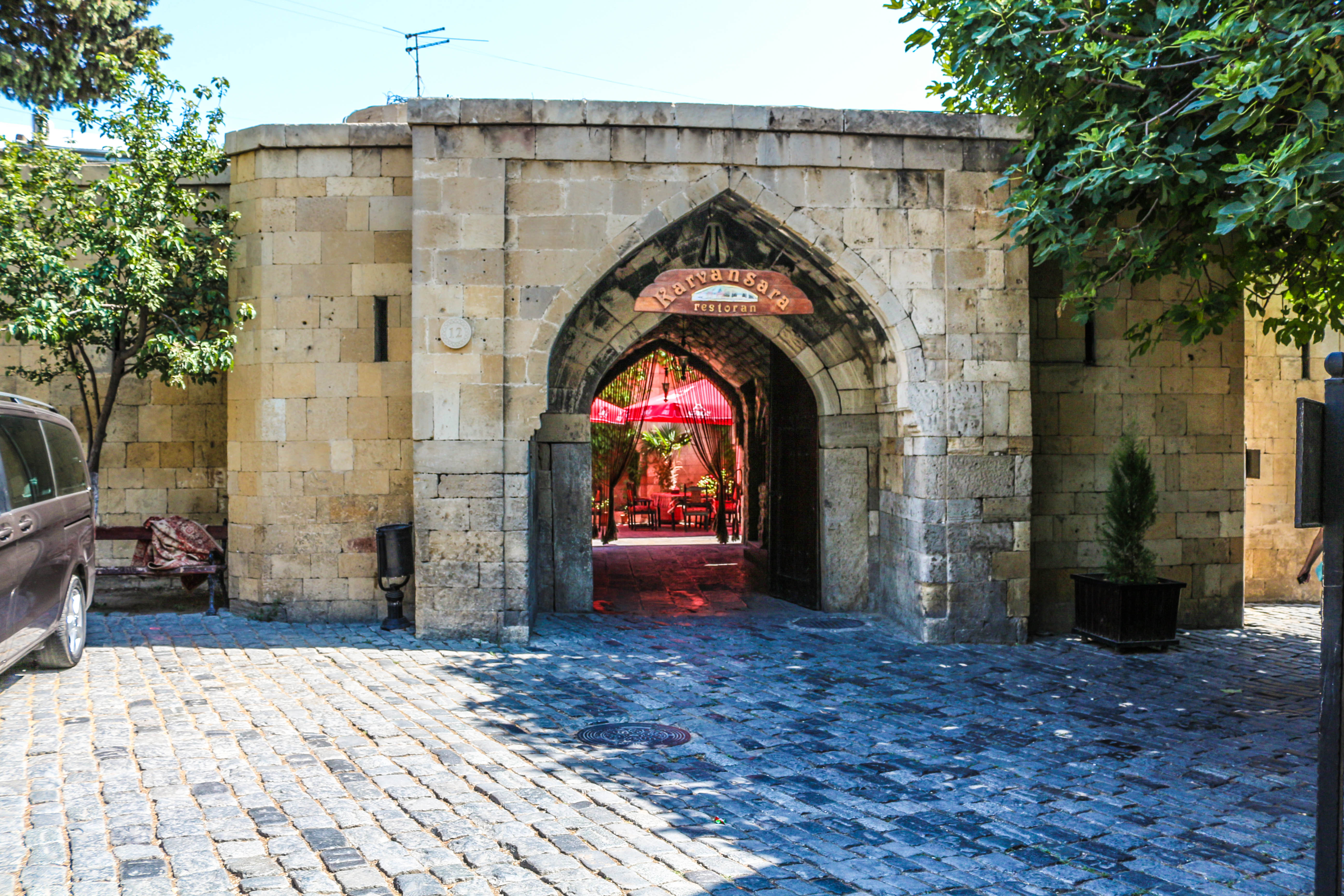
The 15th century Multani Caravanserai in Baku, Azerbaijan, was built to house visiting Multani merchants in the city.

Multan served as medieval Islamic India's trans-regional mercantile centre for trade with the Islamic world. It rose as an important trading and mercantile centre in the setting of political stability offered by the Delhi Sultanate, the Lodis, and Mughals.

The extent of Multan's influence is also reflected in the construction of the Multani Caravanserai in Baku, Azerbaijan—which was built in the 15th to house Multani merchants visiting the city. Legal records from the Uzbek city of Bukhara note that Multani merchants settled and owned land in the city in the late 1550s.

Multan would remain an important trading centre until the city was ravaged by repeated invasions in the 18th and 19th centuries in the post-Mughal era. Many of Multan's merchants then migrated to Shikarpur in Sindh, and were found throughout Central Asia up until the 19th century.

=== Mughal Empire ===
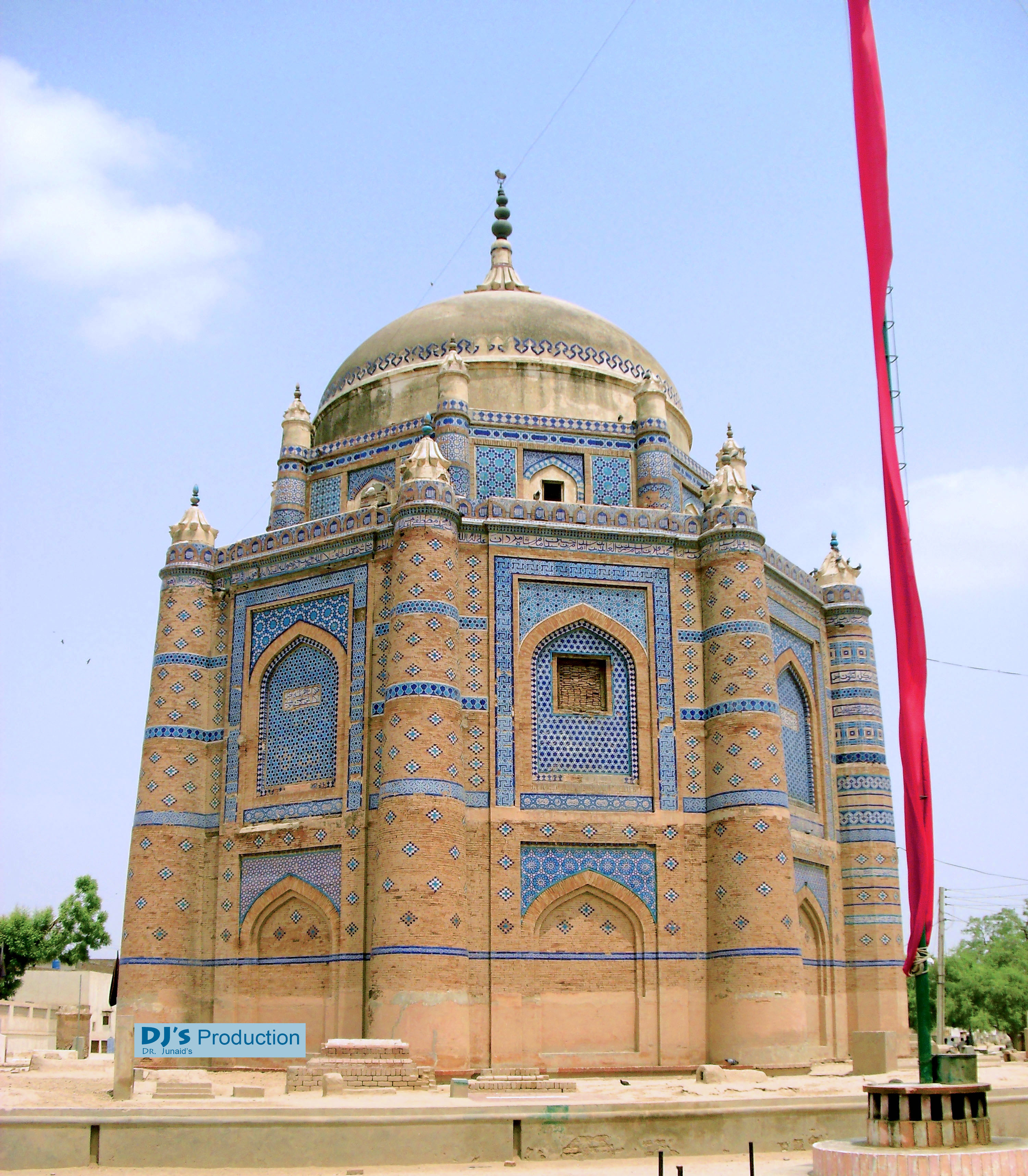
The Mausoleum of Shah Ali Akbar dating from the 1580s was built in the regional style that is typical of Multan's shrines.

Following the conquest of upper Sindh by the Mughal Emperor Akbar, Multan was attacked and captured by Akbar's army under the command of Bairam Khan in 1557, thereby re-establishing Mughal rule in Multan. The Mughals controlled the Multani region from 1524 until around 1739. Emperor Akbar created the Multan Subah with its headquarters at Multan city, which was one of his original twelve subahs (imperial top-level administrative provinces) roughly covering southern Punjab and northern Sindh, and bordered Kabul Subah, Lahore Subah, Ajmer Subah, Thatta Subah, the Persian Safavid Kandahar. It was one of Mughal Empire's largest provinces by land area and population.

In 1627, Multan was encircled by walls that were built on the order of Murad Baksh, son of Shah Jahan. Upon his return from an expedition to Balkh in 1648, the future emperor Aurangzeb was appointed Governor of provinces of Multan and Sindh—a post he held until 1652.

In 1680, the renowned Punjabi poet, Bulleh Shah, who is regarded as a saint by both Muslims and Sikhs, was born in Uch, Multan Subah.

In the second half of the 17th century, Multan's commercial fortunes were adversely affected by silting and shifting of the nearby river, which denied traders vital trade access to the Arabian Sea. Multan witnessed difficult times as the Mughal Empire waned in power following the death of Emperor Aurangzeb in 1707.

Under Mughal rule, Multan enjoyed 200 years of peace in a time when the city became known as Dar al-Aman ("Abode of Peace"). During the Mughal era, Multan was an important centre of agricultural production and manufacturing of cotton textiles. Multan was a centre for currency minting, as well as tile-making during the Mughal era.

Multan was also host to the offices of many commercial enterprises during the Mughal era, even in times when the Mughals were in control of the even more coveted city of Kandahar, given the unstable political situation resulting from frequent contestation of Kandahar with the Safavid Empire.

=== Afsharid invasion ===
Nader Shah conquered the region as part of his invasion of the Mughal Empire in 1739. Despite invasion, Multan remained northwest India's premier commercial centre throughout most of the 18th century.

=== Durrani and Maratha invasions ===
The last Mughal governor of Multan was Diwan Kaura Mal, a Punjabi Khatri from Shorkot, after whose death in the battle against Ahmad Shah Durrani the latter captured Multan in 1752, the city which was also his birthplace. The city's walls were rebuilt in 1756 by Ali Mohammad Khakwani, who also built the Ali Muhammad Khan Mosque in 1757. In 1758, Adina Arain established himself as the Nawab of Punjab with the assistance of the Marathas under Raghunathrao and also briefly seized Multan, leaving the city in the hands of Salih Muhammad Khan, though the city was recaptured by Abdali in 1760. After repeated invasions following the collapse of the Mughal Empire, Multan was reduced from being one of the most important early-modern commercial centres to a regional trading city.

=== Sikh Empire ===
In 1772, Ahmed Shah Durrani's son Timur Shah lost Multan to the Sikh misl, with Diwan Singh Chachowalia being appointed as governor. However, Multan's association with Sikhism predates this, as the founder of the Sikh religion, Guru Nanak, is said to have visited the city during one of his journeys.

The city was recaptured by Durranis under the suzerainty of Muzaffar Khan Sadozai in 1780. In 1817, Ranjit Singh sent a body of troops to Multan under the command of Diwan Bhiwani Das to receive from Nawab Muzaffar Khan the tribute he owed to the Sikh Darbar. In 1818, the armies of Kharak Singh and Misr Diwan Chand lay siege around Multan without making much initial headway, until Ranjit Singh dispatched the massive Zamzama cannon, which quickly led to the disintegration of the Multan's defences. Misr Diwan Chand led Sikh armies to a decisive victory over Muzaffar Khan. Muzaffar Khan and seven of his sons were killed before the Multan Fort finally fell on 2 March 1818.

The conquest of Multan established Ranjit Singh's superiority over the Afghans and ended their influence in this part of the Punjab. Diwan Sawan Mal Chopra, a Punjabi Khatri from Gujranwala, was appointed to govern the city, remaining in this post for the next quarter a century. Following the Sikh conquest, Multan declined in importance as a trading post, however the population of Multan rose from approximately 40,000 in 1827 to 60,000 by 1831. Sawan Mal adopted a policy of low taxation which generated immense land revenues for the state treasury. Following the death of Ranjit Singh, he ceased paying tribute to a successor and instead maintained alliances of convenience with selected Sikh aristocrats. He was assassinated in 1844, and succeeded by his son Diwan Mulraj Chopra, who unlike his father was seen as a despotic ruler by the local inhabitants.

==== 1848 Multan Revolt ====
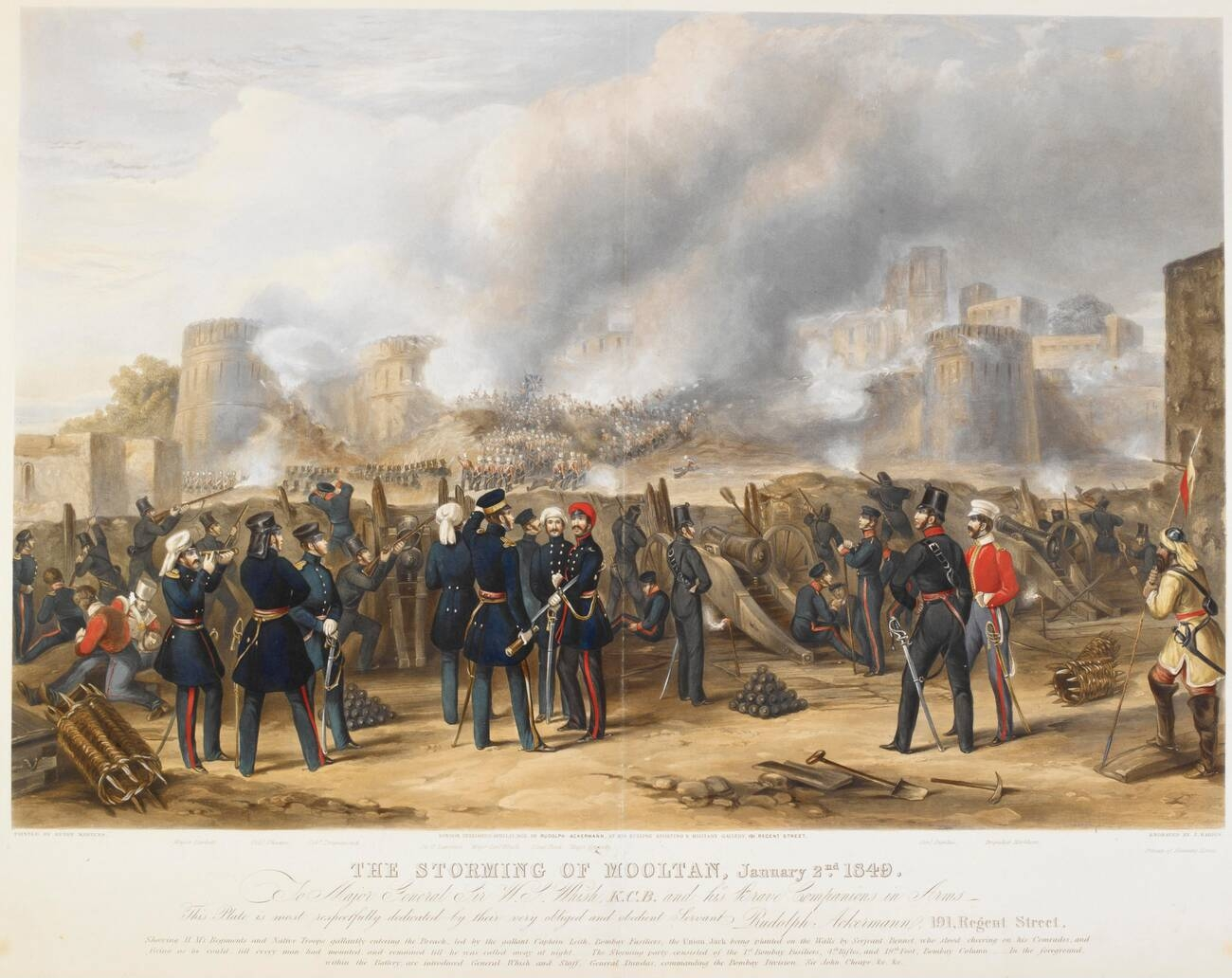
British Indian troops besieging Multan Fort in 1849

The 1848 revolt and subsequent siege of Multan began on 19 April 1848 when local Sikhs loyal to Diwan Mulraj Chopra murdered two emissaries of the British Raj, Vans Agnew and Lieutenant Anderson. The two British visitors were in Multan to attend a ceremony for Sardar Kahan Singh, who had been selected by the British East India Company to replace Diwan Mulraj Chopra as ruler of Multan.

Rebellion engulfed the Multan region under the leadership of Mulraj Chopra and Sher Singh Attariwalla. The Multan Revolt triggered the start of the Second Anglo-Sikh War, during which the sajjada nashin of the Shrine of Bahauddin Zakariya sided with the British to help defeat the Sikh rebels. The revolt eventually resulted in the fall of the Sikh Empire in 1849.

=== British Raj ===
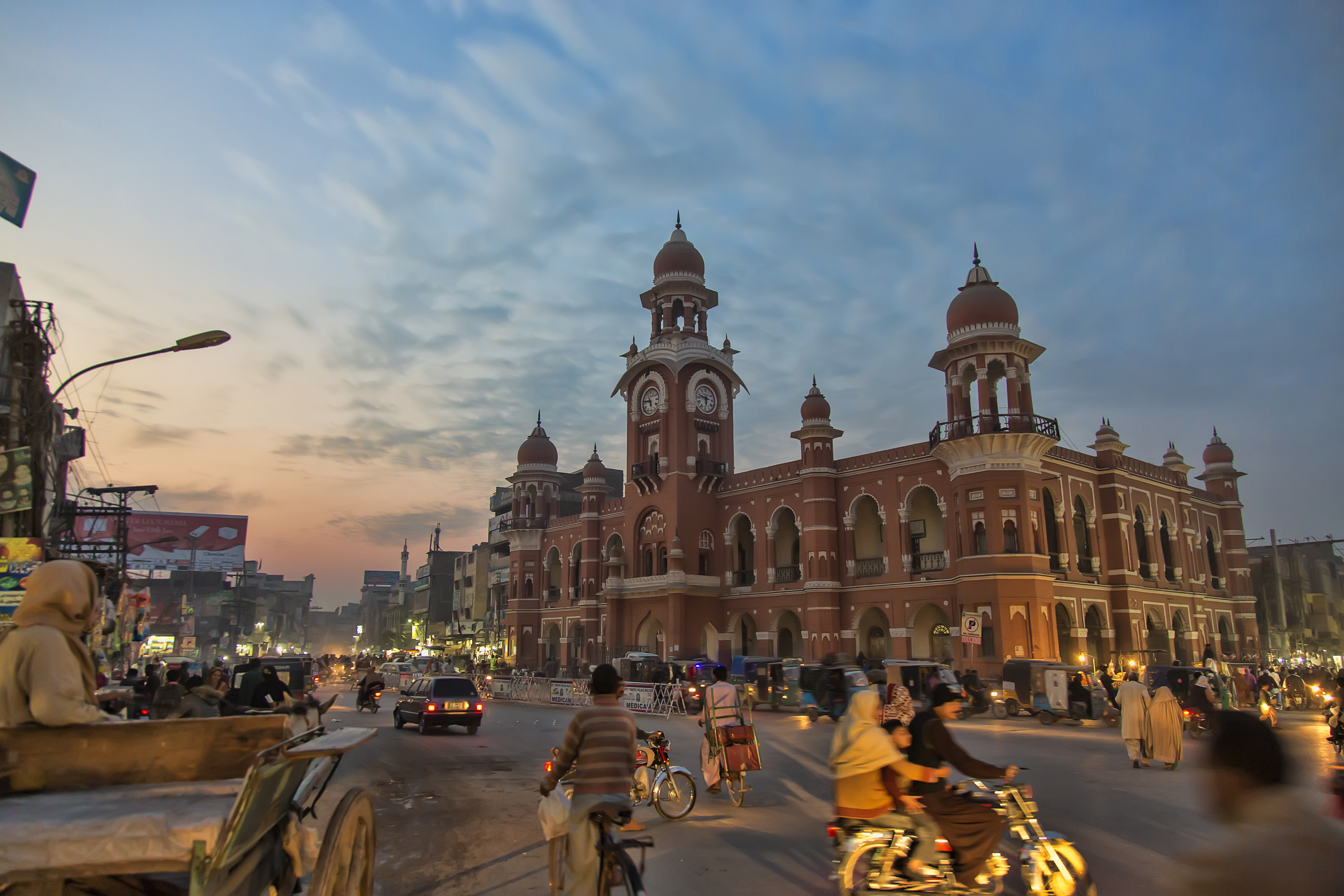
Multan Clock Tower dates from the British colonial period, and was built in the Indo-Saracenic style.

By December 1848, the British had captured portions of Multan city's outskirts, and destroyed the Multan Fort while bombarding the city. In January 1849, the British had amassed a force of 12,000 to conquer Multan. On 22 January 1849, the British had breached the walls of the Multan Fort, leading to the surrender of Mulraj and his forces to the British. The British conquest of the Sikh Empire was completed in February 1849, after the British victory at the Battle of Gujrat. Between the 1890s and 1920s, the British laid a vast network of canals in the Multan region and throughout much of central and Southern Punjab province. Thousands of "Canal Towns" and villages were built according to standardized plans throughout the newly irrigated swathes of land.

=== After independence of 1947 ===
Multan lost its importance as soon as the British stronghold over the subcontinent grew stronger and stronger. Although peace prevailed in the region but no real progress was made. After independence was achieved in 1947, Multan had become less significant politically. Though it was still 3rd largest district and division of the country but city and the large population of South Punjab region lacked self governance. The site of the Old Fort was in ruins. Thorny bushes and ditches were in plenty whispering the awful tale of its ruination. Majority of the roads were unmetalled and the sewerage system too defective to explain.

The predominantly Muslim population supported Muslim League and Pakistan Movement. After the independence of Pakistan in 1947, the minority Hindus and Sikhs migrated to India en masse, while some Muslim refugees from the newly independent Republic of India settled in the city. Today, it is one of the country's six largest urban centres and remains an important settlement in the Southern Punjab.

== Geography ==
=== Topography ===
Multan is located in Punjab, and covers an area of 560 square kilometres (220 sq mi). The nearest important cities are Dera Ghazi Khan and Bahawalpur. Multan is located near few rivers of central Pakistan. The Sutlej River separates it from Bahawalpur and the Chenab River from Muzaffargarh. The area around the city is a flat, alluvial plain surrounded by orchards and deserts that is also used for mango farms.

Multan is located near the Sulaiman Mountain Range which is the extension of the southern Hindu Kush of Pakistan and Afghanistan. The most well-known peak of the Sulaiman mountains is the twin-peaked Takht-e-Sulaiman or "Throne of Prophet Solomon" at 3,487 metres (11,440 ft).

=== Climate ===
Multan features a hot desert climate (Köppen climate classification BWh) with extremely hot summers and mild winters. The normal annual precipitation measures around 200 millimetres (7.9 in).

Multan is known for having some of the hottest weather in Pakistan. The highest recorded temperature is 50.0 °C (122.0 °F) recorded on May 27 2010, and the lowest recorded temperature is approximately −2.2 °C (28.0 °F).

Climate data for Multan (1991–2020)
Month	Jan	Feb	Mar	Apr	May	Jun	Jul	Aug	Sep	Oct	Nov	Dec	Year
Record high °C (°F)	28.3 (82.9)	32.0 (89.6)	39.0 (102.2)	45.0 (113.0)	50.0 (122.0)	48.0 (118.4)	46.0 (114.8)	45.0 (113.0)	42.5 (108.5)	40.8 (105.4)	36.0 (96.8)	29.0 (84.2)	50.0 (122.0)
Mean daily maximum °C (°F)	19.7 (67.5)	23.3 (73.9)	28.7 (83.7)	35.8 (96.4)	40.9 (105.6)	41.6 (106.9)	39.0 (102.2)	37.4 (99.3)	36.4 (97.5)	34.0 (93.2)	28.1 (82.6)	22.5 (72.5)	32.3 (90.1)
Daily mean °C (°F)	12.7 (54.9)	16.2 (61.2)	21.5 (70.7)	28.6 (83.5)	33.4 (92.1)	35.3 (95.5)	34.1 (93.4)	32.4 (90.3)	31.0 (87.8)	26.8 (80.2)	20.3 (68.5)	14.9 (58.8)	25.6 (78.1)
Mean daily minimum °C (°F)	5.7 (42.3)	9.0 (48.2)	14.6 (58.3)	20.5 (68.9)	25.9 (78.6)	28.9 (84.0)	29.2 (84.6)	28.2 (82.8)	25.7 (78.3)	19.5 (67.1)	12.5 (54.5)	7.2 (45.0)	18.9 (66.1)
Record low °C (°F)	−2.2 (28.0)	−1.0 (30.2)	3.3 (37.9)	9.4 (48.9)	13.5 (56.3)	18.5 (65.3)	21.1 (70.0)	21.1 (70.0)	16.7 (62.1)	8.9 (48.0)	0.6 (33.1)	−1.1 (30.0)	−2.2 (28.0)
Average precipitation mm (inches)	7.5 (0.30)	17.6 (0.69)	20.3 (0.80)	14.3 (0.56)	13.5 (0.53)	17.6 (0.69)	49.1 (1.93)	43.5 (1.71)	32.8 (1.29)	7.6 (0.30)	1.3 (0.05)	6.1 (0.24)	231.2 (9.09)
Average precipitation days (≥ 1.0 mm)	1.6	2.4	2.6	2.8	1.7	1.9	3.0	3.1	1.6	0.9	0.3	0.9	22.8
Average relative humidity (%)	58	52	48	39	33	39	55	58	55	49	56	61	50
Mean monthly sunshine hours	181.5	190.2	241.1	266.2	283.1	252.7	248.5	253.9	257.6	262.1	216.4	198.4	2,851.7
Source 1: NOAA
Source 2: Deutscher Wetterdienst (humidity 1951-1990)

Multan's climate is primarily influenced by:

- Western Disturbances which generally occurs during the winter months between December and February. The Western Disturbance provokes moderate rainfall, with hailstorms also sometimes occurring.
- Deforestation, dust storms occur during summer months. The region has seen large scale deforestation in last decades resulting in dust storms. Multan's dust storm sometimes produce violent wind.
- Heat waves occur during the hottest months of May and June, and can result in temperatures approaching 50 °C (122 °F)
- South West Monsoon occurs following the hottest months of the year, and lasts between June and September. Monsoon rains moderate temperatures, and can sometimes produce heavy rain storms.
- Continental air prevails during the remaining months generally yields clear weather with little to no precipitation.

== Cityscape ==
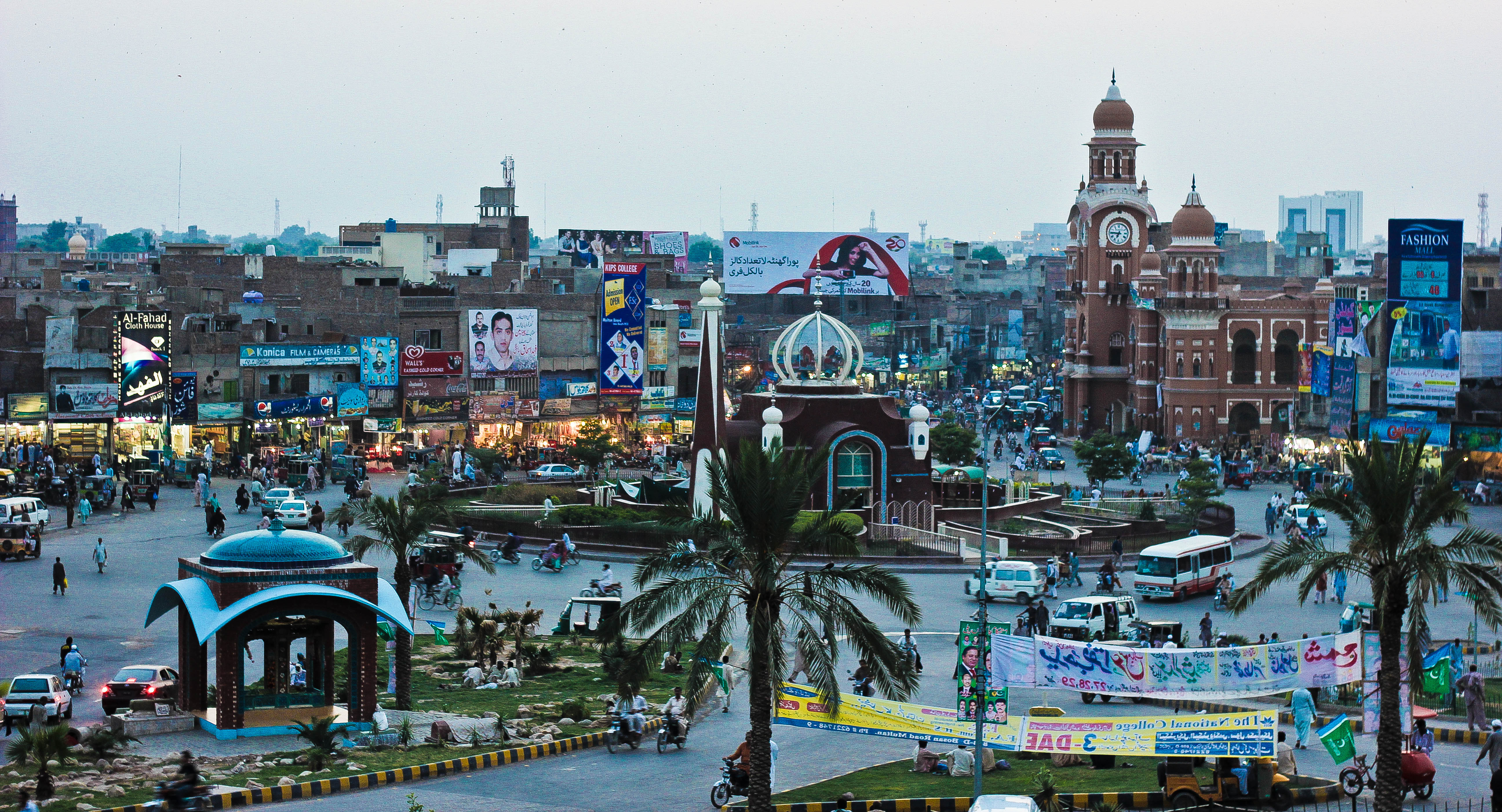
Multan Cityscape

Multan's urban typology is similar to other ancient cities in South Asia, such as Peshawar, Lahore, and Delhi, all of which were founded near a major river, and included an old walled city, as well as a royal citadel. Unlike those cities, Multan has lost its royal citadel, as it was largely destroyed by the British in 1848, which negatively impacted the urban fabric of the city.

Multan's old neighbourhood homes exemplify concerns regarding privacy and defense against the city's harsh climate. The urban morphology is characterized by small and private cul-de-sacs branching off of bazaars and larger arteries.

A distinct Multani style of architecture began taking root in the 14th century with the establishment of funerary monuments, and is characterized by large brick walls reinforced by wooden anchors, with inward sloping roofs. Funerary architecture is also reflected in the city's residential quarters, which borrow architectural and decorative elements from Multan's mausolea.

== Demographics ==
Population

Historical population

Year	Pop.	±% p.a.
1881	68,674	—
1891	74,562	+0.83%
1901	87,394	+1.60%
1911	99,243	+1.28%
1921	84,806	−1.56%
1931	119,457	+3.49%
1941	143,000	+1.82%

Year	Pop.	±% p.a.
1951	190,000	+2.88%
1961	358,000	+6.54%
1972	539,000	+3.79%
1981	732,000	+3.46%
1998	1,197,384	+2.94%
2017	1,827,001	+2.25%
2023	2,215,381	+3.26%

Multan city had a population of 1,078,245 in the 1998 census. In 2017 census, Multan's population jumped to 1.827 million. Multan had a sex ratio of 950 females per 1000 males and a literacy rate of 74.69%: 77.50% for males and 71.74% for females. 440,112 (24.09%) were under 10 years of age. The figure increased to 2.215 million in the 2023 Pakistani census.

=== Language ===
At the time of the 2023 census, 42.69% of the population spoke Saraiki, 30.13% Urdu, 24.97% Punjabi and 1.15% Pashto as their first language.

Languages of Multan MC (2023)
1. Saraiki (42.7%)
2. Urdu (30.1%)
3. Punjabi (25.0%)
4. Pashto (1.20%)
5. Others (1.00%)

=== Religion ===
Islam is the predominant religion, with 98.63% of the population, with Christians making up 1.26%. 1598 people are Hindu and 78 are Sikh.

Religious groups in Multan City (1868–2023)
Religious group	1868		1881		1891		1901		1911		1921		1931		1941		2017		2023	
Religious group	Pop.	%	Pop.	%	Pop.	%	Pop.	%	Pop.	%	Pop.	%	Pop.	%	Pop.	%	Pop.	%	Pop.	%
Islam	24,828	54.44%	36,294	52.85%	39,765	53.33%	46,899	53.66%	55,686	56.11%	55,864	65.87%	72,134	60.38%	81,613	57.16%	1,808,475	98.99%	2,133,906	98.63%
Hinduism (Note: 1931–1941: Including Ad-Dharmis)	19,812	43.45%	29,962	43.63%	32,130	43.09%	36,947	42.28%	38,341	38.63%	25,339	29.88%	41,999	35.16%	56,602	39.65%	1,728	0.09%	1,598	0.07%
Christianity	195	0.43%	—N/a	—N/a	1,672	2.24%	1,777	2.03%	2,105	2.12%	1,955	2.31%	1,823	1.53%	680	0.48%	15,766	0.86%	27,236	1.26%
Sikhism	83	0.18%	661	0.96%	961	1.29%	1,588	1.82%	2,659	2.68%	1,573	1.85%	2,960	2.48%	2,665	1.87%	—N/a	—N/a	78	0%
Jainism	—N/a	—N/a	46	0.07%	24	0.03%	134	0.15%	388	0.39%	28	0.03%	424	0.35%	499	0.35%	—N/a	—N/a	—N/a	—N/a
Zoroastrianism	—N/a	—N/a	—N/a	—N/a	9	0.01%	49	0.06%	58	0.06%	47	0.06%	117	0.1%	—N/a	—N/a	—N/a	—N/a	2	0%
Judaism	—N/a	—N/a	—N/a	—N/a	0	0%	—N/a	—N/a	6	0.01%	0	0%	0	0%	—N/a	—N/a	—N/a	—N/a	—N/a	—N/a
Ahmadiyya	—N/a	—N/a	—N/a	—N/a	—N/a	—N/a	—N/a	—N/a	—N/a	—N/a	—N/a	—N/a	—N/a	—N/a	—N/a	—N/a	928	0.05%	501	0.02%
Others	684	1.5%	1,711	2.49%	1	0%	0	0%	0	0%	0	0%	0	0%	929	0.65%	104	0.01%	205	0.01%
Total population	45,602	100%	68,674	100%	74,562	100%	87,394	100%	99,243	100%	84,806	100%	119,457	100%	142,768	100%	1,827,001	100%	2,163,526	100%
1881–1941: Data for the entirety of the town of Multan, which included Multan Municipality and Multan Cantonment. 2017–2023: Urban population of Multan City tehsil, which is the extent of the Multan Metropolitan Corporation

== Civic administration ==
Administrators who are government servants have the powers of Nazims (Mayor). Multan District is spread over an area of 3,721 square kilometres, comprising four tehsils: Multan City, Multan Saddar, Shujabad and Jalalpur Pirwala.

The area under Multan Development Authority (MDA) is 560 square kilometres, covering almost all important establishments like Bahauddin Zakariya University (BZU), Pak Arab Fertilizers Industrial Estate, and others.

In 2005 Multan was reorganised as a City District composed of six autonomous towns:

- Bosan
- Shah Rukan e Alam
- Mumtazabad
- Sher Shah
- Shujabad
- Jalalpur Pirwala

== Residential areas ==
- Shah Rukan e Alam
- Multan Cantt
- Shah Faisal Colony
- Gulgasht Colony
- Zakariya Town

== Transportation ==
=== Motorways and highways ===
Multan is connected to operational motorways M4 on northside connecting to Faisalabad and M5 on south side connecting Sukkar. M4 is further connected to M3 connecting Lahore and M2 connecting Islamabad and Peshawar to Multan. While M5 will be connecting to Karachi via Karachi-Lahore Motorway in future.

Multan is situated along the under-construction 6-lane Karachi–Lahore Motorway (M3) connecting Southern and northern Pakistan that is being built as part of the $54 billion China Pakistan Economic Corridor. Currently, Lahore to Multan travel time is 4 hours on motorway M3 and M4.

The 6-lane, 392-kilometre long M-5 section of the motorway is built between Sukkur and Multan at a cost $2.89 billion. The M-5 is open since 2019. It is connecting Multan to Sukkar and will connect to Karachi when Sukkar-Karachi Motorway will be opened.

Multan is also connected to the city of Faisalabad via the M-4 motorway, which in turn is connected to the M-1 and M-2 motorways that provide access to Islamabad and Peshawar. Further links with the Karakoram Highway will provide access to Xinjiang, China, and Central Asia

The National Highway 70, or the N-70, is one of the National Highways of Pakistan. It runs from the city of Multan in Punjab to the town of Qilla Saifullah via Dera Ghazi Khan, and Loralai and further to Quetta in Balochistan province. Its total length is 440 kilometres (270 mi) divided into 254 kilometres (158 mi) in Balochistan and the remaining 186 km (116 mi) in the Punjab. It is maintained and operated by Pakistan's National Highway Authority.

=== Railways ===
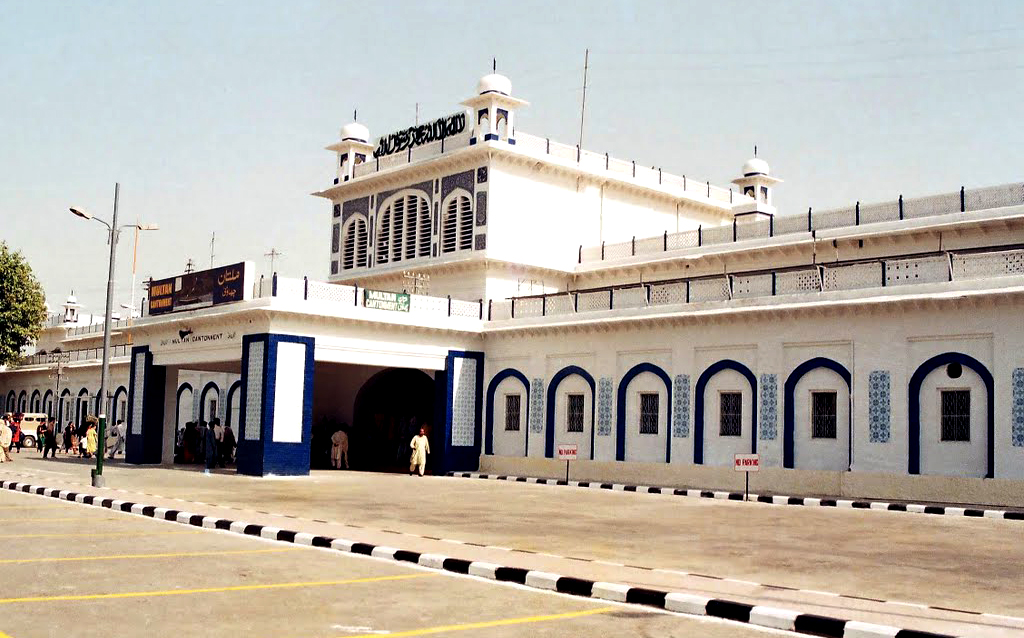
Cantonment railway station serves as the city's main railway station.

Multan is connected by rail with all parts of the country and lies on the main track between Karachi, Peshawar, Lahore and Quetta. The Main Line-1 Railway that links Karachi and Peshawar passes through Multan district is being overhauled as part of the China Pakistan Economic Corridor. As part of the project, railways will be upgraded to permit train travel at speeds of up to 160 kilometres per hour, versus the average 60 to 105 km per hour speed currently possible on existing track, The project is divided into three phases, with the Peshawar to Multan portion to be completed as part of the project's first phase by 2018, and the entire project is expected to be complete by 2021.

From Multan, links to Khanewal, Lodhran and Muzafargarh are offered by rail. Multan Cantonment railway station is the main railway station of Multan.

=== Bus rapid transit (Metro Bus) ===
The Multan Metrobus is a bus rapid transit line which commenced service in January 2017, at a cost of 28.8 billion rupees. The BRT route serves 21 stations over the course of 18.5 kilometres, of which 12.5 kilometres are elevated. 14 stations are elevated, while the remainder are at street level. The BRT route begins at Bahauddin Zakariya University in northern Multan, and heads southward to pass by the eastern edge of Multan's old city at the Daulat Gate before turning east to finally terminate at the Kumharanwala Chowk in eastern Multan.

The route will be served initially by 35 buses, serving up to 95,000 passengers per day (or less than this but mostly students are using it). The Multan Metrobus is planned to ultimately have total of 4 BRT lines covering 68.82 kilometres, which will be complemented by feeder lines.

=== Air ===
Multan International Airport offers flights throughout Pakistan, and direct flights to Bahrain, Oman, Qatar, Saudi Arabia, and the United Arab Emirates.

Multan International Airport is located 10 km west of Multan's city centre, in the Multan Cantonment. The airport offers flights throughout Pakistan, as well as to the Persian Gulf States.

In March 2015, a new terminal building was formally inaugurated by Pakistani Prime Minister Nawaz Sharif. Following the opening of the new terminal, passenger traffic soared from 384,571 in 2014–2015, to 904,865 in 2015–2016.

== Education ==
Bahauddin Zakariya University is the largest university in Multan. It is the second largest university in the province, after the University of the Punjab.

Other educational institutions in the city include:

- National University of Computer & Emerging Sciences
- Air University Multan Campus
- Nishtar Medical University
- National University of Modern Languages, Multan
- Emerson University
- Multan Public School
- MNS University of Engineering and Technology, Multan
- MNS University of Agriculture
- NFC Institute of Engineering and Technology
- Pakistan Institute of Engineering & Technology
- The Women University Multan
- University of Southern Punjab
- Virtual University of Pakistan

== Heritage ==
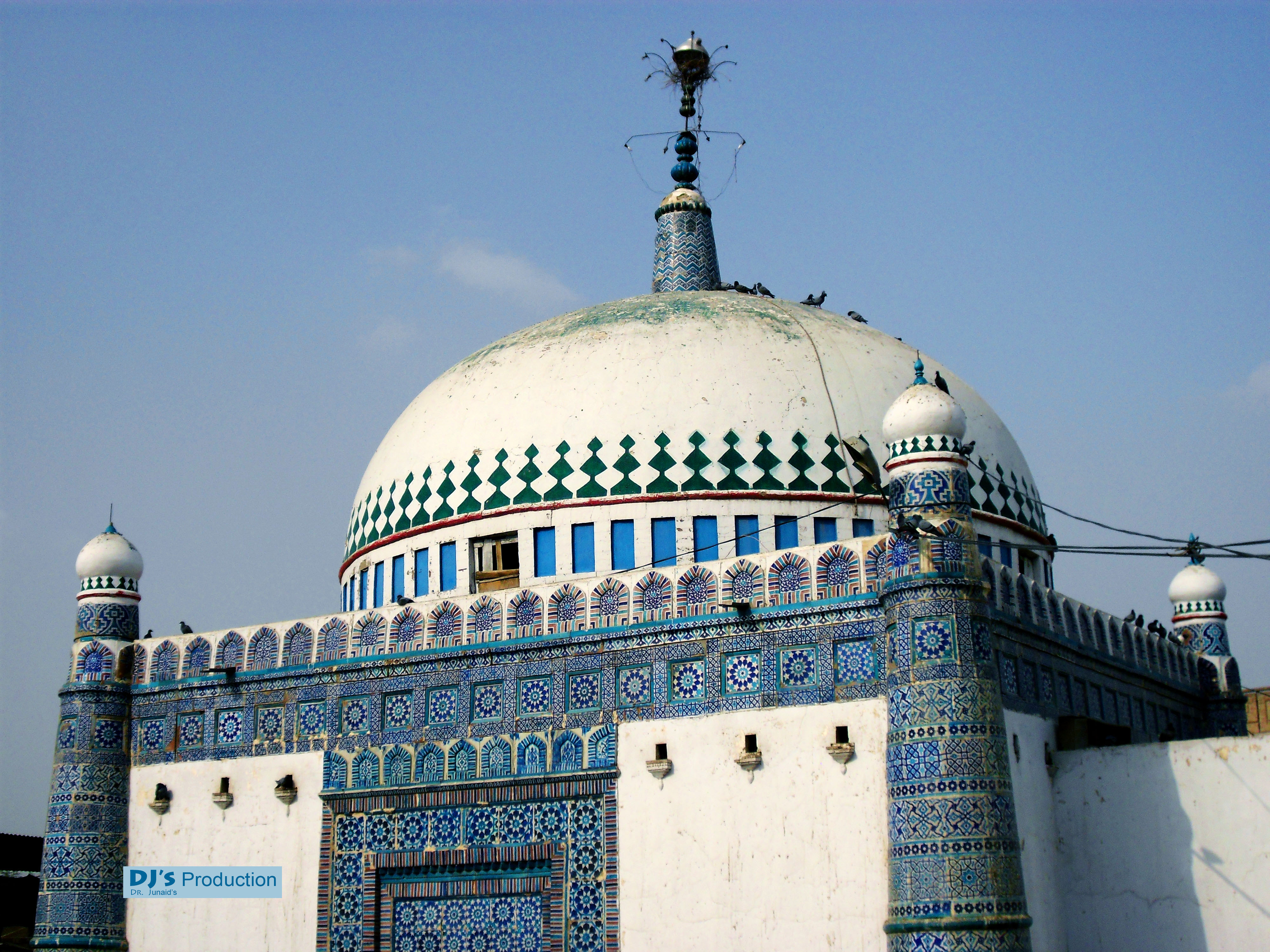
The tomb of Khawaja Awais Kagha displays use of traditional Multan tile-work on both its exterior and interior.

=== Religious sites ===
The remains of Prahladpuri Temple is located on top of a raised platform inside the Multan Fort, adjacent to the tomb of Bahauddin Zakariya. A mosque has been subsequently built adjacent to temple. The original temple is said to have been built by Prahlad, son of Hiranyakashipu, the king of Multan (Kashya-papura).

=== Notable saints of Multan ===
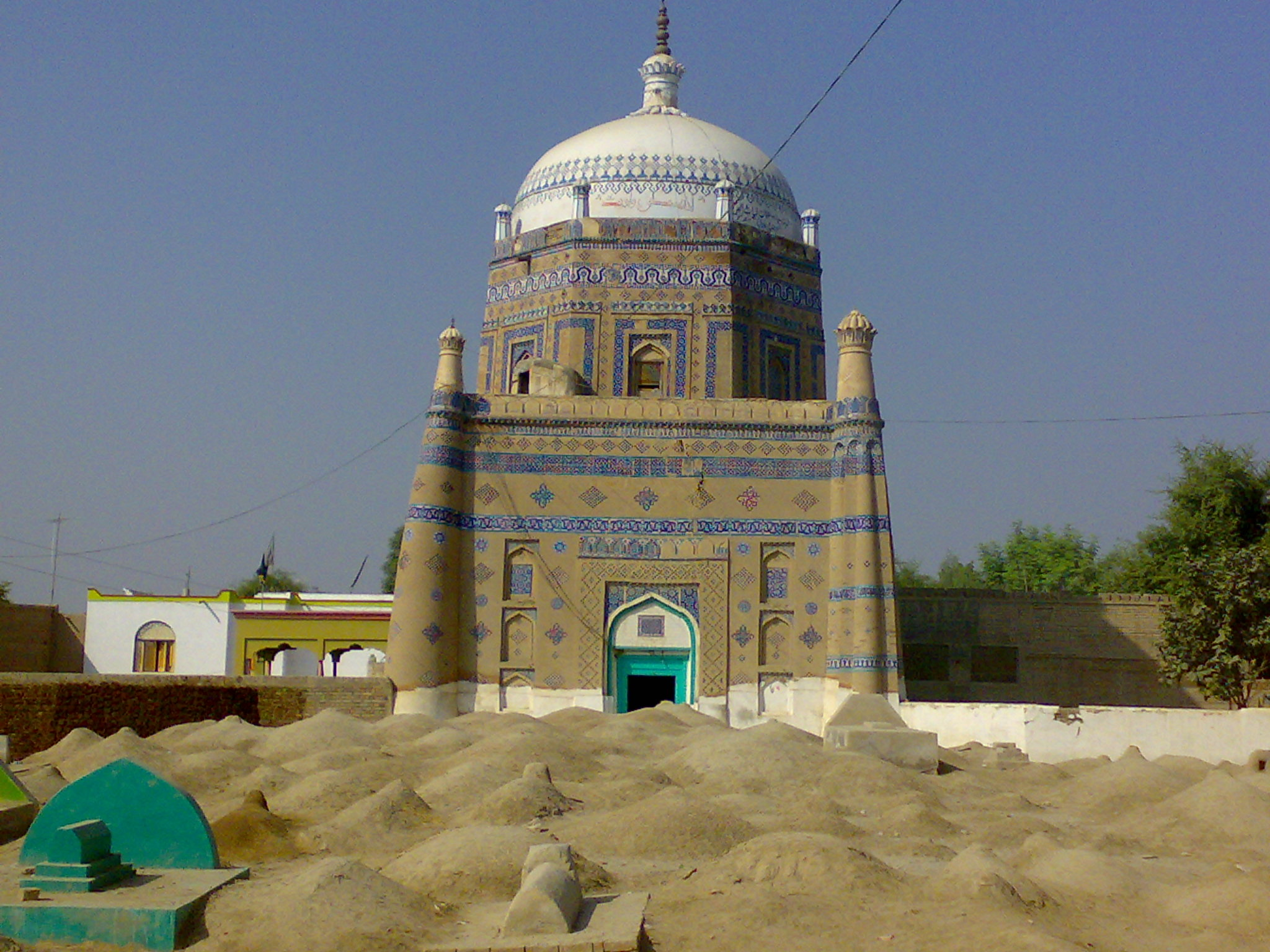
The shrine of Pir Adil Shah.

- Shah Yousaf Gardezi (d. 1136), tomb located inner Bohar Gate Multan
- Mai Maharban (11/12th Century), tomb located near Chowk Fawara, children complex Multan
- Bahauddin Zakariya (1170–1267), tomb located in Multan Fort
- Shah Rukne Alam (1251–1335), tomb located in Multan Fort
- Syed Musa Pak (d. 1592)
- Hafiz Muhammad Jamal Multani (1747–1811)
- Syed Ata Ullah Shah Bukhari (1892–1961), buried in Jalal Bakri
- Syed Noor ul Hassan Bukhari (1902–1983), buried in Jalal Bakri
- Ahmad Saeed Kazmi (1913–1986), buried in Eid Gah, Multan

== Sports ==
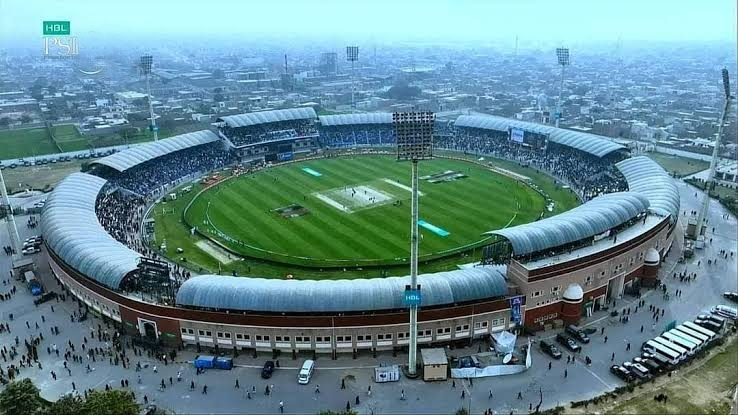
Multan Cricket Stadium

The Multan Cricket Stadium has hosted many international cricket matches. Ibn-e-Qasim Bagh Stadium is the other stadium in Multan which is usually used for football along with other sports activities.

Multan is home to the Multan Sultans, the franchise of Pakistan Super League. Multan Tigers, the domestic cricket team which had participated in domestic limited over tournaments was also based in the city. Multan and its division has produced many international cricketers like Inzamam-ul-Haq, Waqar Younis, Mushtaq Ahmed, Elahi Brothers, Mohammad Zahid, Sohaib Maqsood, Rahat Ali, Asmavia Iqbal and Sania Khan.

Professional teams of Multan
Club	League	Sport	Venue	Established
Multan Sultans	Pakistan Super League	Cricket	Multan Cricket Stadium	2018
Multan Tigers	National One Day Championship/National T20 Cup	Cricket	Multan Cricket Stadium	2004

== Notable people ==
- Rukn-e-Alam, 14th century Punjabi saint
- Shah Mehmood Qureshi, former Foreign Minister of Pakistan
- Yousaf Raza Gillani, former Prime Minister of Pakistan
- Javed Hashmi, former Federal Minister
- Malik Muhammad Rafique Rajwana, former Governor of Punjab
- Ghiyath al din Tughlaq, Governor of Multan and emperor of Indian subcontinent
- Bahauddin Zakariya, Sufi saint
- Khizr Khan, 15th century emperor of the Indian subcontinent
- Fariduddin Ganjshakar, 12th-century Punjabi Muslim preacher and mystic
- Inzamam-ul-Haq, former cricketer and captain
- Diwan Mulraj Chopra, Sikh-era governor
- Mazhar Kaleem, Pakistani writer and novelist
- H. Gobind Khorana, Nobel laureate

== Sister cities ==
- Konya, Turkey
- Rasht, Iran
- Shihezi, China
- Xi'an, China (28 March 2019)
- Bukhara, Uzbekistan

== See also ==
- List of rulers of Multan
- List of places in Multan
- Multan Museum
- Multani Caravanserai
