= Bahauddin Zakariya =

Sufi saint (1170–1267)

Coordinates: 30°12′02″N 71°28′35″E

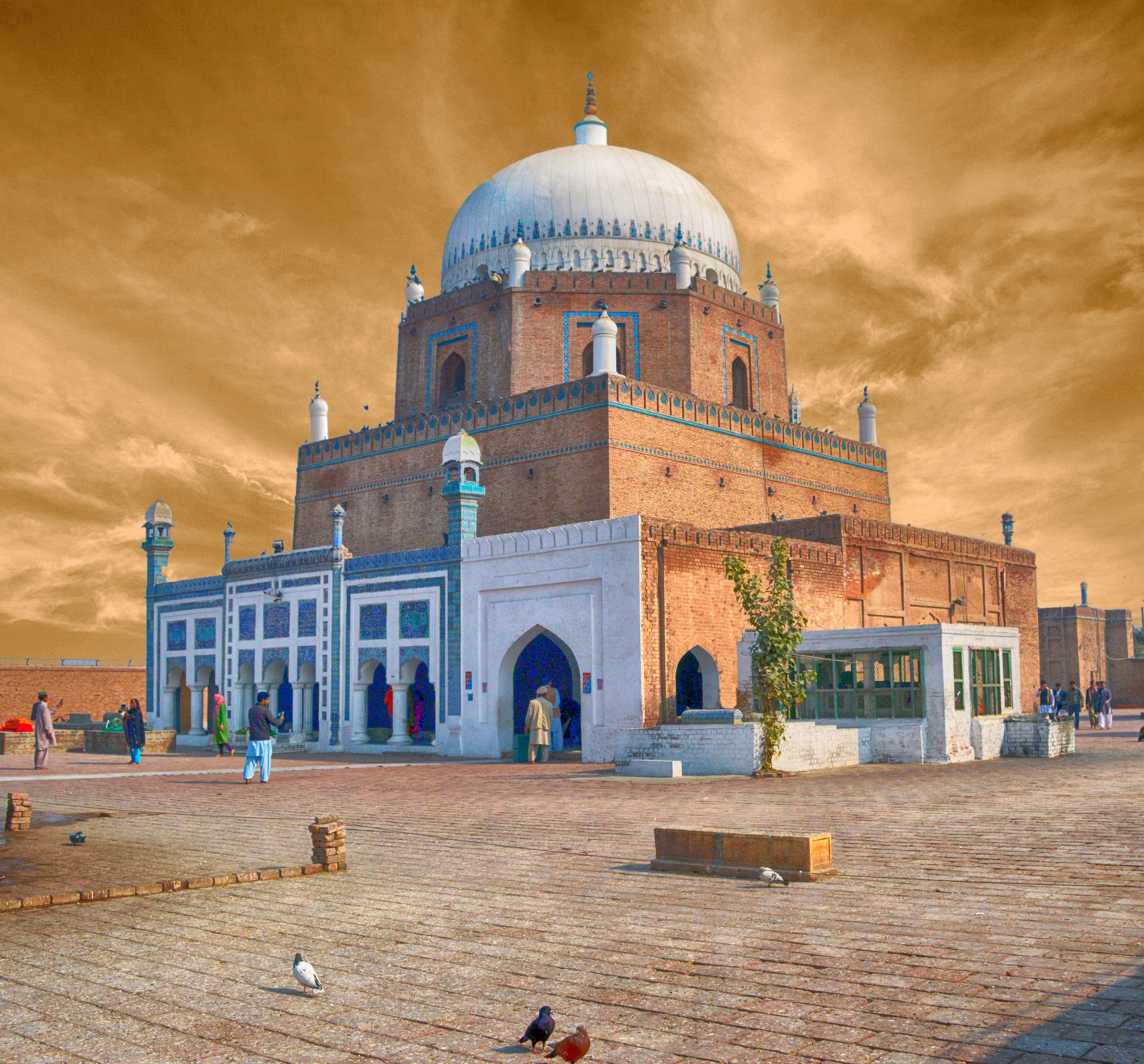
- Title: Hadrat, Sheikh (Ghous-ul-Aalamin)

Personal life
- Born: 1161 or 1182 Kut Karur, Punjab (present-day Pakistan)
- Died: 21 December 1262 Multan, Delhi Sultanate

Religious life
- Religion: Islam
- Denomination: Sunni, specifically the Suhrawardiyya Sufi order

Muslim leader
- Based in: Multan, Punjab
- Period in office: 12th/13th century
- Predecessor: Shihab al-Din 'Umar al-Suhrawardi
- Successor: Various, including Lal Shahbaz Qalander, Fakhr ud din Iraqi

Bahauddin Zakariya (Note: also spelled Bahauddin Zakariya) (c.1170 – 1262), also known as Baha-ul-Haq, was a Sunni Muslim scholar, saint and poet who established the Suhrawardiyya order of Baghdad in medieval South Asia, later becoming one of the most influential spiritual leaders of his era.

== Life ==
Zakariya was born in 1161 or 1182. His family was of Hashimid lineage, and thus traced their descent back to Asad ibn Hashim, one of the ancestors of the Islamic prophet Muhammad. Baha al-Din's family was originally from the Khwarazm region in Central Asia, but had settled in Kut Karur in the Punjab region, near the city of Multan. His father was Wajih al-Din Muhammad, while his mother was the daughter of Husam al-Din Tirmidhi.

For fifteen years, Zakariya travelled to different cities in southern Punjab, where the order was able to attract large numbers of converts from Hinduism. Zakariya finally settled in Multan in 1222. Under his influence, Multan became known as "Baghdad of the East," and is referred by Zakariya in his Persian poetry:

Multan ma ba jannat a'la barabara
Ahista pa ba-nah ke malik sajda mi kunad.

Translation:

Multan of ours is equal to high Paradise
Tread slowly, the angels are in prostration here.

Zakariya became a vocal critic of Multan's ruler at the time, Nasir-ud-Din Qabacha, and sided with Iltutmish, the Mamluk Sultan of Delhi when he overthrew Qabacha in 1228. Zakariya's support was crucial for Iltutmish's victory, and so he was awarded the title Shaikh-ul-Islam by Iltutmish to oversee the state's spiritual matters, in gratitude for his support. Zakariya was also granted official state patronage by the Sultan.

During his lifetime, Zakariya befriended Lal Shahbaz Qalandar - a widely revered Sufi saint from Sindh, and founder of the Qalandariyya order of wandering dervishes. As Shaikh-ul-Islam, Zakariya was able to assuage orthodox Muslims, who were offended by the Lal Shahbaz Qalandar's teachings. Zakariya, Shahbaz Qalandar, Baba Farid and Syed Jalalauddin Bukhari, together became the legendary Haq Char Yaar, or "Four friends" group, which is highly revered among South Asian Muslims.

== Spiritual philosophy ==
Zakariya's Tariqat, or Sufi philosophical orientation, was to the renowned Persian Sufi master Shahab al-Din Abu Hafs Umar Suhrawardi of Baghdad. The Suhrawardi order rejected a life of poverty, as espoused by the Chisti order that was more prevalent in the Lahore region. Instead, the Suhrawardis believed in ordinary food and clothing, and rejected the Chisti assertion that spirituality lay upon a foundation of poverty. The Suhrawardis also rejected the early Chisti practice of dissociation from the political State.

Zakariya's preachings emphasized the need to conform to usual Islamic practices like fasting (roza) and alms-giving (zakat), but also advocated a philosophy of scholarship (ilm) combined with spirituality. His emphasis on teaching all humans, regardless of class or ethnicity, set him apart from his contemporary Hindu mystics.

He did not reject the traditional of spiritual music that was heavily emphasized in Chisti worship, but only partook in it on occasion. He rejected the Chisti tradition of bowing in reverence to religious leaders - a practice that may have been borrowed from Hinduism.

== Impact ==
Zakariya's teachings spread widely throughout southern Punjab and Sindh, and drew large numbers of converts from Hinduism. His successors continued to exert strong influences over southern Punjab for the next several centuries, while his order spread further east into regions of northern India, especially in Gujarat and Bengal.

== Shrine ==
Baha-ud-Din Zakariya died in 1268 and his mausoleum (Darbar) is located in Multan. The mausoleum is a square of 51 ft 9 in (15.77 m), measured internally. Above this is an octagon, about half the height of the square, which is surmounted by a hemispherical dome. The mausoleum was almost completely ruined during the Siege of Multan in 1848 by the British, but was soon afterward restored by local Muslims.

Many pilgrims visit his shrine at the time of his urs from different parts of Pakistan and beyond.

== Writings ==
- Awrad-e-Shaikhush Shuyukh: Al-Awrad : Awrad-e-Suhrawardy

( اوراد شيخ‌ الشيوخ‌ : الاوراد : اوراد سهروردي‌)

== Commemorative honors ==
- Bahauddin Zakaria Express train is named after him, which runs between Karachi and Multan.
- Bahauddin Zakariya University located in Multan is named after him which is the largest institution in southern Punjab.

== Sources ==
- Arya, Gholam-Ali (2015). "Bahāʾ al-Dīn Abū Muḥammad Zakariyyāʾ Multānī". In Fleet, Kate; Krämer, Gudrun; Matringe, Denis; Nawas, John; Rowson, Everett (eds.). Encyclopaedia of Islam (3rd ed.). Brill Online. ISSN 1873-9830.
