= History of Multan =

Multan in Punjab province of Pakistan, is one of the oldest cities of South Asia, though its exact age has yet to be determined. Multan is known for its rich ancient heritage and historic landmarks. Multan was the capital and primary cultural centre of Punjab region in the bulk of; later ancient and medieval eras . A historic hub of Indian subcontinent, Multan was centre of many civilizations in its 5 millennia old history.

Multan was made a separate state, the Emirate of Multan including in its limits parts of Punjab and Kashmir during the Arab rule of 9th and (or) 10th century. It is famous for its Sufi shrines. Province of Multan was one of the largest established provinces of the Mughal Empire.

== Ancient era ==
Multan was founded by great grandson of Prophet Noah before 3000 BC era, according to the historian Firishta. It was home to ancient Indo Aryan civilization. According to Hindu tradition the ancient name of Multan was ''Mulasthana'' and the current name Multan was possibly associated with the Mallian people inhabiting the region, who also faced Greek army and were defeated by Alexander the Great's army after a fierce battle. "Once Keshap Pura (Multan) was capital of the Raja Hurnakas.

Darius the great's invasion

Multan was conquered and included in the province of Arachosia by Achaemenid ruler Darius the great in 500 BC era. At the time Multan was part of Gandharan civilization.

=== Greek Invasion (327-325 BC) ===
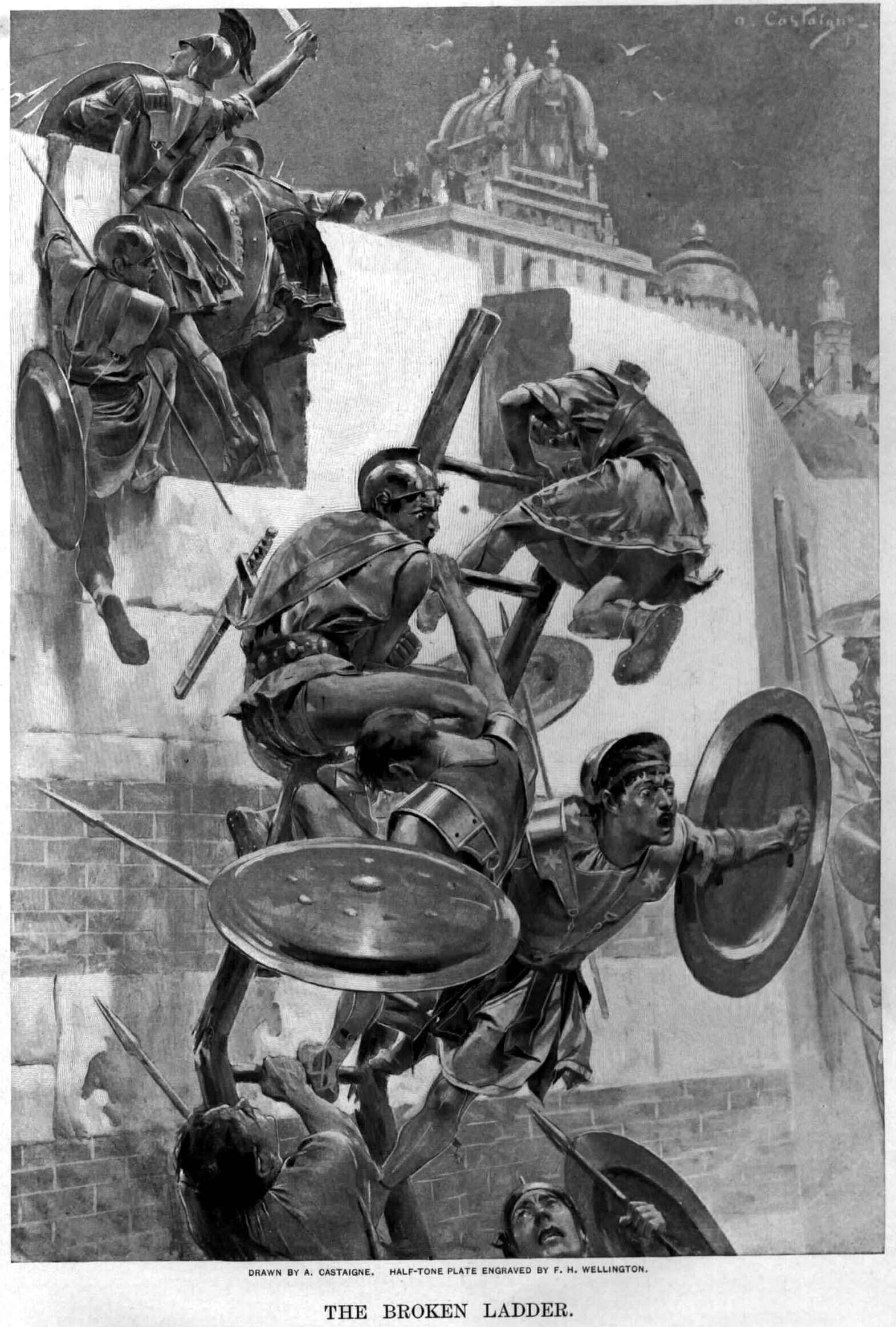
Siege of Multan by Alexander the Great. André Castaigne (1898- 1899).

Multan was ruled by various native empires before the invasion of Alexander the Great. It is said by some historians that when Alexander was fighting for the city, a poisoned arrow struck injuring him fatally and eventually leading to his death. The exact place where Alexander was hit by the arrow can be seen in the old city premises. The noted Chinese traveller Huen Tsang visited Multan in 641.

=== Under Sindh's Dynasties(489-712 AD) ===
Multan later remained under control of Rai dynasty and Brahman Dynasty of Sindh.

== Medieval era ==
In the 7th century, Multan had its first arrival of the Muslim armies. Armies led by Al Muhallab ibn Abi Suffrah launched numerous raids from Persia into India in 664 for inclusion of the area into their empires.

=== Arab Sindh (711-815AD) ===
However, only a few decades later, Muhammad bin Qasim would come on behalf of the Arabs, and take Multan region along with Sindh. His conquest was accompanied by much plundering. Umayyads inhabited Arabs in Multan who then ruled large parts of Punjab and also included Kashmir. The descendents of these Arabs are still found in various parts of Pakistan and India. Islam strengthened in the region reaching towards emerging cities of Delhi and Lahore.

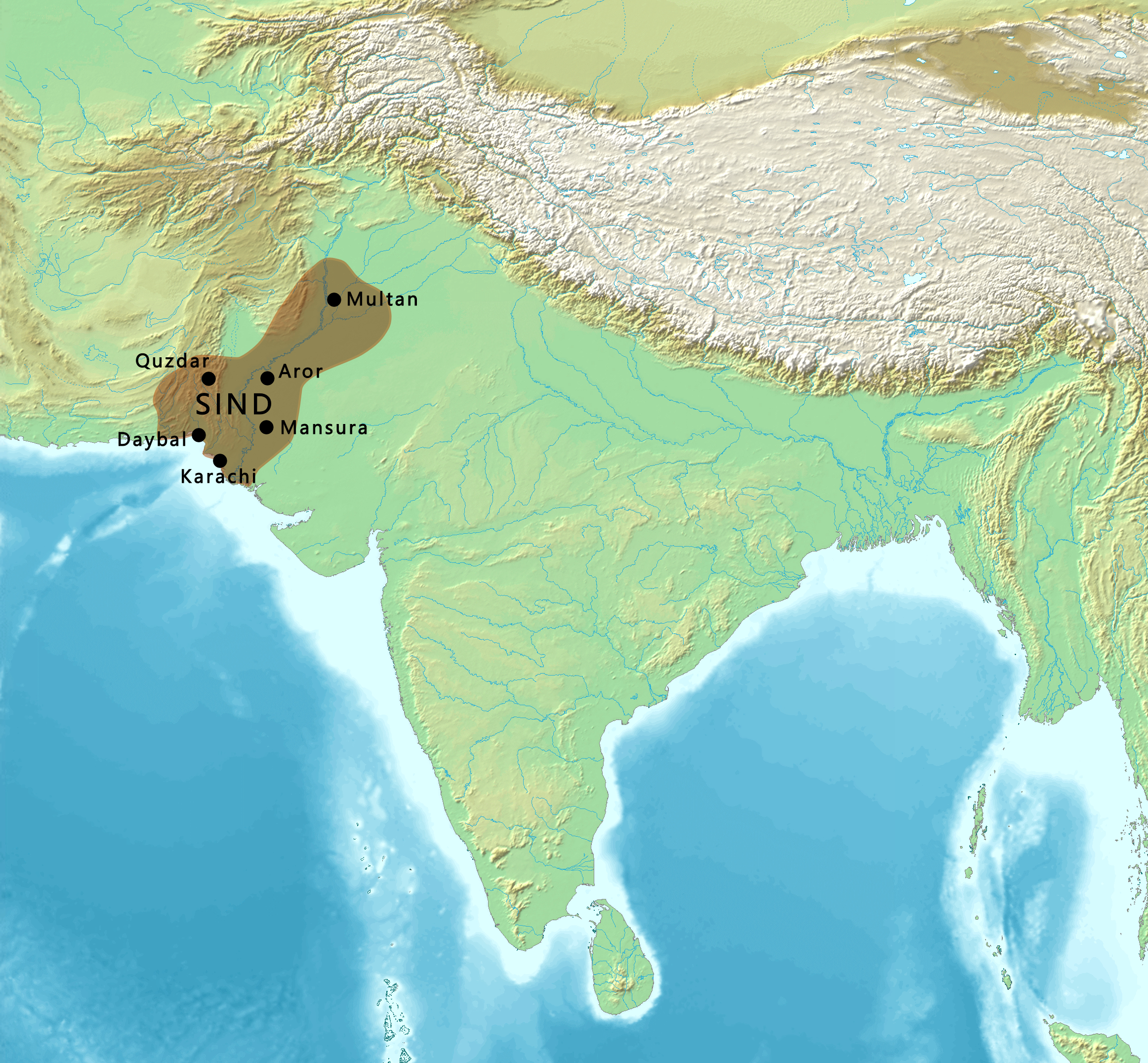
Map of the Caliphal province of Sind, a province of the Abbasid Caliphate, circa 800 CE.

He then crossed the Biyas, and went towards Multan. Muhammad Bin Qasim destroyed the water-course; upon which the inhabitants, oppressed with thirst, surrendered at discretion. He massacred the men capable of bearing arms, but the children were taken captive, as well as ministers of the temple, to the number of 6,000. The Muslims found there much gold in a chamber ten cubits long by eight broad.

After Islamic Conquest

After the conquest of Multan one had pointed out Muhammad bin Qasim about treasure hidden beneath the fountain which was buried by Raja Jesubin. Muhammad bin Qasim found 330 chests of treasure containing 13,300 Maunds gold. Entire treasure was shifted from Debal to Basra on ships. Al Beruni also visited the city during Mahmud Ghaznavi's rule". Following bin Qasim's conquest, the city was securely under Muslim rule, although it was in effect an independent state, but around the start of the 11th century, the city was attacked twice by Mahmud of Ghazni who destroyed the Sun Temple and broke its giant Idol. A graphic detail is available in Al-Biruni's writings:

A famous idol of theirs was that of Multan, dedicated to the sun, and therefore called Aditya. It was of wood and covered with red Cordovan leather; in its two eyes were two red rubies. It is said to have been made in the last Kritayuga. When Muhammad Ibn Alkasim Ibn Almunaibh conquered Multan, he inquired how the town had become so very flourishing and so many treasures had there been accumulated, and then he found out that this idol was the cause, for there came pilgrims from all sides to visit it. Therefore, he thought it best to have the idol where it was, but he hung a piece of cow's flesh on its neck by way of mockery. On the same place a mosque was built. When the Karmatians occupied Multan, Jalam Ibn Shaiban, the usurper, broke the idol into pieces and killed its priests.

=== Abbasid Amirate (855-959 AD) ===
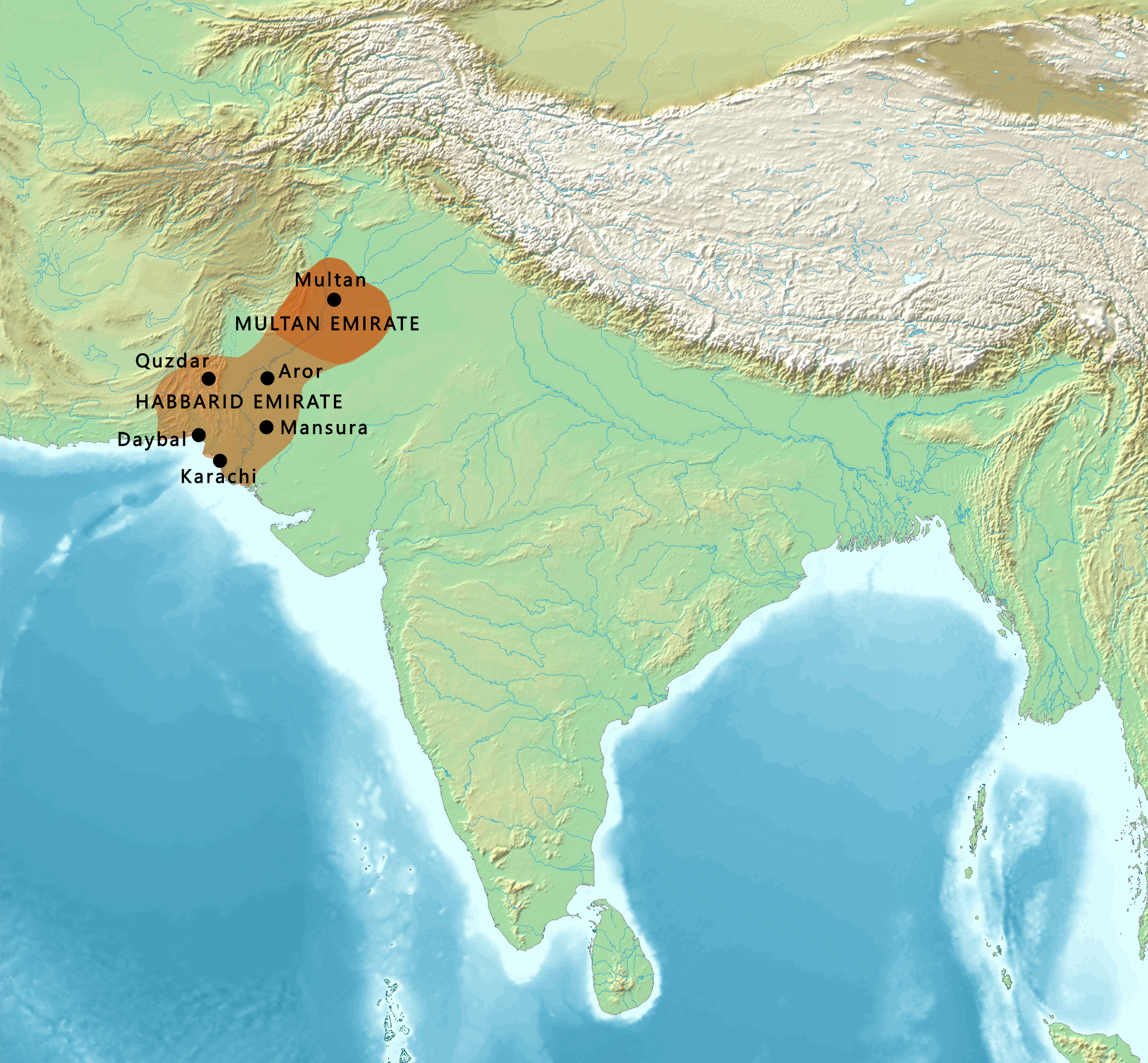
Map of the Habbarid Emirate and the Multan Emirate, which replaced the Caliphal province of Sind circa 854 CE.

By the mid-800s, the Banu Munabbih (also known as the Banu Sama), who claimed descent from the Prophet Muhammad's Quraysh tribe came to rule Multan, and established the Emirate of Banu Munabbih, which ruled for the next century.

During this era, the Multan Sun Temple was noted by the 10th century Arab geographer Al-Muqaddasi to have been located in a most populous part of the city. The Hindu temple was noted to have accrued the Muslim rulers large tax revenues, by some accounts up to 30% of the state's revenues. During this time, the city's Arabic nickname was Faraj Bayt al-Dhahab, ("Frontier House of Gold"), reflecting the importance of the temple to the city's economy.

The 10th century Arab historian Al-Masudi noted Multan as the city where Central Asian caravans from Islamic Khorasan would assemble. The 10th century Persian geographer Estakhri noted that the city of Multan was approximately half the size of Sindh's capital Mansura, but the region of Multan was widespread, Mansura along with Multan were the only two Arab principalities in South Asia. Arabic was spoken in both cities, though the inhabitants of Multan were reported by Estakhri to also have been speakers of Persian, reflecting the importance of trade with Khorasan. Polyglossia rendered Multani merchants culturally well-suited for trade with the Islamic world.

The 10th century Hudud al-'Alam notes that Multan's rulers also controlled Lahore, though that city was then lost to the Hindu Shahi Empire. During the 10th century, Multan's rulers resided at a camp outside of the city named Jandrawār, and would enter Multan once a week on the back of an elephant for Friday prayers.

=== Ismaili Emirate of Multan (959-1010 AD) ===
By the mid 10th century, Multan had come under the influence of the Qarmatians. The Qarmatians had been expelled from Egypt and Iraq following their defeat at the hands of the Abbasids there. Qarmatians zealots had famously sacked Mecca, and outraged the Muslim world with their theft and ransom of the Kaaba's Black Stone, and desecration of the Zamzam Well with corpses during the Hajj season of 930 CE. They wrested control of the city from the pro-Abbasid Amirate of Banu Munabbih, and established the Emirate of Multan, thereby ruling large parts of Punjab and Kashmir including within its limits modern day capital of Pakistan Islamabad, and pledged allegiance to the Fatimid Dynasty based in Cairo.

Jalam bin Shayban, a proselytizing Da'i that had been dispatched to the region by the Fatimid Caliph Imam al-Mu'izz, was dispatched to replace the city's previous Da'i who had been accused of promoting a syncretic version of Islam that incorporated Hindu rites – though his replacement was likely the result of doctrinal differences regarding succession in the Ismaili Imamate.

Jalam bin Shayban, established newly converted Katara Rajputs as its rulers. During his era, Multan became a prosperous city, as witness by famous geographer and travelled Al-Al-Muqadassi in 985;

The people of Multan are Shi'a...... In Multan the Khutba is read in the name of the Fatimid Caliph of Egypt and the place is administered by his orders. Gifts are regularly sent from here to Egypt".

Multan is smaller than Mansurah in size. but has a large population. Fruits are not found in plenty.. yet they are sold cheaper.... like Siraf, Multan has wooden homes. There is no bad conduct and drunkenness here, and people convicted of these crimes are punished with death or by some heavy sentence. Business is fair and honest. Travellers are looked after well. . Most of the inhabitants are Arabs. They live by a river. The place in abounds vegetation and wealth. Trade flourishes here. Good manners and good living are noticed everywhere. The Government is just. Women of the town are modestly dressed with no make-up and hardly found talking to any one in the streets. The water is healthy and the standard of living high. There is happiness, well-being and culture here, Persian is understood. Profits of business are high. People are healthy, but the town is not clean. Houses are small. The climate is warm and arid. The people are of darkish complexion. In Multan, the coin is minted on the style of the Fatimid Egyptian coin, but the Qanhari coins are commonly used.

Ghaznavid Conquest

Soon after, Multan was attacked by the Ghaznavids, destabilizing the Ismaili state. Mahmud of Ghazna invaded Multan in 1005, conducting a series of campaigns. The city was surrendered, and Abdul Fateh Daud was permitted to retain control over the city with some conditions. Mahmud appointed a Hindu-convert, Nawasa Khan, to rule the region in Mahmud's absentia. After being granted power, Niwasa Khan renounced Islam, and attempted to secure control of the region in collusion with Abdul Fateh Daud.

Mahmud of Ghazni then led another expedition to Multan in 1007 C.E. against Niwasa Khan, who was then captured and forced to relinquish his personal fortune to Ghazni.

In an effort to gain his allegiance, the Fatimid Ismaili Imam-caliph al-Hakim dispatched an envoy to Sultan Mahmud Ghaznavi two years later. This attempt appeared to be unsuccessful and the Ghaznawids continued to attack other Ismaili strongholds in Sindh to suppress any resurgence of the community in the region. In 1032, Mahmud's very own vizier, Hasanak was executed for having accepted a cloak from the Imam-caliph on suspicions that he had become an adherent of the Ismaili fiqh.

Mahmud's purges of the region led several scholars including Stern to believe that the Ghaznawid purges of the region drove out Ismailism from the area, however, recently discovered letters dating to 1083 and 1088 demonstrate continued Ismaili activity in the region, as the Imam-caliph Mustansir dispatched new da’is to replace those who were killed in the attacks. Ismaili rulers of this era are as follows:

- Jalam B.Shayban (959–985), founded the emirate of Multan
- Shaykh Hamid (985–997), The Ghaznawid Amir Sabuktagin invaded Multan in 381/991 during his era, but later made a truce with Shaykh Hamid, as Isma'ili Multan served as a buffer-state between the rising Turkish power of Ghazna and the old Hindu rulers-the Imperial Pratiharas of Kanauj.
- Abu'l-Futuh Da'ud b. Nasr (997–1010), he was the grandson of Shaykh Hamid. In 1010, the Ghaznawid finally annexed Multan, took Abu'l-Fateh as prisoner. Abul Fateh died in a prison in Ghazna, and the emirate was abolished.

=== Conquest of Muhammad Ghori ===
Like his predecessor, Mahmud of Ghazni, Muhammad of Ghor first took, in 1178, the Ismaili Multan sultans in northern Sindh, which had regained independence from Ghaznavid rule. Muhammad Ghori as a part of his campaigns to conquer north India, again massacred them.

After Sultan Muhammad Ghori's victories in India, and his establishment of a capital in Delhi, Multan was made a part of his empire. However, the rise of the Mongols would again give it some independence, albeit requiring it to be vigilant against Mongol raids from Central Asia.

The Qarmatians came to Multan in the 10th century and were expelled in 1175 by Sultan Muhammad Ghori

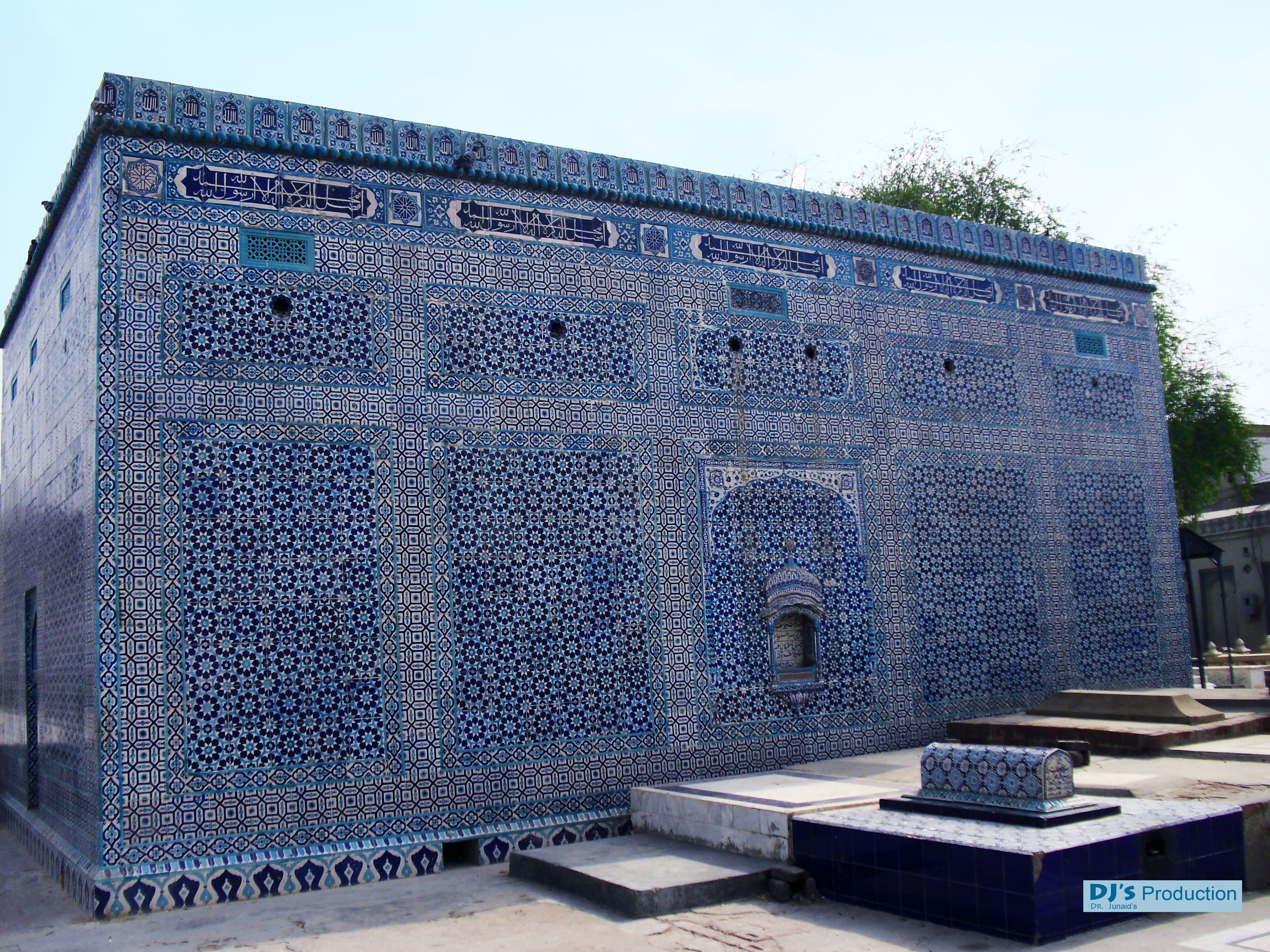
Multan is famous for its large number of Sufi shrines, including the unique rectangular tomb of Shah Gardez that dates from the 1150s and is covered in blue enameled tiles typical of Multan.

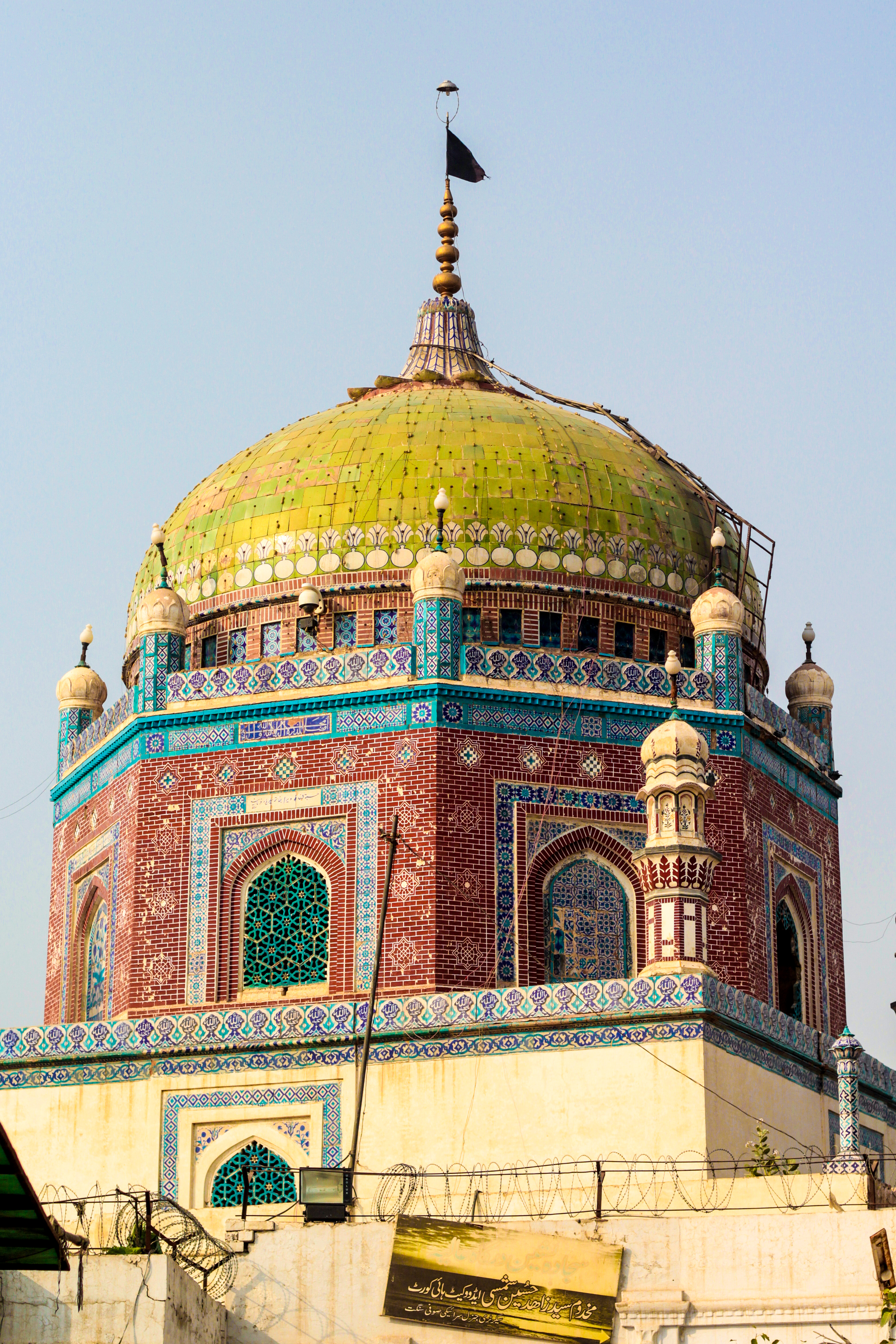
The shrine of Shamsuddin Sabzwari dates from 1330, and has a unique green dome.

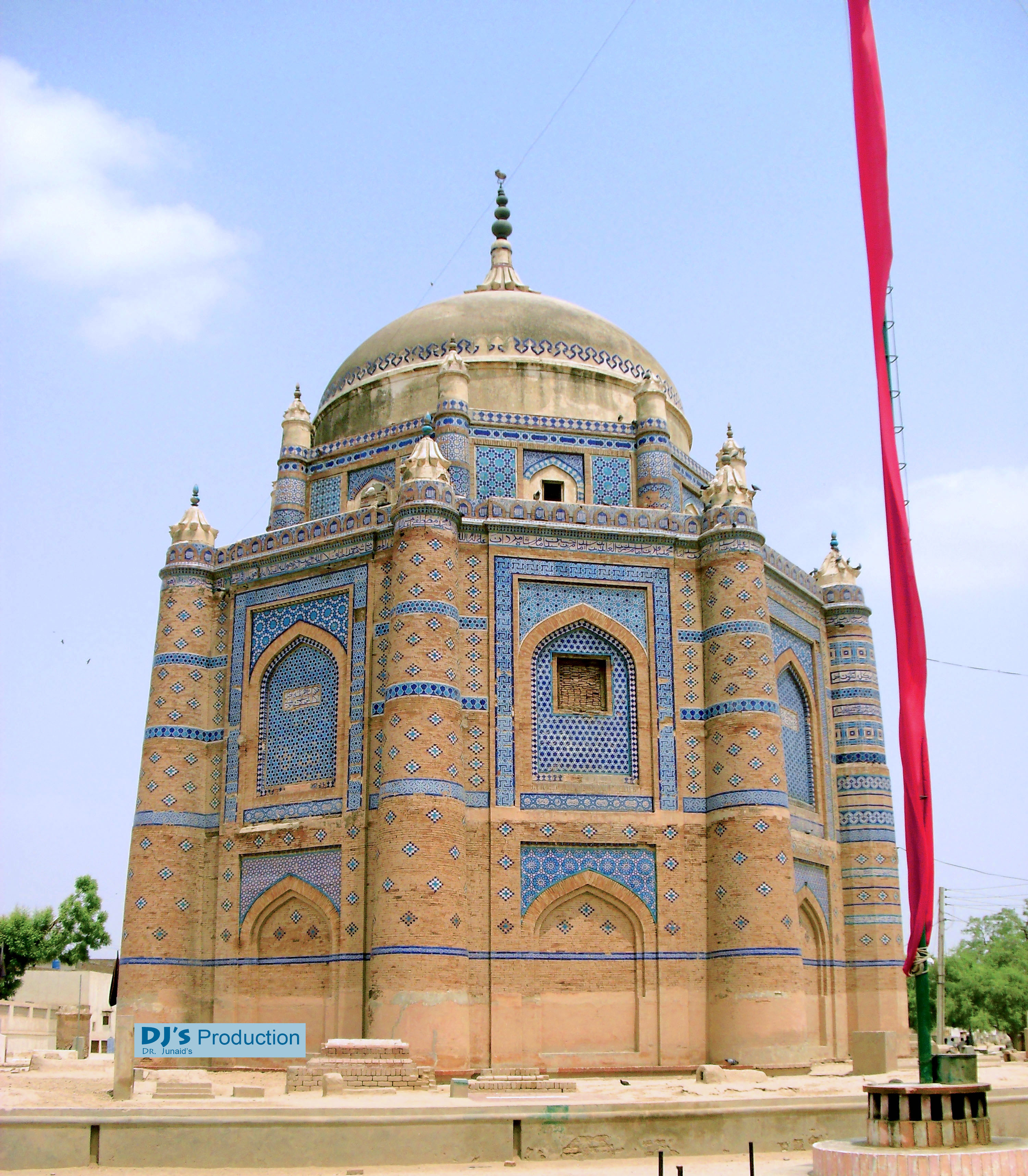
The Mausoleum of Shah Ali Akbar dating from the 1580s was built in the regional style that is typical of Multan's shrines.

=== Independent kingdom (1203–1228) ===
Following the death of Sultan Muhammad Ghauri, Multan came under the rule of Nasiruddin Qabacha, who in 1222, successfully repulsed an attempted invasion by Sultan Jalal al-Din Mangburni of the Khwarazmian Empire, whose origins were rooted in modern-day Turkmenistan. Qabacha also repulsed a 40-day siege imposed on the city by Mongol forces who attempted to conquer the city. Following Qabacha's death that same year, the Turkic king Iltutmish, the third Sultan of the Mamluk dynasty, captured and then annexed Multan in an expedition. The Punjabi poet Baba Farid was born in the village of Khatwal near Multan in the 1200s.

=== Mamluk era ===
Qarlughids attempted to invade Multan in 1236, while the Mongols tried to capture the city in 1241 after capturing Lahore. Nasir Ud din Qabacha gathered a large army from Uch, Multan and Sindh and the Mongols were repulsed. The Mongols under Sali Noyan then successfully held the city to ransom in 1245–6, before being recaptured by Sultan Ghiyas ud din Balban, the ninth Mamluk Sultan. Multan then fell to the Qarlughids in 1249, but was captured by Sher Khan that same year. Multan was then conquered by Izz al-Din Balban Kashlu Khan in 1254, before he rebelled against Sultan Ghiyas ud din Balban in 1257 and fled to Iraq where he joined Mongol forces and captured Multan again, and dismantled its city walls. The Mongols again attempted an invasion in 1279, but were dealt a decisive defeat. Alauddin Khalji of Delhi dispatched his brother Ulugh Khan in 1296 to conquer Multan in order to eliminate surviving family members of his predecessor.

=== Tughluq ===
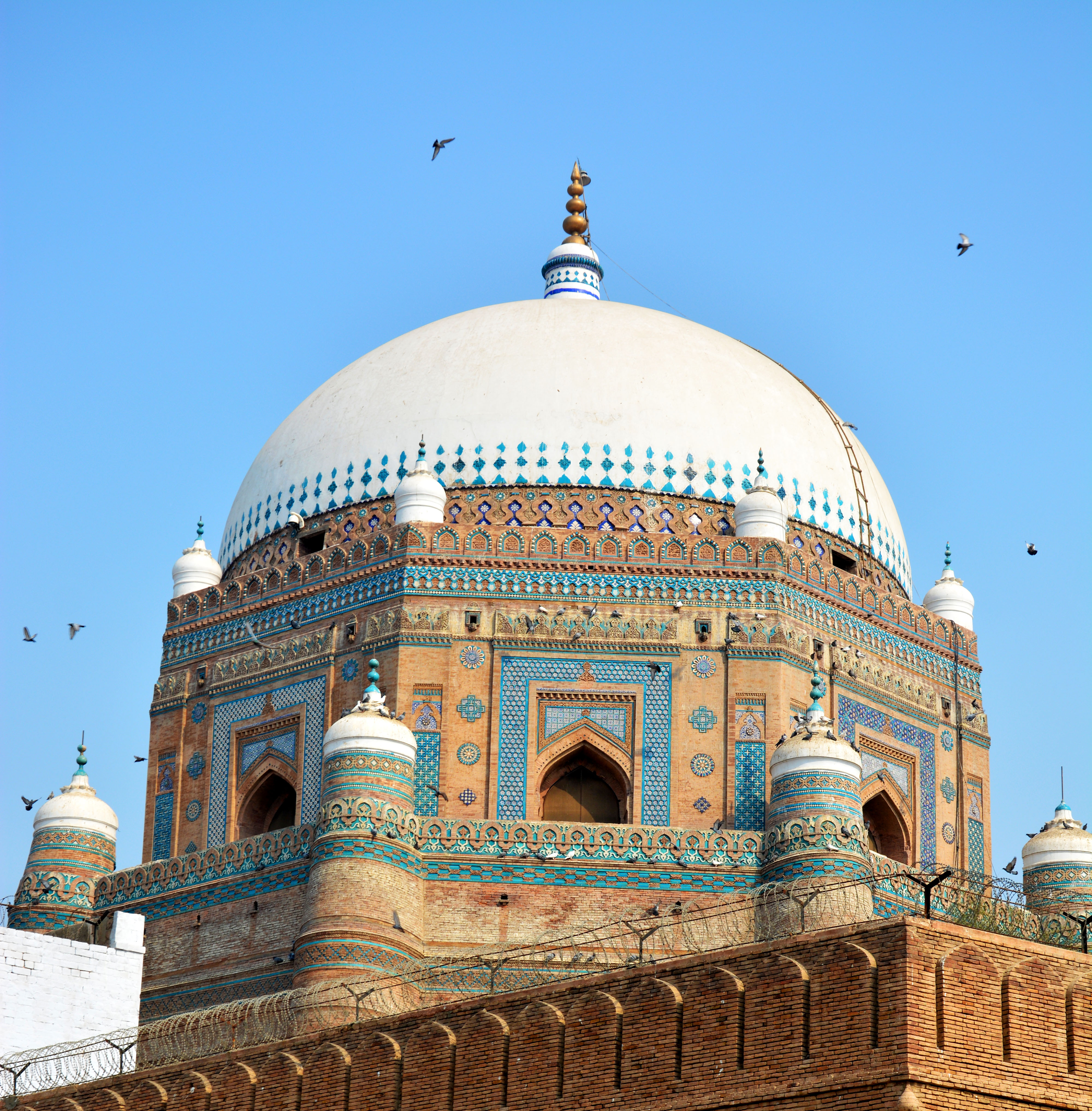
Multan's Tomb of Shah Rukn-e-Alam is considered to be the earliest Tughluq-era monument.

In the 1320s Multan was conquered by Ghiyath al-Din Tughluq, founder of the Turkic Tughluq dynasty, the third dynasty of the Delhi Sultanate. The countryside around Multan was recorded to have been devastated by excessively high taxes imposed during the reign of Ghiyath's son, Muhammad Tughluq. In 1328, the Governor of Multan, Kishlu Khan, rose in rebellion against Muhammad Tughluq, but was quickly defeated. The Tomb of Shah Rukn-e-Alam was completed during the Tughluq era, and is considered to be the first Tughluq monument. The shrine is believed to have been originally built to be the tomb of Ghiyath ad-Din, but was later donated to the descendants of Rukn-e-Alam after Ghiyath became Emperor of Delhi.

The renowned Arab explorer Ibn Battuta visited Multan in the 1300s during the reign of Muhammad Tughluq, and noted that Multan was a trading centre for horses imported from as far away as the Russian Steppe. Multan had also been noted to be a centre for slave-trade, though slavery was banned in the late 1300s by Muhammad Tughluq's son, Firuz Shah Tughlaq.

=== Timurid ===
In 1397, Multan was besieged by Tamerlane's grandson Pir Muhammad. Pir Muhammad's forces captured the city in 1398 following the conclusion of the 6 month-long siege. Also in 1398, the elder Tamerlane and Multan's Governor Khizr Khan together sacked Delhi. The sack of Delhi lead to major disruptions of the Sultanate's central governing structure. In 1414, Multan's Khizr Khan captured Delhi from Daulat Khan Lodi, and established the short-lived Sayyid dynasty — the fourth dynasty of the Delhi Sultanate.

=== Langah Sultanate (1445-1540) ===
Multan then passed to the Langah, who established the Langah Sultanate in Multan under the rule of Budhan Khan, who assumed the title Mahmud Shah. The reign of Shah Husayn, grandson of Mahmud Shah, who ruled from 1469 to 1498 is considered to most illustrious of the Langah Sultans. Multan experienced prosperity during this time, and a large number of Baloch settlers arrived in the city at the invitation of Shah Husayn. The Sultanate's borders stretched encompassed the neighbouring regions surrounding the cities of Chiniot and Shorkot. Shah Husayn successfully repulsed attempted invasion by the Delhi Sultans led by Tatar Khan and Barbak Shah, as well as his daughter Zeerak Rumman.

Multan's Langah Sultanate came to an end in 1525 when the city was invaded by rulers of the Arghun dynasty, who were either ethnic Mongols, or of Turkic or Turco-Mongol extraction.

=== Suri ===
In 1541, the Pashtun king Sher Shah Suri captured Multan, and successfully defended the city from the advances of the Mughal Emperor Humayun. In 1543, Sher Shah Suri expelled Baloch dynasty, who under the command of Fateh Khan Mirrani had overrun the city. Following its recapture, Sher Shah Suri ordered construction of a road between Lahore and Multan in order to connect Multan to his massive Grand Trunk Road project. Multan then served as the starting point for trade caravans from medieval India departing towards West Asia.

=== Medieval trade ===
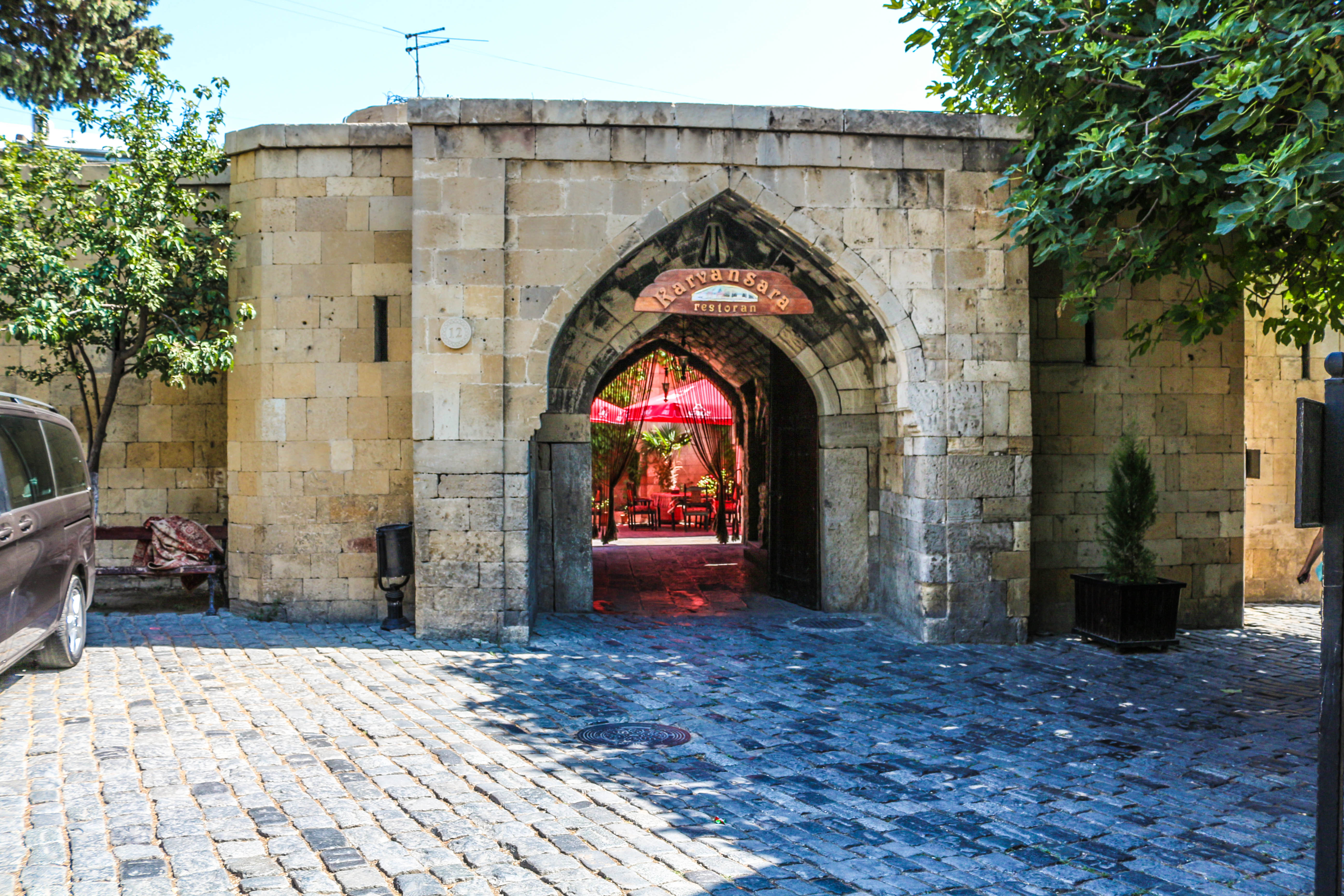
The 15th century Multani caravanserai in Baku, Azerbaijan, was built to house visiting Multani merchants in the city.

Multan served as medieval Islamic India's trans-regional mercantile centre for trade with the Islamic world. It rose as an important trading and mercantile centre in the setting of political stability offered by the Delhi Sultanate, the Lodis, and Mughals. The renowned Arab explorer Ibn Battuta visited Multan in the 1300s during the reign of Muhammad Tughluq, and noted that Multan was a trading centre for horses imported from as far away as the Russian Steppe. Multan had also been noted to be a centre for slave-trade, though slavery was banned in the late 1300s by Muhammad Tughluq's son, Firuz Shah Tughlaq.

The extent of Multan's influence is also reflected in the construction of the Multani caravanserai in Baku, Azerbaijan — which was built in the 15th to house Multani merchants visiting the city. Legal records from the Uzbek city of Bukhara note that Multani merchants settled and owned land in the city in the late 1550s.

Multan would remain an important trading centre until the city was ravaged by repeated invasions in the 18th and 19th centuries in the post-Mughal era. Many of Multan's merchants then migrated to Shikarpur in Sindh, and were found throughout Central Asia up until the 19th century.

== Early Modern Era ==
=== Mughal era ===
The Mughals controlled the Multani region from 1524 until around 1739. Badshah (emperor) Akbar established at Multan one of his original twelve subahs (imperial top-level provinces) roughly covering Punjab, bordering Kabul, Lahore, (Old) Delhi, Ajmer, Thatta subahs, the Persian Safavid empire and shortly Qandahar subah.

Under the Mughal Empire, Multan enjoyed over 200 years of peace, and became known as Dar al-Aman (Abode of Peace). The Khakwani Nawabs of Multan gave it a lot of financial stability and growth to the local farming sector. It was at this time that Multan was ruled by Nawab Ali Mohammad Khan Khakwani. As governor of Multan, he built the famous Mosque Ali Mohammad Khan in 1757 which remains to this day. Many buildings were constructed in that time, and agricultural production grew rapidly. The Khakwani Nawabs of Multan at that time were paying homage to the Afghan king but due to lack of power in Delhi and Kabul they had free rein and were the de facto absolute rulers of Multan.

Multan region at that time included areas which are part of Sahiwal, Dera ismail khan, Jhang and Dera Ghazi Khan. The city escaped the destruction brought upon India by the armies of Nadir Shah. Afterwards it was ruled from Kabul by numerous Afghan dynasties for a while, including Ahmed Shah Durrani, who, in 1750, appointed a Hindu Subahdar Malik Banwari Lal to administer Multan (and later nearby Shujabaad and Pak Pattan areas). For the majority of its medieval history, the Delhi Sultanate and later Mughal Empire ruled the region. Multan region became predominantly Muslim due to missionary Sufi saints whose dargahs dot the landscape of Multan region. After the decline of the Mughal Empire, the Maratha and Sikh invaded and occupied Multan.

=== Post-Mughal ===
Nader Shah conquered the region as part of his invasion of the Mughal Empire in 1739. Despite invasion, Multan remained northwest India's premier commercial centre throughout most of the 18th century.

In 1752 Ahmad Shah Durrani captured Multan, and the city's walls were rebuilt in 1756 by Nawab Ali Mohammad Khan Khakwani, who also built the Ali Muhammad Khan Mosque in 1757. In 1758, the Marathas under Raghunathrao briefly seized Multan, though the city was recaptured by Durrani in 1760. After repeated invasions following the collapse of the Mughal Empire, Multan was reduced from being one of the world's most important early-modern commercial centres, to a regional trading city.

=== Maratha Empire ===
In 1758, the Maratha Empire's general Raghunathrao marched onwards, conquered Lahore and Attock and defeated Timur Shah Durrani, the son and viceroy of Ahmad Shah Abdali. Lahore, Multan, Kashmir and other subahs on the eastern side of Attock were under the Maratha rule for the most part. In Lahore and Kashmir, the Marathas plundered the prosperous Mughal cities. Maratha general Bapuji Trimbak was given the charge of guarding Multan subah from Afghans. Maratha rule in Multan was short-lived as Durrani recaptured the city in November 1759.

=== Sikh era ===
After Ahmad Shah Durrani's dynasty went into decline, it was ruled locally by the Pashtun Khakwani and Saddozai chieftains. The Sadozais having gained the favour of the king and having the Khakwani Nawab removed. This period saw the rise of Sikh power, who attacked Multan, killing the Sadozai Nawab, took over the city. The Khakwanis had moved out of the city at that time and lived in small walled cities around main Multan city.

The Khokhars and Khatri Muslims occupied Multan intermittently between 1756 and 1763 displacing replacing ruling Sadozai member by Khakwani nawab or his brother, son or even son-in-law, this was most turbulent period in history of Multan resulting administration getting paralyzed and inviting attack from Bhangi Misl from Gujranwala.

Jhanda Singh Dhillon and Ganda Singh Dhillon two brothers and great warriors attacked again in 1764. However, attempts to take the Multan fort failed and they retreated after collecting several million rupees loot from the ruler Shuja Khan Saddozai. Bhangu Sikhs attacked Multan many times and finally captured the city by defeating Shuja Khan Sadozai who was the governor of Multan on 22 Dec 1772. Shuja Khan fled to Shujabad and died there. Afghans recaptured the city in 1780 and rule of Bhangi Sikhs ended.

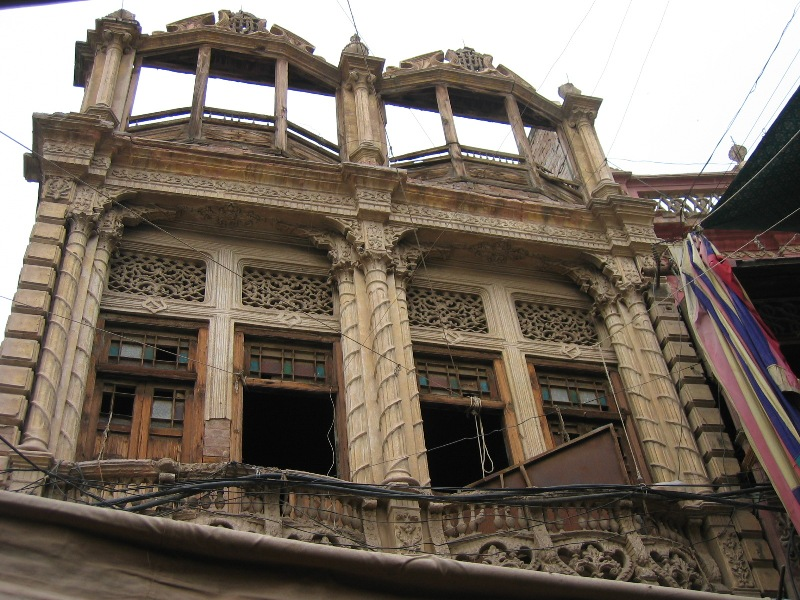
The front view of an old colonial building built during the rule of the British Raj.

In the 19th century, the Sikh ruler Maharaja Ranjit Singh with his capital at Lahore occupied Multan. Sikh armies under General Hari Singh Nalwa defeated the ruler of Multan, Muzaffar Khan Saddozai. The death of Muzaffar Khan was in fact the death of Muslim rule in Multan. Ranjit Singh reinstated Malik Mohanlal (Vijh), a descendant of Malik Banwari Lal (Vijh) who was Subahdar of Multan during Ahmed Shah Durrani's rule, as Subahdar, and appointed his younger brother Malik Sewa Ram as a Vakil in Lahore. He also appointed Diwan Sawan Mal Chopra, who was Malik Mohanlal's Munshi or accountant, as the Diwan of Multan.

== Modern era ==
=== British era ===
Siege of Multan by British Army

The Siege of Multan began on 19 April 1848 when local Sikhs murdered two emissaries of the British Raj who were present at the reception of the new governor of Multan who had been selected by the British East India Company. Rebellion engulfed the Multan region under the leadership of Diwan Mulraj Chopra. The British soon launched expeditions against Mulraj, capturing the nearby town of Dera Ghazi Khan. The British then defeated Mulraj's forces at a settlement 4 miles away from Multan on 1 July 1848, and captured most guns belonging to Mulraj's army.

General William Whish was ordered in July 1848 to take 7,000 men with him into order to capture Multan, where Mulraj had been encircled. Much of the force was of Sikhs, who in October 1848 defected to Mulraj's forces, forcing General Whish to abandon his first attempt to conquer Multan. By December 1848, the British had captured portions of Multan city's outskirts. In January 1849, the British had amassed a force of 12,000 to conquer Multan. On 22 January 1849, the British had breached the walls of the Multan Fort, leading to the surrender of Mulraj and his forces.

After a long and bloody battle, Multan was made part of the British Raj. During this time, Sardar Karan Narain's son became an icon during the British Raj and was awarded titles 'Rai Bahadur' and Knighted 'Sir' by Her Majesty. The British built some rail routes to the city, but its industrial capacity was never fully developed.

=== Post-independence ===
The predominantly Muslim population supported Muslim League and Pakistan Movement. After the independence of Pakistan in 1947, the minority Hindus and Sikhs migrated to India while the Muslim refugees from India settled in the Multan. It initially lacked industry, hospitals and universities. Since then, there has been some industrial growth, and the city's population is continually growing. Today, it is one of the country's largest urban centres and remains an important settlement in the Pakistan.

== See also ==
- Dewan Mulraj
- Fateh Daud
