= Kharboni =

Subtribe of Pashtuns

The Kharboni (Pashto: کاربوني) are one of the three major sub-tribes of the Khogyani tribe of Karlan Pashtun. The Kharboni are primarily found in the central regions of Nangarhar Province, Afghanistan, particularly Khogyani District.
