= Muzaffar Khan Sadozai =

Durrani governor of Multan (1780–1818)

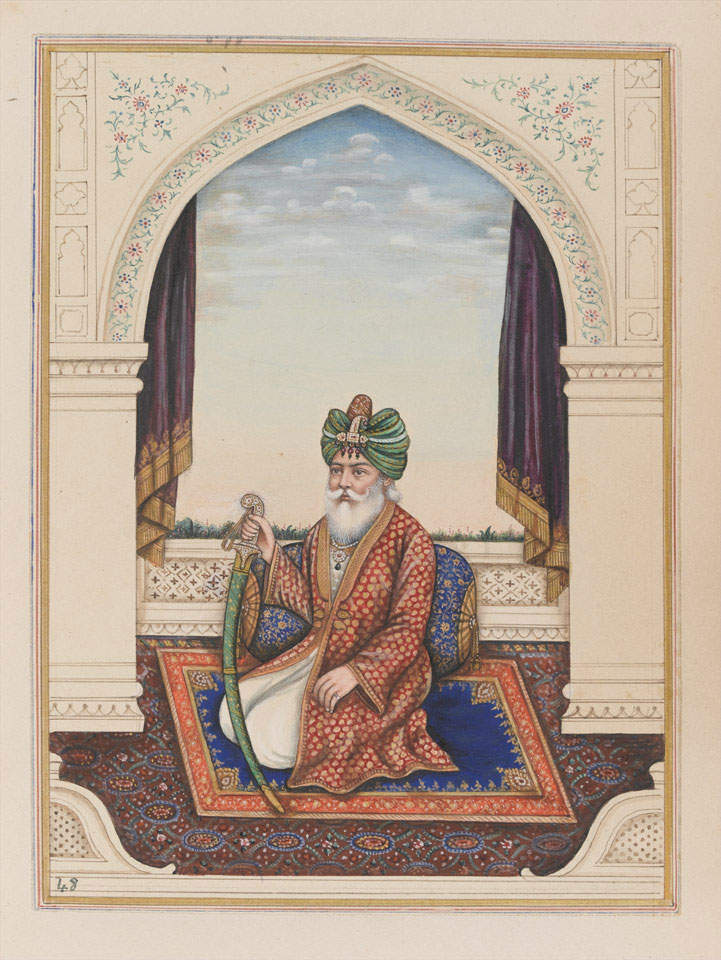
- Company painting of Muzaffar Khan Sadozai, the last Afghan ruler of Multan, c. 1865

Durrani governor of Multan
- In office 1780–1818
- Monarchs: Timur Shah Durrani; Zaman Shah Durrani; Mahmud Shah Durrani; Shuja Shah Durrani
- Preceded by: Diwan Singh Chachowalia (as Bhangi governor)
- Succeeded by: Sukh Dayal Khatri (as Sikh governor); Sawan Mal Chopra (first permanent Sikh governor, appointed 1820)

Personal details
- Born: 1757
- Died: 2 June 1818 (aged 60–61) Multan Fort
- Parent: Shuja Khan (father)

Muzaffar Khan Sadozai (1757 – 2 June 1818) was the Saddozai Pashtun ruler of Multan from 1780 to 1818, initially as a governor for the Afghan Durrani dynasty of Kabul (1780 – 1809), and later as a vassal of Ranjit Singh (1802 – 1818). He declared independence from the Durrani Empire after the fall of Shuja Shah Durrani in 1809, but was killed fighting against the Sikh army during the siege of Multan in 1818.

== Early life ==
Muzaffar Khan Sadozai, born in Multan in 1757, was the eldest son of Shuja Khan, the governor of Multan between 1767 and 1772. He was well educated in religion, civil administration and warfare. He was only 18 years old when his father instructed him to lead a mission to Kabul in January 1775, to seek help against the Sikhs who had conquered Multan in 1772 and had been besieging Shujabad. His mission failed but he got the attention of the Afghan King who fixed 5,000 rupees as his stipend. He commanded with bravery the Afghan contingent during the siege of Multan in February 1775. When Ganda Singh invaded Shujabad, he defended city with great valour. He succeeded his father at the age of 18 in Shujabad in 1776. Muzaffar Khan could not capture Multan until 1780, when he was reinstated by Timur Shah Durrani, the King of Kabul, who expelled the Sikh governor Diwan Singh Chachowalia and appointed Muzaffar Khan as the Governor (Subedar) of Multan. Timur Shah Durrani also gave him the title of Nawab, at the age of 23.

== Tenure ==
In 1817, Maharaja Ranjit Singh sent his army to Multan. The commander of army was Diwan Bhiwani Das. Main purpose of this invasion was to ask Muzaffar Khan Sadozai to accept the rule of Sikh Darbar. In 1818, Kharak Singh and Hindu Commander Misr Diwan Chand arms troops lay around Multan without making much initial headway. Maharaja Ranjit Singh sent a large cannon named Zamzama. Though in name, the army was commanded by Kharak Singh but actual command was in the hand of Military genius Misr Diwan Chand. The Maharaja directed his son to pay full attention to the advice of Misr Diwan Chand

Muzaffar urged the majority of the Muslim population of the city of Multan to fight a war against the Sikhs and Hindus. However, the tactics of Muzaffar Khan failed as the Sikh armies were able to suppress the revolt of the Multan population. In the battle, Misr Diwan Chand led the Sikh armies to victory over Muzaffar Khan. Muzzafar Khan and seven of his sons were killed before the Multan Fort finally fell on June 2, 1818.

== Places named after Muzaffar Khan Sadozai ==
- Muzaffargarh
- Muzaffarabad, Multan

== See also ==
- List of Pashtun empires and dynasties
- Sadozai Sultanate of Herat
- Ahmad Shah Durrani
