= Khakwani =

Caste in Punjab, Pakistan

Khakwani (Urdu: خاکوانی) is a caste among Multani Pathans present in the Multan and Bahawalnagar districts in southern Punjab, Pakistan.

Khakwanis trace their descent from the Pashtun Khogiyani tribe, which originated from the Khogyani District in the present-day Afghanistan, and migrated to Multan during the Durrani period in the 18th-century. Their most notable member, Ali Mohammad Khan, was the governor of Multan for Ahmed Shah Abdali between 1751 and 1764. Khakwanis have largely assimilated into the local population and are Siraiki-speaking. They have had large landholdings in the Kabirwala, Vehari and Mailsi tehsils, and have been politically prominent in the region.

== Notable people with the surname ==
- Nasiruddin Khakwani
- Ishaq Khan Khakwani
- Muhammad Ali Raza Khakwani
- Ali Mohammad Khan Khakwani
