= Prahladpuri Temple =

Destroyed Hindu temple in Multan, Pakistan

Prahladpuri Temple پرَہْلادْپُورِی مندر
- Ruins of Prahladpuri Temple

- Location within Punjab, Pakistan Location within Pakistan Location within Asia

Religion
- Affiliation: Hinduism
- District: Multan
- Deity: Narasimha
- Festival: Holi
- Governing body: Evacuee Trust Property Board

Location
- Location: Multan
- Country: Pakistan
- Coordinates: 30°12′01.3″N 71°28′36.6″E

Architecture
- Demolished: 1992

Prahladpuri Temple (Urdu: پرَہْلادْپُورِی مندر) was a Hindu temple located in Multan city of Punjab province in Pakistan. The temple was located on top of a raised platform (mandapa) at the southern tip of the Multan Fort, adjacent to the Shrine of Bahauddin Zakariya. Named after Prahlada, it was dedicated to the Hindu deity Narasimha. The temple faced neglect after the formation of Pakistan.

== Legend ==
According to local Hindu legend, Prahlada — son of Hiranyakashipu, the Asura king, built the temple in reverence to Narasimha, an incarnation of Vishnu. As narrated in Hindu tradition, Narasimha manifested from a stone pillar within the royal court to uphold Prahlada’s unwavering devotion and to destroy the tyrannical king, who had long persecuted his son for his faith. He appeared out of a pillar in the royal court to disembowel the oppressive king and reward Prahlada's devoutness. The temple is said to have been constructed around the pillar. Local folklore also attributed Holika Dahana commencing here.

== History ==
=== Pre-modern India ===
The temple stood on the ruins of pre-Islamic Hindu temple. There appear to have been older temples on the site which were subject to cycles of razing and re-construction during the medieval era; however, the precise details are hazy in light of conflicting legends.

Oral legends assert that a temple — with columns and roof made of gold — used to exist at the site c. 15th century before being dismantled by Sher Shah Suri to construct a mosque; the current temple was constructed when this mosque fell. (Note: Publications of the local archaeological department argue that since Jean de Thévenot mentions a temple "on this very site" during his visit in 1665, Suri's mosque must have been put to disuse within about a century of its construction, which is highly unlikely given its royal antecedents. Thus, the authenticity of the narrative is doubtful. However, Thévenot did not provide any such detail on the location; further, his description of the idol ran similar to that of the Multan Sun Temple by medieval Muslim travelogues.) Another account published in the Calcutta Review (1891) reproduces the same narrative except that the pre-existing temple had sunk of "unknown causes" and was not dismantled.

=== Colonial India ===
In 1810, the temple's height was raised — possibly as part of a reconstruction — which led to tensions with the local Muslim community. In 1831, Alexander Burnes described the temple as a low-height structure supported by wooden pillars, with Hanuman and Ganesha serving as the portal guardians; he was denied entry to what was "the only place of Hindu worship in Multan". An annual festival commemorating the appearance of Narasimha was held on the temple premises.

During the Siege of Multan in 1848, a shell fired by the forces of the East India Company struck a gunpowder store within the fort and blew off the temple's roof. Following the siege, the Company retained direct control of the fort and adjoining areas—including the temple and the mausoleum—for several years before restoring the shrines to their respective communities in July 1852. A month later, the Company prohibited access to the temple through the precincts of the mausoleum in lieu of permitting the Hindus to refurbish the temple. Visiting in 1854, Alexander Cunningham found the temple to be a roofless "square brick building with some very finely carved wooden pillars", and reiterated, incorrectly, (Note: Writing in 1891, Syad Muhammad Latif recorded several Hindu shrines in and around Multan, including the Totla Bai Mandir near the Haram Gate of the Multan Fort, believed to have been a shrine of considerable antiquity; the Jog Maya Mandir, situated about a mile from the city, which had received Sikh patronage under Ranjit Singh; and the Ram Tirtha Mandir at a similar distance from Multan, which had likewise received Ranjit Singh's patronage, among others. All of these shrines regularly hosted fairs and religious gatherings.) that it was the only Hindu shrine in Multan other than Suraj Kund.

In 1859, local Hindus and Muslims agreed to not make conspicuous additions to either the temple or the mausoleum. In 1861, the chief mahant of the temple, Baba Ram Das, raised about Rs.11,000 through public donations to refurbish the temple. In the early 1870s, his successor, Baba Narayan Das, proposed increasing the height of the temple spire to 13.7 metres—higher than that of the mausoleum—but was opposed by local Muslims who deemed it to violate the 1859 agreement, leading to an acrimonious dispute. (Note: For a rather graphic description, consult Boyle, Frederick (1884). "A Bit of an Old Story". On the Borderland. London: Chapman and Hall Limited. pp. 377–397.) Eventually, the local administration ruled in favor of the Muslims, and an agreement enacted on 14 April 1876 restricted the height of the spire to 10 metres. The Hindus, however, were dissatisfied with the outcome and sought to overturn it.

==== Multan riots and Hindu-Muslim conflict ====
In August 1880, the Mahant obtained consent from the local civil and military authorities to install the 45 ft. spire. Construction continued for about three months before the makhdoom of the mausoleum petitioned Cordery, the Commissioner of Multan, for an order halting the work. Upon investigation, Cordery reported the matter to Lt. Governor Egerton, who decided not only to reinstate the 1876 agreement but also to require the Hindus to cede possession of the compound well and an adjacent plot. The Hindus appealed to Viceroy Ripon, and around August 1881, a committee comprising six representatives each from the Hindu and Muslim community was constituted to arrive at a compromise. The committee proposed allowing the spire while, in compensation, granting the Muslims the sole possession of the well and ownership of the entire plot.

Before the proposal could be approved by the government and implemented, (Note: The Amrita Bazar Patrika of 11 August 1881 (p. 1) reports the Government to have informed the Hindus of Multan about their intentions to "shortly issue an order" on the dispute.) the town became enmeshed in the communal tensions spreading across Punjab against the backdrop of Arya Samaj's cow-protectionist movements. The transport and sale of beef in Multan town soon became an affair of competitive communalism. On 20 September 1881, a riot erupted and continued over two days, resulting in property damage estimated at 50,000 rupees but causing no casualties. Hindu rioters burned a mosque in the city's bazaar, attacked the Wali Muhammadi Mosque, and desecrated a Quran by setting it on fire; in retaliation, a Muslim mob set fire to the Prahladpuri temple. (Note: The entire contingent of British troops from Multan Cantonment had to be dispatched to control the riot.)

The temple, however, was quickly renovated by the Hindu community and a month later, on 14 October, the government issued its decision: the local authorities lacked jurisdiction to decide on the issue of additions to the temple structure, and the Hindus were therefore required either to dismantle the spire or to accept the compromise promised by the committee. A fortnight later, the Hindus chose the latter option. A new well for the Hindus was subsequently constructed in an adjacent plot, and a wall was erected between the mausoleum and the temple. Around this time, as increasing restrictions made access to the temple difficult for Hindu pilgrims, the image was relocated to Narasimha Mandir, a newly established shrine in the town.

==== Beyond riots ====
In the early hours of 7 November 1912, unidentified people removed an image of Lakshmi from the temple, stole its crown, and threw the image in a nearby well; Hindu devotees blamed local Muslims for the act. On 23 January 1913, a panchayat (trans. assembly) of Hindu devotees deposed the incumbent Mahant, leading to protracted litigation. (Note: This serves as an interesting example of the powers exerted by the community: the Mahant was dismissed on grounds of addiction to charas, refusal to shelter migrant fakirs, inappropriate conduct with women, and inability to maintain a record of temple donations. Ajudhia Das challenged the dismissal before the Magistrate of First Class, arguing the position of Mahant to be hereditary and beyond the powers of Panchayat but failed to get any favorable judgement. An appeal was filed at the Lahore High Court in 1917 and the judgement was pronounced on 1 August 1922. Das' dismissal was sustained on rather-technical grounds —he had set up adverse claims to the property in the meanwhile, thus running afoul of Chintaman v. Dhondo— but the Panchayat actions were opined to be unjustifiable irrespective of its legal validity.)

=== Independent Pakistan ===
After the creation of Pakistan, the overwhelming majority of Hindus migrated to India, though a small number who remained in the city continued managing the temple. Eventually, in the 1970s, the image of Narasimha was moved to a temple in Haridwar, following which the Evacuee Trust Property Board (ETPB) assumed control of the site. Under its administration, the temple gradually fell into neglect, and even a madrasa was established within the complex during the 1980s. Nevertheless, the temple remained a prominent landmark in Multan and, for some time, even had a dharamshala.

==== Destruction and aftermath ====
In 1992, following the demolition of the Babri Masjid in Ayodhya, India by Hindus, a Muslim mob attacked and destroyed the temple alongside the dharamshala in retaliation. The temple has remained in ruins ever since. By 2006, squatters had encroached on the lower levels of the structure, and the site was frequently used as a garbage dump.

=== Proposed reconstructions ===
In 2009, the federal government allocated funds to document and preserve the site; the survey determined a risk of an imminent collapse of the temple ruins, but preservation plans were shelved. In May 2015, ETPB announced new plans to restore the temple and, in August, granted a fund of 5 million PKR to the Punjab Archeology Department. However, the local administration refused to issue a No Objection Certificate, apparently fearing local Muslim fanatics.

In February 2021, the Supreme Court of Pakistan established a one-person commission (Note: Dr. Shoaib Suddle was the only member. However, he was supported by three others.) to interrogate the status of minority religious shrines. It criticized ETPB's handling of Hindu shrines and submitted for the immediate restoration of the temple along with the construction of lodging facilities for potential tourists; the government of Punjab and ETPB were ordered to ensure optimum preparedness of the shrine for the Holi festival. Soon, the local "peace committee" — with representatives from the government, civil society, and Ulemas — announced plans to restore the temple to ensure religious harmony.

== Architecture ==
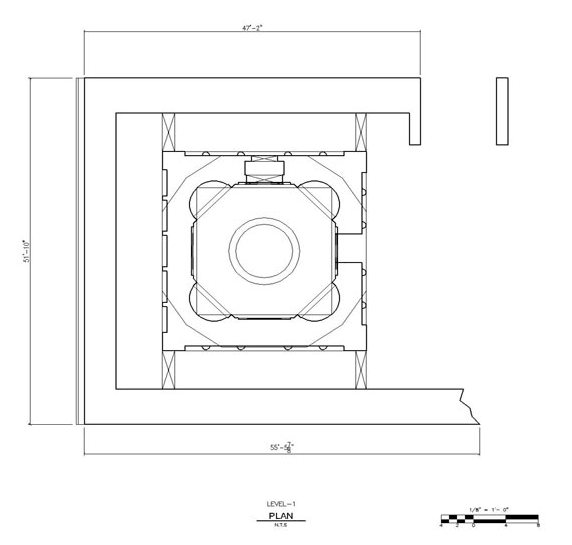
Temple plan

Prior to being demolished, the temple featured a main hall, and circumlocutory passages adorned with skylights. The hall continued to feature a replica of the idol under a baldachin.

== See also ==
- List of Hindu temples in Multan
- Multan Sun Temple
- Hinduism in Pakistan
- Evacuee Trust Property Board
- Mankiala stupa
- Hinglaj Mata
- Kalat Kali Temple
- Katasraj temple
- Sadh Belo
- Shiv Mandir, Umerkot
- Shri Varun Dev Mandir
- Tilla Jogian
