= Siege of Multan (1772) =

Battle of Afghan-Sikh Wars

- Part of the expansion of the Bhangi Misl
Date	25 December 1772
Location	Multan
Result	Bhangi victory
Territorial changes	Multan passed into Bhangi control.

Belligerents
Bhangi Misl	Government of Multan under Sharif Beg Taklu	Forces of Shuja Khan; Bahawalpur State

Commanders and leaders
Jhanda Singh; Ganda Singh; Lehna Singh	Sharif Beg Taklu	Shuja Khan; Jafar Khan of Bahawalpur; Muzaffar Khan

Units involved
Bhangi forces	Multan garrison	Forces of Shuja Khan and Bahawalpur

The Siege of Multan was a siege of Multan in 1772 during a struggle for control of the province between its Afghan claimants and the Bhangi Misl. It ended with the intervention of Jhanda Singh and Ganda Singh, after which the city and fort passed into Bhangi Sikh control. Diwan Singh Chachowalia was left in charge of Multan, and Bhangi rule continued until the city was reconquered by Timur Shah Durrani in 1780.

== Background ==
Changes in the governorship of Multan under Timur Shah Durrani produced a struggle among Shuja Khan, Haji Sharif Khan, and Sharif Beg Taklu. Shuja Khan withdrew to Shujabad and sought to recover his former position with the support of the Nawab of Bahawalpur, while Sharif Beg Taklu held Multan and appealed for outside assistance.

The political crisis in Multan was tied to disputes over revenue, tribute, and financial administration. In one version of events, intrigue involving Shuja Khan, the Nawab of Bahawalpur, and Dharam Das weakened the governor's position. Another version places Dharm Jas at the center of the succession dispute, with Mirza Sharif Beg Tughlu taking charge at Multan before Dharm Jas was killed during the struggle for control of the province.

== Capture of Multan ==
The immediate conflict began when the forces of Shuja Khan and the Nawab of Bahawalpur besieged Multan. Sharif Beg Taklu then invited Jhanda Singh and Ganda Singh to intervene, and the inducement is given as either one lakh of rupees or the surrender of the fort. The Bhangi chiefs marched to Multan with a large force, the besieging forces were defeated, and the city passed into Sikh hands.

The Sikhs then entered the fort after asking permission to visit the temple of Prahladji inside it. Sharif Beg Taklu allowed them to come in small groups, but the entire Sikh force eventually entered the fort. Sharif Beg was permitted to withdraw safely with his family and property to Talamba, from where he later went to Khairpur Tanwin. The fall of Multan is dated to 25 December 1772.

After the conquest, Jhanda Singh left his step-brother Diwan Singh Chachowalia in charge of Multan. Jamait Singh is named as finance minister, while Lehna Singh as military commander. Diwan Singh Chachowalia is also described as the qiladar of Multan. Dipalpur, Kahror, and Fatahpur were leased to Madad Ali Khan of Bahawalpur in an effort to prevent cooperation between the Nawab of Bahawalpur and Shuja Khan. An additional revenue demand was imposed after the conquest.

== Counterattacks ==
Diwan Singh attempted to extend Bhangi authority over Shujabad but failed to capture it. One siege lasted three months and ended without success. After the death of Shuja Khan in 1776, his son Muzaffar Khan succeeded him at Shujabad. Diwan Singh again attacked Shujabad, met strong resistance, and withdrew, while Sikh forces ransacked the district.

A later siege of Multan was undertaken by Muzaffar Khan and the Nawab of Bahawalpur. On the twenty-third day of the siege, a widow named Raju or Rajoo opened one of the city gates for the attackers. The Sikh soldiers withdrew into the fort, and the city was plundered by the besieging forces. Ganda Singh then arrived from Amritsar and repulsed Muzaffar Khan and the Nawab in a bloody fight.

Muzaffar Khan continued to report against the Sikhs of Multan and encouraged resistance to their rule. In 1778 Timur Shah sent Baharu Khan to expel the Sikhs from Multan.He laid siege to the city or fort, but withdrew after receiving orders connected with Timur Shah's conflict in Khorasan and Turan.

== Loss of Multan and later attempts ==
The Bhangi occupation under Diwan Singh lasted from 25 December 1772 to 18 February 1780, when Multan was reconquered by Timur Shah. After the reconquest, the Bhangis continued attempts to recover Multan, but attacks by Sahib Khan Sayal and Karam Singh Bhangi failed.
