= Diwan Singh Chachowalia =

Bhangi governor of Multan (1772–1780)

Bhangi governor of Multan
- In office 1772–1780
- Misaldar: Jhanda Singh Dhillon
- Preceded by: Shuja Khan; Sharif Beg Taklu (as Durrani governors)
- Succeeded by: Muzaffar Khan (as Durrani governor)

Military service
- Battles/wars: Siege of Multan (1772); Siege of Multan (1780)

Diwan Singh Chachowalia was a Bhangi Sikh sardar and warlord who was the governor of Multan between 1772 and 1780 on the behalf of his half-brother Jhanda Singh.

== Biography ==
Diwan Singh was a son of Hari Singh Dhillon and half-brother of Jhanda Singh and Ganda Singh. Multan, which had been under Durrani rule since 1752, had been embroiled in a state of political unrest after Timur Shah Durrani deposed its governor Shuja Khan in April 1772 and appointed Haji Sharif Khan. However, due to his indolence he was deposed as well and Sharif Beg Taklu was appointed to Multan. Shuja Khan, who had previously retired to his newly built fort of Shujabad, besieged Multan with the assistance of Jafar Khan, the Nawab of Bahawalpur.

In exigency Sharif Beg called for the help from Bhangi Sardars. The siege had already gone on for eighteen days by the time they arrived; the forces of Bahawalpur were defeated and Shuja Khan fled to Shujabad. After capturing Multan, the Sikhs allowed Sharif Beg to retire with his family to Tulamba, while Diwan Singh was appointed Multan's governor in December 1772.

Diwan Singh besieged Shujabad thrice but was unsuccessful in conquering it. Meanwhile Shuja Khan died in 1776 and was succeeded by his son Muzaffar Khan. Muzaffar Khan asked for help from Timur Shah against him who invaded Punjab and captured Multan from Diwan Singh on February 18, 1780. However, he allowed Diwan Singh to depart safely with his family, and Muzaffar Khan was appointed the next governor of Multan.

== Sources ==
- Gupta, Hari Ram (2007) [1978]. The Sikh Commonwealth or Rise and Fall of Sikh Misls. History Of The Sikhs. Vol. IV. Munshiram Manoharlal. ISBN 978-81-215-0165-1.
- Chowdhry, Mohindra S. (2024). Sikh Evolution to Revolution. Troubador Publishing Ltd. ISBN 978-1-83628-721-6.
