= Kaga, Afghanistan =

Town in Nangarhar Province, Afghanistan

Kaga
- Town
- Location in Afghanistan
- Coordinates: 34°14′13″N 70°10′50″E
- Country: Afghanistan
- Province: Nangarhar Province
- District: Khogyani
- Time zone: UTC+4:30 (Afghanistan Standard Time)

Kaga (Pashto: کږه; also کژه, Kaẓ̌a or Kazha) is a village in Khogyani District, Nangarhar Province, Afghanistan. The town is located within the heartland of the Khogyani tribe of Pashtuns. It is the primary market-town and capital of the district and the site of offices of the District Governor, District Court, District Hospital, and other government agencies.

== See also ==
- Nangarhar Province
