= Sherzad (Pashtun tribe) =

Sherman tribe

The Sherzad tribe (Pashto: شیرزاد) is one of three major sub-tribes of the Khogyani tribe of the Karlani Pashtun confederation. The Sherzad are primarily found in the central regions of Nangarhar Province, Afghanistan, particularly Sherzad District.
