= Shuja Khan =

Durrani governor of Multan (1767–1772)

Sadozai governor of Multan
- In office 1767–1772
- Monarch: Ahmad Shah Durrani
- Preceded by: Ali Mohammad Khan Khakwani
- Succeeded by: Nawab Haji Sharif Muhammad Khan Sadozai (as Durrani governor); Diwan Singh Chachowalia (as Bhangi governor)

Personal details
- Died: 1776 Shujabad (present day Pakistan)
- Children: Muzaffar Khan
- Parent: Nawab Zahid Khan (father)

Nawab Shuja Khan was the Sadozai governor of Multan between 1767 and 1772.

A son of Zahid Khan, the Mughal Subedar of Multan, he had been appointed as governor of Multan by Ahmad Shah Abdali, however, was deposed and put into prison by Ali Mohammad Khan Khakwani. Ultimately Khakwani was executed and Shuja Khan was confirmed on his position in 1767. In 1772 he was again deposed and replaced with Nawab Haji Sharif Muhammad Khan Sadozai by Timur Shah Durrani, who in turn was replaced with Sharif Beg Taklu. Shuja Khan requested aid from the Nawab of Bahawalpur Jafar Khan to regain control of Multan and besieged it in December 1772. The Bhangi Sikhs took benefit of the political chaos and captured Multan, with Diwan Singh Chachowalia being placed as the Sikh governor. Shuja Khan retired to his newly built fort of Shujabad, where he died in 1776.

Shuja Khan was the father of Nawab Muzaffar Khan. He founded the Shujabad town in 1750 and built the fortification wall between 1767 and 1772.

== Sources ==
- Griffin, Lepel. H (1890). The Punjab Chiefs. Vol. I. Civil And Military Gazette Press Lahore. pp. 78–80.
