= Sherzad District =

Sherzad District Pashto: شېرزاد ولسوالۍ
- District
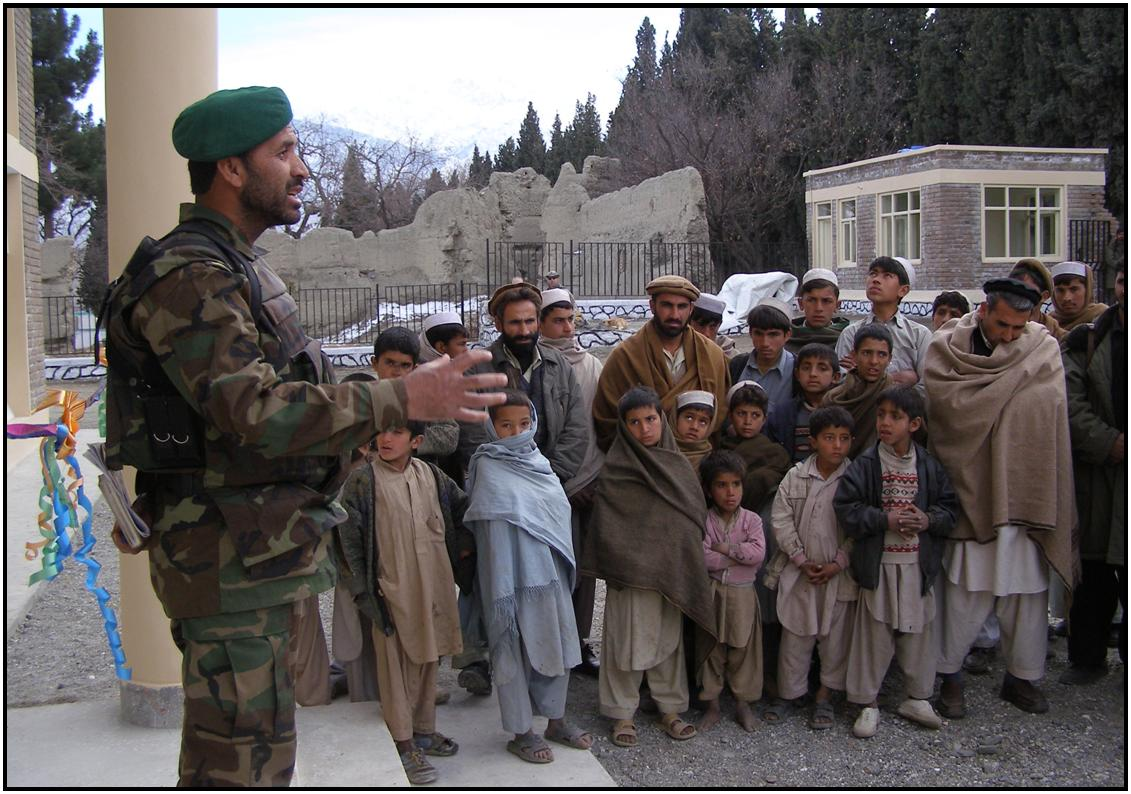
- An Afghan Army captain addresses Sherzad village.

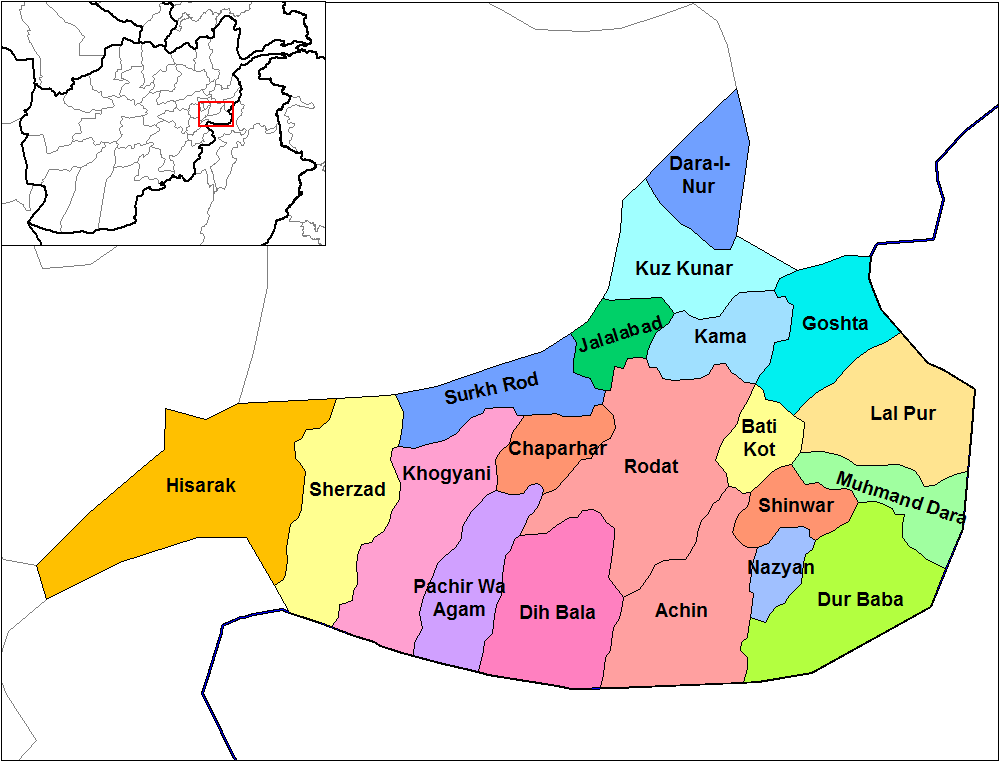
- Sherzad District is located in the west of Nangarhar Province.
- Country: Afghanistan
- Province: Nangarhar Province
- District center: Sherzad

Population (2002)
  - Total: 66,392
- Time zone: UTC+4:30 (D† (Afghanistan Standard Time))

Sherzad District (Pashto: شېرزاد ولسوالۍ); is a district in the west of Nangarhar Province, Afghanistan. It has a short (approximately 5 km) stretch of border with Pakistan. Its population, which is 100% Pashtun, was estimated at 66,392 in 2002, of whom 26,500 were children under 12. The district center is the village of Sherzad, whose population is 100% Pashtun who speak Pashto.

A large portion of the population belongs to the Shirzad sub-tribe of the Khogyani Karlan Pashtun tribe. In 2019, Afghan Special Forces raided the district, killing 43 Taliban militants. US forces also conducted airstrikes in the district.
