= Shakir Shuja Abadi =

Pakistani Saraiki poet (born c. 1953)

Shakir Shuja Abadi شاکر شجاع آبادی
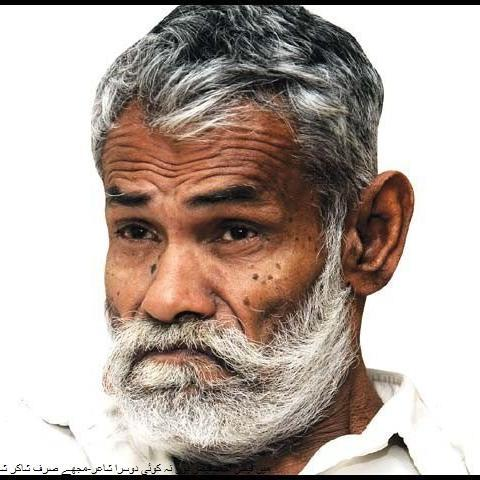
- Born: 1953 or 1954; Shujabad, Pakistan
- Known for: Saraiki poetry
- Spouse: Shabnam Shakir
- Awards: Honorary doctoral degree (Ph.D) Award by the Islamia University Bahawalpur in 2023; Sitara-i-Imtiaz (Star of Excellence) Award by the President of Pakistan in 2023; Pride of Performance Award by the Government of Pakistan in 2017

Shakir Shuja Abadi (Note: Urdu: شاکر شجاع آبادی) is a prominent Saraiki-language poet (born 25 February 1954) in Shujabad, a small city near Multan, Pakistan.

== Career ==
His first proper Mushaira (live poetry symposium) was held in 1986, and then he was a leading Seraiki language poet at another 'mushaira' in 1991.

In 2016, at a book launching ceremony in Lodhran, Punjab, the President of Urdu Department at Allama Iqbal Open University of Islamabad was quoted as saying:

"Shakir Shuja Abadi is a renowned name in Saraiki poetry who holds true heart and feelings. Such poets always hold higher place in the society as their poetry depicts true aspects of personal and social life."

In 2017, he received his second presidential award. He reportedly said to reporters at that event:

"People of different religions and castes love me because of my poetry, regardless of the fact whether I profess the same faith or not. I am the voice of all broken souls and express their feelings through my poetry."

== Selected poetry ==
- Tu Mehnat Kar, Tay Mehnat Da Silla Jaane Khuda Jaane
  (Just Work Hard and Reward for that hard work; only God knows what you will get)
- Tu Dewa Baal Kay Rakh Shakir, Hawa Jaane Khuda Jaane
  (Light the Lamp Shakir, and let the Wind and God decide its fate)

== Awards and recognition ==
- Honorary PhD degree from the Islamia University of Bahawalpur, November 2023
- Sitara-i-Imtiaz (Star of Excellence) Award by the President of Pakistan in 2023
- Pride of Performance Award by the Government of Pakistan in 2017
