= Shrine of Bahauddin Zakariya =

13th-century monument in Multan, Pakistan

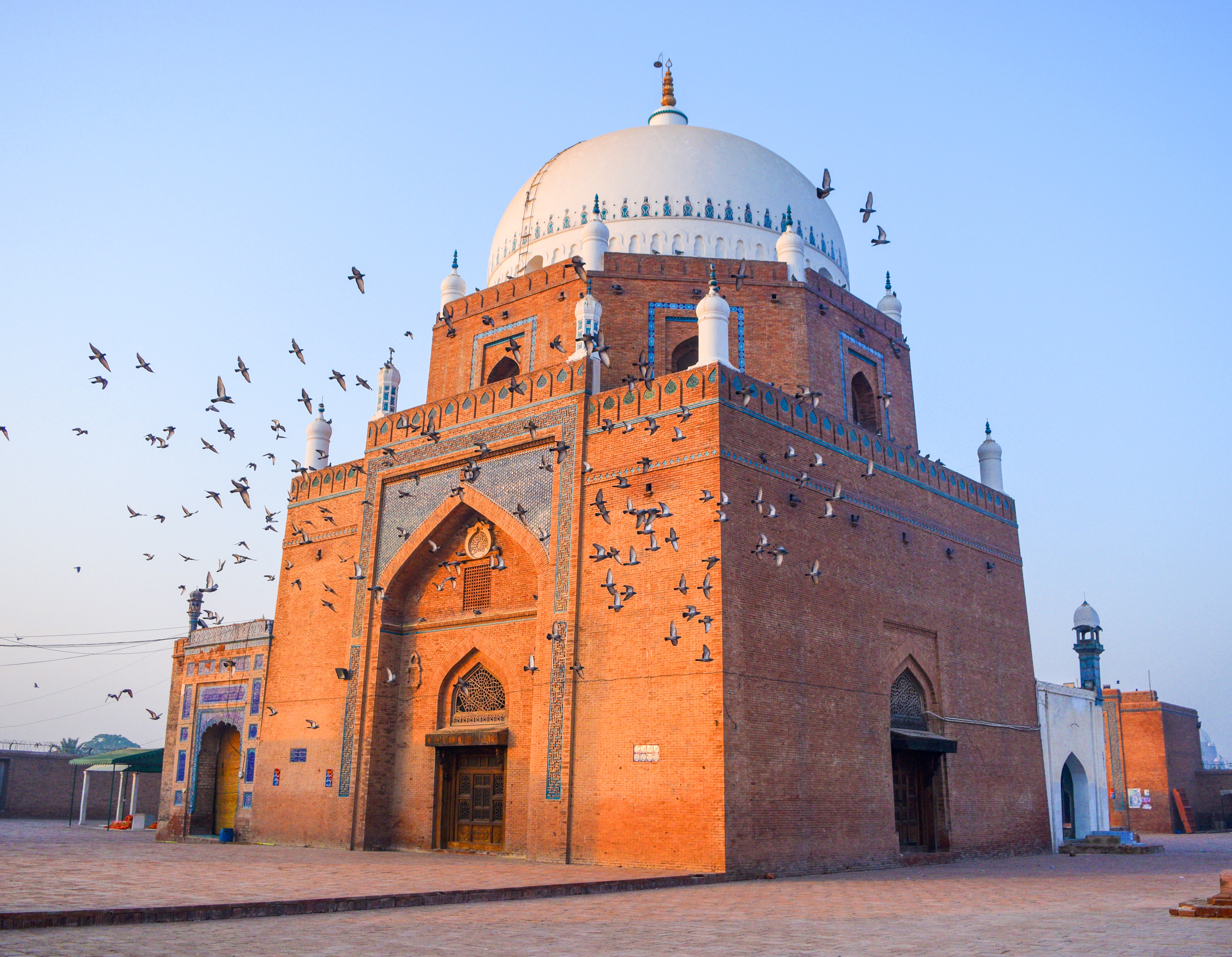
- The shrine of Bahauddin Zakariya
- Interactive map of Shrine of Bahauddin Zakariya
- Location: Multan, Punjab, Pakistan
- Coordinates: 30°12′02″N 71°28′35″E
- Type: Sufi shrine
- Completion date: 1262 C.E.

The Shrine of Bahauddin Zakariya is a 13th-century shrine located in Multan, Punjab, Pakistan. The tomb is dedicated to the Sufi mystic Bahauddin Zakariya, of the Suhrawardiyya order of Sufism. It considered to be one of the most important Muslim shrines in the wider Punjab region, and is the prototype for Multan's classical architectural style.

== Background ==
By the 13th century, the belief that the spiritual powers of great Sufi saints were attached to their burial sites was widespread in the Muslim world, and so a shrine was built to commemorate the burial site of Bahauddin Zakariya.

In keeping with Sufi tradition in Punjab, the shrine's influence is augmented by smaller shrines spread throughout the region around Multan. These secondary shrines form a wilayat, or a "spiritual territory" of the primary shrine. As home to the primary shrine, Multan serves as the capital of Bahauddin Zakariya's wilayat. The shrine's wilayat is noted to border the spiritual territory of the Shrine of Baba Farid, based in Pakpattan.

== History ==
The shrine was built in 1262 before the death of Zakariya in 1268. Unusual for a dervish, the structure was paid for at the expense of Bahauddin Zakariya - highlighting his unique financial independence.

Dara Shikoh unsuccessfully attempted to win the loyalty of Multan's citizens by donating 25,000 Rupees to the shrine following his defeat by his brother at the Battle of Samugarh in 1658.

The shrine's sajjada nashin, or hereditary caretaker, Makhdoom Mahmud assisted British forces against Sikh forces during the Siege of Multan in 1848. The shrine's cupola and part of its upper tier were damaged during the siege by British cannonballs, but were repaired soon afterwards.

== Architecture ==
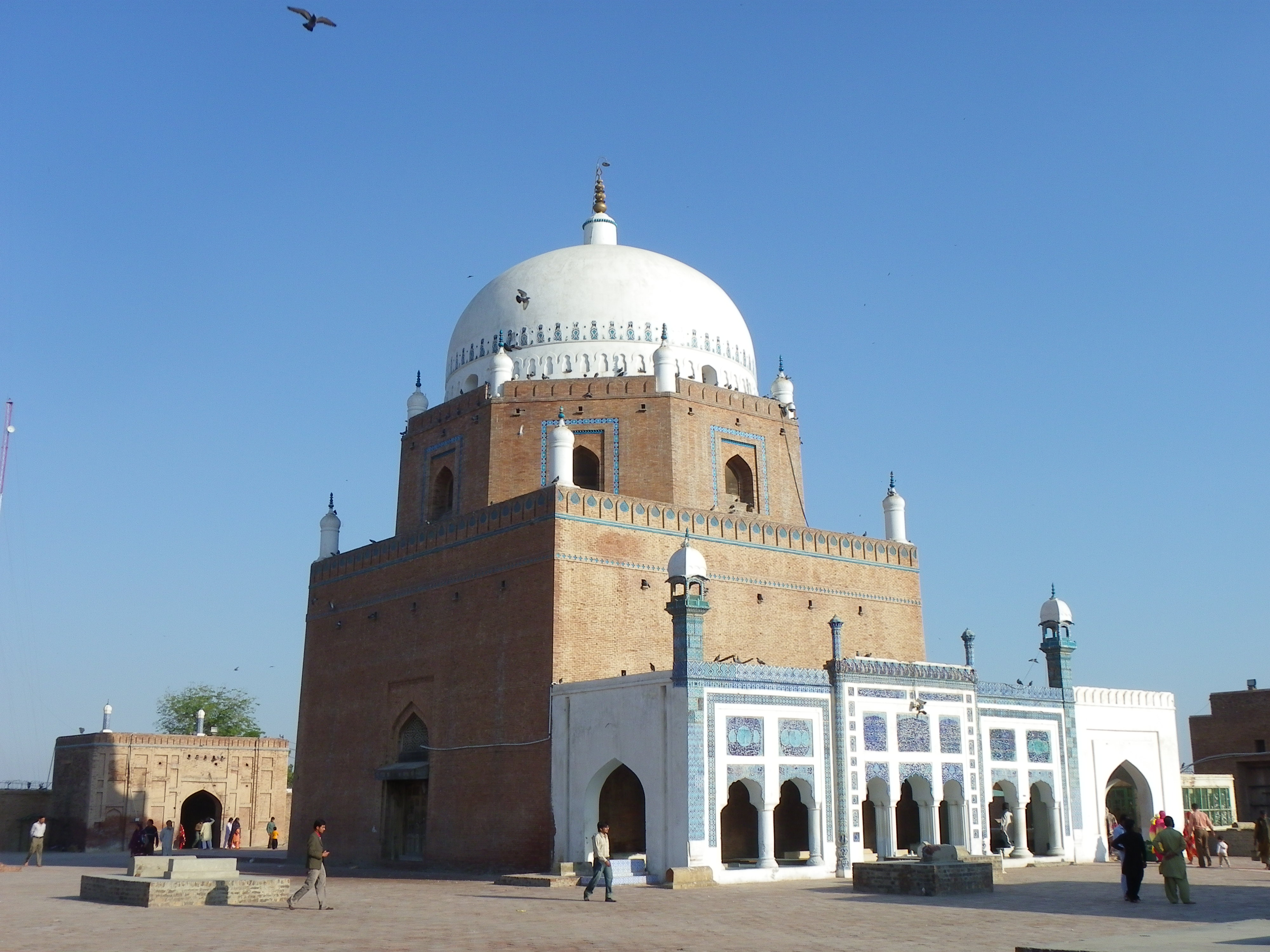
The shrine features a two-tiered design, and became the prototype for Multan's distinct architectural style.

The mausoleum was built as a two-tiered structure that is the prototype for early shrines throughout southern Punjab. The mausoleum's base is the shape of a square, built over an area of 51 ft 9 in (15.77 m). Above the square base is an octagonal tier, about half the height of the square, which is topped by a white hemispherical dome. A vast courtyard surrounds the shrine that covers several hundreds square metres. The walls surrounding the courtyard were built by the Durrani governor of Multan, Nawab Ali Mohammad Khan Khakwani in the 18th century.

The mausoleum is built of brick, and is the earlier building to be decorated with glazed blue tiles, which later became a typical style of Multan and south Punjab. The use of blue tiles reflects the influence of immigrant architects from Central Asia, who were active in the region in the 13th century. A spacious brick verandah with a painted wooden ceiling was added to the shrine in 1952. Large wooden doors provide entry into the inner sanctum of the shrine from the veranda.

The shrine is surrounded by hundreds of secondary graves belonging to descendants and devotees of Bahauddin Zakariya.

== Traditions ==
Qawwali songs and trance-like dancing are performed nightly after evening prayers at the shrine. The shrine is important to members of the Barelvi sect of Islam, while Deobandis shun the shrine and practices performed there. Devotees at the shrine perform the ritual of mannat, or tying threads throughout the shrine as symbols of prayer. The shrine is popularly believed to protect boatsmen on the Indus River and Chenab River.

A class of devotees known as Qureishi, associate themselves with Zakariya and claim descent from the Quraysh tribe of the Prophet Muhammed. The Qureishi are held in high-esteem throughout south Punjab in Pakistan. One of the Qureishi, Shah Mehmood Qureshi, rose to the position of Pakistan's Minister of Foreign Affairs.

== Administration ==
Hereditary caretakers of the shrine, known as sajjada nashin claim descent from Zakariya. Some caretakers have been held in high-esteem, and have maintained influence in politics. Shah Mehmood Qureshi, member of the Pakistan Tehreek-e-Insaf political party, is Sajjada Nashin of the shrine.

== See also ==
- List of mausolea and shrines in Pakistan
- Sufism in Pakistan
- Sufism

== Gallery ==
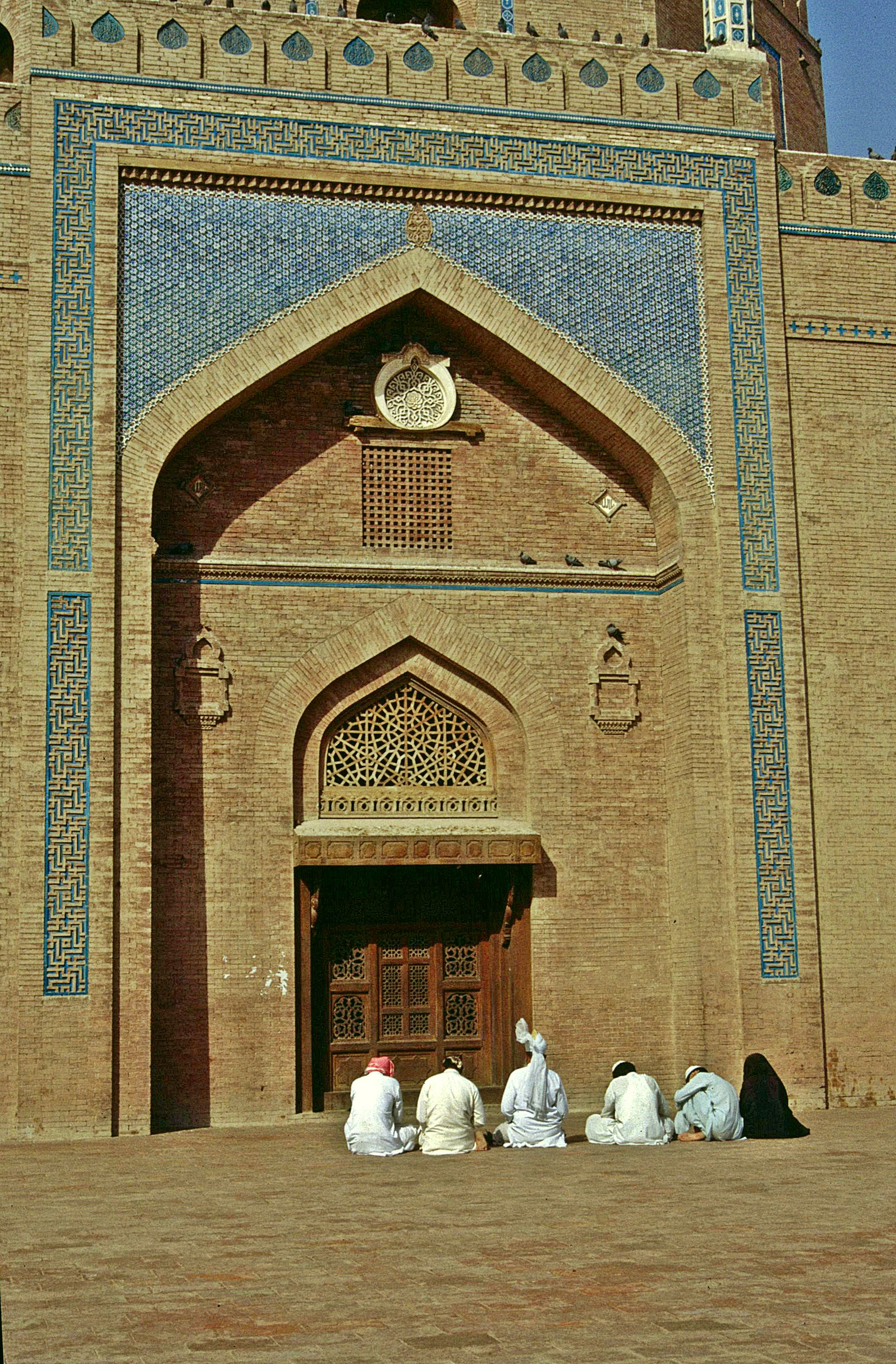
Supplicants occasionally gather at the entrance to the mausoleum

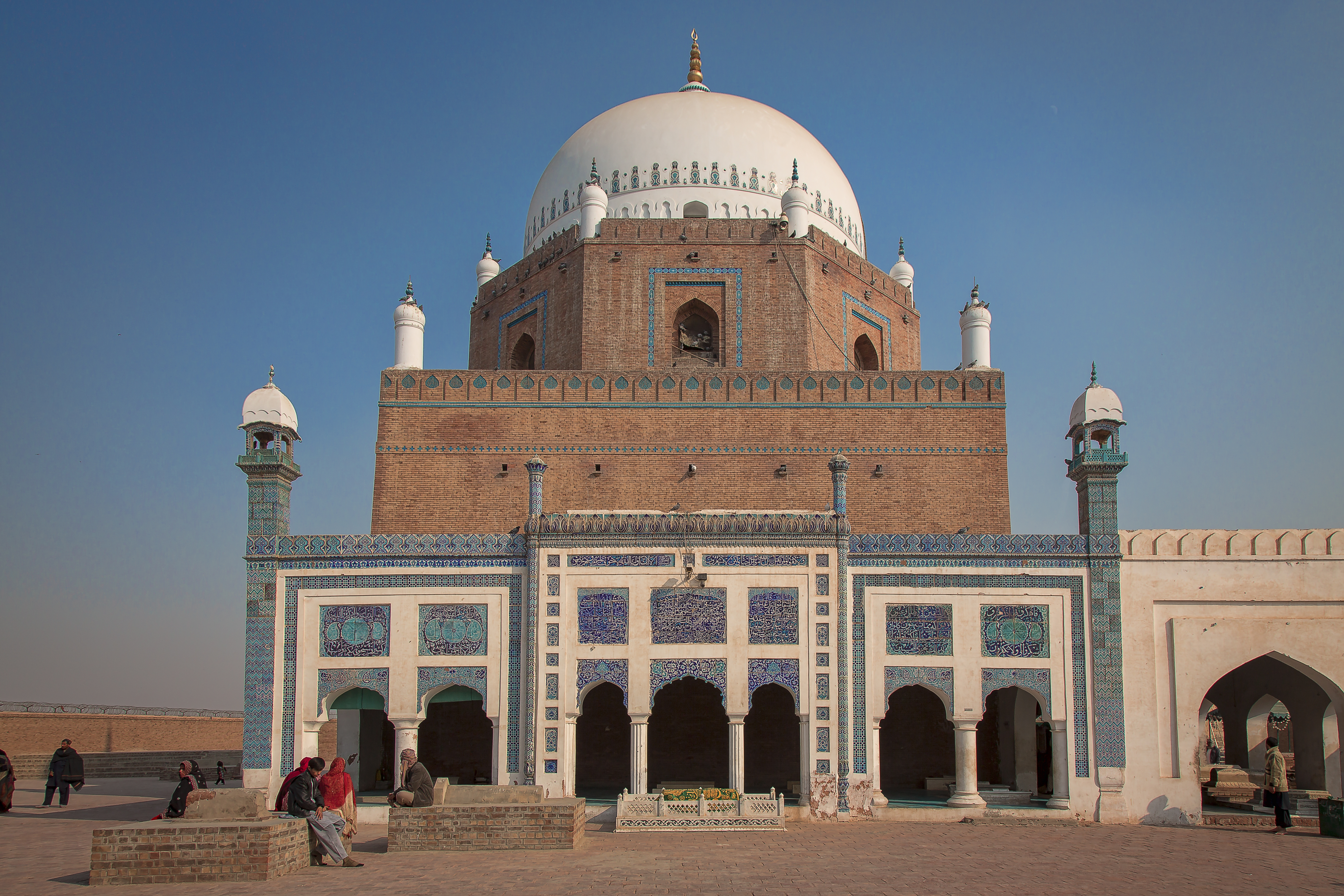

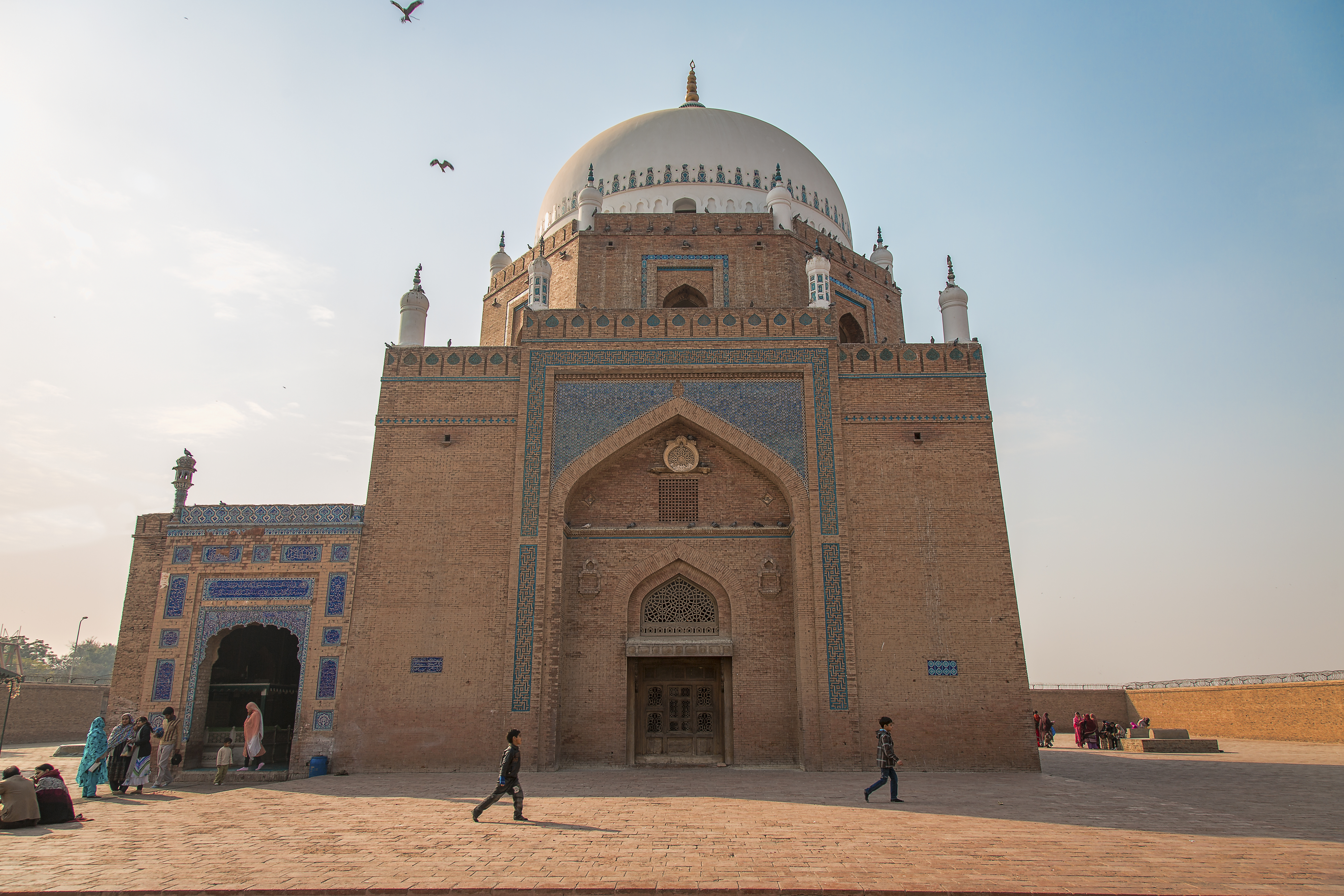

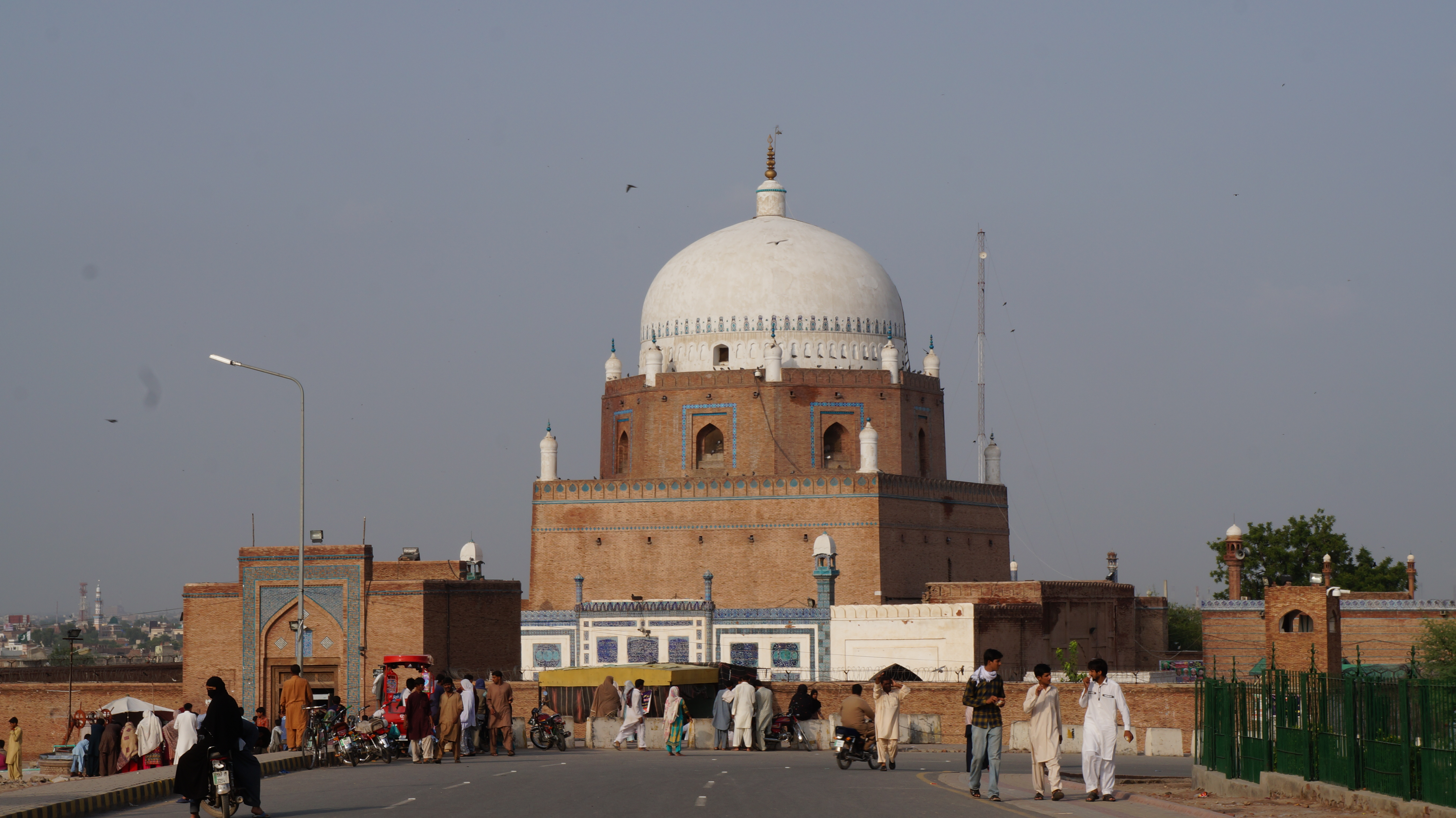

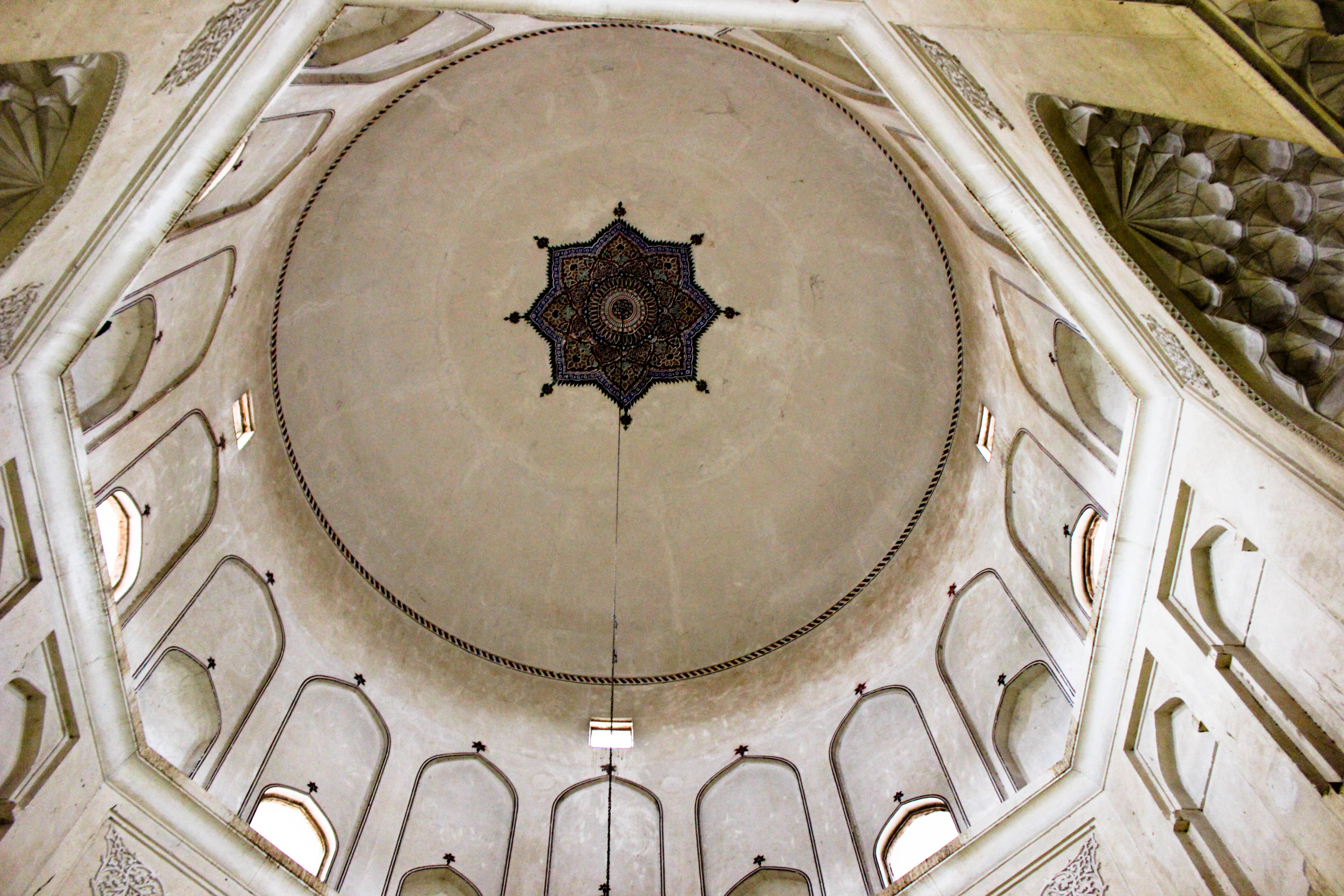
Underside of the mausoleum's dome

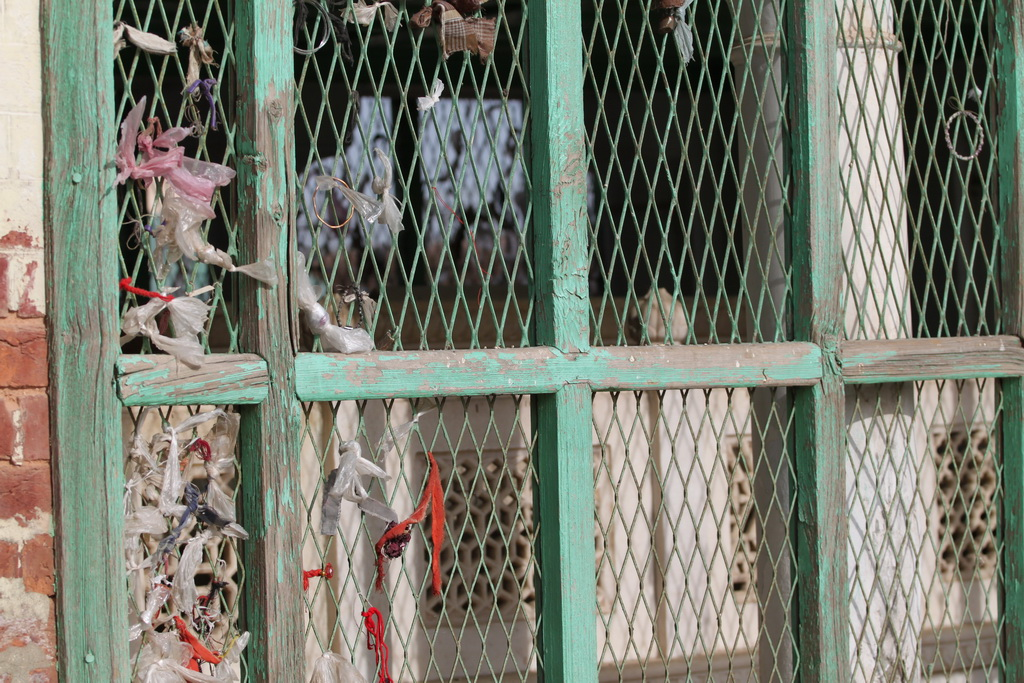
Devotees and pilgrims tie strings to the shrine as a supplication and request for intercession known as mannat
