= List of Hindu temples in Multan =

There are several Hindu temples in Multan, a city in the Punjab province of Pakistan. The temples, known as Mandirs, exist because the population of Multan followed Hinduism, Buddhism and tribal religions before the arrival of Islam. In 997 CE, Sultan Mahmud Ghaznavi, took over the Ghaznavid dynasty empire established by his father, Sultan Sebuktegin, In 1005 he conquered the Hindu Shahis in Kabul in 1005, and followed it by the conquests of Punjab region. The Delhi Sultanate and later Mughal Empire ruled the region. There were two places in Multan from that period of considerable antiquity.

== Sun Mandir ==
The most important place of the Hindu period was the "Sun Mandir". It was the most important place of worship throughout the South Asia as referred to in many books. It was situated on old Fort near Shah Rukn-e-Alam shrine. The ruins of Sun Mandir are located near the High Court of Multan.

== Suraj Kund ==
Another place was "Suraj Kund" (the pool of sun). It is about five miles to the south of Multan on the Bahawalpur Road. It was a pond 132 feet in diameter and 10 feet deep when full of water. Sawn Mal the Sikh Diwan surrounded it with an octagonal wall. It was a place of pilgrimage till 1947 and two fairs were held here annually. One on the 7th of the Vanishing moon of Bhadon, and the other on the 7th of the rising moon of Magh, the numbers having references to the seven hours of the Sun's Chariot, according to the Hindu belief of the seven Rishies.

== Prahladpuri Temple ==
The temple of Narasimha built by Prahlada, known as Prahladpuri Temple.

== Narsinghpuri Temple ==
The temple of Narsinghpuri dedicated to Narasimha was originally inside the Multan Fort. Later, due to restrictions of timings for going inside the main area of fort, a temple of same name was built in main Sabz Mandi (Market) area of town.
