= Rana Ijaz Ahmad Noon =

Pakistani Politician

Provincial Assembly Of The Punjab
- In office 2002–present
- Nominated by: Government Member Of Agriculture Commission Punjab
- Minister: Ex Minister Of Punjab
- Constituency: PP-222 (Shujabad)

Parliamentary Secretary for agriculture
- Incumbent
- Assumed office 6 March 2024

Personal details
- Born: 8 April 1968 (age 58) Shujabad, Multan District, Pakistan
- Party: PMLN (2013-present)
- Education: Bachelor of Arts
- Profession: Politician

Rana Ijaz Ahmad Noon is a Pakistani politician who was a Member of the Provincial Assembly of the Punjab, from 2002 to January 2023, 4 times consecutive Member of Provincial Assembly Punjab with Preliminarily Secretary of Agriculture and Senior Minister of Punjab Pakistan.

== Early life and education ==
He was born on 8 April 1968 in Multan.

He received his early education from Aitchison College and obtained a degree of Bachelor of Arts in 1989 from Government College University.

== Political career ==
He was elected to the Provincial Assembly of the Punjab as a candidate of Pakistan Muslim League (Q) (PML-Q) from Constituency PP-204 (Multan-XI) in the 2002 Pakistani general election. He received 31,498 votes and defeated Rafique Ahmad, a candidate of Pakistan Muslim League (N) (PML-N).

He was re-elected to the Provincial Assembly of the Punjab as a candidate of PML-Q from Constituency PP-204 (Multan-XI) in the 2008 Pakistani general election. He received 32,704 votes and defeated Khurram Fareed Khan, a candidate of Pakistan Peoples Party.

He was re-elected to the Provincial Assembly of the Punjab as a candidate of PML-N from Constituency PP-204 (Multan-XI) in the 2013 Pakistani general election.

In December 2013, he was appointed Parliamentary Secretary for agriculture.

He was re-elected to Provincial Assembly of the Punjab as a candidate of PML-N from Constituency PP-221 (Multan-XI) in the 2018 Pakistani general election.
