= Khogyani District =

- District
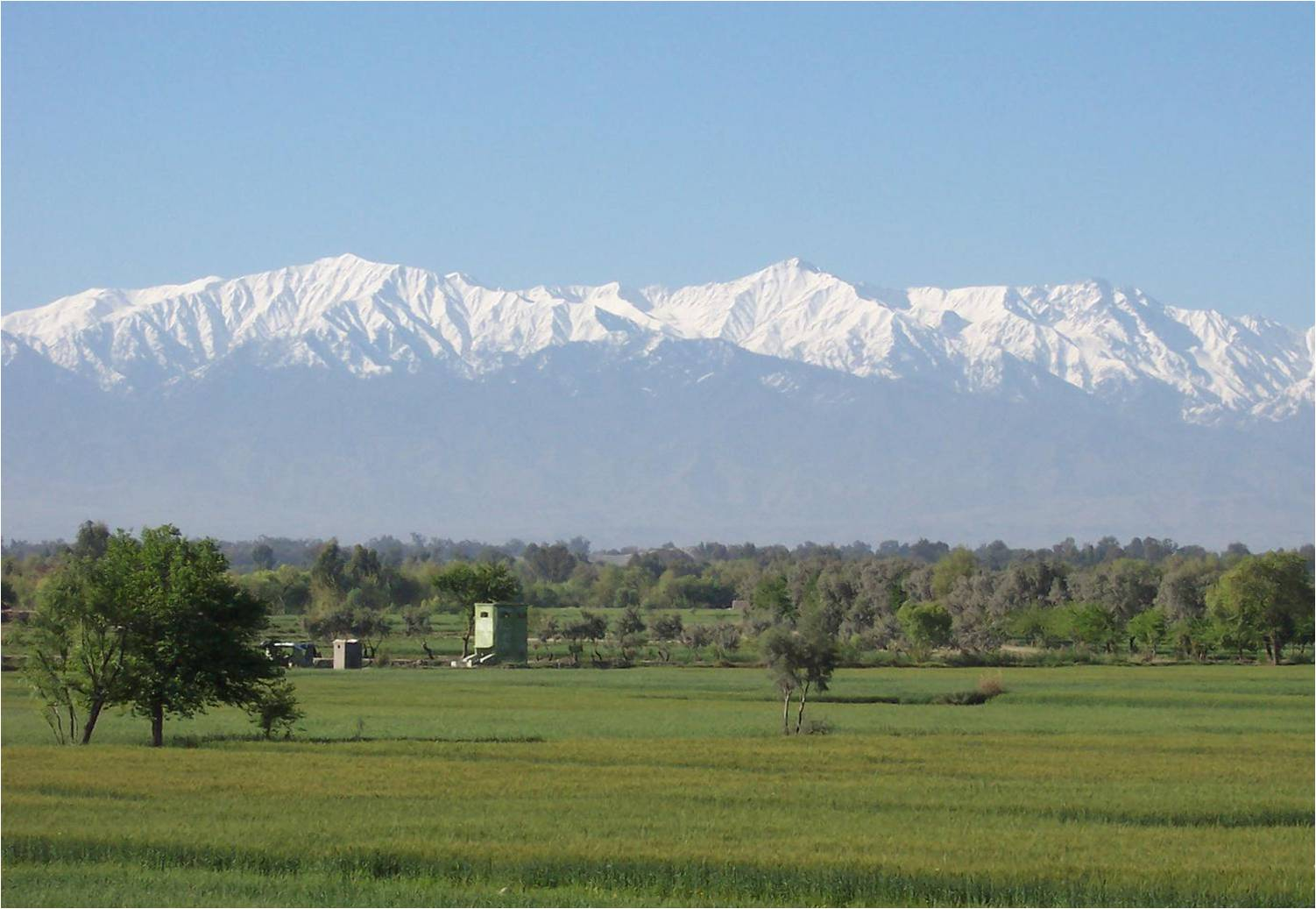
- Khogyani District, looking south

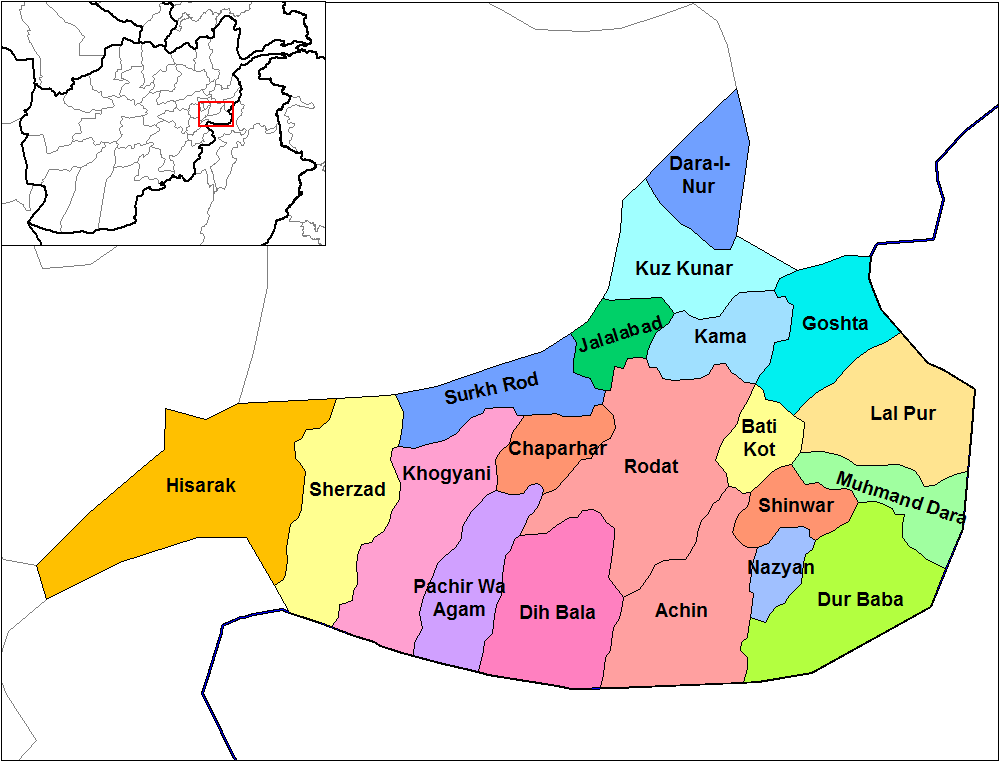
- Khogyani District is located in the south-west of Nangarhar Province.
- Country: Afghanistan
- Province: Nangarhar Province
- District center: Kaga
- Time zone: UTC+4:30 (D† (Afghanistan Standard Time))

Khogyani (Pashto: خوږياڼي ولسوالۍ) is a district in the south of Nangarhar Province, Afghanistan, bordering Pakistan. Its population is entirely Pashtun, and was estimated at 146,852 in 2002. The district is within the heartland of the Khogyani tribe of Pashtuns. The district centre is the village of Kaga (or Kazha). The offices of the District Governor, District Court, District Hospital, and other government agencies are in Kaga. Kaga is the economic center of the district; however Wazir is the second largest market place. Kaga town is connected with Jalalabad City through paved road. Wazir is also connected through a paved road with Kaga.

Khogyani was one of the places in Afghanistan, where poppy cultivation got its highest point in Nangarhar Province. Although Khogyani is a district by itself, it is divided by other several districts. Khogyani is famous for its pleasant weather, and high-quality fruits. Its apricots, walnuts, almonds and grapes are famous in Nangarhar province and throughout Afghanistan.

== District Leadership ==
The District Governor of Khogyani is Changes frequently.

== Justice Sector ==
Afghan officials and elders from Khogyani District celebrated the inauguration of the Khogyani Courthouse on 7 October 2006. The ceremony was attended by the Sub-Governor, judge and several elders. The elders saw the building as a sign of ISAF support for the district. The project started 1 July 2006 and cost $100,000.

== Education ==
In February 2003, Eco Himal started a new educational project in Eastern Afghanistan by Youths and elders of Services. As a first step they built two large schools in the Khogyani District, one of which is designed for girls. The two schools are located in the villages Nokur Khel and Ahmand Khel (Wazir). Constructed earthquake-resistant and in the typical local style, they include sanitation and basic equipment. They were officially inaugurated in March 2004 and together will be attended by more than 1,440 boys and girls. Since the schools have been approved by the Directorate for Education in Nangarhar Province the teachers' salaries and maintenance of the buildings will be covered by the Afghan government.

== Infrastructure ==
On May 10, 2006, government officials and community elders publicly opened the 21.25 km farm to market road in Khogyani District of Nangarhar province. The road was built with the assistance of the USAID PRT. This road is part of the 72 km farm to markets road program which covers Bihsud, Khogyani, Sherzad, Shinwar, Bati Kot and Pachir Aw Agam districts of Nangarhar Province. According to the community, the road will not only help farmers send their agriculture products to nearby markets, but facilitate better transportation especially for expectant mothers and children. In the ceremony a local elder said: "Khogyani is like a white cloth where a minor color stain is highly visible, similar is Khogyani where a small assistance is felt, valued and appreciated." USAID assistance for the Khogyani project was $374,000 and completed in a six-month period. This 72 km project totals $1.2 million.

== Commerce ==
Kaga is the main market town for the Khogyani district. Six miles south, water gurgles in irrigation channels. Fields of wheat and poppy push close. Okra, eggplant, pomegranates, grapes and apricots are abundant; the hills are rich with marble and talc. However, bad roads keep much of it from getting to market.

== Natural Disasters ==
On April 17, 2009, two earthquakes killed at least 22 people, injured 30, and destroyed several hundred homes when they struck two hours apart in eastern Afghanistan. The quakes hit overnight the district of Khogyani in Nangarhar province near the Pakistan border. Four villages were seriously damaged by the two earthquakes.
