= Ali Muhammad Khan Mosque =

Mosque in Multan, Punjab, Pakistan

- علی محمد خان مسجد

Religion
- Affiliation: Islam

Location
- Location: Multan
- Country: Pakistan
- Interactive map of Ali Muhammad Khan Mosque
- Administration: Punjab Auqaf and Religious Affairs Department
- Coordinates: 30.1937669490077°N 71.4732952686031°E

Architecture
- Type: Mosque
- Style: Mughal architecture
- Established: 1753 A.D. (1171 Hijri
- Minaret: 1

Ali Muhammad Khan Mosque, also referred to as Wali Muhammad Mosque, or Masjid Wali Muhammad, is a historic mosque in Multan, Punjab, Pakistan, that is currently under the administration of the Auqaf Department.

== History ==
Ali Muhammad Khan Mosque was erected in 1753 (1171 Hijri) in the midst of Chowk Bazaar by the then-Multan Governor, Nawab Ali Mohammad Khan Khakwani, during Mughal emperor Alamgir II's reign.

In the era of Sikh governance, the Sikh governor would hold court at the mosque's main entrance, with the Guru Granth Sahib housed in the primary prayer hall.

Following their ascension to power in the subcontinent, the British rulers returned the mosque to the Muslim community during the 19th century. The mosque had been under the management of the Awan family's hereditary custodians for an extended period before the Auqaf Department assumed control in 1960.

== Architecture ==
Ali Muhammad Khan Mosque's complex features a small three-bay mosque at one end of a large courtyard, with a significantly larger gatehouse facing it from the opposite side. Both structures are adorned in the late Mughal style with Shah-Jahani cusped arches and floral wall designs. The mosque entrances have shallow muqarnas vaulting. Multan's characteristic blue glazed tiles are sparingly used, primarily on the spandrels of the arches and columns dividing the bays.

The mosque has a Kashigari-style interior design, a large prayer hall, a pool for performing ablutions and bathing, and two resting rooms for worshippers.
