= Khogyani (Pashtun tribe) =

Karlāṇī tribe of the Pashtun people

The Khugyani (Pashto: خوږیاڼی) Khogyani or Khogiani tribe are one of the Karlāṇī tribes of the Pashtun people. The tribe originated in the Khogyani district in Nangarhar province of Afghanistan. The Khogyani District is in eastern Nangarhar province of Afghanistan, near the city of Jalalabad and the Kōh-i-Safēd (White mountain range). Descendants of Khogianis in the Indian subcontinent are known as Khakwanis.

== Background ==
The Khogyani tribal root is the Karlāṇī Pashtuns. In the folklore origin of the Karlāṇī tribal confederacy, of which the Khogyani form a part, Karlāṇī (Pashto: کرلاڼي), the Karlāṇī branch of the Pashtuns descend.

The Khogyani tribe itself consists of five clans: Mohsin Zai, Daulat Zai, Maroof Zai, Saib Zai and Chopan Zai.

A mountain people, Khogianis were often embroiled in wars against the Shinwari and the Ghilzai tribes. The Karlāṇī tribes in general have a reputation amongst other Pashtun tribes as especially skilled fighters. The Karlāṇī themselves maintain that they have never been subjugated by a foreign power and that they continue to live their lives by unchanged, age-old tradition.

== Emergence in the subcontinent ==
The ancestors of this tribe came to the Indian subcontinent some 450 years ago. The first Khogyani tribal head was Malik Shahpal, who was invited to attend the royal court by Emperor Humayun. Shahpal founded the colony Kiri Afghana in Multan city. His tribe settled there and gained a substantial amount of power and influence.

Following Malik Shahpal, came Khudadad Khan from Ghazni. From the Chopanzai clan, he settled in the district of Multan. His descendants influenced the region, with the help of the Afghan rulers. When Multan was annexed with Afghanistan, Nawab Ali Mohammad Khan Khakwani was appointed as governor. He built the Mosque 'Ali Mohammad Khan'. Khogyani peoples continued to live around Multan, holding vast tracts of land with substantial holdings in Vehari, Shujaabad, Khanewal, Bahawalpur, Bahawalnagar, Dera Ghazi Khan, Dera Ismail Khan, Rahimyar Khan, and Layyah districts of Pakistan. They are still a wealthy and influential family, and the single largest landowners of their region.

== During Pashtun rule ==
Multan during the Mughal Empire flourished and had good administrative control. However, as central control waned during the decline of the empire, it was ruled by the local Pashtun tribes. The Khogyani tribe had good relations with the Afghan Mughals, as well as the Bahawalpur state. Multan remained under the Khogyani for a long period of time. It is believed that the Khogyani gave refuge to Ahmad Shāh Durrānī's mother. Ahmad Shāh Durrānī was born in Multan. Later, the Khogyani paid taxes to the central government in Kabul and remained the Nawabs for an extended period of time.

== Personalities ==
Hazrat Chopan Khan Khogiani was a famous saint and his shrine is located in Ghazni.

=== Other people of note ===
- Nawab Ali Mohammad Khan Khakwani
- Mohammad Yunus Khalis

== See also ==
- Punjab
- History of Afghanistan
- History of Punjab
- History of Multan
