= Ali Mohammad Khakwani =

Durrani governor of Multan (1752–1767)

Nawab Ali Mohammad Khan Khakwani
- علي محمد خان خوګیاڼی

Durrani Subahdar of Multan
- In office 1752–1758
- Monarch: Ahmad Shah Durrani
- Preceded by: Khwaja Ishak (as deputy-governor of Kaura Mal)
- Succeeded by: Salih Muhammad Khan (on behalf of Adina Beg Khan)
- In office 1760–1761
- Monarch: Ahmad Shah Durrani
- Preceded by: Bapuji Trimbak (as Maratha Governor)
- Succeeded by: Abdul Karim Khan; Allahyar Khan Bamzai (Joint tenure)
- In office 1766–1767
- Monarch: Ahmad Shah Durrani
- Preceded by: Shuja Khan
- Succeeded by: Shuja Khan

Personal details
- Died: 1767 Multan, Durrani Empire (present-day Punjab, Pakistan)
- Cause of death: Execution by throwing into irons.

Ali Mohammad Khan Khakwani was the Durrani governor of Multan, with several interruptions, between 1752 and 1767.

Ethnically from the Pashtun Khakwani tribe, he was appointed as the Nawab of Multan by Ahmad Shah Abdali after his invasion in 1752. His rule was interrupted by Maratha invasion in 1758 and Ali Muhammad Khan was forced to flee, however, he returned in 1760 along with Ahmed Shah and was reinstated. After a brief interval he was deposed and replaced with Shuja Khan, but Ali Muhammad Khan took up arms against Shuja Khan and put him into prison after deposing him. Ultimately Ali Muhammad Khan was arrested and executed by Ahmad Shah Abdali in 1767. He is known for building the Ali Muhammad Khan Mosque in the Chowk bazaar, Multan.

== Sources ==
- Griffin, Lepel. H (1890). The Punjab Chiefs. Vol. I. Civil And Military Gazette Press Lahore. pp. 78–79.
