= Shujabad =

Town in Multan, Pakistan

Shujabad شُجاع آباد Shujaabad
- City
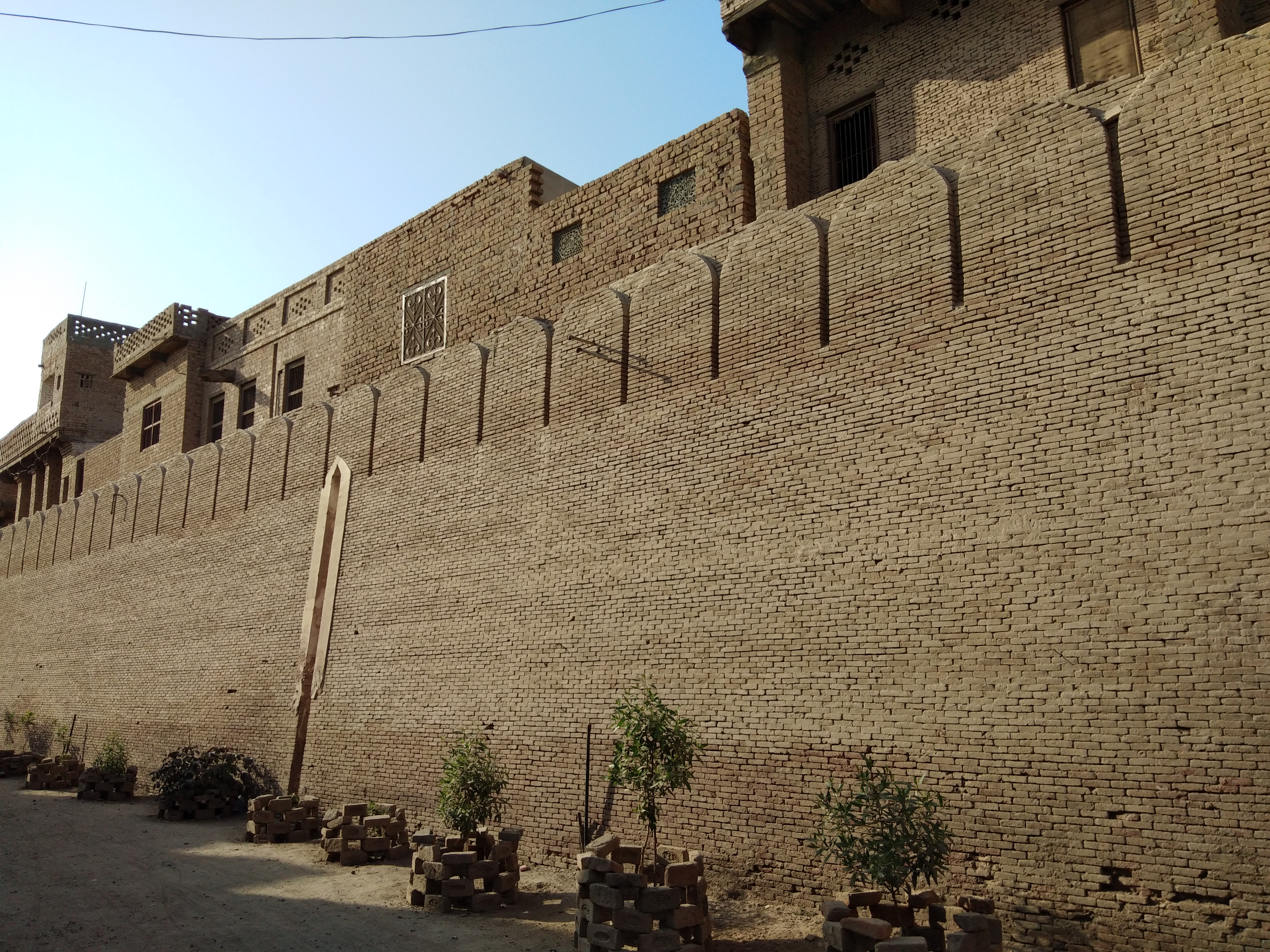
- Fortification wall of Shujabad city

- Location within Pakistan
- Coordinates: 29°52′45″N 71°18′10″E
- Country: Pakistan
- Province: (Punjab, Pakistan) Punjab

Government
  - Type: Municipal Committee
  - Municipal Officer (Planning): Ahmad Hussain
  - Municipal Officer (Infrastructure): Riaz Ahmad
- Elevation: 152 m (499 ft)

Population (2023 Census)
  - City: 151,115
  - Rank: 77th in Pakistan
- Time zone: UTC+5 (PST)

Shujabad (Urdu: شُجاع آباد) is a city and the capital of Shujabad Tehsil of Multan District in the Punjab province of Pakistan. It is located 45 km (28 mi) in south off Multan. Chenab River flows in the west of the city. Neighbouring settlements include Jalalpur Pirwala, Multan and Lodhran.

== History ==
Shujabad is a historical city which dates back to the time of its capture by Muhammad ibn Qasim in 711 AD. The name of Shujabad is derived from its Afghan ruler's name Nawab Shuja Khan, the second son of Nawab Zahid Khan who twice remained the governor (Subedar) of Multan under Ahmed Shah Durrani's rule (also known as Ahmad Shah Abdali). He founded the Shujabad city in 1750 and built the fortification wall between 1767 and 1772. He left Multan and came to Shujabad in 1772 to save his life after he was badly defeated by the Mughals who laid siege to Multan. He hid in the fort to save himself from the Mughal Army and died in 1775 AD and was buried outside the city in a locality known as Basti Khairpur. Old city of Shujabad was protected and made secured against the invaders with the huge and high wall all around the city by the Nawab and founder of the city Shuja Khan. Though the condition of the wall is deteriorating yet it is still in its original position. It was very much planned city at that time. The arrangement of old city is symmetrical. There are four Bazaars within the walled city i.e. Multani Bazaar, Rasheed Shah Bazaar, Rail Bazaar and Chotaka Bazaar on the names of its four respective doors: Railway Gate (open towards railway station), Multani Gate (open towards Multan), Rasheed Shah Gate (having the tomb of Rasheed Shah), Chutaka Gate (as Chutaka means crossing of four roads, four roads going on different directions from this gate). Chandni Chowk is the center of all Bazaars. In the ancient time, all the gates were locked at night. Only little outlets were being used for in coming and outgoing. Shujabad is also very famous due to the presence of saints. Rasheed Shah was a very famous Dervish (Sufi saint) of the Shujabad region and his dargah (Sufi shrine) is located within the walled city. Shujaabad is famous for its mangoes as well.

== Political representation ==
For National Assembly and Provisional Assembly

- NA-158
- PP-221
- PP-222
- PP-223

== Geography and climate ==
The city is located in southern Punjab at almost the exact center of Pakistan. The area around the city is flat, fertile land. The very hot weather of this region makes it ideal for agriculture. There are many canals providing water for cultivation in the region for the growth of crops such as cotton, wheat, and mangoes. The average temperature, during summer, is about 46 °C (115 °F), and in the winter about 4 °C (39 °F). Dusty winds blow in the summer. Mango trees, palms/cotton/wheat / simplicity / near to nature lifestyle / is a very important qualities.

== Demographics ==
Population

Historical population

Year	Pop.	±% p.a.
1951	14,601	—
1961	16,815	+1.42%
1972	24,422	+3.45%
1981	37,810	+4.98%

Year	Pop.	±% p.a.
1998	57,409	+2.49%
2017	80,098	+1.77%
2023	151,115	+11.16%

According to 2023 census, Shujabad had a population of 151,115.

=== Language ===
Languages of Shujabad MC (2023 Census)
1. Saraiki (70.3%)
2. Urdu (21.9%)
3. Punjabi (3.80%)
4. Mevati (3.00%)
5. Others (1.00%)

The majority of residents speak, Saraiki, Urdu, Punjabi, Mewati and Haryanvi.

== Economy ==
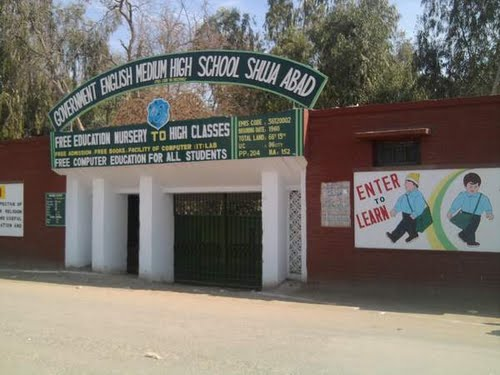
Govt High School Shujabad

Shujabad is an agricultural city due to its hot weather, flat land and irrigation system. The hot weather in the region make it ideal for the growth of crops like cotton, wheat, dates and mangoes. There is one civil hospital and other private hospitals in city. The city has a Court, Police Station, Rescue (1122) and Fire Brigade office.

== Notable people ==
- Shakir Shuja Abadi
- Rana Ijaz Ahmad Noon
