= List of places in Multan =

This is a list of all the notable places in Multan City and its surroundings.

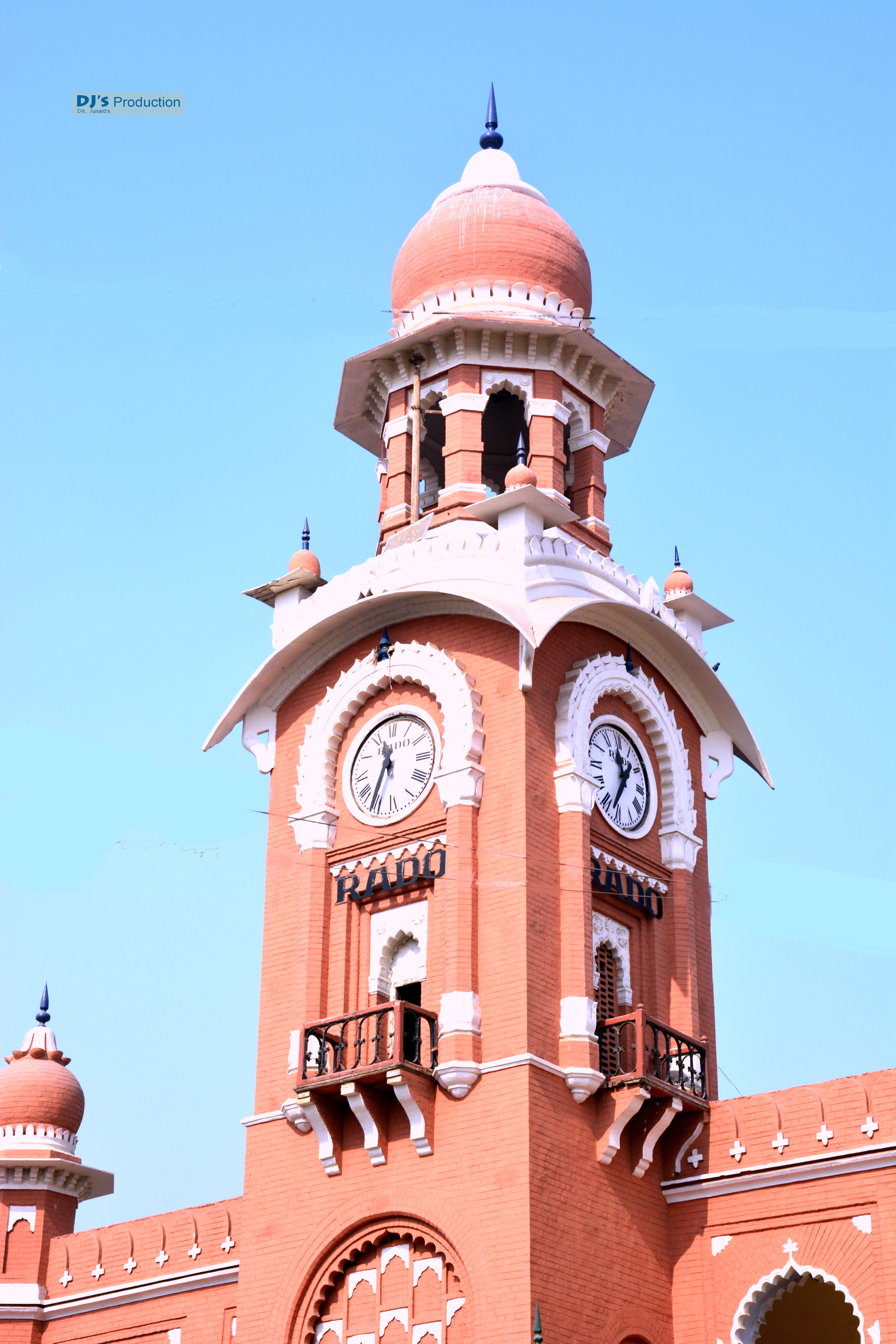
Ghanta Ghar Clock Tower Multan

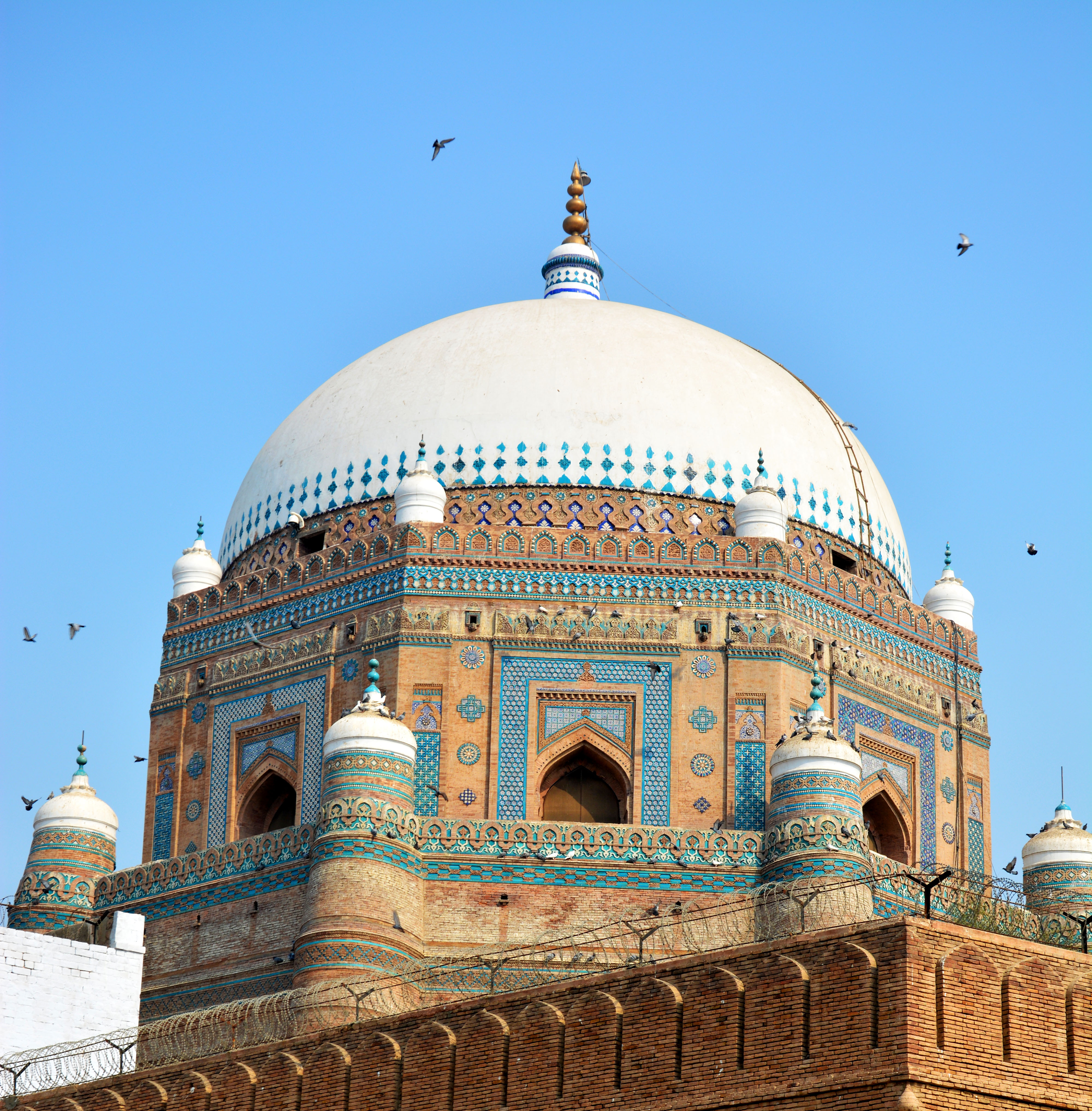
Tomb of Shah Rukn-e-Alam Multan

- Mausoleum of Baha-ud-Din Zakariya
- Mausoleum of Shah Rukn-e-Alam
- Mausoleum of Shah Shams Sabzwari
- Mausoleum of Syed Musa Pak
- Mausoleum of Shah Gardez
- Mausoleum of Mai Maharban (Near Chowk Fawara Multan) is 1000 years old
- Eidgah Mosque
- Old City Multan also called Walled City Multan
- Khooni Burj or Bloody Bastion on Multan City Wall Faseel Multan
- Haram Gate and other gates of Multan
- The City Hall, Multan Municipal Corporation or Clock Tower Multan
- Haram Gate existing old gate of Walled City Multan
- Multan Arts Council building and events
- Multan Fort
- Art Gallery on Damdama of Fort Kohna Multan
- Ibne Qasim Cricket Stadium
- Ruins of Parhaland Temple in Fort Kohna Multan
- Delhi Gate, Multan
- Multan Garrison Mess or Service club MGM 1880 AD in Multan Cantt
- Ruins of Suraj Kund Temple
- Ahmad Shah Abdali's Birthplace Monument
- International Cricket Stadium Multan
- Mausoleum of Akbar shah near (DHA)

New Shah Shams Colony.[Vehari road Multan]

== Monuments ==
- Birthplace of Ahmad Shah Abdali Monument
- Muhammad Bin Qasim Monument
- Monument of Van Agnew Pattrick Alaxander
- Yadgar-i-Shuhada Monument
- Darbar Shah Hussain Sadozai Near Cardiology Center Abdali Road Multan

== Old Gates ==
- Daulat Gate
- Delhi Gate Multan
- Pak Gate Multan
- Haram Gate
- Bohar Gate
- Lohari Gate Multan

== Hospitals ==
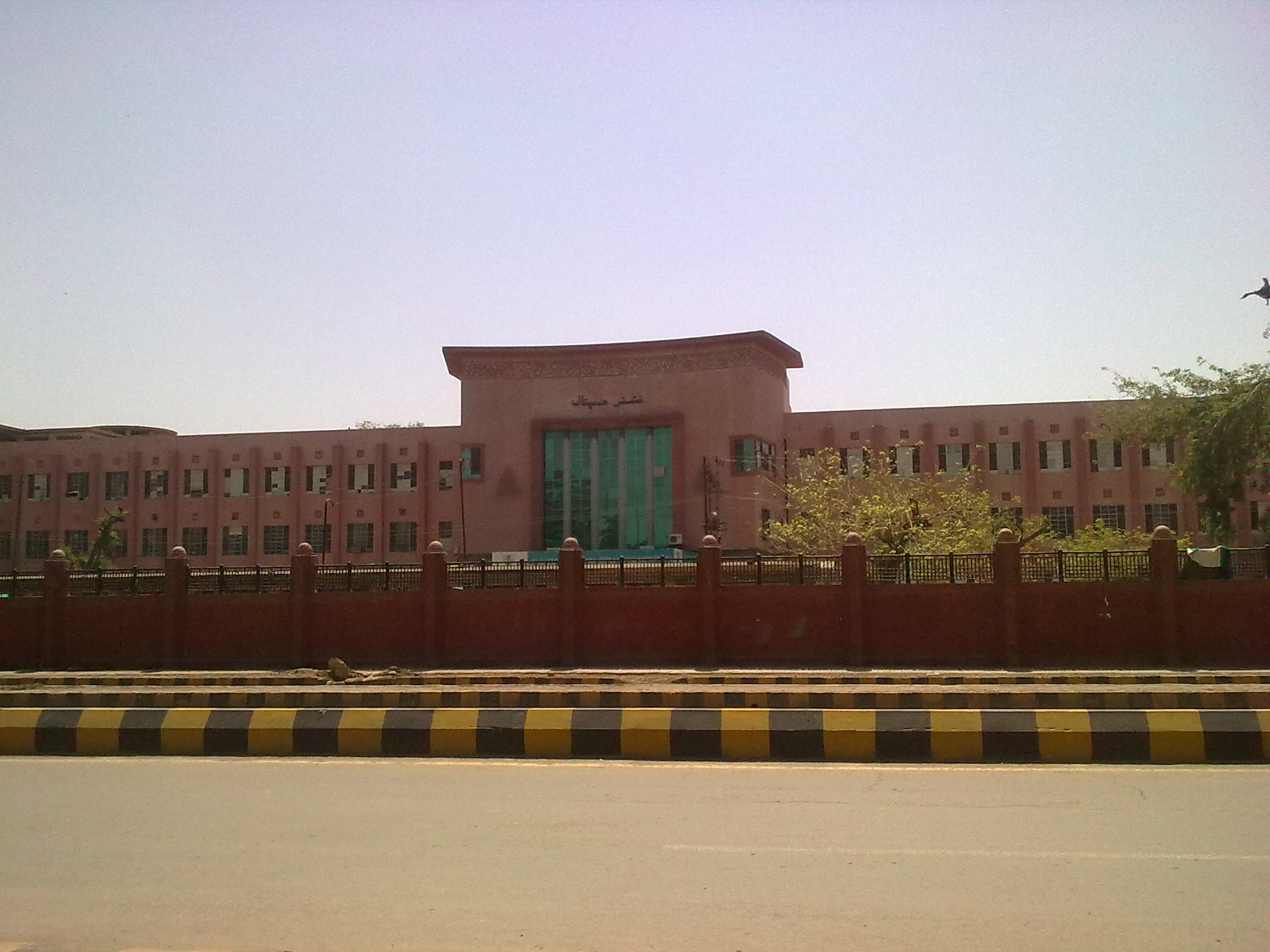
Nishtar Hospital Multan

- Nishtar Hospital Multan (Government hospital)
- Multan Institute of Cardiology (MIC) (Government hospital)
- Civil Hospital Multan (Government hospital)
- Children Complex Multan (Government hospital)
- Nishtar Institute of Dentistry Jail Road
- Burn Unit and Trauma Centre (Government hospital)
- Fatima Jinnah Hospital Ghanta Ghar (Government hospital)
- Combined Military Hospital Multan CMH (Government hospital)
- IBN-E-SIENA HOSPITAL & RESEARCH INSTITUTE
- Shehbaz Sharif General Hospital
- Civil Hospital
- Azeem Hospital Tariq Road
- Al-Aleem Hospital Dehli Gate Multan
- Medicare hospital
- City hospital
- Haleema medical complex
- Bakhtavar amin hospital
- Razia iqbal hospital
- YCDO HOSPITAL Multan

== Colonial Buildings ==
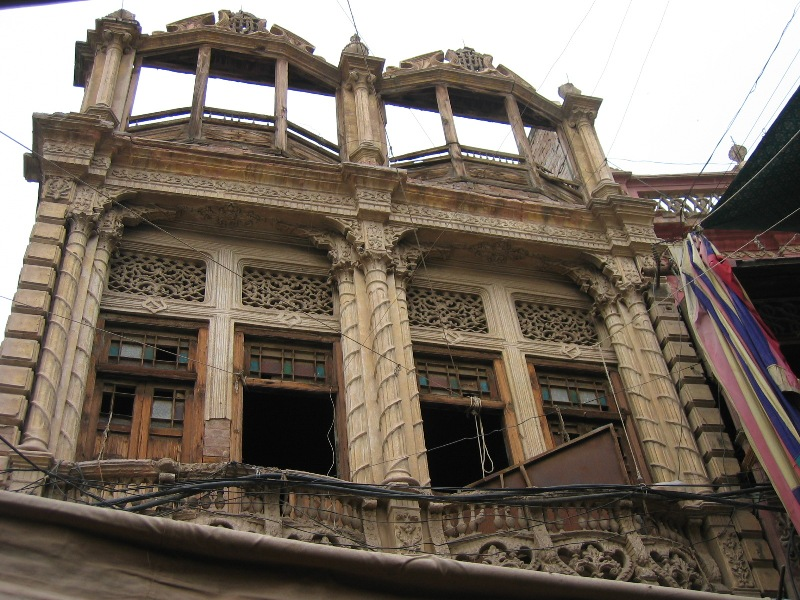
There are various old heritage building still remaining in the old city of Multan

- Ghanta Ghar Multan or Clock Tower Multan
- Memorial Obelisk of Patrick Alexander Vans Agnew in Qasim Bagh commemorating the death of Lt Vans Agnew in 1847 at the hand of the Sikhs
- Civil Hospital Multan
- District Government Buildings

== Historical Forts ==
- Multan Fort or Qilla Kohna, originally called Katochgarh

== Mausoleums ==
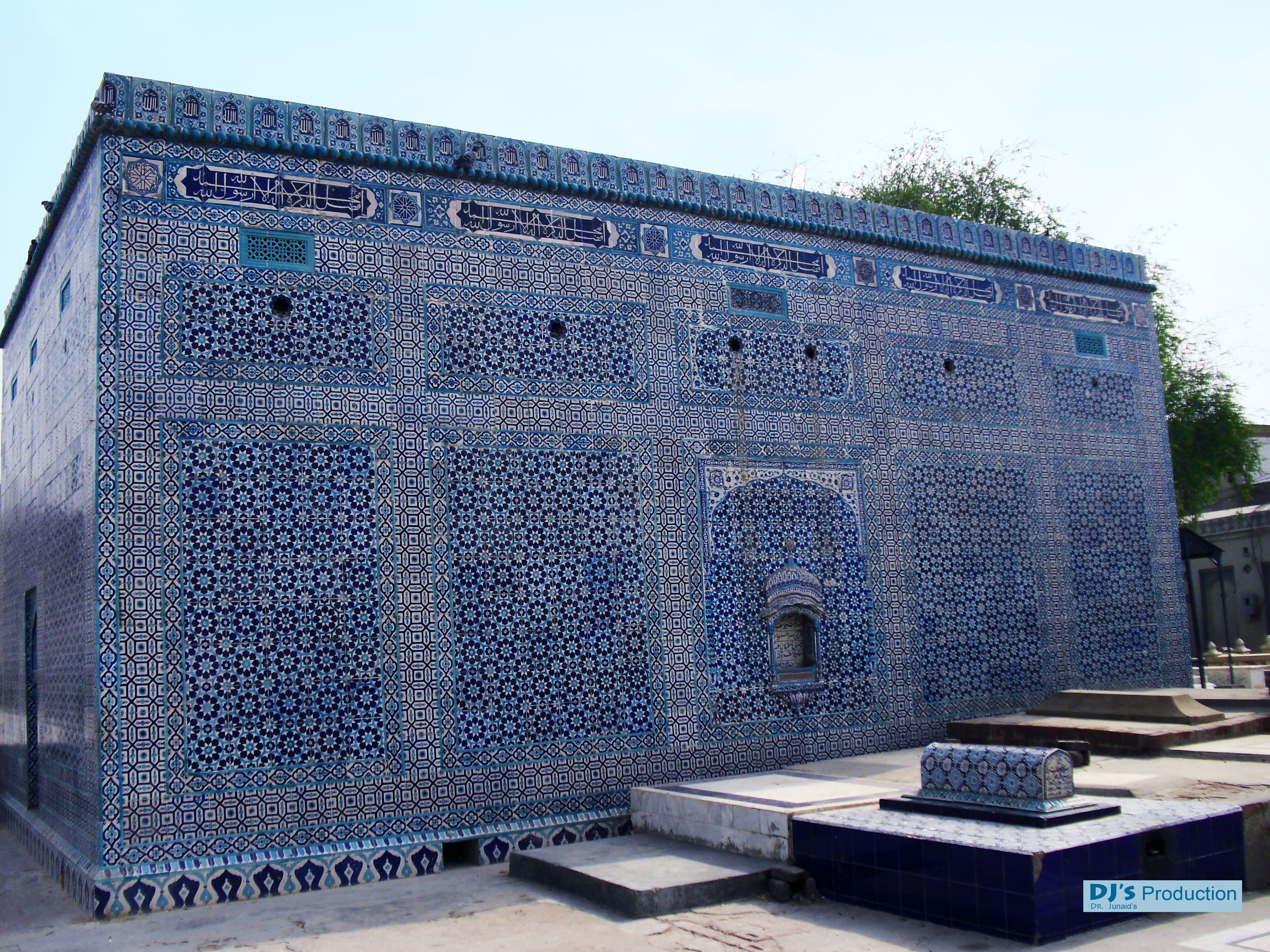
Tomb of Shah Yousuf Gardezi Multan

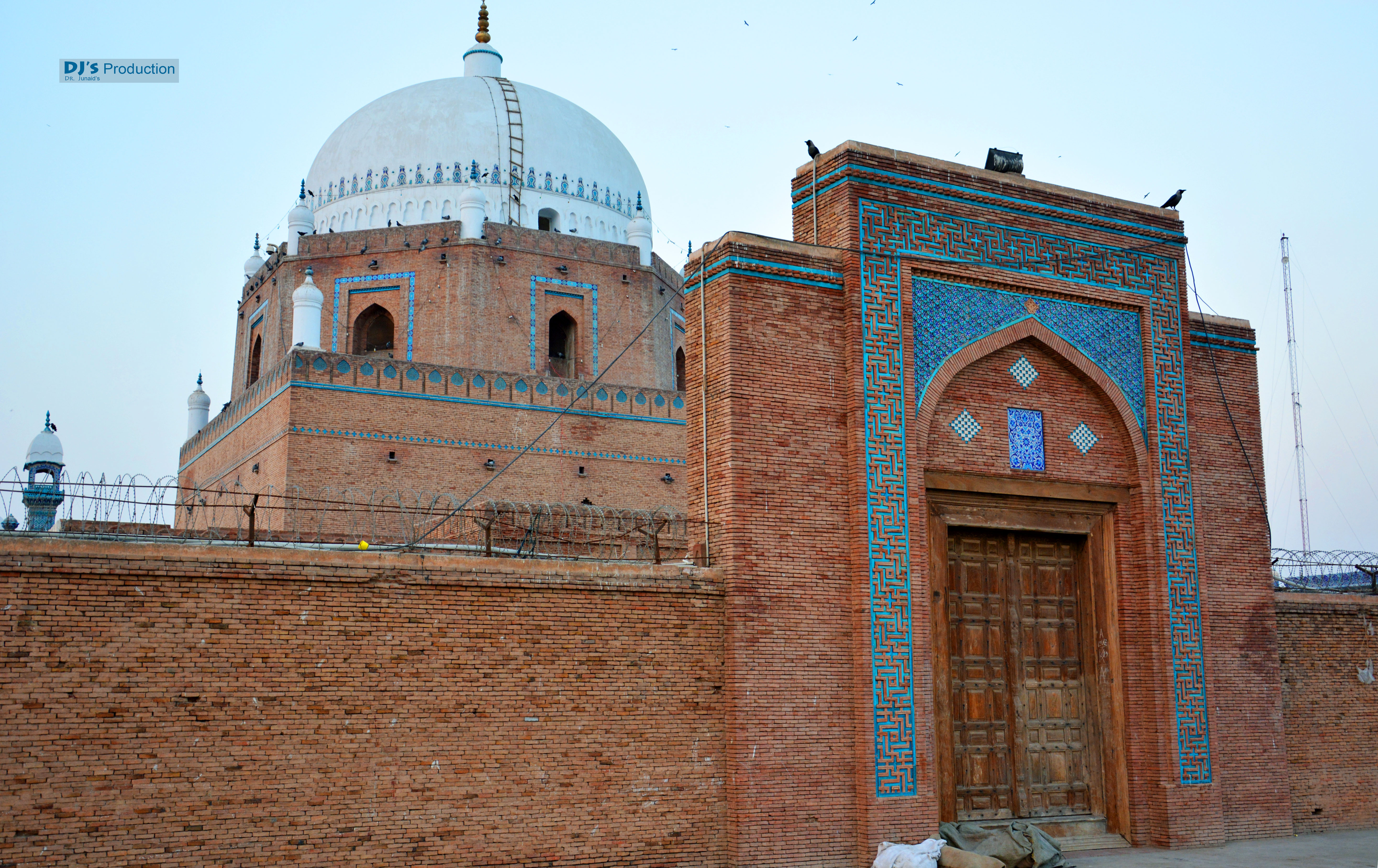
Shrine of Baha-ud-din Zakariya

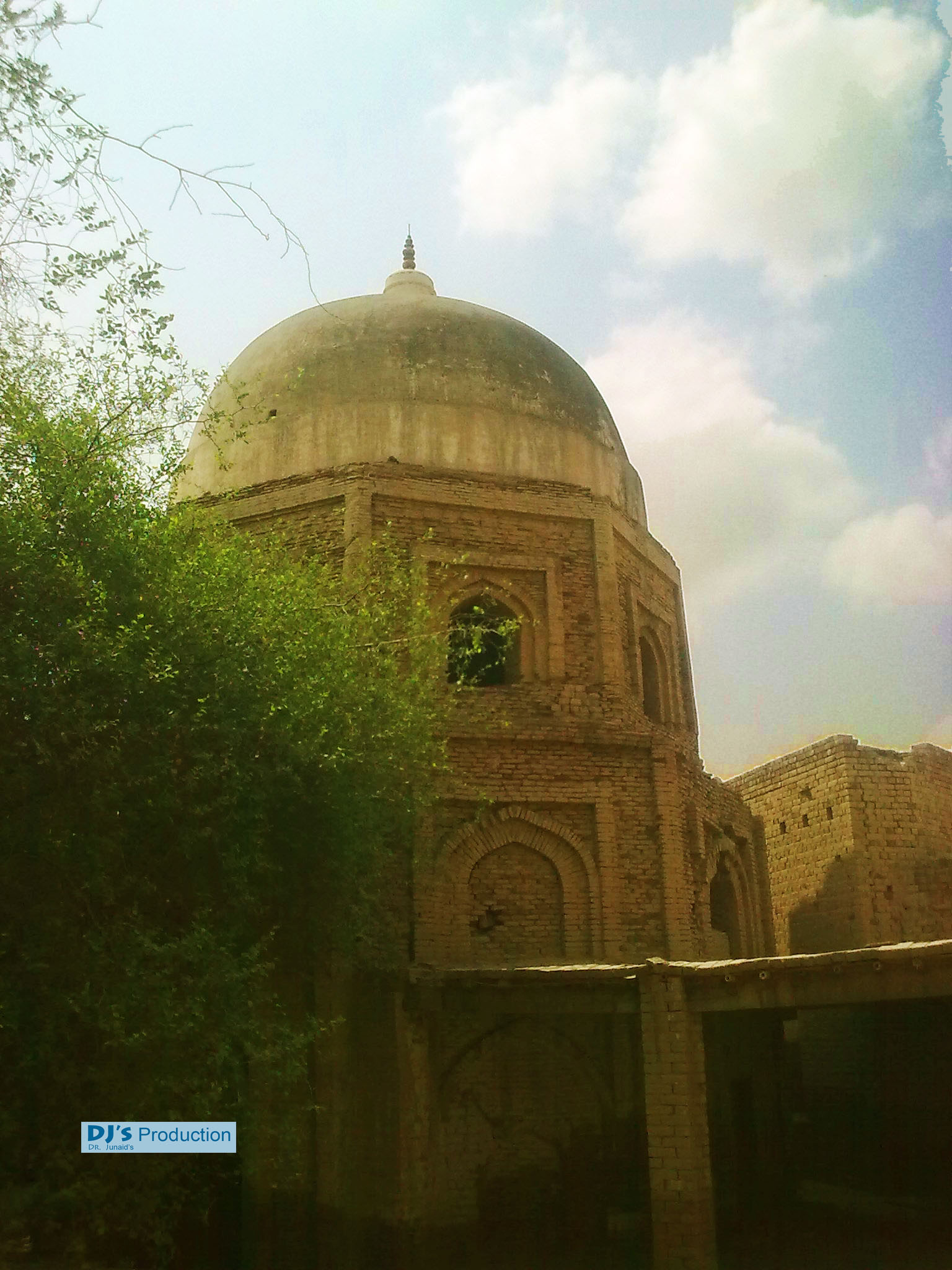
Tomb of Mai Maharban

- Mausoleum of Baha-ud-Din Zakariya
- Mausoleum of Shah Rukn-e-Alam
- Mausoleum of Shah Shams Sabzwari
- Mausoleum of Shah Gardez
- Mausoleum of Syed Musa Pak Shaheed
- Mausoleum of Mai Maharban (Near Chowk Fawara Multan)
- Mausoleum of Hazrat Abbr Shah Warsi (Ashrafabad, Masoom Shah Road)
- Mausoleum of Bibi Pak Daman (Near Basti Daira)
- Mausoleum of Hafiz Muhammad Jamal Multani (Near Aam Khas Bagh)
- Mausoleum of Qari Attaullah Mehrvi (Near Jan-Mohammed chock)
- Mausoleum of Sher Shah Syed (Multan-Mazzaffargarh Road)
- Mausoleum of Hamid Saeed Kazmi
- Mausoleum of Hamid Ali Khan
- Mausoleum of Chadar Wali Sarkar
- Mausoleum of Baba BagaSher
- Shrine of Shahadna Shahaid (Near Delhi Gate)
- Totla Mai (Near Haram Gate)
- Mausoleum of Baba Piran Ghaib (Near Samijabad No1)
- Mausoleum of Shah Ali Akbar Suraj Miani
- Mausoleum of Mother of Shah Ali Akbar Suraj Miani
- Baba Safra (Near Eidgah)
- Mausoleum of Sultan Peer Katal Jalalapur Pirwala, Multan
- Mausoleum of Sheikh Ismail Mouza umerpur Jalalpur Pirwala, Multan
- Mausoleum of Baba cyclon waley Baba Safra (Near Eidgah)
- Mausoleum of Pir sain Raksha Shareef
- Nuagaza tombs
- Manka
- Dargah Khawaja Ghullam Rabbani
- Darbar Shah Hussain Sadozai Near Cardiology Center Abdali Road Multan.

== Museums ==
- Multan Museum
- Government College Museum

== Mosques ==
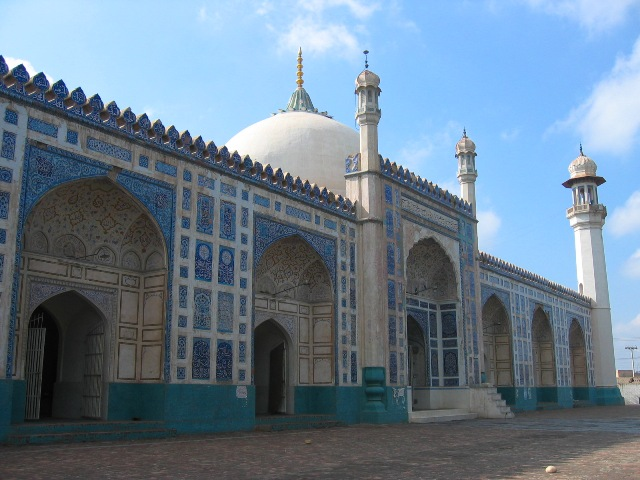
King's Mosque (also referred as Eid Gah Mosque)

- Jamia Masjid Ghousia
- Masjid Al-Khair
- Jamia Zia-ul-Aloom
- Sawi Mosque
- Mosque of Ali Muhammad Khan
- Masjid Phool Hathan
- Eid Gah Mosque
- Masjid Sardar Mohammad
- Mosque Ahmed Shah Abdali
- Mosque Khalil
- Masjid Sameja Wali, Jamal Pura Colony
- Baqarabad Mosque New Multan
- Jalal masjid Gulgasht
- Bilal Masjid Qasim Bela
- Laal mosque of Shalimar colony
- Laal Mosque Cantt
- Mosque Muhammad Bin Qasim, Qila Quhna(First mosque of the Subcontinent)
- Eid Gah Mosque cantt
- Dera Adda Mosque
- Masjid Seith Abu Muhammad cantt
- Masjid Wazir Khan Multan

== Temples ==
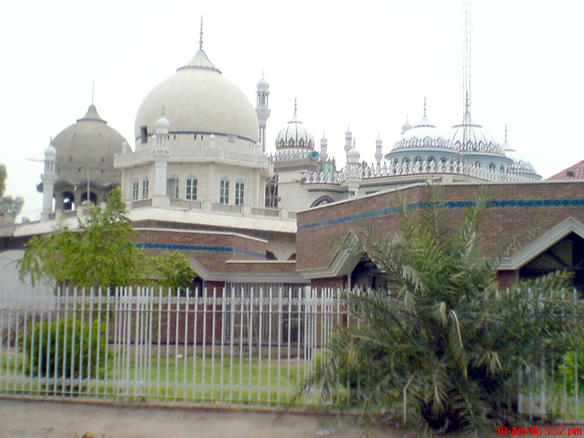
Mizar Mubark Moulana Hamid Ali Khan Sahib located in central Multan

- Parhaland Temple in Fort Kohna Multan
- Sun Temple Multan
- Suraj Kund Temple in Suraj Kund area of Multan
- Jain Mandir in Bohar Gate
- Mandir Shah Majeed inside Bohar Gate

== Church ==
- St Mary's Cathedral
- Cathedral of the Holy Redeemer
- Christ Church Multan
- Full Gospel Church Multan
- Multan Cathedral Cantt

== Sports ==
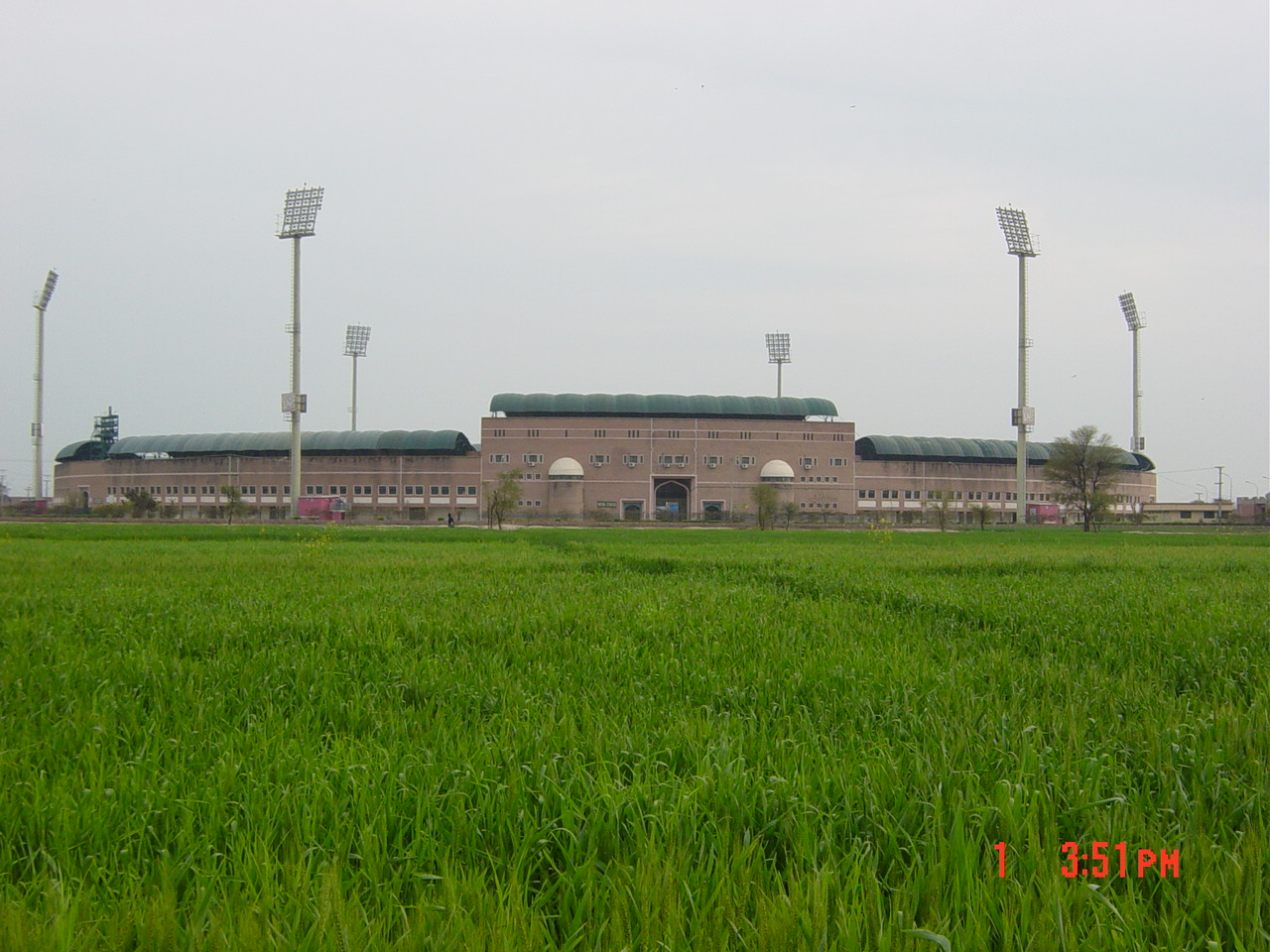
A view of Multan cricket stadium from outside

- Multan Cricket Stadium
- Sports Ground
- MCC Ground
- Qasim Bagh Stadium
- Ayub Stadium
- CMH Sports Ground
- Polo Ground Fort Colony
- Railway Ground
- Biliwala Cricket Ground

== Notable Intersections ==
Intersections on major roads become busy markets. These are called chowk.

- Ghanta Ghar Chowk
- Chungi No. 9 Chowk
- BCG Chowk Mumtazabad
- Chowk Kumharanwala or Jinnah Chowk or Gadaffi Chowk
- Chowk khuni burj
- Vihari Chowk
- Bahawalpur Chowk
- Ali Chowk
- Nagshah Chowk
- Bilal Chowk
- MDA Chowk
- Bomanji Chowk Cantt
- S.P Chowk
- Kalma Chowk
- Dera Adda Hassan Parwana Chowk
- Nishter Chowk
- Chowk Pul Barara
- Chungi No.1 Chowk
- Chowk Mumtazabad
- Chowk Kumharan Wala
- Chowk Rasheed Abad

== Flyovers in Multan ==
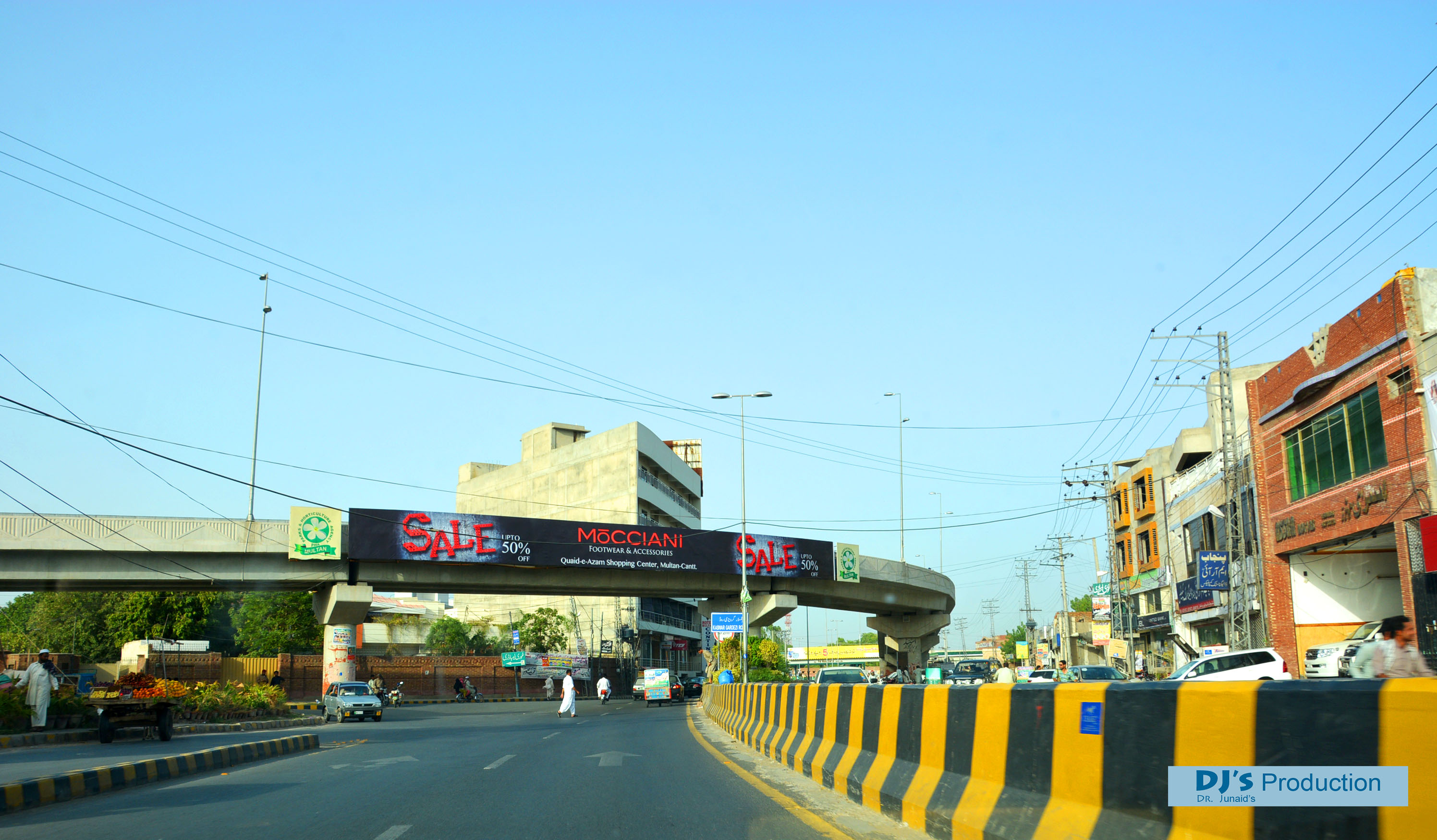
Nishtar Chowk Flyover Multan

- Chowk Kumharanwala Level II Flyover (Grade Separated)
- Yousuf Raza Gillani Flyover (Longest Flyover in Multan with three extra ramps)
- Pul Mauj Darya Kachehry Chowh Flyover
- Nishter Hospital Flyover
- Kalma Chowk Flyover
- Rasheedabad Chowk Flyover
- Chowk Nagshah Flyover
- Chungi No.9 Flyover
- Railway Flyover Double Phatak

== Cemeteries ==
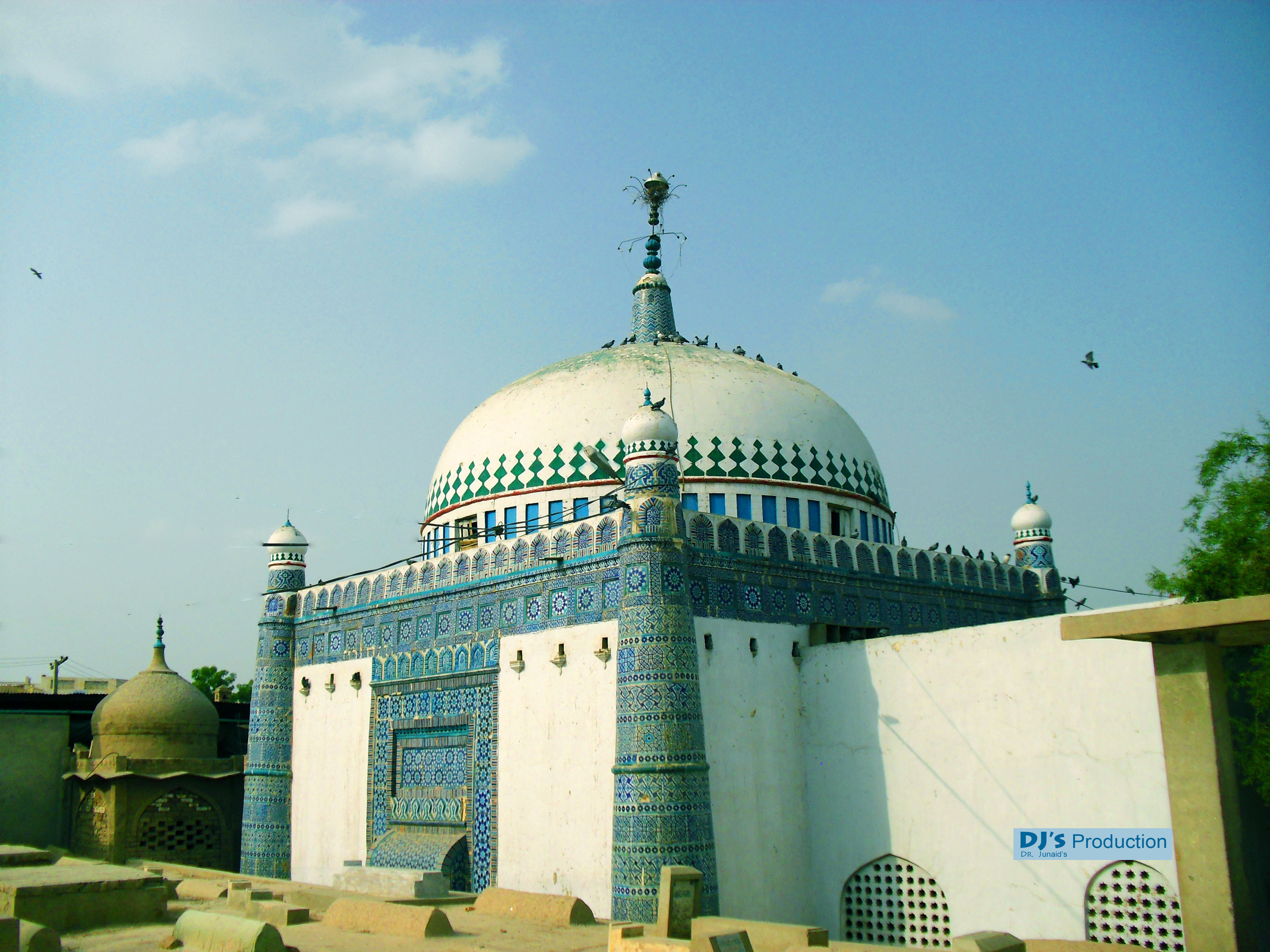
Shrine of Khawaja Awais Kagha

- Haji Baghdadi Graveyard
- Chungi No 14 Graveyard
- Hassan Parwana Graveyard
- Peer Umer Graveyard
- Baba Piran Ghaib Graveyard
- Kotla Waris Shah Graveyard
- Zahid Shah Graveyard
- Masoom Shah Road Graveyard
- Nishtar Graveyard
- Pak Mai Graveyard
- Christian Graveyard
- Central Graveyard
- Sakhi Sultan Ali Akbar Graveyard
- Qasimpur Graveyard
- Wapda Graveyard
- Model Town Graveyard
- Basti Nau Graveyard
- Punjab Govt Servants Housing Foundation
- BZU Graveyard
- Kanak Mandi Graveyard
- Rajput Graveyard]l
- Bhutta Graveyard
- Timber Market Graveyard
- Dera Basti Graveyard

== Markets ==
=== Bazars ===
- Saddar Bazar
- Chowk Bazar
- Chori Bazar
- Sarafa Market
- Chori Sarai Bazar
- Hussain Agahi Bazar
- Purana Shujabat Road Bazar
- Loha Market
- Sabzi Mandi
- Bakar Mandi
- Jafar Bazar
- Gardezi Market
- Chungi No 14 Bazar
- Red Area Market
- Gulshan Market
- Gulgusht Market

∗ Samijabad Market

∗ Suraj Miani Bazar

=== Trade Centers ===
- Multan Trade Centre
- PARACHA INTERIORS COLLECTION (Multan Cantt)
- Prince Departmental Store Multan Cantt.
- Awami Departmental Store, Hussain Agahi
- Chenone Tower
- Bomanji Square
- The United Mall
- New Chase up
- Metro Plaza
- Siddique Trade Center
- Khan Trade Center
- Mall Plaza
- Rehma Center
- City Center (Under-developing)
- Fashion Mall (Under-developing
- The Mall of Multan (Under-developing)
- The Crystal Mall (Under-developing)
- The Sharif Complex

• Buch executive villas • The Grand

== Parks and Gardens ==
- Cantonment Garden
- Shah Shams Park
- Chaman Zar Askari Lake (Jheel)
- Jinah Park (Shah Rukn-e-Alam Colony)
- Faisal Mukhtar Park
- Jinnah Water Park
- Joyland Water Park
- Qasim Bagh
- CSD Park
- Lalak Jaan Park Cantt
- Salahuddin Doger Park
- Gondal Park Double Phatak
- Jalal Park Gulgasht

=== Chenab Park ===
Chenab Park is situated at Muzaffargarh Road, near east bank of the River Chenab in Multan, Pakistan. There is also another park on the west side of the river called Chenab Kinara Park (Chenab Bank) on the Muzaffargarh side. There are play areas for children, a lake and boating facilities in the park.

== Plants Nurseries ==
- Faiz-e-aam Nursery Multan.
- The Garden Shop Eidgah Chowk Multan.

== See also ==
- List of roads in Multan
- List of places in Lahore
- List of places in Faisalabad
