= Mausoleums of Multan =

List of mausoleums in Multan, Pakistan

The city of Multan, Punjab, Pakistan has many mausoleums and shrines, due to its rich heritage of pirs and saints.

== Tomb of Baha ud-Din Zakaria ==
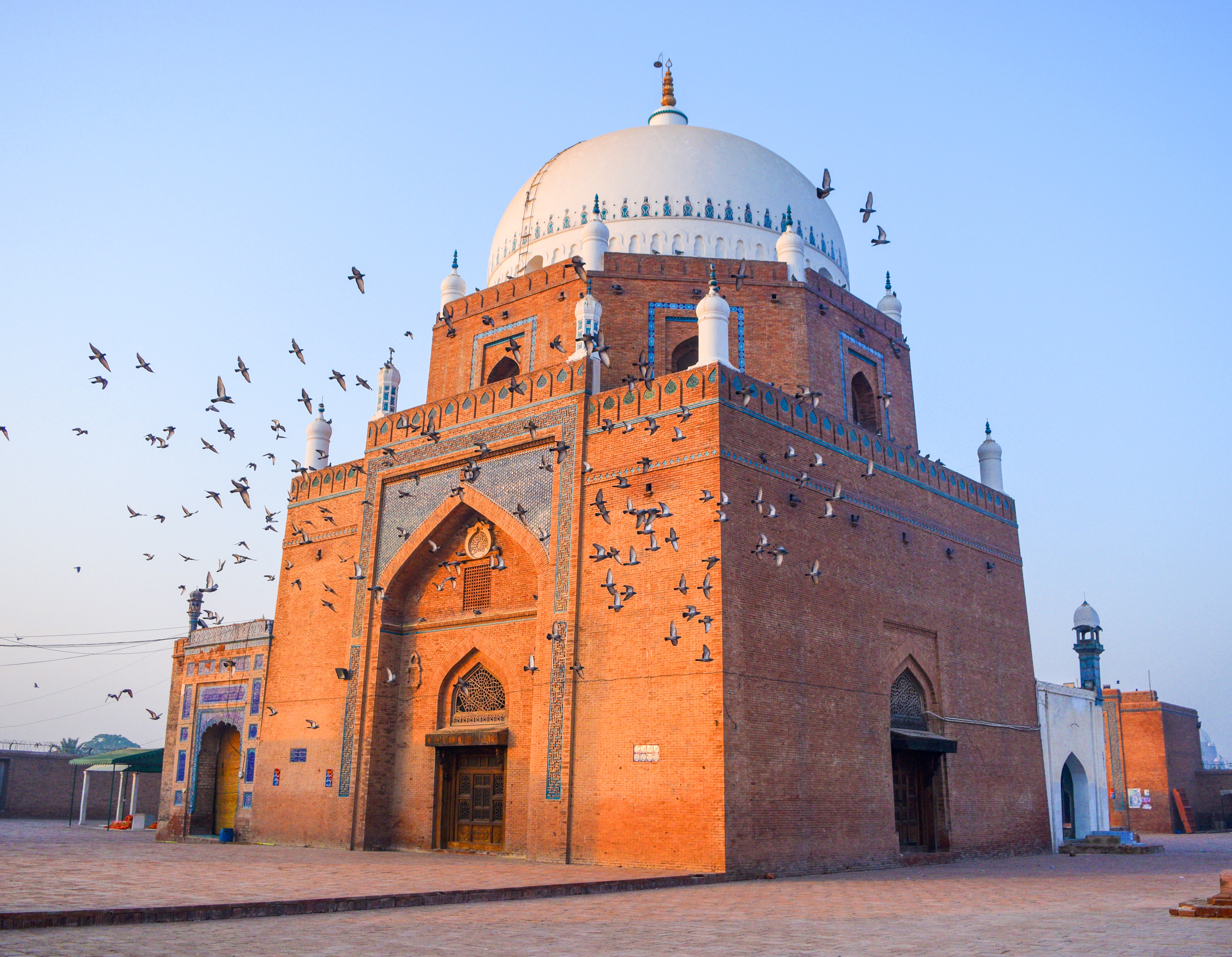
Mausoleum of Baha ud-Din Zakaria

At the north-eastern fringe of the former Multan Fort is the mausoleum of Bahauddin Zakariya, considered one of the most significant saints of the Suhrawardiyya Sufi order or tariqa, and a distinguished disciple of Shahab al-Din Suhrawardi.

Bahauddin Zakariya was born at Kot Karor (Karor Lal Esan), a town in Layyah District near Multan, around 1170. For 30 years, he traveled to different cities in order to preach Islam and eventually settled in Multan in 1222. He died in 1267. The Mausoleum is a square of 51 feet 9 inches (15.77 m), measured internally. Above this is an octagon, about half the height of the square, which is surmounted by a hemispherical dome. The Mausoleum was almost completely ruined during the siege of Multan by the British in 1848, but was soon afterwards restored.

== Tomb of Shah Rukn-e-Alam ==
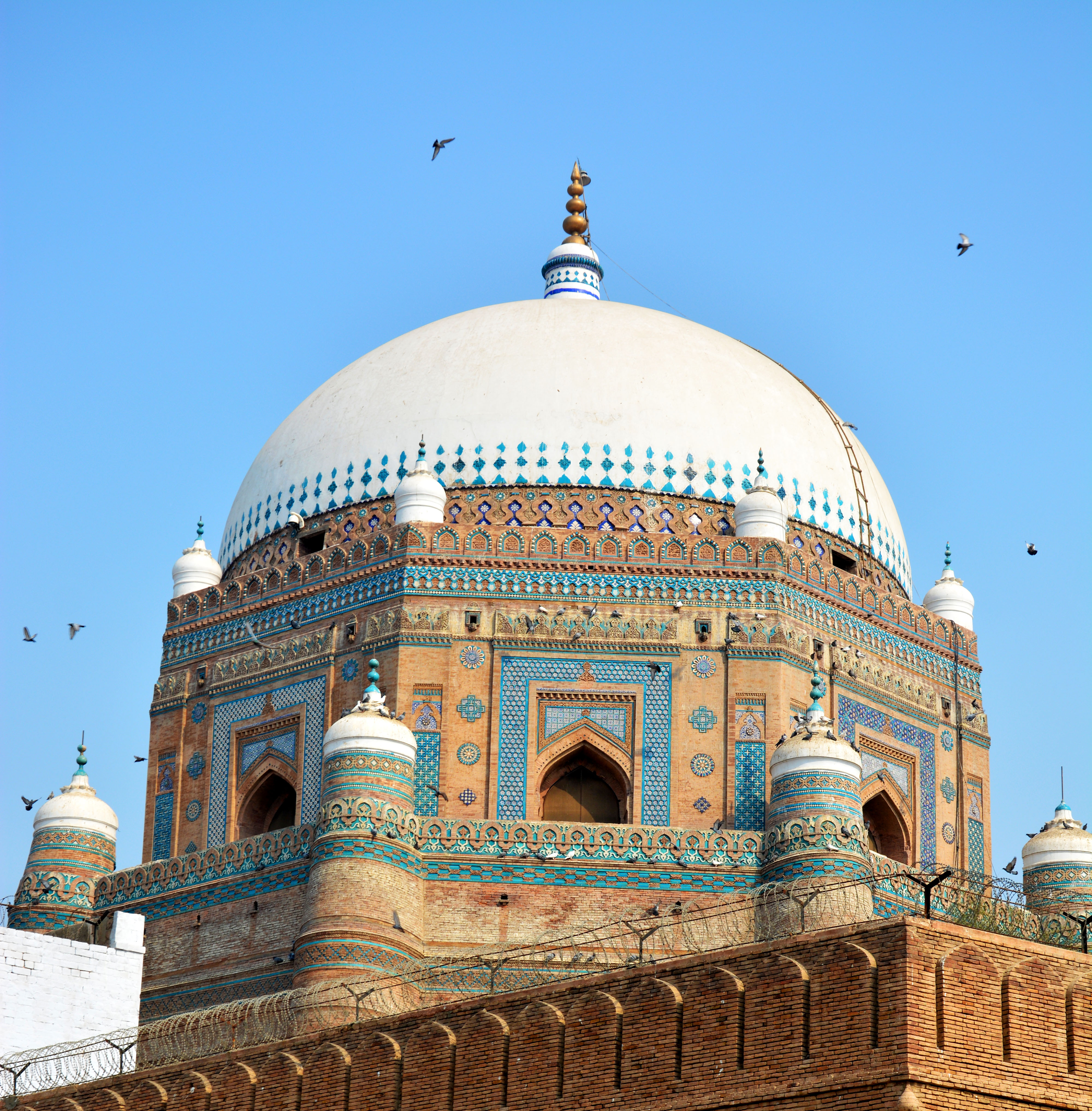
Tomb of Shah Rukn-e-Alam Multan

The tomb of Shah Rukn-e-Alam, grandson of Shaikh Bahauddin Zakaria, was built between 1320 and 1324, is one of best surviving examples of Tughlaq architecture. Located on a hilltop, it is visible from miles away. The tomb is located on the southwest side of the fort. This building is an octagon, 51 feet 9 inches (15.77 m) in diameter internally, with walls 41 feet 4 inches (12.60 m) high and 13 feet 3 inches (4.04 m) thick, supported at the angles by sloping towers. Over this is a smaller octagon 25 feet 8 inches (7.82 m), on the exterior side, and 26 feet 10 inches (8.18 m) high, leaving a narrow passage all round the top of the lower story for the moazzan, or public caller to prayers. The whole is topped by a hemispherical dome of 58 feet (18 m) external diameter. The total height of the building, including a plinth of 3 feet (0.91 m), is 100 feet (30 m). As it stands on the high ground, the total height above the road level is 150 feet.

Besides its religious importance, the mausoleum is also of considerable archaeological value as its dome is reputed to be the second largest in South Asia after Gol Gumbaz in Bijiapur, India. The mausoleum is built entirely of red brick, bounded with beams of shisham wood, which have now turned black after so many centuries. The whole of the exterior is ornamented with glazed tile panels, string courses and battlements. Colors used are dark blue, azure, and white, contrasted with deep red polished bricks. The tomb was reportedly built by Ghiyath al-Din Tughluq for himself, but was gifted by his son Muhammad bin Tughluq to Rukn-e-Alam, when he died in 1330.

== Tomb of Shams ud-Din Multani ==
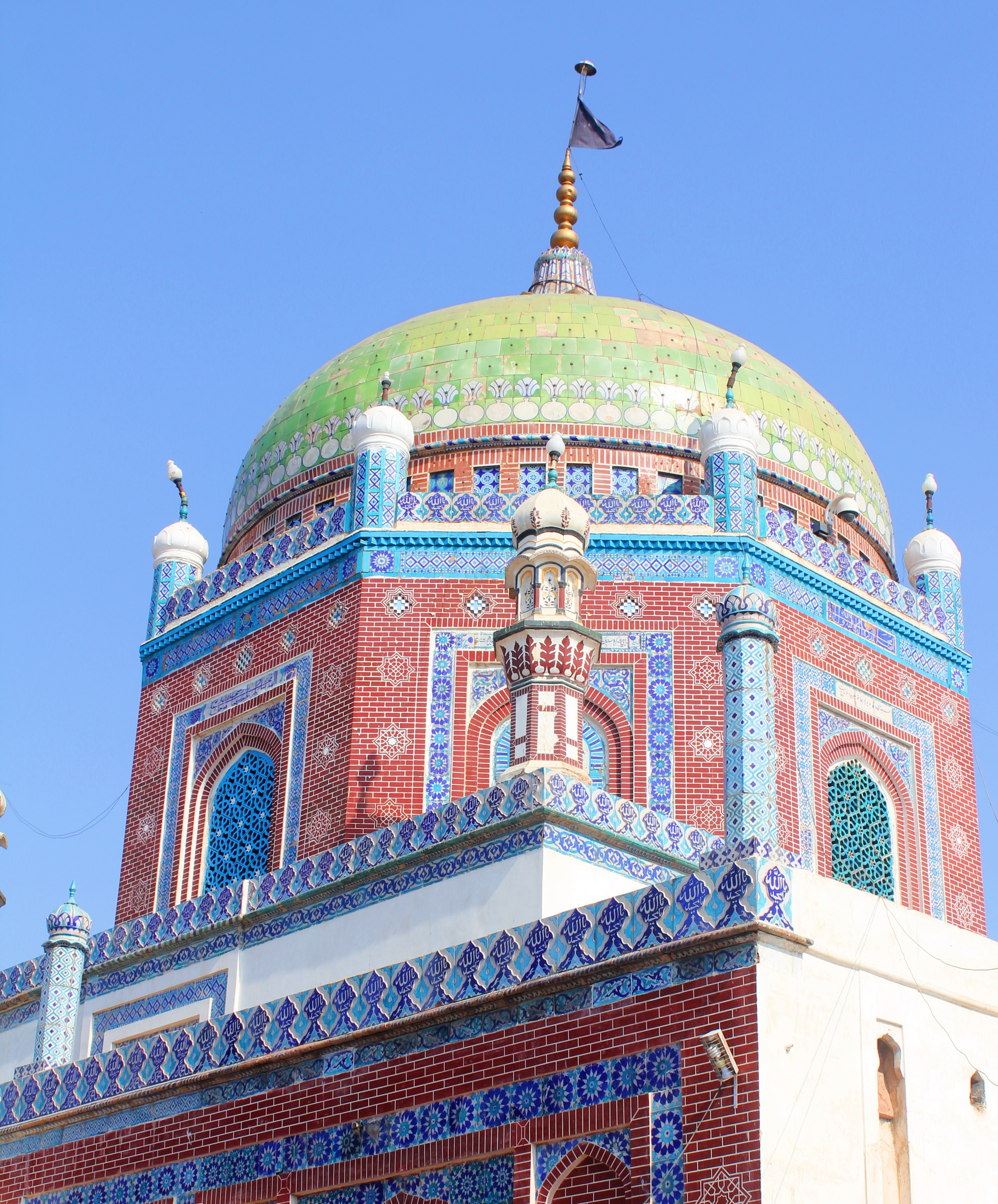
The shrine of Shamsuddin Multani

The mausoleum of Shamsuddin Multani is located about half a mile to the east of the fort, on the high bank of the old bed of the Ravi River near Aam Khas Garden. Multani was born in 1165 and died in 1276. The shrine was built by his grandson in 1330. The tomb is square, 30 feet (9.1 m) in height surmounted by a hemispherical dome. It is decorated with ornamental glazed tiles.

== Tomb of Shah Gardez ==
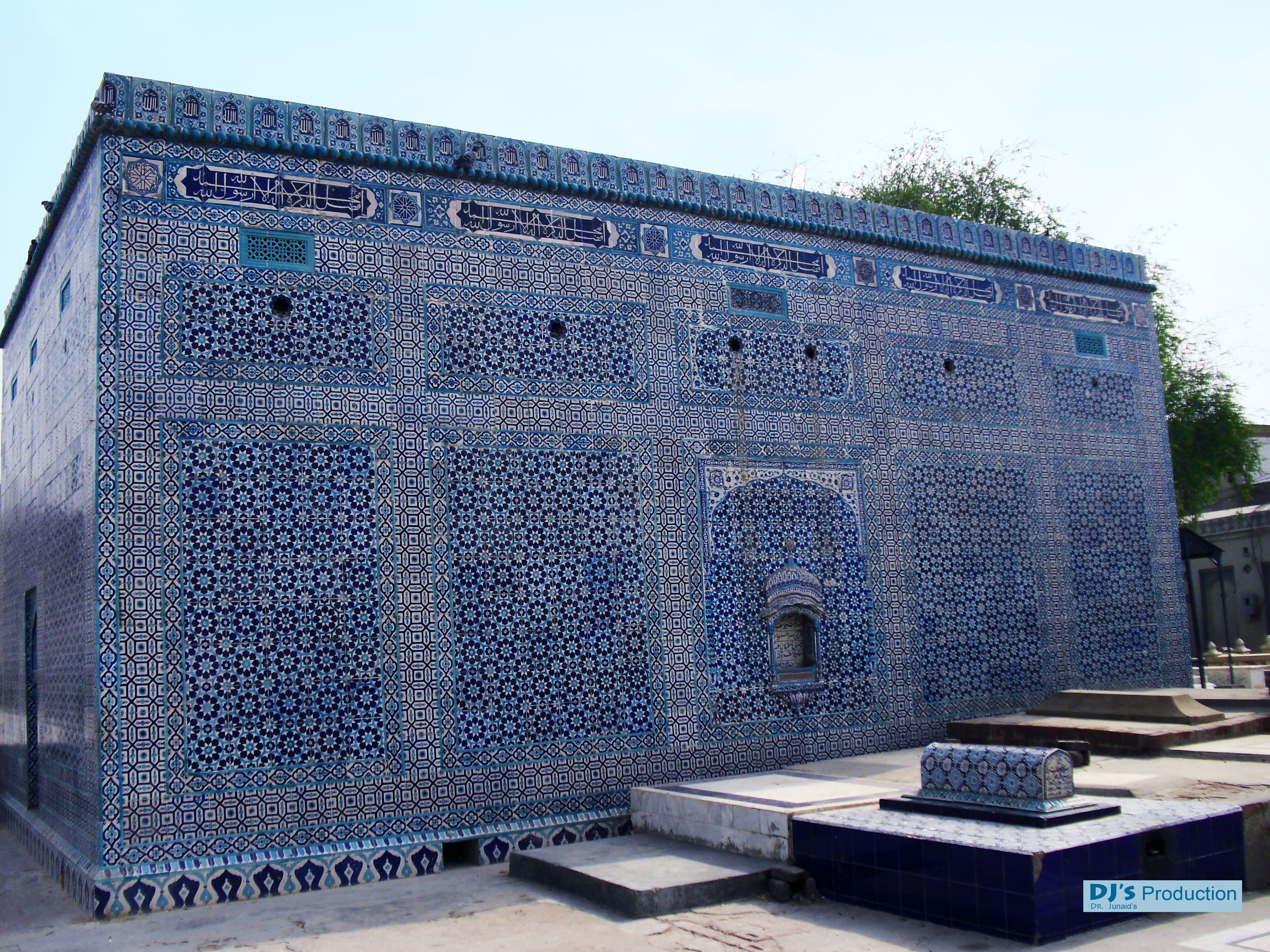
Tomb of Shah Yousuf Gardezi in Multan

Thd shrine of Muhammad Shah Yousuf Gardezi, commonly known as Shah Gardez, is located just inside the Bohar Gate. It is a rectangular domeless building decorated with glazed tiles. Shah Gardez reportedly arrived in Multan in 1088 and revitalized the then-moribund city. He is credited with converting many people to Islam. His descendants are known as Gardezis and are one of the few old noble families in the country.

== Tomb of Musa Pak Shaheed ==
The mausoleum of Syed Musa Pak is inside the Pak Gate. He was a descendant of Abdul Qadir Jillani and was born in Uch.

== Tomb of Hafiz Jamal Multani ==
The mausoleum is situated near Aam Khas Garden outside Daulat Gate, Multan. The tomb has been built within a wall resembling a fortification. The tomb lies on a platform of marble and is surrounded by an area paved with marble and black slate. On the north and west side there is an arched corridor which looks like a tunnel. On the south side there is an extensive assembly hall, whose timber roof is embellished with decorative work.

Hafiz Jamal died at the age of 66 on 7 May 1811. A chronogram for the date of his death was derived by his pupil Munshi Ghulam Hassan from these words of Holy Qur'an: "innl muttaqin fi jannat". Two other chronograms in Persian verses are also inscribed over the eastern gate of the tomb. Hafiz Jamal married twice and one of his wives was from Laang family. He had a considerable number of spiritual successors such as Khwaja Khuda Bakhsh of Khairpur Tamiwali.

== Tomb of Shah Ali Akbar ==
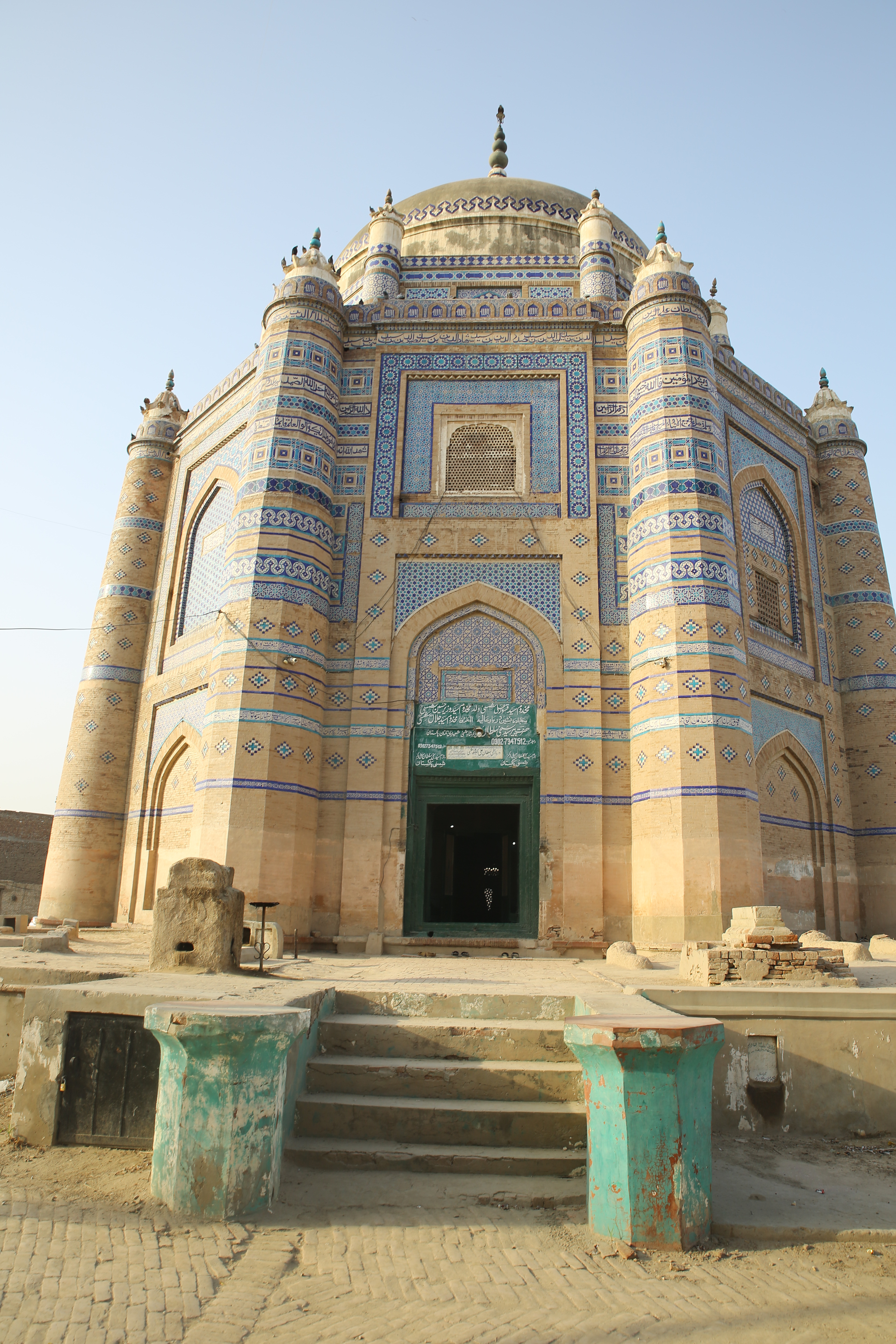
Tomb of Shah Ali Akbar and nearby mosque.

Shah Ali Akbar was a grandson of Shah Shamsuddin Multani. His mausoleum is situated in Shia Miani, Multan.

== Other mausoleums and tombs ==
In addition to the tombs mentioned above, Multan has several other historical shrines, some of which are:

- The mausoleum of Bibi Pak Daman is located near Basti Daira.
- Mausoleum of Sher Shah Syed is on Multan-Mazzaffargarh Road.
- Mausoleum of Makhdoom Abdul Rashid Haqqani is at Makhdoom Rashid Road.

The long brick tombs are generally known as nuagaza tombs, or the "nine-yarder tombs". This term is generally applied in the sub-continent to the warriors and martyrs of Islam who fell in action against the Hindus at the time of the early invasions of the Muslims.

Outside the Delhi Gate, nearly twelve yards in length, there is a stone of chocolate color with marks of light yellow on it, 27 inches (69 cm) in diameter and 78 inches (200 cm) thick, with a hole through the middle 9 inches (23 cm) in diameter. It is called Manka. The tomb is asserted to be 1300 years old. It is possible that it may belong to the times of the early Muslim invasion under Mohammad bin Qasim.

Chisht Nagar is a Shrine of a great saint Maulana Ghulam Rabbani Ramdasi Chishti Sabri (1918–1988) near Jahanian Mandi, Multan.

== See also ==
- List of mausolea
- List of mausolea and shrines in Pakistan
- List of cemeteries
- List of cemeteries in Pakistan
