= Mai Maharban =

Saint

Coordinates: 30°11′47″N 71°27′47″E

Mai Maharban (1140 AD) is one of female saints of Multan who is famous for her pious nature and she was the wife of one Shaikh Hasan who is said to have come to Multan shortly after the time of Shah Gardez.

== Tomb of Mai Maharban ==
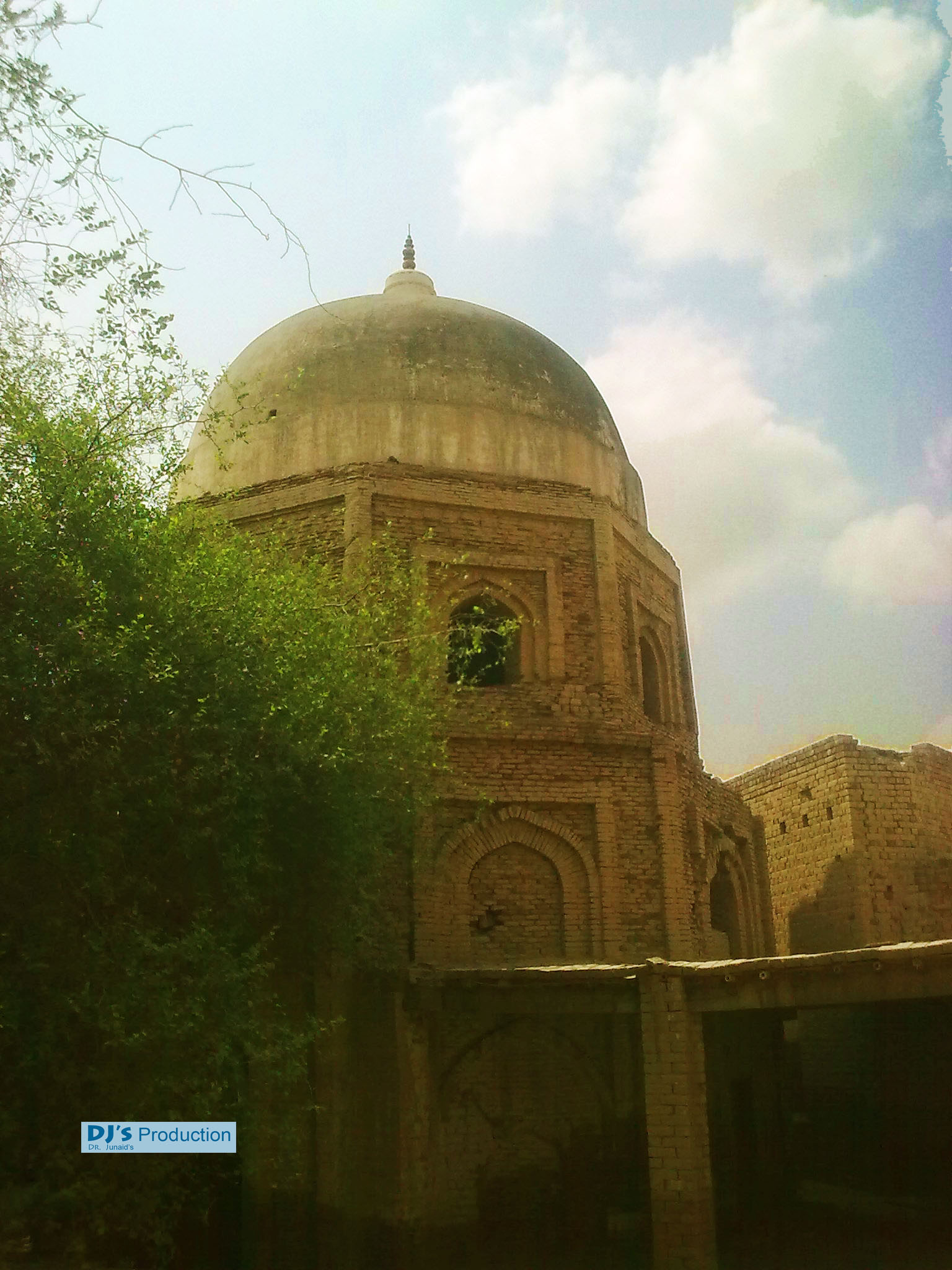
Tomb of Mai Maharban

It is located Chowk Fawara Multan near Children Complex Multan on Abdali Road not far from Ghanta Ghar (Multan). It is very old structure (probably oldest living structure in Multan). If date of its construction 1140 A.D. is accepted the lady becomes a contemporary of Shah Yousaf Gardezi who died in 1136 A.D. However construction of the building is a 13th-century structure.
