= Alamdar Hussain Gilani =

Pakistani politician (1919–1978)

Syed Alamdar Hussain Gilani
- سید علمدار حسین گیلانی

Provincial Minister, Government of Punjab
- In office 1953–1958

Member, Punjab Legislative Assembly
- In office 1951–1955

Member, Second Constituent Assembly of Pakistan
- In office 1955–1958

Federal Minister of State for Power and Works
- In office 1958–1958

Personal details
- Born: Syed Abul Hassan; 12 December 1919 Multan, Punjab, British India
- Died: 9 August 1978 (aged 58) Multan, Punjab, Pakistan
- Resting place: Shrine of Musa Pak Shaheed, Multan
- Party: All-India Muslim League (before 1947); Pakistan Muslim League
- Children: Includes Yusuf Raza Gilani and Ahmed Mujtaba Gilani
- Relatives: Ali Haider Gilani (grandson); Jalil Abbas Jilani (nephew)
- Education: Emerson College, Multan

Syed Alamdar Hussain Gilani (Urdu: سید علمدار حسین گیلانی; 12 December 1919 – 9 August 1978) was a Pakistani politician from Multan associated with the All-India Muslim League and, after the Partition of 1947, the Pakistan Muslim League. He served as a member of the Punjab Legislative Assembly from 1951 to 1955, held provincial ministerial portfolios in the cabinet of Feroz Khan Noon, sat in the Second Constituent Assembly of Pakistan from 1955 to 1958, and was briefly federal Minister of State for Power and Works in 1958. He was the father of the former Prime Minister of Pakistan Yusuf Raza Gilani.

== Early life and family ==
Gilani was born on 12 December 1919 in the walled city of Multan, then in the Punjab Province of British India. According to a memoir by his son, he was given the name Syed Abul Hassan at birth and subsequently adopted the name Alamdar Hussain, a reference to the month of Muharram.

He belonged to the Gilani family of Multan, a local Sayyid lineage associated with the Sufi tradition and the shrine of Sheikh Syed Musa Pak Shaheed. His father, Makhdoom Ghulam Mustafa Shah Gilani, served as a sub-divisional magistrate in the colonial administration and was elected to the Punjab Legislative Assembly in the 1946 provincial elections.

Gilani received his early schooling in Muzaffargarh and Multan, and graduated with a Bachelor of Arts from Emerson College, Multan, in 1941.

In 1948, he married a daughter of Makhdoom Syed Ghulam Meeran Shah Gilani of Rahim Yar Khan. His sons included Yusuf Raza Gilani, later Prime Minister of Pakistan, and the Punjab Assembly member Ahmed Mujtaba Gilani.

== Political career ==
=== Pakistan Movement ===
Gilani joined the All-India Muslim League as a student. He has been identified as one of the signatories of the Pakistan Resolution adopted at Minto Park, Lahore, on 23 March 1940.

The family's residence on Sooraj Kund Road in Multan was reportedly used for Muslim League gatherings, and the memoir by his son records that a League convention was held there during the 1951 Punjab provincial elections in the presence of the then Prime Minister and League president Liaquat Ali Khan.

=== Provincial and federal office ===
Gilani was elected to the Punjab Legislative Assembly in the 1951 provincial elections and served until 1955. In 1953 he was inducted into the provincial cabinet of Feroz Khan Noon with responsibility for health and local government, a portfolio that was subsequently expanded to include public health, buildings and roads.

During his tenure as health minister, a number of public-sector health institutions were established or expanded in the Multan region and elsewhere in West Punjab, including Nishtar Hospital and Medical College in Multan, which opened in this period. His son's memoir additionally credits him with the establishment of district-headquarter hospitals in Multan, Mianwali, Muzaffargarh and Dera Ghazi Khan and with the expansion of Mayo Hospital, Lahore and the Samli Sanatorium near Murree, and records that an LSMF (Licentiate of the State Medical Faculty) medical school was established at Victoria Hospital, Bahawalpur, during the same period. Fazal Ilahi Chaudhry, later President of Pakistan, is reported to have served as his parliamentary secretary in 1953.

Gilani subsequently served in the second Constituent Assembly of Pakistan from 1955 to 1958 and was among the members present at the signing of the Constitution of 1956. He continued to hold the provincial health portfolio in Punjab until 1958, in which year he was briefly appointed federal Minister of State for Power and Works before the change of government later that year.

=== Disqualification and later years ===
Following the 1958 military coup led by Ayub Khan, Gilani was among the politicians disqualified from elective office under the Elective Bodies Disqualification Order (EBDO). He withdrew from active politics and, according to his son's account, devoted subsequent years to educational and religious affairs in Multan through the Anjuman-e-Islamia, which oversaw the operation of several local educational institutions.

Gilani served as Sajjada Nashin of the shrine of Musa Pak Shaheed in Multan. He died in Multan on 9 August 1978 and was buried within the precincts of the shrine.
