= Tomb of Shah Ali Akbar =

Coordinates: 30°13′04″N 71°26′16″E

- آرامگاه شاه علی اکبر (Urdu)
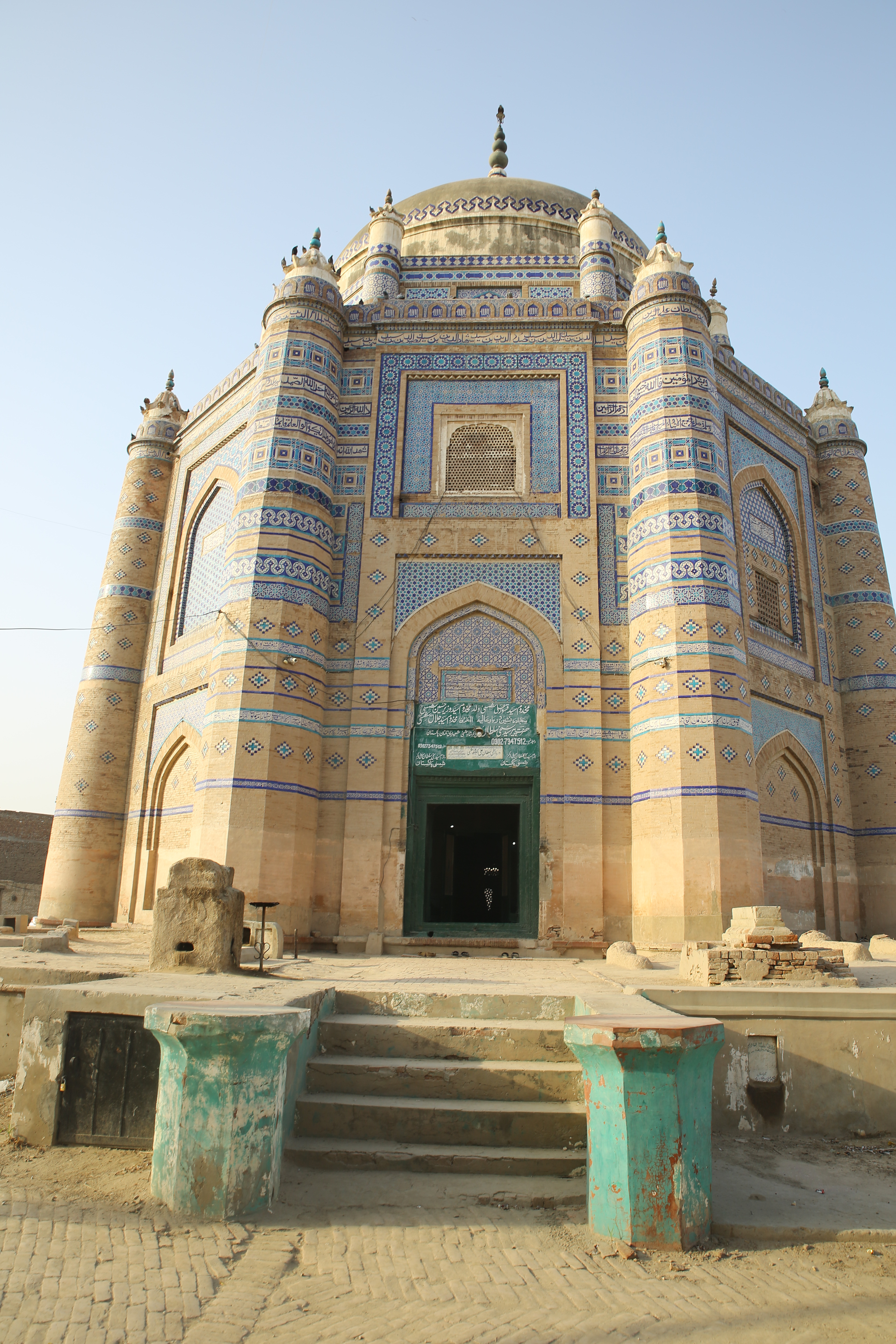
- Tomb of Shah Ali Akbar and nearby mosque
- Interactive map of Tomb of Shah Ali Akbar
- Location: Suraj Miani, Multan, Punjab, Pakistan

History
- Built: Mid-16th century

The Tomb of Shah Ali Akbar is a tomb in Suraj Miani Multan, in Punjab province, Pakistan.

== History ==
Shah Ali Akbar, a direct descendant of Shamsuddin Sabzwari, an early propagator of Isma'ili Islam in South Asia, had his ministry thrive in the mid-16th century. A 1585 foundation stone on his tomb, coupled with oral traditions, suggest Ali Akbar personally funded the tomb, indicating significant personal wealth and probable favorable relations with local authorities, suggesting some level of official acceptance of Ismai'li activities during this period.

== Architecture ==
The tomb is often called the "little Rukn-e Alam" due to its architectural similarities with the nearby Rukn-e Alam mausoleum. Both share elements of the Tughluq style, like battered walls, tapering turrets, and an octagonal layout with domes. Despite the Tughluqs' long-gone reign, their architectural style persisted in Multan and nearby regions, particularly Uch Sharif.

The tomb subtly incorporates contemporary architectural trends of the late 16th century. During this period, the reign of the third Mughal emperor, Akbar, saw Mughal architects experiment with plaster for easily carvable surfaces. In a first for Multan, plaster was extensively used inside the tomb, mirroring the contemporary use at the Maryam Zamani mosque and Fatehpur Sikri. The architects, Ibrahim and Rajab, sons of Musa of Lahore, may have introduced this trend from one of the Mughal Empire's main cities.

Initially, the tomb's interior plaster surfaces were adorned with high-quality murals and frescoes, which have suffered significant damage due to time and continuous exposure to pigeon droppings.

== Gallery ==
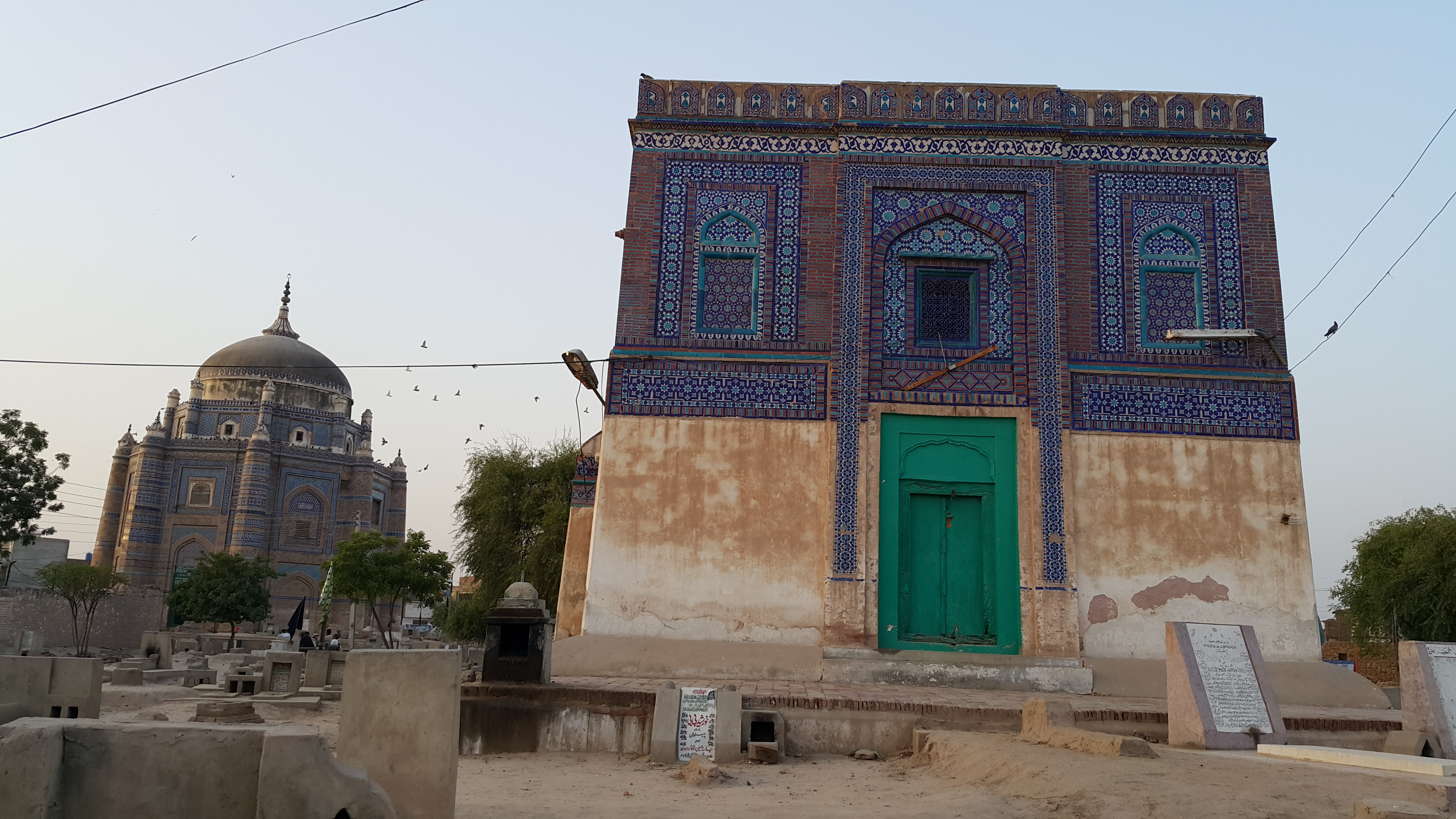
Shah Ali Akbar's tomb (left) is adjacent to that of his mother's (right)
