= Manka (stone) =

Stone in Multan, Punjab, Pakistan

The Manka is a famous stone that lies on an old tomb in the city of Multan, Punjab, Pakistan.

It is a chocolate-coloured stone with light yellow marks on it, 35 1/2 feet (10.8 m) in length, 27 inches (69 cm) in diameter and 78 inches (2.0 m) thick, with a hole 9 inches in diameter through its centre.

The tomb lies outside the Delhi Gate. Some people believe a saint wore it round his neck, while some maintain that it was his thumb ring. The tomb is believed to be 1300 years old. It is possible that it may belong to the times of the early Muslim invasion under Muhammad bin Qasim.
