= Multan Museum =

The Multan Museum (Punjabi: عجائب کعر ملتان) is located in the city of Multan and the Multan District, in Punjab Province of eastern Pakistan.

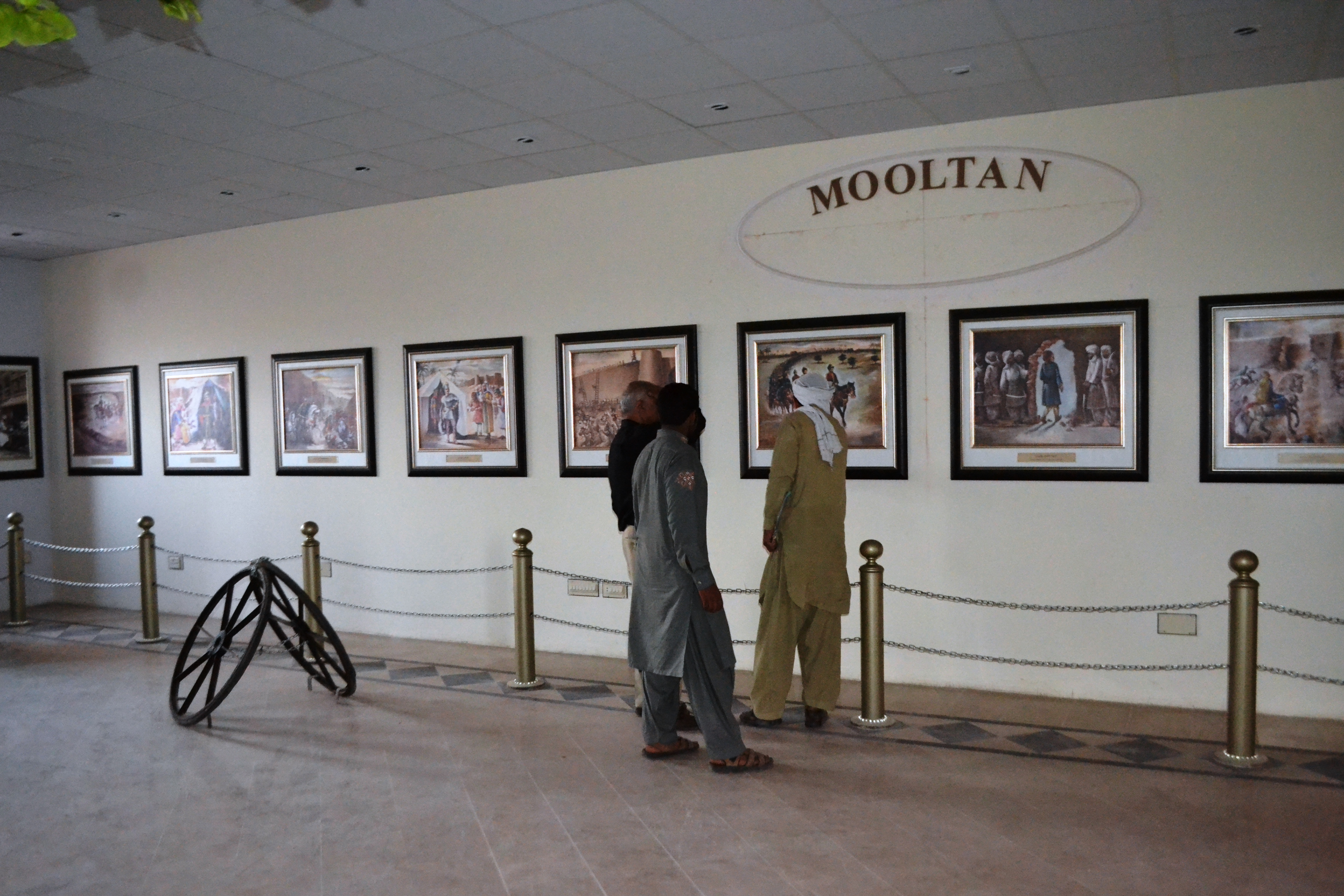
Multan Museum

== Collections ==
The Multan Museum contains a fine collection of coins, medals, postage stamps of the former State of Bahawalpur, manuscripts, documented inscriptions, wood carvings, camel-skin paintings, historical models and stone carvings of the Islamic and Pre-Islamic periods.

== New building ==
A new home for the Multan Museum is under reconstruction. The City Government and Punjab Government are converting the Ghanta Ghar building into the new Multan Museum.

== See also ==
- List of museums in Pakistan
- Multani Caravanserai
