= Sawi Mosque =

Mosque in Multan, Punjab, Pakistan

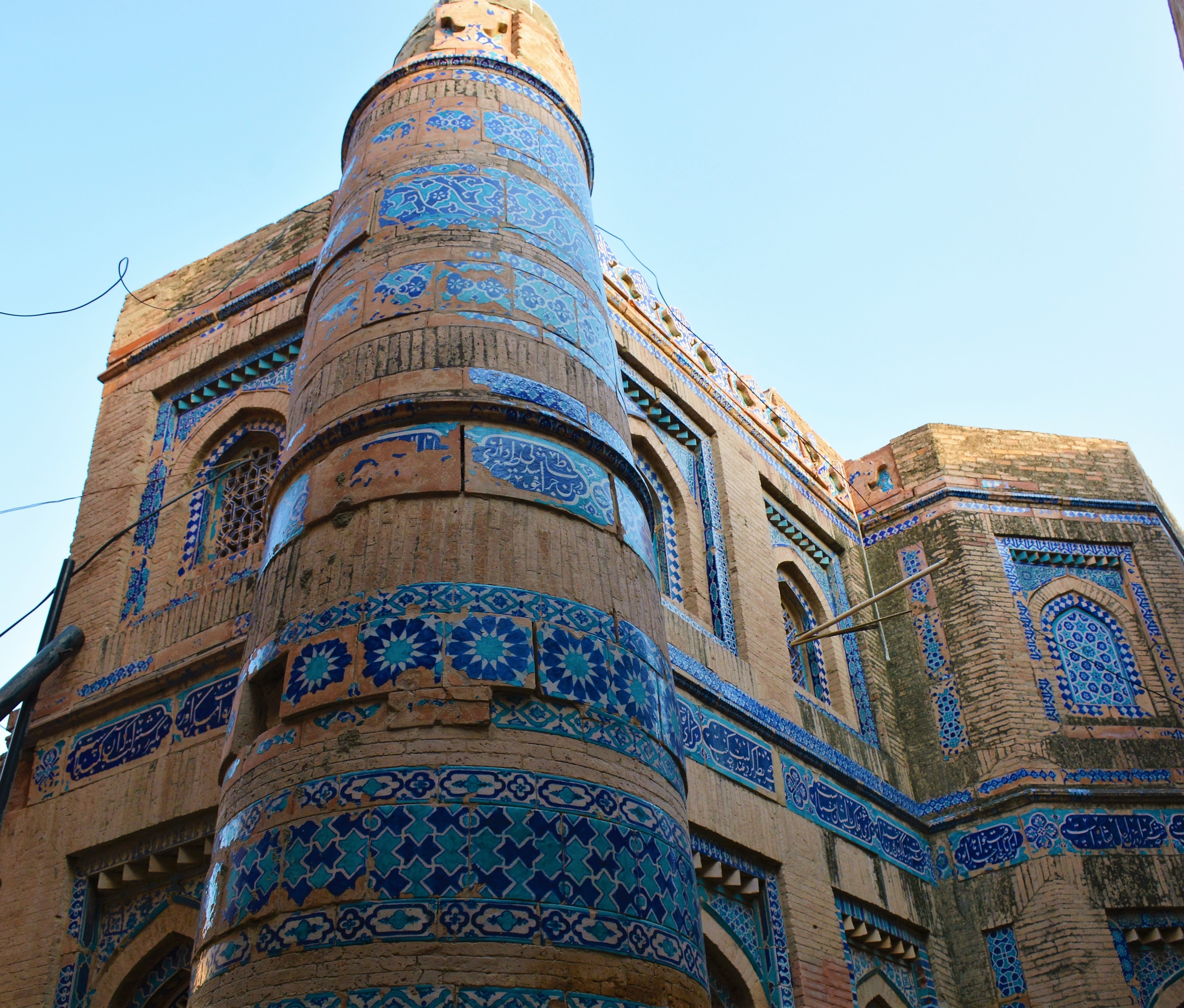

Religion
- Affiliation: Islam

Location
- Municipality: Multan
- State: Punjab
- Country: Pakistan

Architecture
- Type: mosque

Sawi Mosque is a mosque located in Mohalla Tolay Khan, northwest Multan, Pakistan.

== Architecture ==
It is a unique, roofless structure enclosing several graves. Despite being commonly known as a mosque, it more closely resembles an embellished wall around a significant burial site, featuring mosque-like elements for onsite devotion.

Its intricately decorated wall, bearing Quranic inscriptions and Persian couplets, indicates the grave likely belongs to a person of prominence or wealth. However, the actual identities associated with the centrally placed gravestones remain undisclosed, with the only named occupant being Safar Quli, who died in 999 AH (June 1591 CE).

The verse inscription credit goes to Zakariyya bin Ustad Muhammed, while a Hamiyyat Allah of Balharre claims authorship of the verses on a tombstone's reverse side.
