= Shams al-Din Multani =

Sufi saint

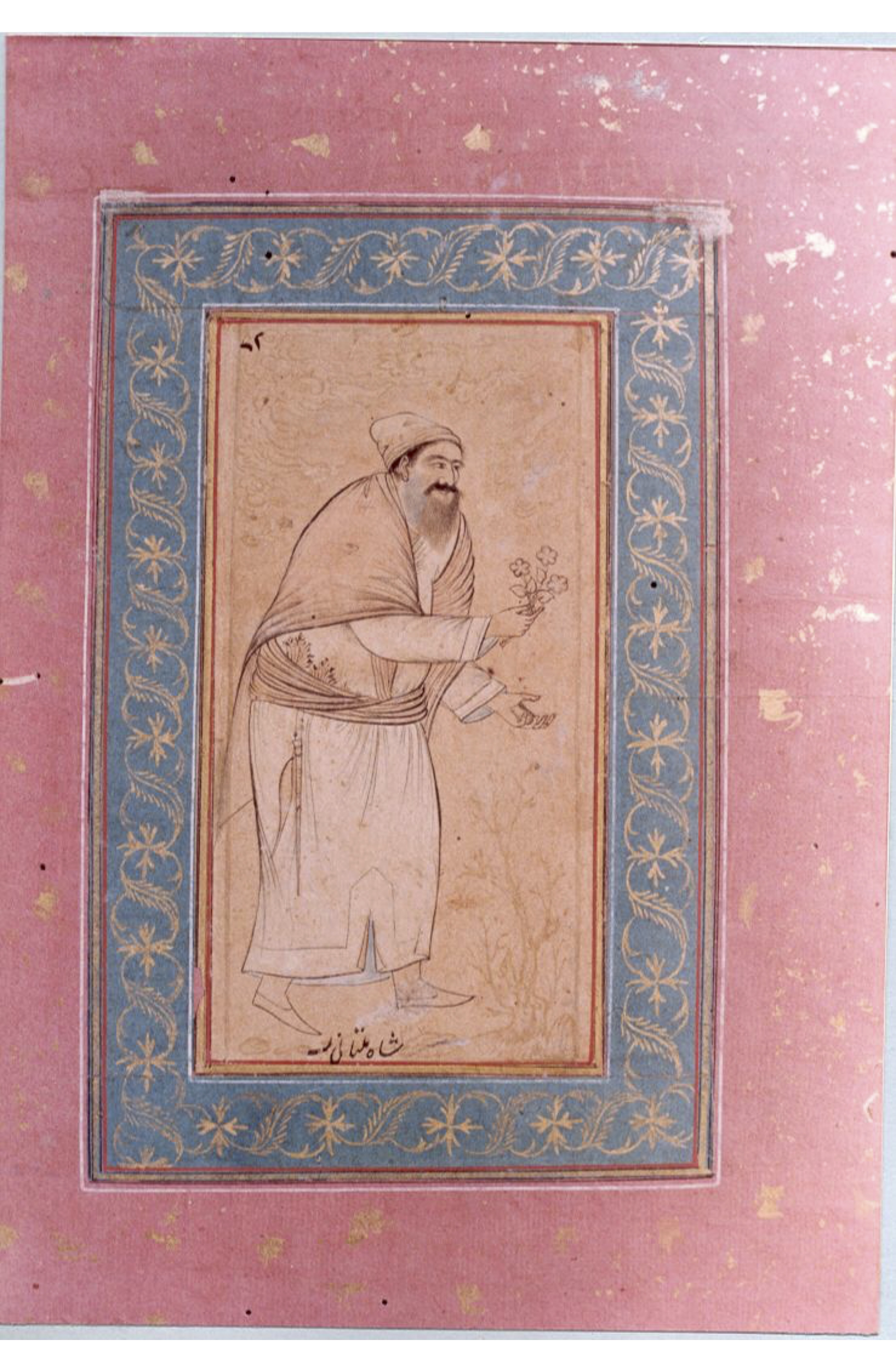
Painting of Shah Multani, from a manuscript in the collection of Rampur Raza Library

Shah Shams al-Din Multani, nisbah also given as Tabrezi, Sabzwari, Parinda, Maghribi, Iraqi and various others, was an Isma'ili Muslim saint who is believed to have flourished between the 12th and 14th centuries, and is traditionally considered progenitor of the Shamsi family of Multan, where the mausoleum attributed to him is located. No pre 19th-century source gives details about his background; all what is known regarding it was written down in the British Raj period onwards. Farhad Daftary calls him "an obscure missionary clouded in numerous legends".

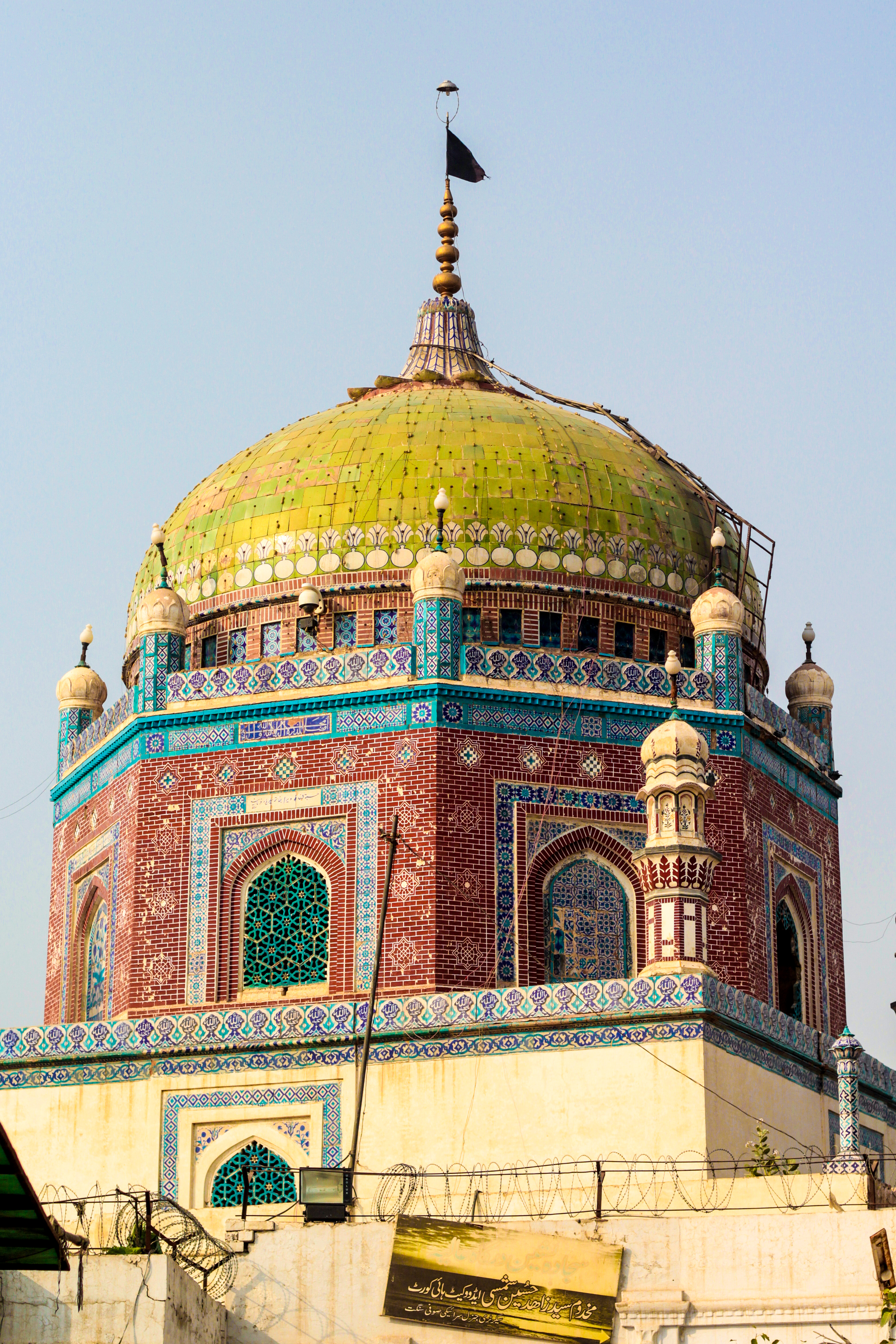
The shrine of Shams al-Din Multani in Multan, Pakistan.

According to the family traditions, Shams al-Din was born in Sabzewar in present-day Iran. His father was named Syed Salah al-Din, who was said to be the descendant of Shi'a imam Ja'far al-Sadiq and hence, of Ali. Shams al-Din is said to have travelled to Badakhshan, Tabriz, and Baghdad, before moving on to Multan, during the times of Baha al-Din Zakariya. Zakariya is said to be the rival of Shams al-Din and to have even opposed his settling in the city. The Urs of Shams al-Din takes place in June of each year.

== Mausoleum and Urs ==
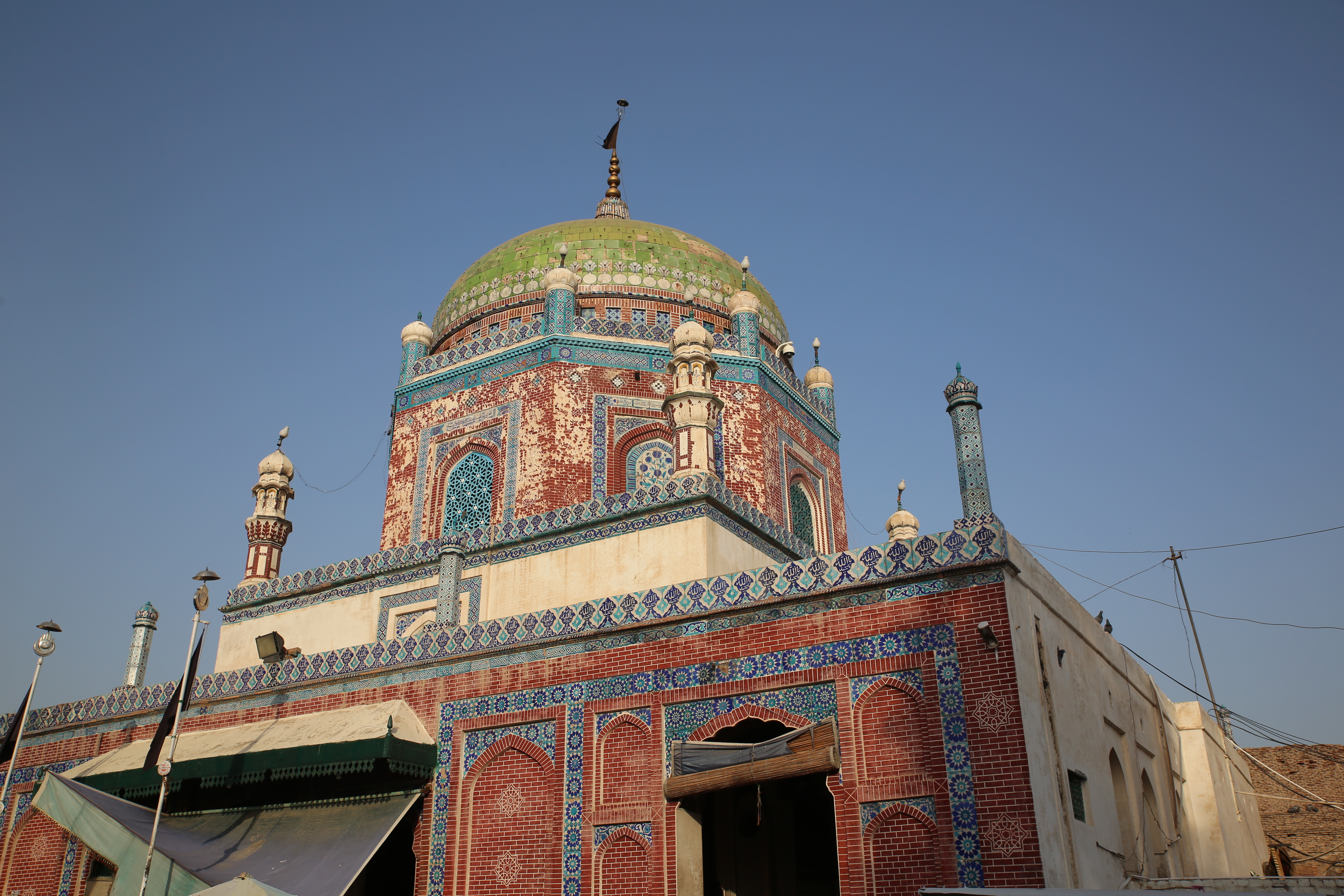

The mausoleum of Shams al-Din Multani is located on the high bank of the Ravi River, said to have been built by his grandson in the 14th century. The tomb is square, 30 feet (9.1 m) in height and surmounted by a hemispherical dome. It is decorated with ornamental glazed tiles.

== Compositions ==
The ginan literature identifies him as the first figure associated with Nizari Isma'ili activities in Sindh.

In the closing lines of one of his Punjabi compositions, Pīr Shams emphasizes that his ginān is addressed to the world of spirits. He advises his listeners to fight and overcome their constantly changing minds so their spirits can be enlightened by his teachings. Failure to understand the deeper meaning of the gināns will cause the 'entire life of that heedless one [to be] lost'.

== See also ==
- Mausoleums of Multan
