= Clock Tower, Multan =

Clock tower in Punjab, Pakistan

- تل گھر
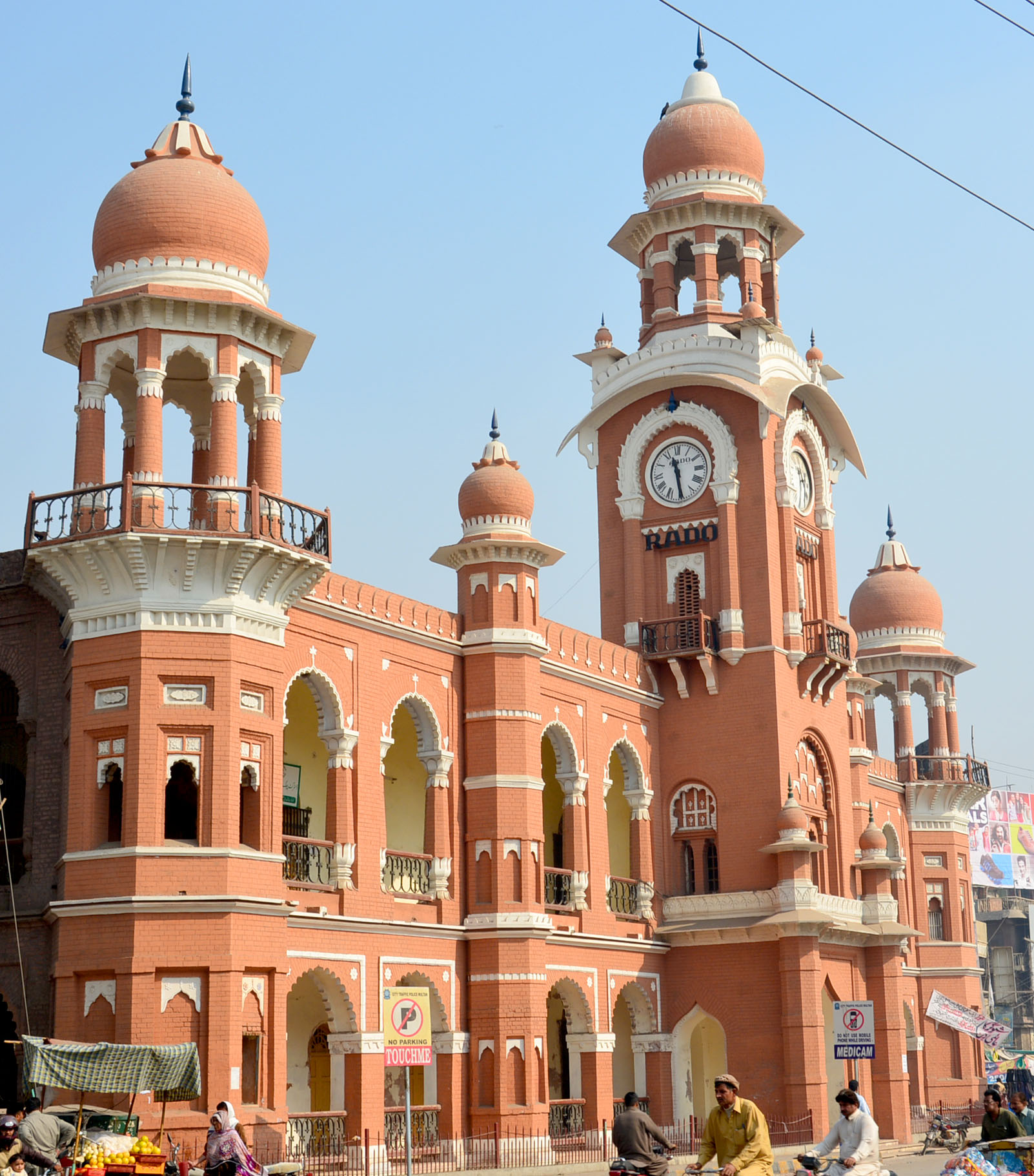
- Interactive map of the Clock Tower, Multan area
- Former names: Northbrook Tower
- Alternative names: Tall Karr

General information
- Type: Clock tower
- Architectural style: Indo-Saracenic
- Location: Multan, Punjab, Pakistan
- Coordinates: 30°11′55″N 71°28′04″E
- Construction started: 1884
- Completed: 1888
- Owner: Government of Punjab

Clock Tower (Punjabi: تل گھر), formerly known as Northbrook Tower, is a clock tower and city government headquarters of Multan in the Punjab province of Pakistan.

== History ==
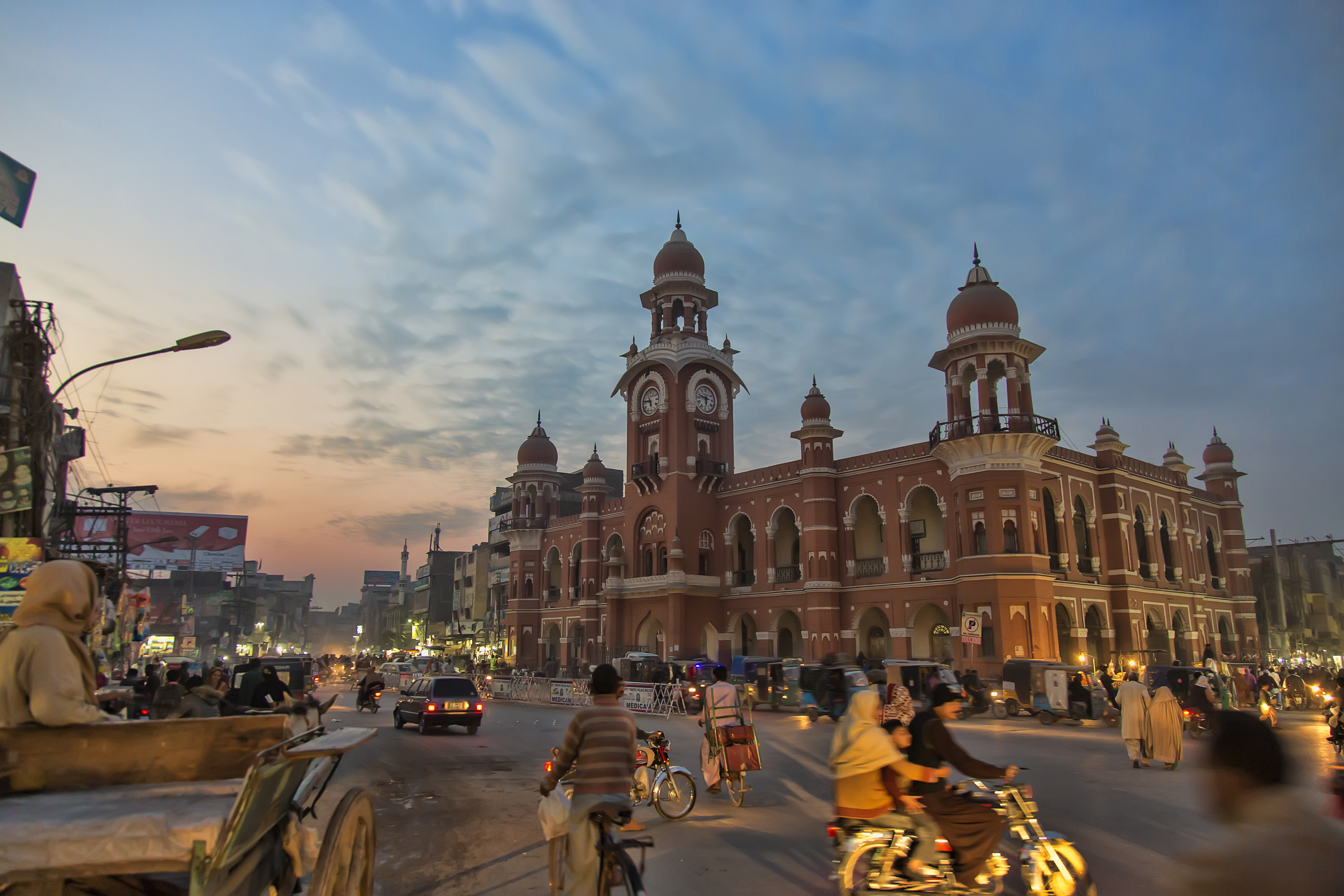
Multan's Ghanta Ghar dates from the British colonial period, and was built in the Indo-Saracenic style.

Ghanta Ghar or Clock Tower of Multan was built in 1884 in British India. After passing the municipal act of 1883 British needed offices to run the city. They started constructing Ghanta Ghar in Multan on 12 February 1884 and it took 4 years to completely build this building. It was constructed over the ruins of Haveli of Ahmad Khan Sadozai which was completely destroyed during Siege of Multan. The hall and building were named 'Ripon Hall and Ripon Building' after the name of Ripon, viceroy of India at that time. And clock tower was named Northbrook Tower after the name of Northbrook, a former Viceroy of India (1872–3).

This building was completed, opened and offices shifted in 1888. Hall was named 'Jinnah Hall' after the independence of Pakistan in 1947 and is used for office meetings, cultural programs, and is open to the public. With the passage of time, this building became insufficient for offices and a small hall was also insufficient for meetings, so offices were shifted from here. Now it is said that plan for the future is to change this historic building into a museum.

== Clocks ==
On 27 October 2011, three clocks of Ghanta Ghar were repaired and started again showing the time of PST which is +5GMT. This effort was done by a watch company Rado Watchmaker. The machinery and needles of the clocks were changed while the clock's main dial was unchanged. It runs on solar energy. The clock had stopped working in 1985.

== Multan Museum ==
Ghanta Ghar Multan is made a museum by the city government called Multan Museum. Funds have been allocated and work has been started but the site remains closed to the public as each new government that comes erases the previous government's plans and promises.

== See also ==
- List of clock towers in Pakistan
- Ghantaghar, Chandni Chowk, Delhi
