= Chisht Nagar =

Town in Changa Manga, Pakistan

Chisht Nagar (Punjabi/Urdu: چشت نگر) is a town in Punjab, Pakistan.
