= Shah Gardez =

Islamic Sufi saint

Shah Yousuf Gardez was an Islamic Sufi saint who came to Multan, (present-day Punjab, Pakistan) in 1088 AD. He is said to have restored the city of Multan, converted many people to the Islamic religion, and performed numerous miracles. He came from Gardez in the present-day Paktia Province of Afghanistan.

== Gallery ==
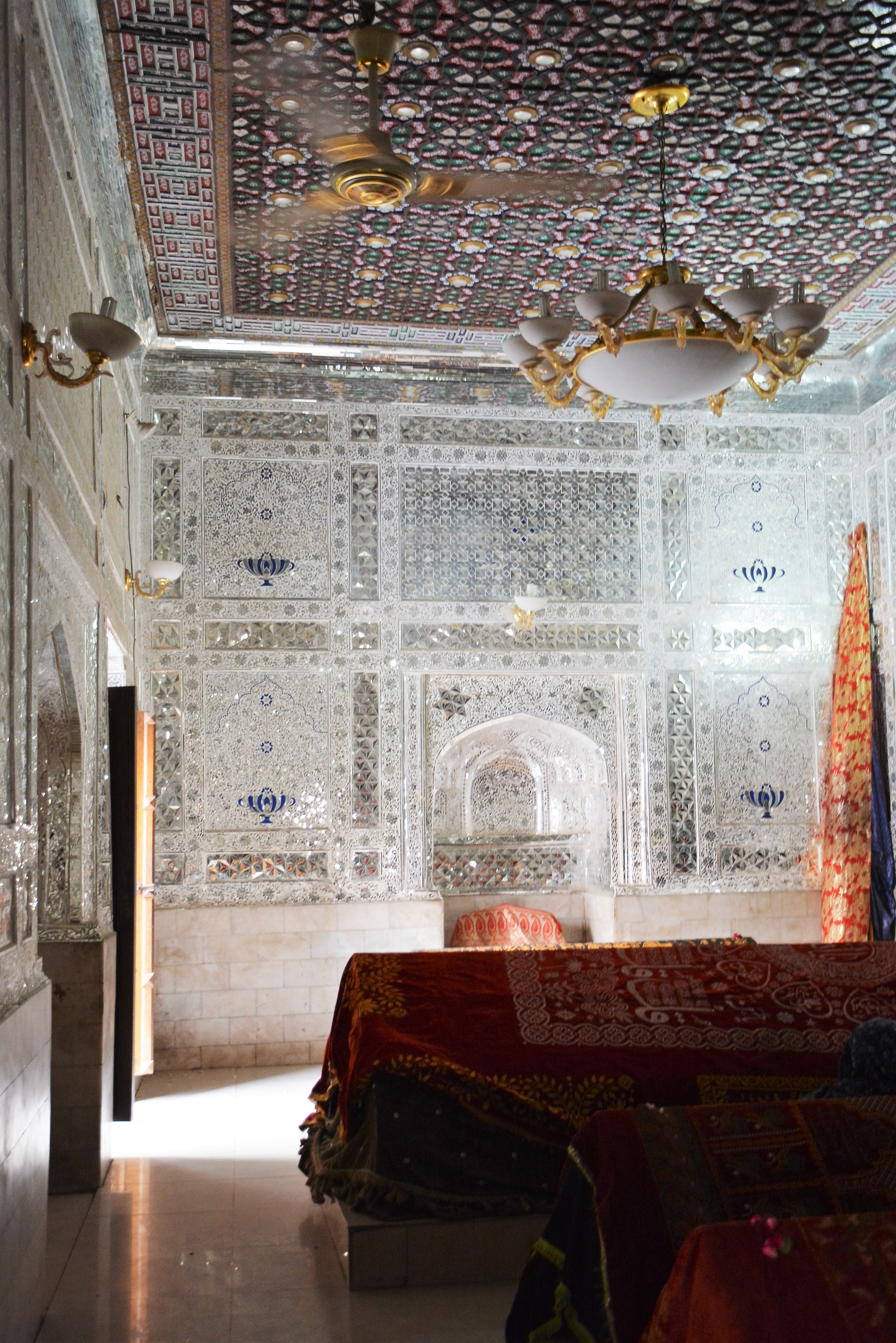
The shrine's interior is decorated with extensive mirror-work known as āina-kāri

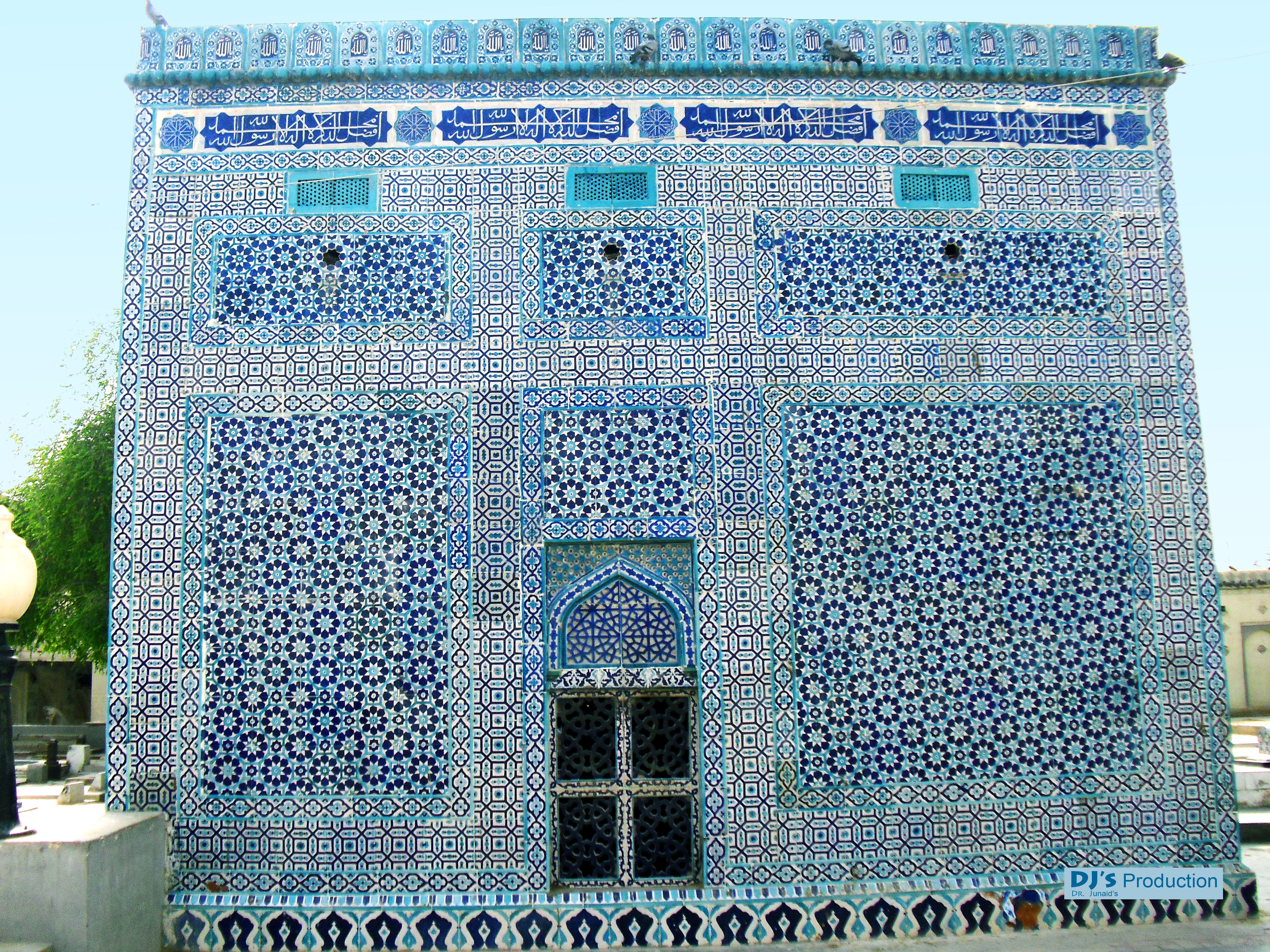

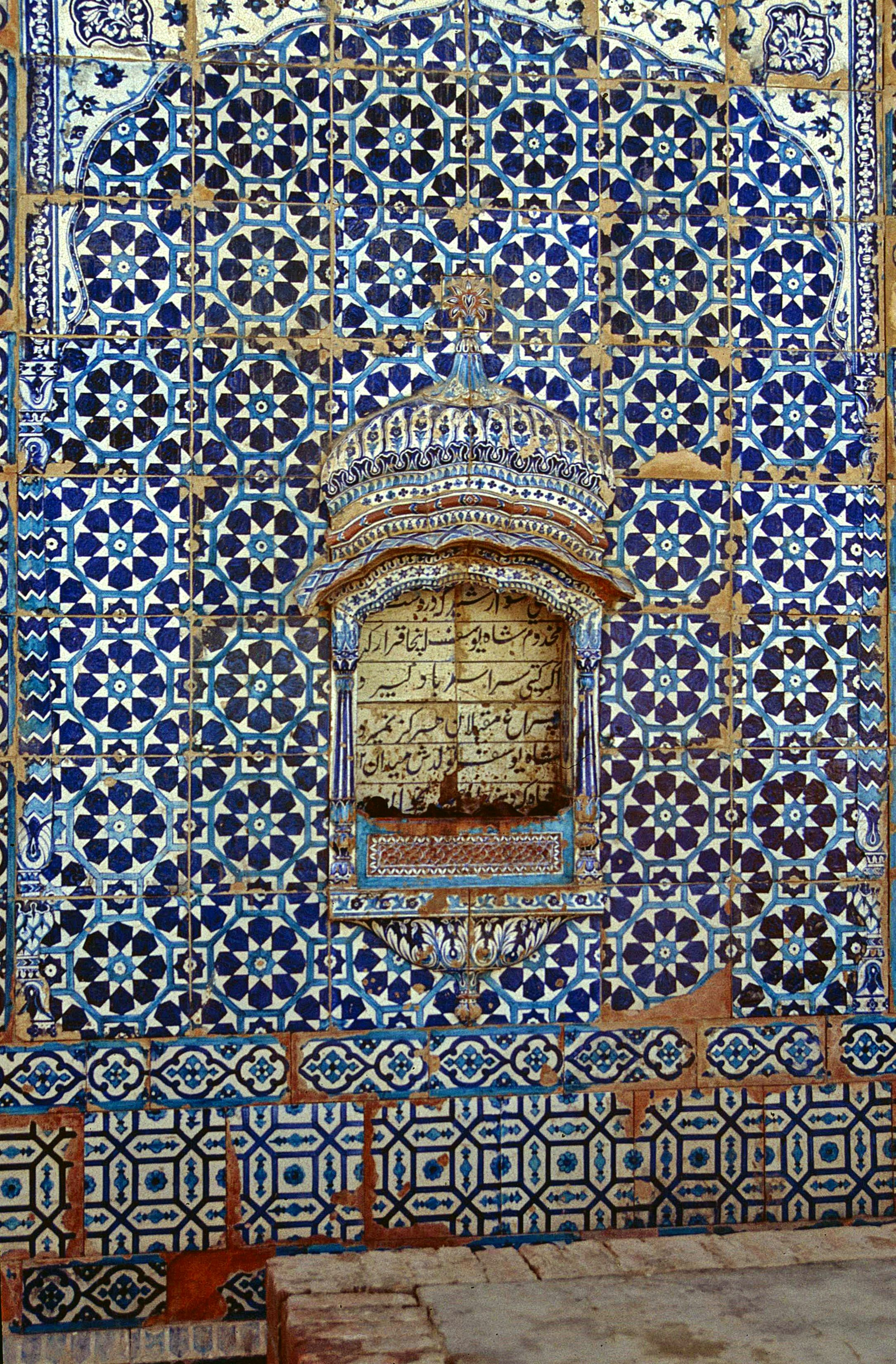
The shrine is covered in blue tile-work that is typical of Multani style.

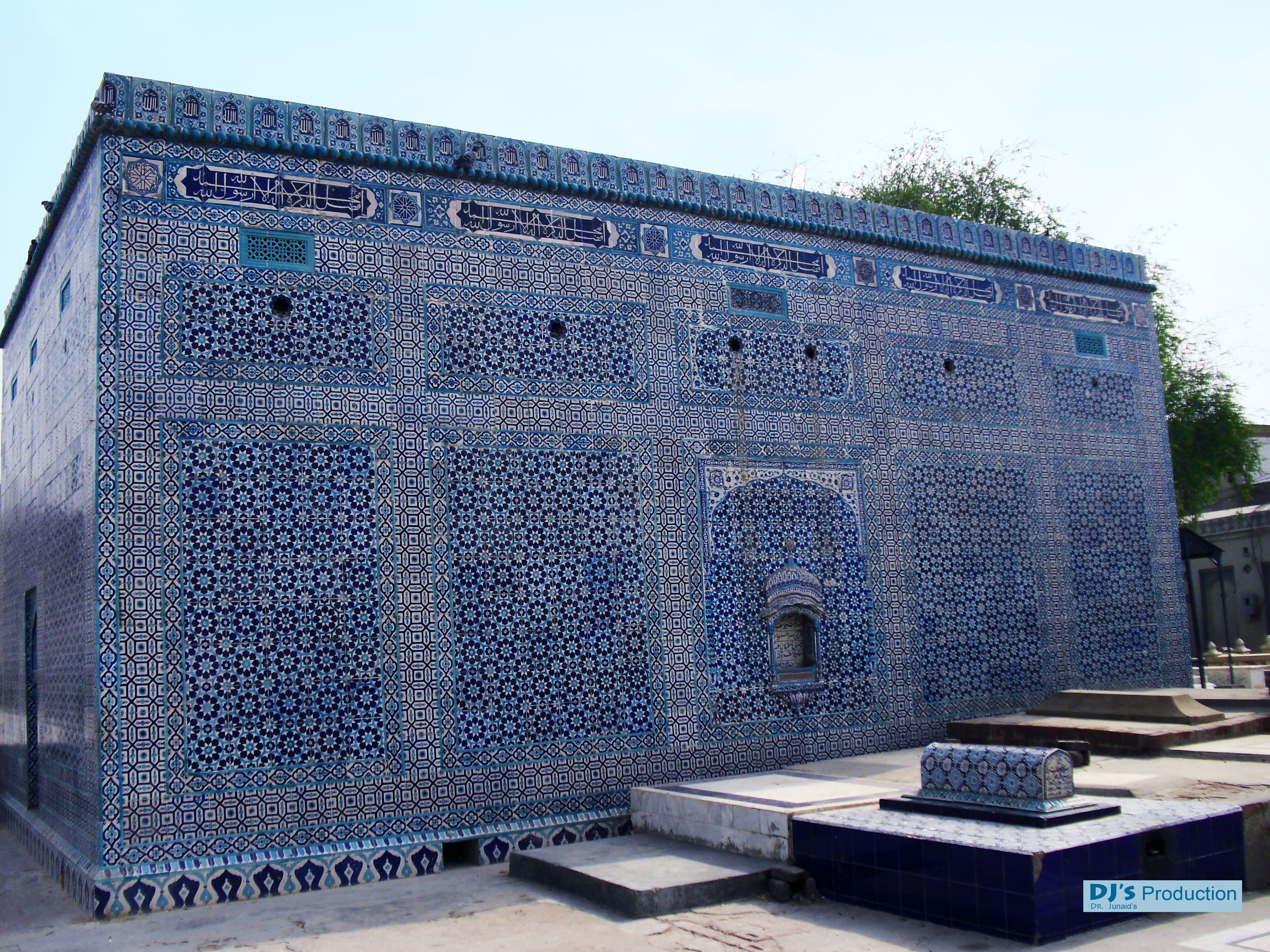
Tomb of Shah Yousuf Gardezi Multan

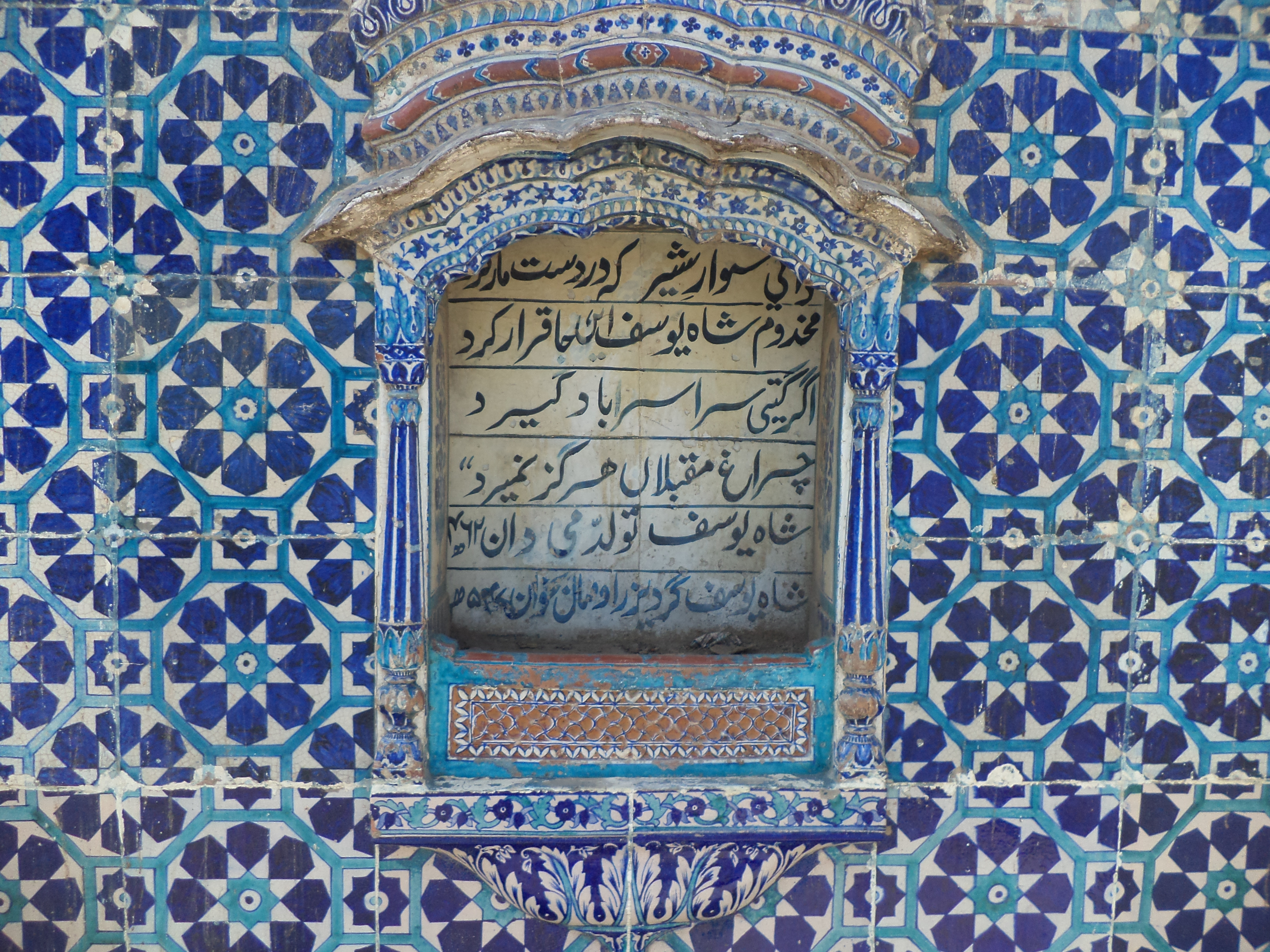
The tomb's exterior is decorated with couples from Shah Gardez.

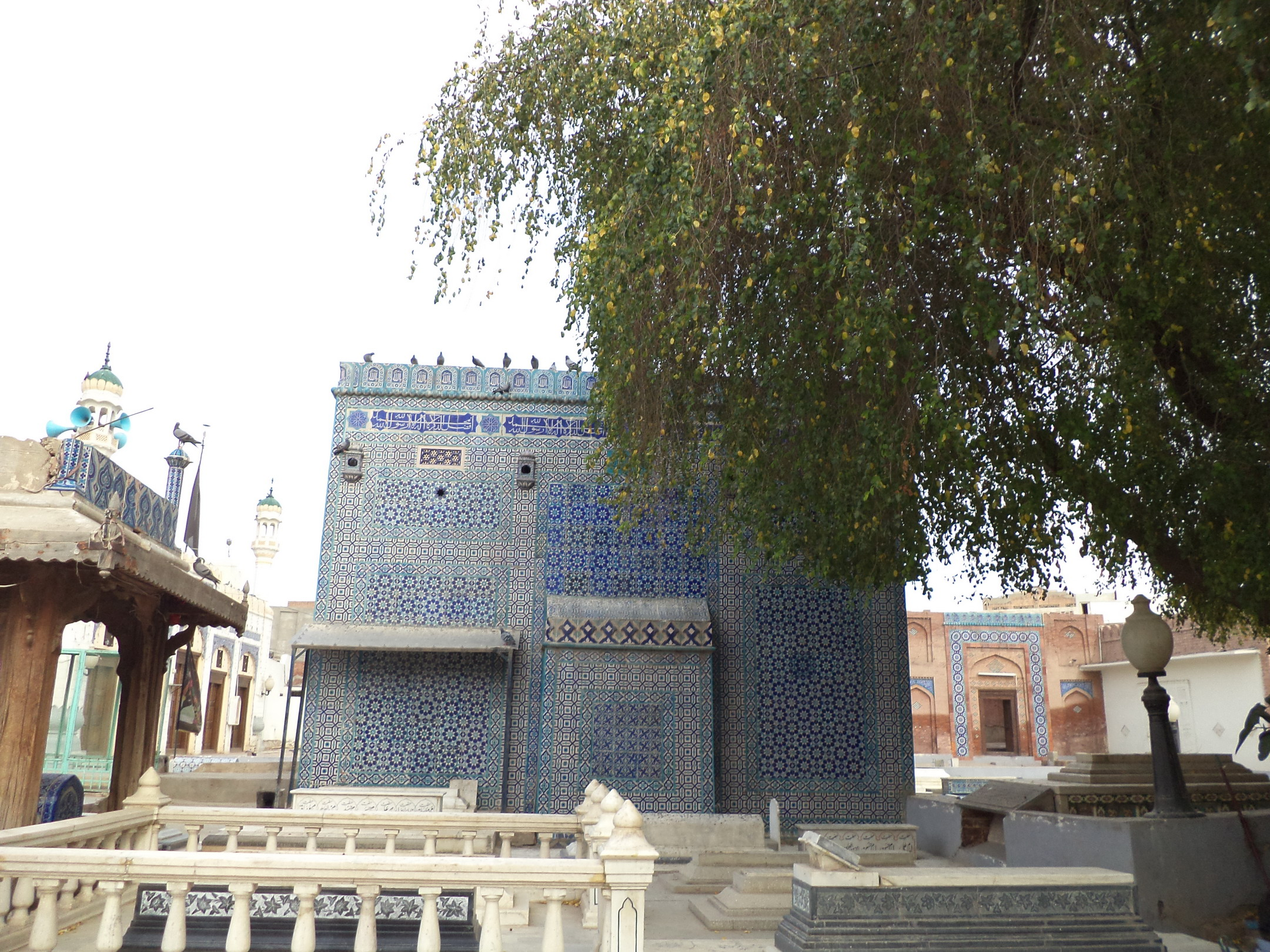
A side view of the Shah Gardez Tomb

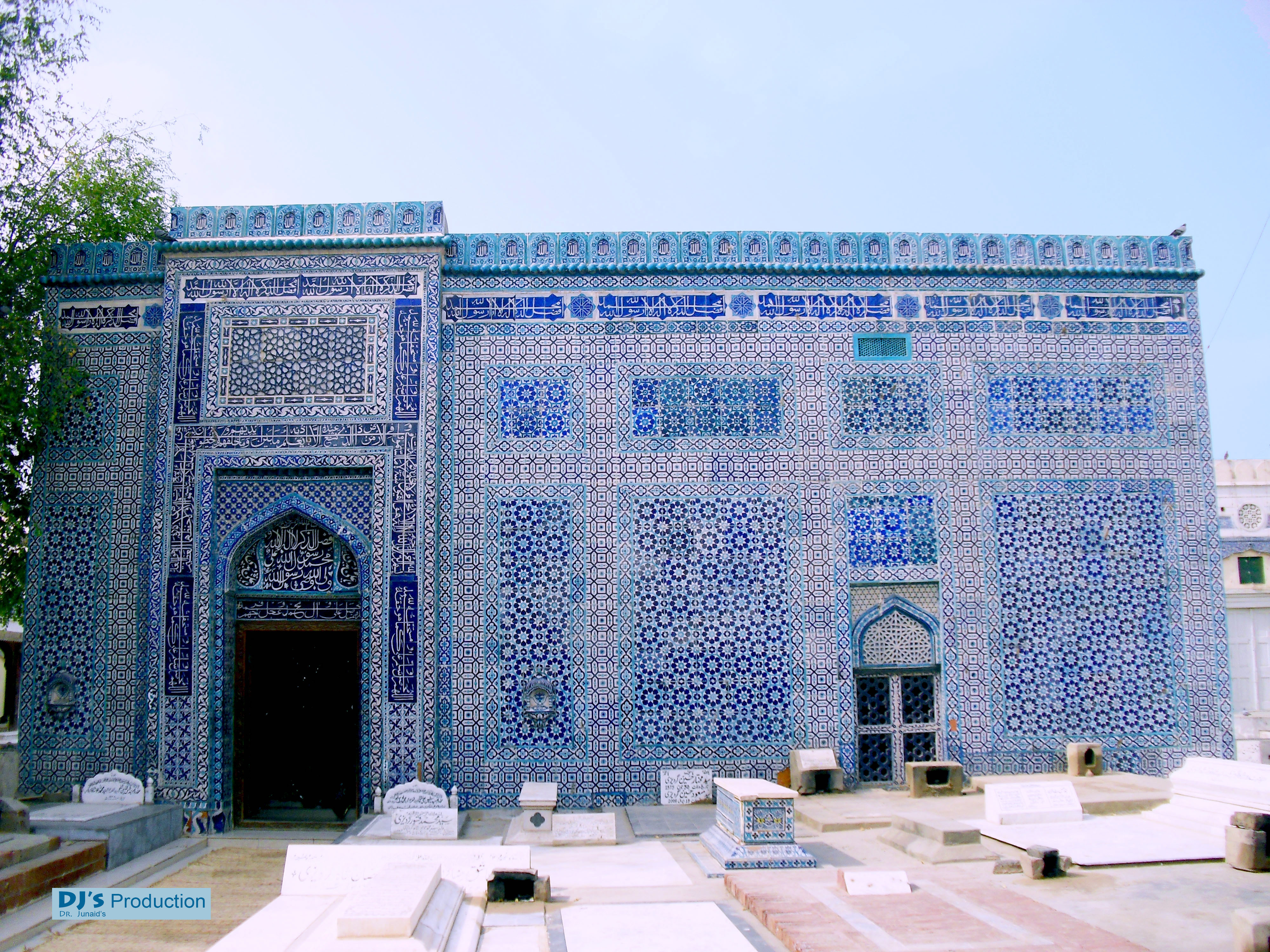
