= Syed Musa Pak =

Shaikh Syed Abul Hassan Musa Pak Shaheed (Urdu: شيخ سيد ابوالحساب موسى پاک شهيد) was Sufi and his mausoleum is located at Multan, Punjab, Pakistan. Shaikh Syed Abul Hassan was son of Syed Hamid Bakhsh Gilani.His shrine is situated in historical city of Multan. Syed Musa Pak buried near Pak Gate inside the wall city of Multan, Punjab, Pakistan. The Urs of Syed Musa Pak Shaheed takes place annually at his Mausoleum in Multan.(11ve Wali Sarkar).

== See also ==
- Multan
- Baha-ud-din Zakariya
- Rukn-e-Alam
- Shaikh Sama'al-Din Kamboh
