= Faisalabad Division =

Administrative Division in Punjab, Pakistan

Coordinates: 31°15′N 72°48′E

Faisalabad Division فیصل آباد ڈویژن
- Division
- Map of Faisalabad Division
- Country: Pakistan
- Province: (Punjab, Pakistan) Punjab
- Capital: Faisalabad

Government
  - Type: Divisional Administration
  - Commissioner: Silwat Saeed
  - Regional Police Officer: N/A

Area
  - Division: 17,917 km^{2} (6,918 sq mi)

Population (2023)
  - Division: 16,228,526
  - Density: 905.71/km^{2} (2,345.8/sq mi)
  - Urban: 6,249,102 (38.51%)
  - Rural: 9,979,424 (61.49%)

Literacy
  - Literacy rate: Total: (68.80%); Male: (74.51%); Female: (62.65%)
- Website: faisalabaddivision.punjab.gov.pk

Faisalabad Division is an administrative division of Punjab, Pakistan. The reforms of 2000 abolished the third tier of government but was restored again in 2008.

== Demographics ==
=== Population ===
Historical population
Year	Pop.	±% p.a.
1951	N/A	—
1961	N/A	—
1972	N/A	—
1981	N/A	—
1998	9,885,685	—
2017	14,177,081	+1.92%
2023	16,228,526	+2.28%

According to the 2023 census, Faisalabad division had a population of 16,228,526 roughly equal to the nation of Netherlands or the US state of New York.

== Districts ==
District	Headquarter	Area (km²)	Pop. (2023)	Density (ppl/km²) (2023)	Lit. rate (2023)
Toba Tek Singh	Toba Tek Singh	3,252	2,524,044	776.2	71.38%
Jhang	Jhang	6,166	3,065,639	497.6	59.45%
Chiniot	Chiniot	2,643	1,563,024	591.3	55.05%
Faisalabad	Faisalabad	5,856	9,075,819	1,551.7	73.41%

== Tehsils ==
Tehsil	Area (km²)	Pop. (2023)	Density (ppl/km²) (2023)	Lit. rate (2023)	Districts
Bhowana	879	428,617	487.62	48.94%	Chiniot District
Chiniot	709	633,621	893.68	57.31%	Chiniot District
Lalian	1,055	500,786	474.68	57.26%	Chiniot District
Chak Jhumra	654	385,169	588.94	70.56%	Faisalabad District
Faisalabad City	168	3,691,999	21,976.18	81.59%	Faisalabad District
Faisalabad Sadar	1,186	1,742,958	1,469.61	71.25%	Faisalabad District
Jaranwala	1,811	1,731,148	955.91	66.32%	Faisalabad District
Samundri	754	729,672	967.73	75.99%	Faisalabad District
Tandlianwala	1,284	794,873	619.06	52.83%	Faisalabad District
Shorkot	1,158	604,763	522.25	58.12%	Jhang District
Jhang	2,591	1,640,676	633.22	60.96%	Jhang District
Ahmadpur Sial	851	487,905	573.33	56.87%	Jhang District
Athara Hazari	1,566	332,295	212.19	58.05%	Jhang District
Mandi Shah Jeewna	N/A	N/A	N/A	N/A	Jhang District
Kamalia	486	422,477	869.29	63.55%	Toba Tek Singh District
Gojra	851	755,579	887.87	74.22%	Toba Tek Singh District
Pirmahal	774	496,636	641.65	68.39%	Toba Tek Singh District
Toba Tek Singh	1,141	849,352	744.39	74.45%	Toba Tek Singh District

== Constituencies ==
Provincial Assembly Constituency	National Assembly Constituency	District
PP-94 Chiniot-I	NA-93 Chiniot-I	Chiniot
PP-97 Chiniot-IV	NA-93 Chiniot-I	Chiniot
PP-95 Chiniot-II	NA-94 Chiniot-II	Chiniot
PP-96 Chiniot-III	NA-94 Chiniot-II	Chiniot
PP-98 Faisalabad-I	NA-95 Faisalabad-I	Faisalabad
PP-99 Faisalabad-II	NA-95 Faisalabad-I	Faisalabad
PP-100 Faisalabad-III	NA-96 Faisalabad-II	Faisalabad
PP-101 Faisalabad-IV	NA-96 Faisalabad-II	Faisalabad
PP-102 Faisalabad-V	NA-97 Faisalabad-III	Faisalabad
PP-103 Faisalabad-VI	NA-97 Faisalabad-III	Faisalabad
PP-104 Faisalabad-VII	NA-98 Faisalabad-IV	Faisalabad
PP-105 Faisalabad-VIII	NA-98 Faisalabad-IV	Faisalabad
PP-106 Faisalabad-IX	NA-99 Faisalabad-V	Faisalabad
PP-107 Faisalabad-X	NA-99 Faisalabad-V	Faisalabad
PP-108 Faisalabad-XI	NA-100 Faisalabad-VI	Faisalabad
PP-109 Faisalabad-XII	NA-100 Faisalabad-VI	Faisalabad
PP-113 Faisalabad-XVI	NA-101 Faisalabad-VII	Faisalabad
PP-114 Faisalabad-XVII	NA-101 Faisalabad-VII	Faisalabad
PP-115 Faisalabad-XVIII	NA-102 Faisalabad-VIII	Faisalabad
PP-116 Faisalabad-XIX	NA-102 Faisalabad-VIII	Faisalabad
PP-117 Faisalabad-XX	NA-103 Faisalabad-IX	Faisalabad
PP-118 Faisalabad-XXI	NA-103 Faisalabad-IX	Faisalabad
PP-110 Faisalabad-XIII	NA-104 Faisalabad-X	Faisalabad
PP-111 Faisalabad-XIV	NA-104 Faisalabad-X	Faisalabad
PP-112 Faisalabad-XV	NA-104 Faisalabad-X	Faisalabad
PP-119 Toba Tek Singh-I	NA-105 Toba Tek Singh-I	Toba Tek Singh
PP-120 Toba Tek Singh-II	NA-105 Toba Tek Singh-I	Toba Tek Singh
PP-121 Toba Tek Singh-III	NA-106 Toba Tek Singh-II	Toba Tek Singh
PP-122 Toba Tek Singh-IV	NA-106 Toba Tek Singh-II	Toba Tek Singh
PP-123 Toba Tek Singh-V	NA-107 Toba Tek Singh-III	Toba Tek Singh
PP-124 Toba Tek Singh-VI	NA-107 Toba Tek Singh-III	Toba Tek Singh
PP-125 Jhang-I	NA-108 Jhang-I	Jhang
PP-126 Jhang-II	NA-108 Jhang-I	Jhang
PP-131 Jhang-VII	NA-108 Jhang-I	Jhang
PP-127 Jhang-III	NA-109 Jhang-II	Jhang
PP-128 Jhang-IV	NA-109 Jhang-II	Jhang
PP-129 Jhang-V	NA-110 Jhang-III	Jhang
PP-130 Jhang-VI	NA-110 Jhang-III	Jhang

== See also ==
- Divisions of Pakistan
  - Divisions of Punjab, Pakistan
  - Divisions of Balochistan, Pakistan
  - Divisions of Khyber Pakhtunkhwa
  - Divisions of Sindh, Pakistan
  - Divisions of Azad Kashmir
  - Divisions of Gilgit-Baltistan
- Districts of Pakistan
  - Districts of Punjab, Pakistan
  - Districts of Sindh
  - Districts of Balochistan, Pakistan
  - Districts of Khyber Pakhtunkhwa
  - Districts of Azad Kashmir
  - Districts of Gilgit-Baltistan
- List of Tehsils of Punjab
