= Noor Pur, Toba Tek Singh District =

lamha Pind(Noor Pur)
- Village
- Chak # 331 GB
- Country: Pakistan
- Province: Punjab
- Division: Faisalabad
- District: Toba Tek Singh
- Tehsil: Toba Tek Singh
- Time zone: UTC+5 (PST)
- Postal Code: 36331

Noor Pur is a village of the Tehsil and District of Toba Tek Singh, Punjab, Pakistan. Its full name is Chak # 331 GB Noor Pur. This village is 12 km from Pir Mahal, a town of Kamalia (Tehsil of Toba Tek Singh District). Its neighborhood villages are Chak # 330 GB., Chak # 332 GB Jakhara Chak # 333 GB Fridabad. Leading families of Noor Pur include "Chobarey walas" and others. Edited By Mr.Waqas Ahmed (Author)

In 2021, 3 students from the village died in a traffic accident.
