= Toba Tek Singh (disambiguation) =

Toba Tek Singh is a city in Punjab Province of Pakistan.

Toba Tek Singh may also refer to:

- Toba Tek Singh District, district of which Toba Tek Singh is the administrative capital
- Toba Tek Singh Tehsil, subdistrict or tehsil which is part of Toba Tek Singh District
- "Toba Tek Singh" (short story), a 1955 story published by Saadat Hasan Manto
  - Toba Tek Singh (film), a 2018 Indian film adaptation
- Boota from Toba Tek Singh, Pakistani television series
