= Nawan Lahore =

Nawan Lahore نواں لہور
- Town
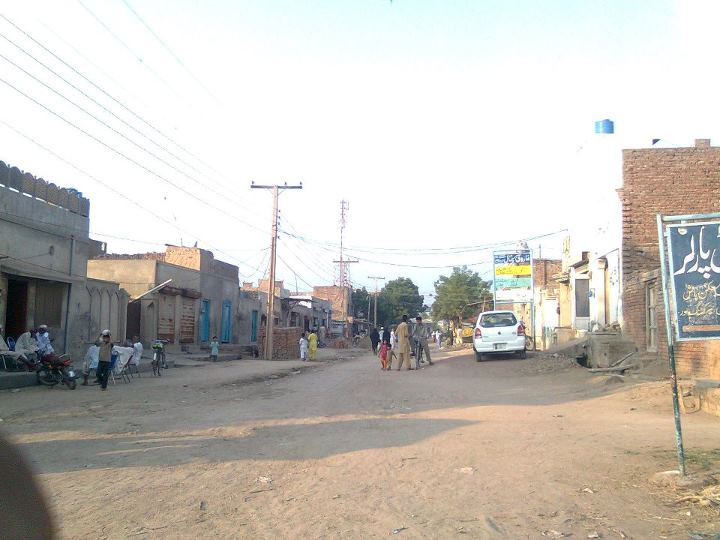
- Nawan Lahore, main chowk, near Painsra City

- Location in Pakistan
- Coordinates: 31°19′0″N 72°43′59″E
- Country: Pakistan
- Province: Punjab
- District: Toba Tek Singh
- Tehsil: Gojra

Area
  - Total: 21 km^{2} (8.1 sq mi)
- Elevation: 172 m (564 ft)

Population
  - Total: around 30,500
- Dialling code: 46
- Also known as Chak 338 JB

Nawan Lahore (Punjabi: نواں لہور lit. 'New Lahore') is a town located, near Painsra City in the Toba Tek Singh District in Punjab, Pakistan.

== Geography ==
It is about 10 kilometres (6.2 mi) west of Painsra, midway between the major cities of Jhang to the west, and Faisalabad, 40 kilometres (25 miles) to the east. The capital city of Punjab, Lahore, is 212 km (132 mi) by road to the east.

== History ==
During the 20th century, the town developed as a stopping point along the Lyallpur-Jhang trade route.

== Demographics ==
As of 2015, its population was approximately 19,500 people, making it the largest town in Gojra Tehsil.

== Government ==
The town serves as an educational and trading center. It has a Union Council (one of two in Gojra Tehsil) overseen by Chairman Mian Shamshad-ul-Haq, as well as 4 wards.

It was declared a sub-tehsil of Gojra (the tehsil of Toba Tek Singh) by the government. The offices of the Assistant Commissioner and Deputy Commissioner are due to be constructed there, on government-owned land about 3 to 5 kilometers from the main area of the sub-tehsil.

== Education ==
Nawan Lahore hosts public and private schools and colleges.
