= Budhan Khuh =

Budhan Khuh بڈھن کھوہ
- Village
- Chak # 666/7 GB
- Country: Pakistan
- Province: Punjab
- Time zone: UTC+5 (PST)

Budhan Khuh (Urdu: بڈھن کھوہ) is a town located about 7 km from Pir Mahal city and about 18 km from Kamalia city, in Toba Tek Singh District, Punjab, Pakistan. The village number is 666/7 GB. Bukhari families are the leading land lords at Budhan Khuh. One of the Main names of that area was Syed Zahoor Hussain Shah, who died in a car accident at 30 September 2008. He remained vice Chairman of union council also and was a renowned political and social figure of the area. His Son Syed Hassan Askari is now carrying forward the legacy. Ancestors of these Bukhari's are from Uch Sharif near Bahawalpur. Budhan Khuh town has a rich cultural background, having history back to Sikhs.

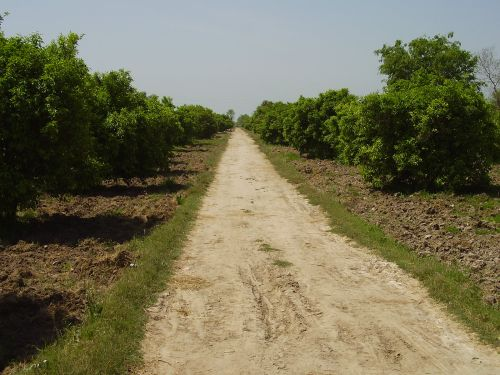
A road to garden in Budhan Khuh

== Etymology ==
The name of Budhan Khuh is after the name of an old well. As in Punjabi, well is called "khuh" and old is called "budhha". So the combination of these two words is Budhan Khuh. Syed Dharamay Shah migrated to Budhan Khuh, purchased lands and started living there.

== Agriculture ==
The major economic activity of Budhan Khuh is agriculture; and, most of the people are engaged in farming. Wheat, rice, cotton and sugar cane are the main crops of the area. Town is also rich in horticulture. There are many gardens of oranges and mangoes.
