= Chak 670/11 GB =

- Village
- Rukan-Aabad
- Location in Pakistan
- Coordinates: 30°43′45″N 72°27′51″E
- Country: Pakistan
- Province: Punjab
- District: Toba Tek Singh
- Tehsil: Pir Mahal

Area
  - Total: 1 km^{2} (0.39 sq mi)
- Elevation: 150 m (490 ft)

Population (1998)
  - Total: 10,000
  - Estimate (2010): 20,000
- Time zone: UTC+5 (PST)
- Calling code: 046

Chak No. 670/11 G.B. is a village located in Pakistan, approximately 5 kilometres (3.1 mi) from Pir Mahal.

== Geography and climate ==
The village experiences extreme weather with foggy winters, often accompanied by rain, and a temperature that ranges from −2 to 45 °C (28 to 113 °F). Climatically, the village has three major seasons: hot weather (from April to June), when the temperature rises as high as 43 °C (109 °F), the rainy season (from July to September), when the annual average rainfall is about 50 centimetres (20 in), and the cooler/mild weather (from October to March), when the temperature goes down as low as 4 °C (39 °F).

In 2006, the village, as well as the whole province of Punjab, experienced one of the coldest winters in the last 70 years.
