= Ali Haidar (poet) =

Punjabi Sufi poet (1690–1785)

- Born: 1690; Qazi Ghalib, Toba Tek Singh, Punjab (now Punjab, Pakistan)
- Died: 1785 (aged 94–95)
- Resting place: Qazi Ghalib, Toba Tek Singh, Punjab, Pakistan
- Occupation: Poet
- Writing career
- Genres: Abyaat, Si-harfi
- Notable work: Kulliyat-e-Ali Haidar; Majmua-e-Abyaat Ali Haidar

Ali Haidar (Note: Punjabi: علی حیدر) (1690–1785) was an eighteenth-century Punjabi Sufi poet. He spent most of his life writing spiritual verses.

== Biography ==
Ali Haidar was born in 1690 in village Qazi Ghalib near Chauntra Sargana, located in the Pirmahal Tehsil, Toba Tek Singh District of modern-day Punjab, Pakistan. As with most other Punjabi Sufis of the time, Ali Haidar was affiliated to the Qādirī Sufi order, and his humble devotion to the Sayyids shows that he himself was not of Sayyid status. Ali Haidar spent most of his life in the village of his birth, where he died in 1785. He was buried in his village Qazi Ghalib near Sandhilianwali in the Toba Tek Singh District, where his shrine was built.

== Poetry ==
For a long time, Ali Haidar was virtually forgotten. His works were re-discovered and published in 1907 by a Lahore publisher, and the later editions are based on this version. Ali Haidar's verses (abyaat) are in the format of Punjabi bayt and he also wrote six sī-ḥarfī.

Ali Haidar lived during the time of collapse of Mughal power in Punjab, and made occasional references to the resulting upheaval. He condemned the "traitors" who were, according to the poet, offering wealth to the foreign raiders from Persia and Khurasan.

=== Poetic works ===
- Qissa Heer Ranjha
- Misc Poetry
- Si-harfian
