= PP-123 Toba Tek Singh-V =

Constituency of the Punjabi Provincial Legislature, Pakistan

- Constituency for the Provincial Assembly of Punjab
- Region: Kamalia Tehsil and Pir Mahal Tehsil (partly) of Toba Tek Singh District

Current constituency
- Created from: PP-88 Toba Tek Singh-V and PP-89 Toba Tek Singh-VI (2002-2018); PP-122 Toba Tek Singh-V (2018-2023)

PP-123 Toba Tek Singh-V (پی پی-123، ٹوبہ ٹیک سنگھ-5) is a constituency of Provincial Assembly of Punjab in Pakistan.

== General elections 2024 ==
Provincial election 2024: PP-123 Toba Tek Singh-V
Party	Candidate	Votes	%	±%
Independent	Ashifa Riaz Fatyana (Note: Filed nomination papers as PTI candidate but ECP allowed him to run as an Independent)	51,785	34.25	
Independent	Shahid Iqbal	33,270	22.00	
Independent	Khushi Muhammad	24,788	16.39	
PML(N)	Nazia Raheel	21,424	14.17	
TLP	Muhammad Shahzaeb	6,266	4.14	
Independent	Asif Abbas Kathia	4,731	3.13	
PPP	Fareed Abbas	4,187	2.77	
Others	Others (twenty five candidates)	4,763	3.15	
Turnout		159,322	57.65	
Total valid votes		151,214	94.91	
Rejected ballots		8,108	5.09	
Majority		18,515	12.25	
Registered electors		276,342		
hold				

== General elections 2018 ==
Provincial election 2018: PP-122 Toba Tek Singh-V
Party	Candidate	Votes	%	±%
PTI	Ashifa Riaz Fatyana	63,924	50.08	
PML(N)	Nazia Raheel	44,739	35.05	
TLP	Ahmad Shahzad Shah	10,625	8.32	
Independent	Yasir Altaf	1,754	1.37	
AAT	Muhammad Irfan Aslam	1,313	1.03	
PPP	Zahoor ul Haq	1,285	1.01	
Others	Others (seventeen candidates)	3,999	3.14	
Turnout		131,509	59.41	
Total valid votes		151,214	97.06	
Rejected ballots		3,870	2.94	
Majority		19,185	15.03	
Registered electors		221,343		

== General elections 2013 ==
Provincial election 2013: PP-88 Toba Tek Singh-V
Party	Candidate	Votes	%	±%
PML(N)	Nazia Raheel	37,216	39.68	
Independent	Ashifa Riaz Fatyana	30,346	32.36	
PPP	Saadat Hasnain Khan	17,642	18.81	
PTI	Rai Ali Qasim Khan	2,766	2.95	
Independent	Sajida Abbas	1,366	1.46	
Independent	Sardar Zia Ullah Dogar	1,292	1.38	
Others	Others (twenty eight candidates)	3,151	3.36	
Turnout		96,886	65.41	
Total valid votes		93,779	96.79	
Rejected ballots		3,107	3.21	
Majority		6,870	7.32	
Registered electors		148,122		

== General elections 2008 ==
Contesting candidates	Party affiliation	Votes polled

== See also ==
- PP-122 Toba Tek Singh-IV
- PP-124 Toba Tek Singh-VI
