= Abdul Qadeer Alvi =

Pakistani politician

Member of the Provincial Assembly of the Punjab
- In office 15 August 2018 – 14 January 2023
- Constituency: PP-119 Toba Tek Singh-II
- In office 29 May 2013 – 31 May 2018

Personal details
- Born: 14 February 1963 (age 63) Gojra Tehsil, Punjab, Pakistan
- Party: PMLN (2013-present)

Abdul Qadeer Alvi is a Pakistani politician who had been a member of the Provincial Assembly of the Punjab, from May 2013 to May 2018 and from August 2018 till January 2023.

== Early life and education ==
He was born on 14 February 1963 in Gojra Tehsil.

He has completed Intermediate level education.

== Political career ==
He was elected to the Provincial Assembly of the Punjab as a candidate of Pakistan Muslim League (N) (PML-N) from Constituency PP-85 (Toba Tek Singh-II) in the 2013 Pakistani general election.

He was re-elected to Provincial Assembly of the Punjab as a candidate of PML-N from Constituency PP-119 (Toba Tek Singh-II) in the 2018 Pakistani general election.
