= Chak 356 =

Chak 356 JB
- Village
- Country: Pakistan
- Province: Punjab
- District: Toba Tek Singh District
- Tehsil: Gojra
- Time zone: UTC+5 (PST)

Chak 356 JB is a village near Gojra in Punjab, Pakistan.
