= Kot Ram Chand =

Kot Ram Chand of Bhattis کوٹ رامم چند Chak #334 JB Numberdar is Muhammad Kashif Imran
- Village
- Location on Jhang road, Pakistan
- Coordinates: 31°20′06″N 72°46′08″E
- Country: Pakistan
- Province: Punjab

Kot Ram Chand (Urdu: کوٹ رام چند) is a village in Pakistan on the M4 motorway, 30 kilometers from Faisalabad. Philanthropist/ Civil Servant & humanitarian Mr. Abdul Jabbar Bhatti(Chief of Bhattis) also belongs to this village. Chak No 334 / J B Tehsildar Wala / Wakeel Wala SHEPHERD-LE INT'L PVT LTD (http://shepherd-le.com/)

Kot Ram Chand is one of the Union Councils of Pakistan, as Chak no.334 J.B Union Council of Gojra Tehsil.
