= Muhammad Ayub Khan Gadhi =

Pakistani politician

Sardar Muhammad Ayub Khan Gadhi

Member of the Provincial Assembly of the Punjab
- In office 15 August 2018 – 14 January 2023
- Constituency: PP-120 Toba Tek Singh-III
- In office 2008 – 31 May 2018
- Constituency: PP-87 (Toba Tek Singh-IV)

Personal details
- Born: 14 March 1961 (age 65) Toba Tek Singh, Punjab, Pakistan
- Party: PMLN (2008-present)

Sardar Muhammad Ayub Khan Gadhi is a Pakistani politician and retired military officer. He is currently serving as a Member of the Provincial Assembly (MPA) of Punjab from PP-122 Toba Tek Singh, marking his fourth consecutive term after being re-elected in the 2024 general elections. He previously held the MPA seat from 2008 to January 2023. He has also served as the Punjab Minister for Counter Terrorism.

== Early life and education ==
He was born on 14 March 1961 in Toba Tek Singh, Punjab, Pkaistan. His maternal uncle was television actor and former Lahore Arts Council deputy director Zubair Khan Baloch.

He has a degree of Bachelor of Arts from Government College University, Lahore and a degree of Bachelor of Laws from Punjab Law College.

He joined Pakistan Army and graduated from Pakistan Military Academy in 1980. In 2002, he retired from the Pakistan Army as Lieutenant Colonel.

== Political career ==
He was elected to the Provincial Assembly of the Punjab as a candidate of Pakistan Muslim League (N) (PML-N) from Constituency PP-87 (Toba Tek Singh-IV) in the 2008 Pakistani general election. He received 46,889 votes and defeated Javed Akram, a candidate of Pakistan Muslim League (Q) (PML-Q).

He was re-elected to the Provincial Assembly of the Punjab as a candidate of PML-N from Constituency PP-87 (Toba Tek Singh-IV) in the 2013 Pakistani general election. He received 53,582 votes and defeated Sardar Khawar Ahmed Khan Gadhi, a candidate of Pakistan Tehreek-e-Insaf (PTI). In January 2017, he was inducted into the Punjab provincial cabinet of Chief Minister Shehbaz Sharif as Provincial Minister of Punjab for counter terrorism.

He was re-elected to Provincial Assembly of the Punjab as a candidate of PML-N from Constituency PP-120 (Toba Tek Singh-III) in the 2018 Pakistani general election. In general elections 2024, he was re-elected as an MPA from PP-122, securing a fourth consecutive term.
