= PP-124 Toba Tek Singh-VI =

Constituency of the Punjabi Provincial Legislature, Pakistan

- Constituency for the Provincial Assembly of Punjab
- Region: Pir Mahal Tehsil (partly) of Toba Tek Singh District

Current constituency
- Created from: PP-89 Toba Tek Singh-VI and PP-90 Toba Tek Singh-VII (2002-2018); PP-123 Toba Tek Singh-VI (2018-2023)

PP-124 Toba Tek Singh-VI (پی پی-124، ٹوبہ ٹیک سنگھ-6) is a Constituency of Provincial Assembly of Punjab, in Pakistan.

== General elections 2024 ==
Provincial election 2024: PP-124 Toba Tek Singh-VI
Party	Candidate	Votes	%	±%
Independent	Sonia (Note: Filed nomination papers as PTI candidate but ECP allowed him to run as an Independent)	62,241	46.97	
PML(N)	Syed Qutab Ali Shah	56,248	42.45	
TLP	Muhammad Latif	4,464	3.37	
Independent	Saima Ali Raza	2,280	1.72	
Others	Others (eighteen candidates)	7,284	5.49	
Turnout		138,859	59.48	
Total valid votes		132,517	95.43	
Rejected ballots		6,342	4.57	
Majority		5,993	4.52	
Registered electors		233,445		
hold				

== General elections 2018 ==
Provincial election 2018: PP-123 Toba Tek Singh-VI
Party	Candidate	Votes	%	±%
PTI	Sonia	52,132	41.31	
PML(N)	Syed Qutab Ali Shah	52,123	41.30	
Independent	Irfan Ul Hassan Chaudhary	17,854	14.15	
Independent	Syed Irfan Raza	1,808	1.43	
Others	Others (fourteen candidates)	2,282	1.81	
Turnout		132,931	61.12	
Total valid votes		126,204	94.94	
Rejected ballots		6,727	5.06	
Majority		9	0.01	
Registered electors		217,499		

== General elections 2013 ==
Provincial election 2013: PP-90 Toba Tek Singh-VII
Party	Candidate	Votes	%	±%
PML(N)	Mian Muhammad Rafique	46,679	47.39	
PTI	Saeed Ahmed Saeedi	42,719	43.37	
PPP	Amjad Hussain Khalid	5,714	5.80	
PNML	Munawar Hussain	2,432	2.47	
Others	Others (eight candidates)	965	0.98	
Turnout		101,617	65.53	
Total valid votes		98,509	96.94	
Rejected ballots		3,108	3.06	
Majority		3,960	4.02	
Registered electors		155,069		

== General elections 2008 ==
Contesting candidates	Party affiliation	Votes polled

== See also ==
- PP-123 Toba Tek Singh-V
- PP-125 Jhang-I
