= Faisalabad (disambiguation) =

Faisalabad is a city in Pakistan. It may also refer to:

== Geography ==
- Faisalabad District, a district of Punjab, Pakistan.
- Faisalabad tehsil, a tehsil of the Faisalabad District.
- Faisalabad Division, an administrative unit of Punjab, Pakistan.

== Sports ==
- Faisalabad cricket team, a first-class domestic cricket team representing Faisalabad
- Faisalabad Wolves, a cricket team in the Faysal Bank T20 Cup
