= Toba Tek Singh District =

District in Punjab, Pakistan

Coordinates: 30°58′N 72°29′E

Toba Tek Singh District Punjabi: ضِلَع ٹوبھا ٹیک سن٘گھ Urdu: ضِلَع ٹوبہ ٹیک سن٘گھ
- District of Punjab
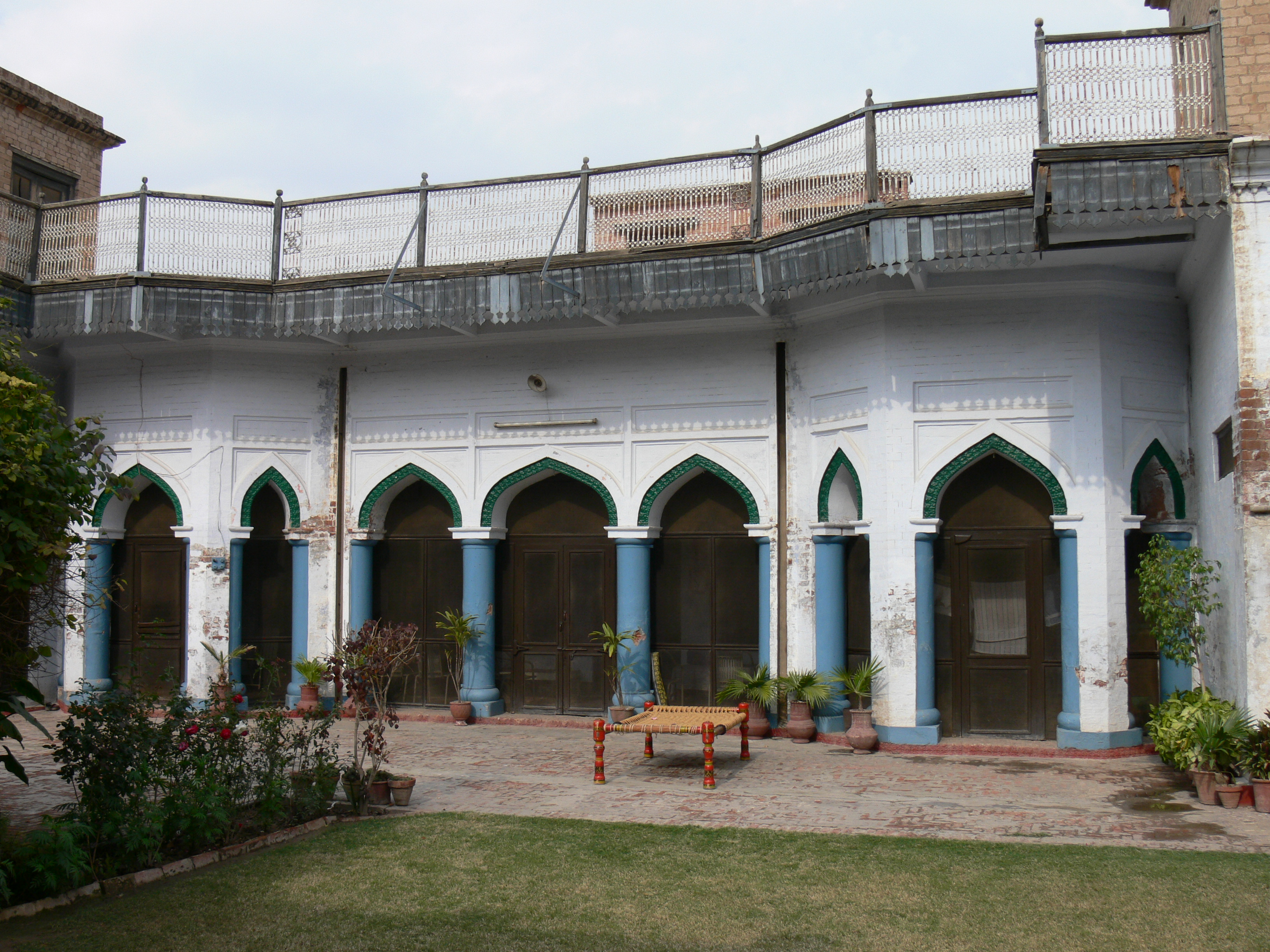
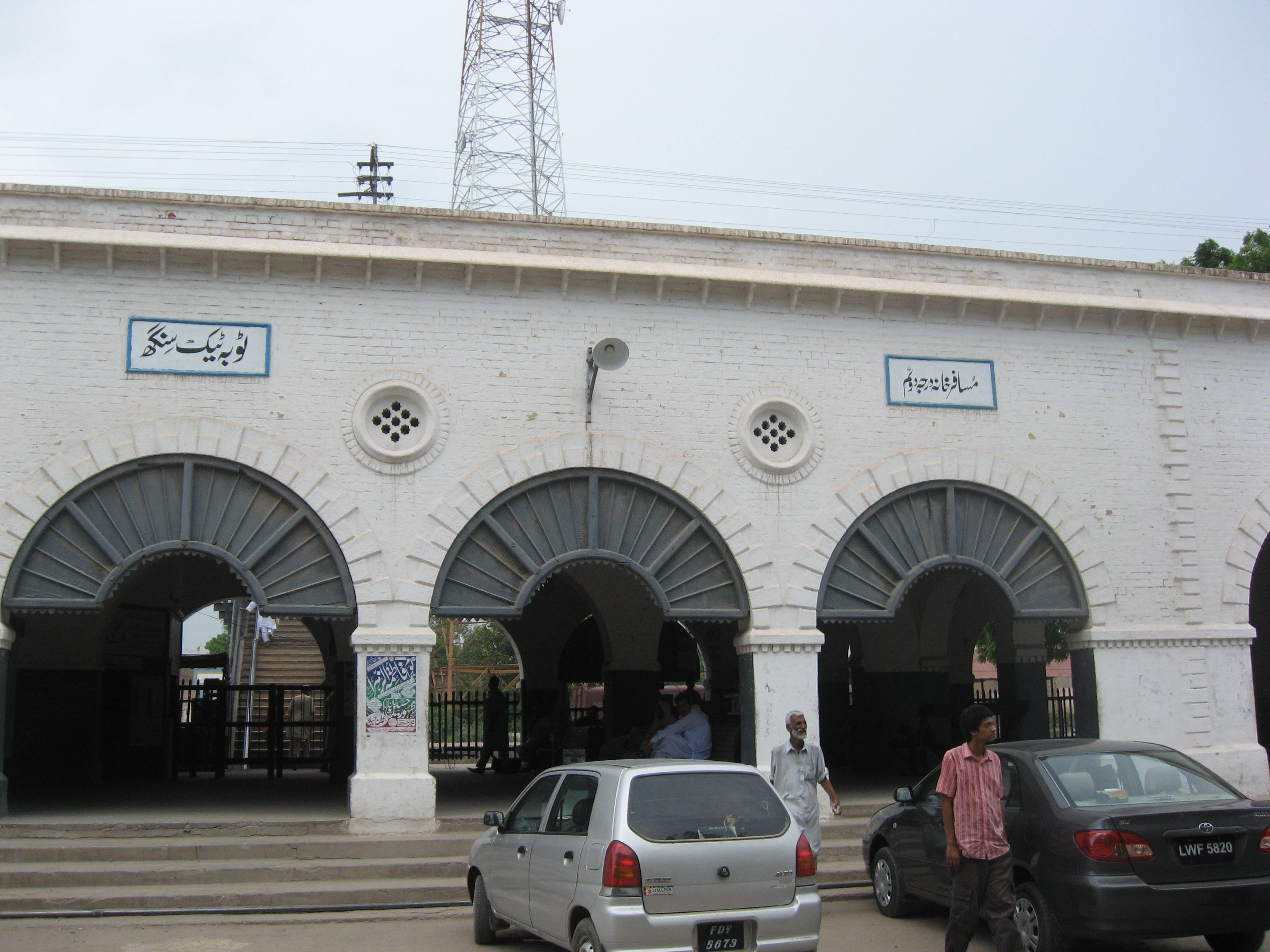
- Top: A haveli in Toba Tek Singh District; Bottom: Toba Tek Singh railway station

- Map of Toba Tek Singh District in Punjab.
- Country: Pakistan
- Province: Punjab
- Division: Faisalabad
- Headquarters: Toba Tek Singh

Government
  - Type: District Administration
  - Deputy Commissioner: N/A
  - District Police Officer: N/A
  - District Health Officer: N/A

Area
  - District of Punjab: 4,364 km^{2} (1,685 sq mi)

Population (2023)
  - District of Punjab: 2,524,044
  - Density: 578.4/km^{2} (1,498/sq mi)
  - Urban: 563,525
  - Rural: 1,960,519

Literacy
  - Literacy rate: Total: (71.38%); Male: (76.37%); Female: (66.13%)
- Time zone: UTC+5 (PST)
- Area code: 046
- Number of Tehsils: 4
- Website: tobateksingh.punjab.gov.pk

Toba Tek Singh District (Punjabi: ضلع ٹوبھا ٹیک سنگھ, Urdu: ضلع ٹوبہ ٹیک سنگھ), is a district of Faisalabad division in the Punjab province of Pakistan. It is located between 30°33' to 31°2' Degree north latitudes and 72°08' to 72°48' Degree longitudes. It became a separate district in 1982.

== Etymology ==
The city and district is named after a sikh figure Tek Singh. Legend has it that Tek Singh, a kind-hearted man served water and provided shelter to the worn out and thirsty travelers passing by a small pond (Toba in Punjabi) which eventually was called Toba Tek Singh, and the surrounding settlement acquired the same name. There is also a park here named after Singh.

== History ==
=== British Raj ===
Toba Tek Singh was developed by the British toward the end of the 19th Century when a canal system was built. People from all over the Punjab (from the current Pakistani and Indian Punjab) moved there as farmlands were allotted to them. Most of the people who migrated there belonged to Lahore, Jalandhar ,Hoshiarpur and Sialkot districts.

The Imperial Gazetteer of India described the tehsil of Toba Tek Singh as follows:

Tehsil of the new Lyallpur District, Punjab, lying between 30°50' and 31°23' N. and 72° 20' and 72°54' E., with an area of 865 square miles (2,240 km^{2}). The population in 1906 was 148,984. It contains 342 villages, including Toba Tek Singh (population, 1,874), the headquarters, and Gojra (2,589), an important grain market on the Wazirabad-Khanewal branch of the North-Western Railway. The land revenue in 1905-6 amounted to Rupees 470,000. The tehsil consists of a level plain, wholly irrigated by the Chenab Canal. The soil, which is very fertile in the east of the tehsil, becomes sandy towards the west. The boundaries of the tehsil were somewhat modified at the time of the formation of the new District of Faisalabad (formerly called Lyallpur).

The predominantly Muslim population supported Muslim League and Pakistan Movement. After the creation of Pakistan in 1947, the minority Hindus and Sikhs migrated to India while the Muslim refugees from eastern Punjab settled in the Toba Tek Singh District.

=== After independence ===
The present Toba Tek Singh district was a Tehsil of Lyallpur District which was given the status of a district by the Punjab government in 1982 and Gojra and Kamalia became new Tehsils. In 2013 Pir Mahal was also given the status of Tehsil.

After the creation of Pakistan, when many Pakistani cities were renamed to names more acceptable to the local population, Toba Tek Singh was one of the few cities that retained its original name.

==== Kisan conference 1970 ====
In Toba Tek Singh, the left parties held a farmers' conference on 23–25 March 1970, which was led by Maulana Bhashani. In this historic farmers' conference, 200,000 farmers and progressives from across the country gathered at the Toba Tek Sangh. This conference had a great impact on the political history of Pakistan. The farmers' conference made Toba Tek Singh famous in the country. Toba Tek Singh was chosen to host the farmers' conference because it was not only an important agricultural area but also had left-wing ideological leaders present before the partition of India.

== Demography ==
Toba Tek Singh is located in center of Punjab and occupies 3252 square kilometers and is made up of large areas of lowlands that flood frequently during the rainy season; the floods originate from the Ravi River that runs along the southern and southeastern borders. During the British Raj, Toba Tek Singh had a sizeable Hindu and Sikh population, much of which migrated to India after the partition in 1947, while many Muslim refugees from present-day India settled in the Toba Tek Singh District.

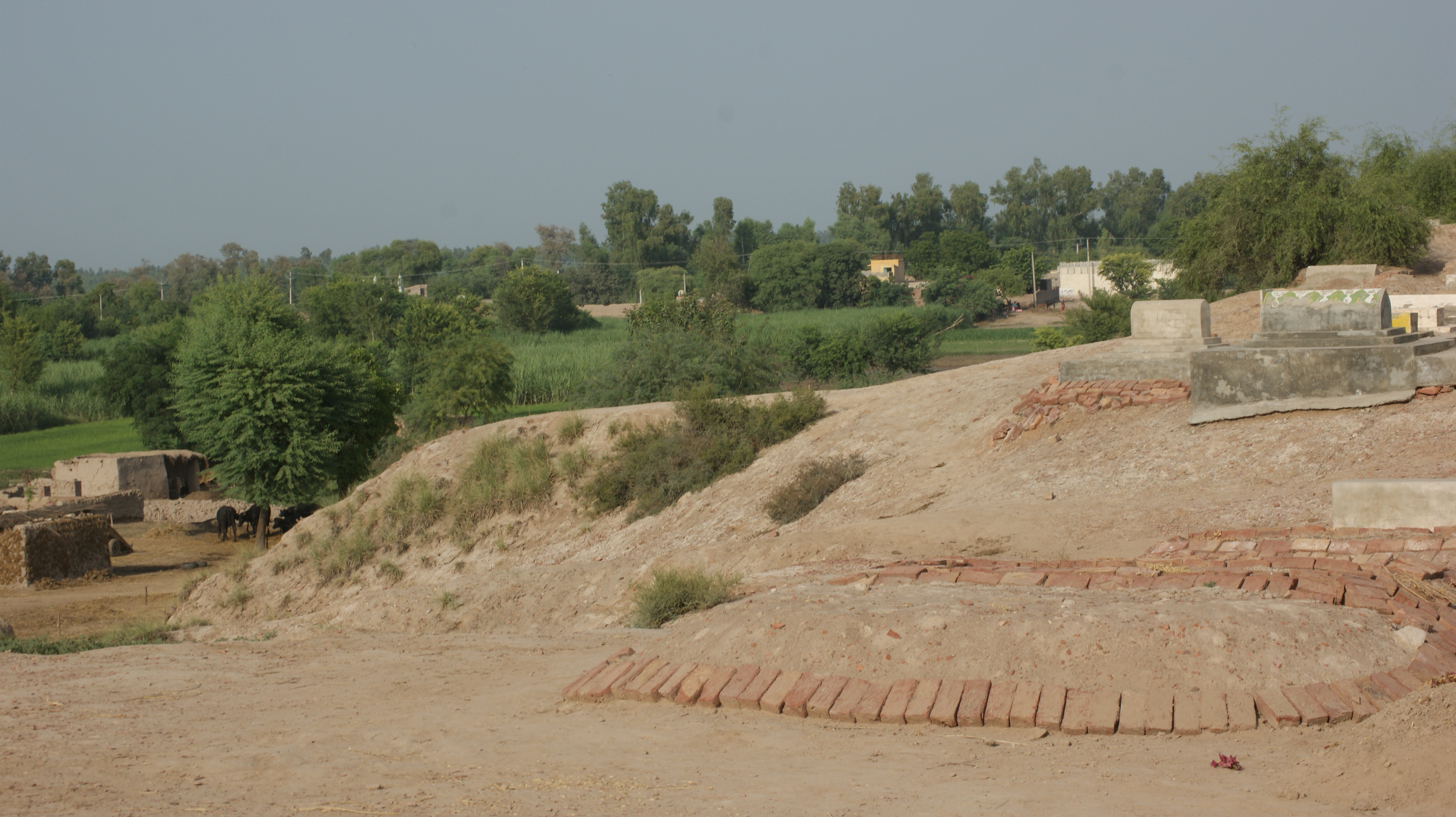
Graveyard on the top of Wanger Wala Tibba

=== Population ===
Historical population
Year	Pop.	±% p.a.
1951	615,582	—
1961	706,800	+1.39%
1972	1,084,442	+3.97%
1981	1,134,572	+0.50%
1998	1,621,593	+2.12%
2017	2,191,495	+1.60%
2023	2,524,044	+2.38%

As of the 2023 census, Toba Tek Singh district has 393,896 households and a population of 2,524,044. The district has a sex ratio of 105.49 males to 100 females and a literacy rate of 71.38%: 76.37% for males and 66.13% for females. 621,491 (24.62% of the surveyed population) are under 10 years of age. 563,525 (22.33%) live in urban areas.

=== Religion ===
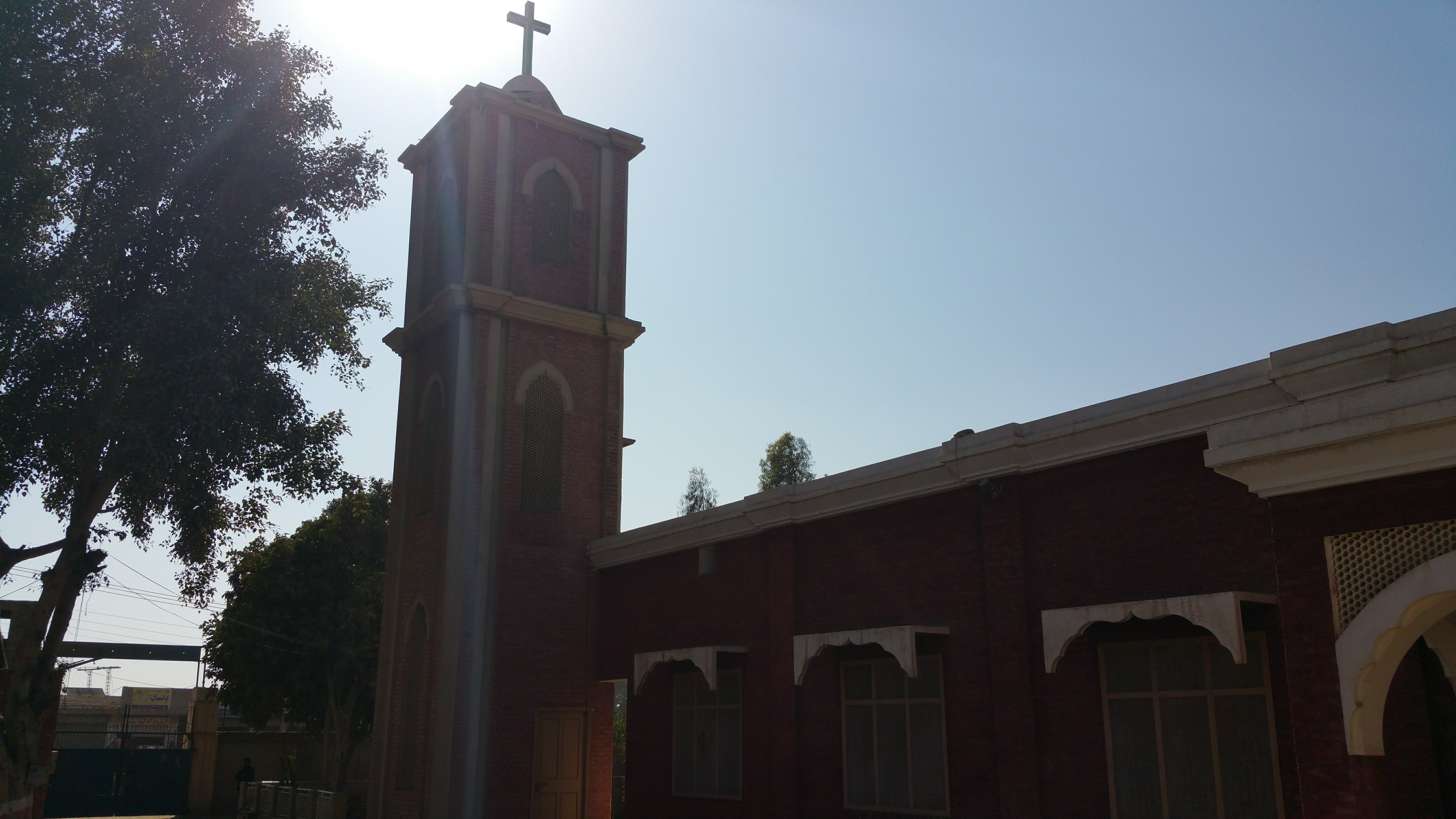
The exterior of Catholic Church, Toba Tek Singh

Religion in Toba Tek Singh district (2023)
Religion	Percent
Islam	96.68%
Christianity	3.22%
Other	0.1%

Religion in contemporary Toba Tek Singh District
Religious group	1941		2017		2023	
Religious group	Pop.	%	Pop.	%	Pop.	%
Islam	271,144	68.40%	2,122,084	96.83%	2,440,350	96.68%
Hinduism	55,575	14.02%	123	0.01%	279	0.01%
Sikhism	53,233	13.43%	—N/a	—N/a	19	~0%
Christianity	16,353	4.13%	66,839	3.05%	81,259	3.22%
Ahmadi	—N/a	—N/a	2,419	0.11%	1,980	0.08%
Others	100	0.02%	30	~0%	157	0.01%
Total Population	396,405	100%	2,191,495	100%	2,524,044	100%
Note: 1941 census data is for Toba Tek Singh tehsil of erstwhile Lyallpur district, which roughly corresponds to contemporary Toba Tek Singh District. District and tehsil borders have changed since 1941.

=== Language ===
Languages of Toba Tek Singh district (2023)
1. Punjabi (96.2%)
2. Urdu (2.48%)
3. Others (1.32%)

At the time of the 2023 census, 96.20% of the population spoke Punjabi and 2.48% Urdu as their first language.

== Economy ==
As per University of Agriculture, Faisalabad research, after Karachi, Toba Tek Singh is the second hub of poultry products in Pakistan.

=== Agriculture ===
Toba Tek Singh District is one of the best producers of oranges, locally known as Kinnow. It contributes towards export standard quality of oranges and have a major role in the export of oranges from Pakistan. The majority of people living in this district work in agriculture and the region produces several kinds of agricultural and dairy products, including meat, eggs, cotton, maize, several pulses, peaches, guava, tomato, melon, water melon, mangoes, tobacco, onion.

== Administration ==
The district of Toba Tek Singh is administratively subdivided into four tehsils and 144 Union Councils.

Tehsil	Area (km²)	Pop. (2023)	Density (ppl/km²) (2023)	Literacy rate (2023)	Union Councils
Gojra	851	755,579	887.87	74.22%	43
Kamalia	486	422,477	869.29	63.55%	25
Pirmahal	774	496,636	641.65	68.39%	29
Toba Tek Singh	1,141	849,352	744.39	74.45%	47

As per the General election 2024, the district is represented in the National Assembly by three elected MNAs who represent the following constituencies:

Constituency	MNA	Party
NA-105	Usama Hamza	Independent
NA-106	Muhammad Junaid Anwar	Pakistan Muslim League (N)
NA-107	Riaz Fatyana	Independent

As per the Punjab general election 2024, the district is represented in the provincial assembly by six elected MPAs who represent the following constituencies:

Constituency	MPA	Party
PP-119	Asad Zaman	Independent
PP-120	Muhammad Ahsan Ihsan	Independent
PP-121	Amjad Ali Javed	Pakistan Muslim League (N)
PP-122	Muhammad Ayub Khan Gadhi	Pakistan Muslim League (N)
PP-123	Ashifa Riaz Fatyana	Independent
PP-124	Sonia Ali Shah	Independent

Major cities and towns in Toba Tek Singh district are :

- Pir Mahal
- Gojra
- Kamalia
- Rajana
- Sandhilianwali
- Nawan Lahore

== Notable people ==
- Masood Fakhri, (1932 – 6 September 2016), footballer.
- Albela (actor), Pakistani film, TV and stage actor and comedian.
- Amjad Saqib, a philanthropist, social entrepreneur, development practitioner and author.
- Mohammad Haroon, a retired three-star rank admiral in the Pakistan Navy.
- Om Prakash Munjal, a Punjabi Hindu Khatri, chairman of Hero cycles company.
- Sardar Muhammad Chaudhry, Ex-Inspector General, Punjab Police (June 1991 to 1 June 1993).
- Amjad Javed Saleemi, Ex-Inspector General, Punjab Police (October 2018 to April 2019).
- Muhammad Hamza, Former Member of the Senate of Pakistan (PML-N).
- Riaz Fatyana, member National Assembly of Pakistan.
- Muhammad Junaid Anwar , member National Assembly of Pakistan, Minister for Maritime Affairs.
- Chaudhry Mohammad Sarwar, Ex-Governor of Punjab (2013 to 2015, 2018 to 2022), Ex-Member of Parliament (United Kingdom).
- Amjad Ali Javed, member Punjab Assembly.
- Ashifa Riaz Fatyana, MPA (PTI) (Ex-Minister for Women's development), Punjab
- Chaudhary Khalid Javed, EX- MNA (PML-N).
- Asad Ur Rehman, EX- MNA (PML-N).
- Khalil-ur-Rehman Ramday, Former justice of the Supreme Court of Pakistan.
- Nazia Raheel, EX-MPA (PMLN).
- Khalid Ahmed Khan Kharal, EX-MNA (PPPP).
- Shafqat Rasool, Pakistan hockey team player.
- Muhammad Shahbaz, Pakistani field hockey player.
- Muhammad Nadeem, Pakistani field hockey player.
