= PP-121 Toba Tek Singh-III =

Constituency of the Punjabi Provincial Legislature, Pakistan

- Constituency for the Provincial Assembly of Punjab
- Region: Toba Tek Singh Tehsil (partly) including Toba Tek Singh city of Toba Tek Singh District

Current constituency
- Created from: PP-87 Toba Tek Singh-IV (2002-2018); PP-121 Toba Tek Singh-IV (2018-2023)

PP-121 Toba Tek Singh-III (پی پی-121، ٹوبہ ٹیک سنگھ-3) is a constituency of the Provincial Assembly of Punjab, in Pakistan.

== General elections 2024 ==
Provincial election 2024: PP-121 Toba Tek Singh-III
Party	Candidate	Votes	%	±%
PML(N)	Amjad Ali	58,576	39.54	
Independent	Saeed Ahmad (Note: Filed nomination papers as PTI candidate but ECP allowed him to run as an Independent)	58,456	39.46	
Independent	Tanveer Hussain	8,646	5.84	
TLP	Muhammad Shabbir	6,529	4.41	
Independent	Ghulam Mustafa	4,362	2.94	
Independent	Tahir Pervaiz Anjum	3,163	2.14	
JI	Arshad Javed	2,108	1.42	
Others	Others (fourteen candidates)	6,306	4.25	
Turnout		153,209	54.90	
Total valid votes		148,146	96.70	
Rejected ballots		5,063	3.30	
Majority		120	0.09	
Registered electors		279,088		
hold				

== General elections 2018 ==
Provincial election 2018: PP-121 Toba Tek Singh-IV
Party	Candidate	Votes	%	±%
PTI	Saeed Ahmad	62,028	47.02	
PML(N)	Amjad Ali	56,522	42.85	
AWP	Muhammad Zubair	4,601	3.49	
TLP	Muhammad Younas Javed	2,554	1.94	
Independent	Nisar Hussain	1,946	1.48	
Others	Others (thirteen candidates)	4,255	3.22	
Turnout		134,308	59.06	
Total valid votes		131,906	98.21	
Rejected ballots		2,402	1.79	
Majority		5,506	4.17	
Registered electors		227,421		

== General elections 2013 ==
Provincial election 2013 : PP-87 Toba Tek Singh-IV
Party	Candidate	Votes	%	±%
PML(N)	Lt. Col. (R) Sardar Mohammad Ayub Khan	53,582	54.82	
PTI	Sardar Khawar Ahmed Khan Gadhi	36,316	37.16	
PNML	Aitzaz Ahmed Warraich	2,681	2.74	
JUI (F)	Haji Shiekh Abdul Aziz	2,295	2.35	
Others	Others (nine candidates)	2,867	2.93	
Turnout		100,589	64.56	
Total valid votes		97,741	97.17	
Rejected ballots		2,848	2.83	
Majority		17,266	17.66	
Registered electors		155,799		

== General elections 2008 ==
Contesting candidates	Party affiliation	Votes polled

== See also ==
- PP-120 Toba Tek Singh-II
- PP-122 Toba Tek Singh-IV
