= Amjad Ali Javed =

Pakistani politician

Chaudhry Amjad Ali Javed

Member of the Provincial Assembly of the Punjab
- Incumbent
- Assumed office 24 February 2024
- Constituency: PP-121 Toba Tek Singh-III
- In office 29 May 2013 – 31 May 2018
- Constituency: PP-86 Toba Tek Singh-III

Personal details
- Born: 1 February 1965 (age 61) Toba Tek Singh, Punjab, Pakistan
- Party: PMLN (2013-present)

Chaudhry Amjad Ali Javed is a Pakistani politician who has been serving as a Member of the Provincial Assembly of the Punjab since 24 February 2024. He previously held this position from May 2013 to May 2018. He also serves as the District President of PMLN in Toba Tek Singh.

== Early life and education ==
He was born on 1 February 1965 in Toba Tek Singh.

He graduated in commerce in 1985 and received a degree of Master of Arts in political science from University of the Punjab and a degree of Bachelor of Laws from Bahauddin Zakariya University.

== Political career ==
He was elected to the Provincial Assembly of the Punjab as a candidate of Pakistan Muslim League (Nawaz) from Constituency PP-86 (Toba Tek Singh-III) in the 2013 Pakistani general election.
