= PP-119 Toba Tek Singh-I =

Constituency of the Provincial Assembly of Punjab, Pakistan

- Constituency for the Provincial Assembly of Punjab
- Region: Gojra Tehsil (partly) including Nawan Lahore town of Toba Tek Singh District

Current constituency
- Created from: PP-84 Toba Tek Singh-I (2002-2018); PP-118 Toba Tek Singh-I (2018-2023)

PP-119 Toba Tek Singh-I (پی پی-119، ٹوبہ ٹیک سنگھ-1) is a constituency of the Provincial Assembly of Punjab, Pakistan.

== General elections 2024 ==
Provincial election 2024: PP-119 Toba Tek Singh-I
Party	Candidate	Votes	%	±%
Independent	Asad Zaman (Note: Filed nomination papers as PTI candidate but ECP allowed him to run as an Independent)	78,259	52.16	
PML(N)	Uqbah Ali	52,762	35.17	
TLP	Muhammad Saqib	8,903	5.93	
Kissan Ittehad Awami Party	Muhammad Khalid Malik	3,551	2.37	
Others	Others (twelve candidates)	6,562	4.37	
Turnout		152,889	58.39	
Total valid votes		150,037	98.13	
Rejected ballots		2,852	1.67	
Majority		25,497	16.99	
Registered electors		261,842		
hold				

== General elections 2018 ==
Provincial election 2018: PP-118 Toba Tek Singh-I
Party	Candidate	Votes	%	±%
PML(N)	Ch. Khalid Javed Warraich	43,256	34.01	
PTI	Asad Zaman	42,820	33.67	
PNML	Chaudhary Bilal Asghar	29,276	23.02	
TLP	Safdar Ali Wahla	10,201	8.02	
Others	Others (three candidates)	1,628	1.28	
Turnout		132,008	59.69	
Total valid votes		127,181	96.34	
Rejected ballots		4,827	3.66	
Majority		436	0.34	
Registered electors		221,175		

== General elections 2013 ==
Provincial election 2013: PP-84 Toba Tek Singh-I
Party	Candidate	Votes	%	±%
PNML	Bilal Asghar Warraich	26,501	28.21	
Independent	Asad Zaman	22,230	23.66	
PML(N)	Mrs. Fouzia Khalid Warraich	20,288	21.59	
PPP	Sarwat Khalid Malik	12,213	13.00	
PTI	Safdar Ali Wahala	8,072	8.59	
TTP	Azhar Abbas	3,194	3.40	
Others	Others (eight candidates)	1,458	1.55	
Turnout		97,765	65.77	
Total valid votes		93,956	96.10	
Rejected ballots		3,809	3.90	
Majority		4,271	4.55	
Registered electors		148,649		

== See also ==
- PP-118 Faisalabad-XXI
- PP-120 Toba Tek Singh-II
