= Painsra =

Town in Faisalabad District, Pakistan

Painsra پینسرہ
- Town
- Location on Jhang road, Pakistan Painsra (Pakistan)
- Coordinates: 31°20′40″N 72°49′11″E
- Country: Pakistan
- Province: Punjab
- District: Faisalabad District

Painsra (Urdu: پینسرہ, Punjabi: پینسرا) is a town of Faisalabad District in Punjab, Pakistan. It is located on Jhang Road about 30 km from Bhawana city, 49 km from Jhang and 25 km from Faisalabad.

== See also ==
- Bhawana City
- Jhang District
