= Tek Singh =

Tek Singh was a Risaldar and had a Jagir in the reign of Maharaja Ranjit Singh. Toba Tek Singh, a city in the Punjab, Pakistan, is named after him.

He was said to be a kind-hearted man who served water and provided shelter to the worn out and thirsty travelers passing by a pond (toba in Punjabi) which eventually was called Toba Tek Singh.
