= PP-122 Toba Tek Singh-IV =

Constituency of the Punjabi Provincial Legislature, Pakistan

- Constituency for the Provincial Assembly of Punjab
- Region: Toba Tek Singh Tehsil (partly) of Toba Tek Singh District

Current constituency
- Created from: PP-86 Toba Tek Singh-III (2002-2018); PP-120 Toba Tek Singh-III (2018-2023)

PP-122 Toba Tek Singh-IV (پی پی-122، ٹوبہ ٹیک سنگھ-4) is a constituency of Provincial Assembly of Punjab, in Pakistan.

== General elections 2024 ==
Provincial election 2024: PP-122 Toba Tek Singh-IV
Party	Candidate	Votes	%	±%
PML(N)	Muhammad Ayub Khan	69,538	46.01	
Independent	Khawar Ahmad Khan (Note: Filed nomination papers as PTI candidate but ECP allowed him to run as an Independent)	69,250	45.82	
TLP	Muhammad Farukh Shahzad	5,907	3.91	
JI	Atta Ullah Arshad	2,551	1.69	
Others	Others (fifteen candidates)	3,901	2,57	
Turnout		156,241	57.12	
Total valid votes		151,147	96.74	
Rejected ballots		5,094	3.26	
Majority		288	0.19	
Registered electors		273,538		
hold				

== General elections 2018 ==
Provincial election 2018: PP-120 Toba Tek Singh-III
Party	Candidate	Votes	%	±%
PML(N)	Muhammad Ayub Khan	71,527	50.55	
PTI	Javed Akram	55,357	39.12	
Independent	Khawar Ahmad Khan	8,785	6.21	
TLP	Mujahid Ramzan	2,230	1.58	
MMA	Abdul Aziz	1,551	1.40	
Others	Others (five candidates)	2,049	1.45	
Turnout		144,818	59.73	
Total valid votes		141,499	97.71	
Rejected ballots		3,319	2.29	
Majority		16,170	11.43	
Registered electors		242,442		

== General elections 2013 ==
Provincial election 2013: PP-86 Toba Tek Singh-III
Party	Candidate	Votes	%	±%
PML(N)	Amjad Ali Javaid	40,655	42.27	
PTI	Chaudhry Saeed Akbar	19,308	20.08	
JI	Doctor Zahid Sattar	11,151	11.59	
Independent	Nisar Hussain Chaudhry	6,507	6.77	
PNML	Chaudry Akbar Ali Warriach	4,185	4.35	
PPP	Aamir Jabbar Chaudhary	3,990	4.15	
Independent	Muhammad Abbas	2,230	2.32	
AWP	Farooq Tariq	1,830	1.90	
Independent	Muhammad Afzal Cheema	1,596	1.66	
MWM	Fida Hussain Rana	1,586	1.65	
Others	Others (sixteen candidates)	3,137	3.26	
Turnout		99,542	63.61	
Total valid votes		96,175	96.62	
Rejected ballots		3,367	3.38	
Majority		21,347	22.19	
Registered electors		156,477		

== General elections 2008 ==
Contesting candidates	Party affiliation	Votes polled

== See also ==
- PP-121 Toba Tek Singh-III
- PP-123 Toba Tek Singh-V
