= Toba Tek Singh (short story) =

- Short story by Saadat Hasan Manto
- Country: Pakistan
- Language: Urdu
- Genre: Satire

Publication
- Publication date: 1955

"Toba Tek Singh" (Urdu: ٹوبہ ٹیک سنگھ ALA-LC: Ṭobah Țek Siṉgh IPA: [ʈoːbəh ʈeːk sɪŋɡʱ]) is a short story written by Saadat Hasan Manto and published in 1955. It follows inmates in a Lahore asylum, some of whom are to be transferred to India following the 1947 Partition. According to a personal essay hosted at Columbia University by a scholar-in-training of Urdu literature, the story is a "powerful satire, and also a bitter indictment of the political processes and behavior patterns that produced [India's] Partition".

== Plot summary ==
The story is set two or three years after the 1947 partition, when the governments of India and Pakistan decided to exchange some Muslim, Sikh and Hindu lunatics, and revolves around Bishan Singh, a Sikh inmate of an asylum in Lahore, who is from the town of Toba Tek Singh that has become part of Pakistan after the partition. As part of the exchange, Bishan Singh is sent under police escort to India, but upon being told that his hometown Toba Tek Singh is in Pakistan, he refuses to go. The story ends with Bishan lying down in the no man's land between the two barbed wire fences: "There, behind barbed wire, was Hindustan. Here, behind the same kind of barbed wire, was Pakistan. In between, on that piece of ground that had no name, lay Toba Tek Singh."

== Bishan Singh's mutterings ==
In the story, whenever Bishan Singh gets irritated he mutters or shouts a mix of Punjabi, Urdu and English which, though nonsensical, is indirectly pejorative of both India and Pakistan. For instance, "Upar di gur gur di annexe di bedhiyana di moong di daal of di Pakistan and Hindustan of di durr phitey mun", which means: "The inattention of the annexe of the rumbling upstairs of the dal of moong of the Pakistan and India of the go to bloody hell!"

== Adaptations ==
In 2006, Sarmad Sehbai adapted Toba Tek Singh, which aired on Pakistan Television on 3 December 2006.

A film based on a play adaptation of this story was made in 2005 by Afia Nathaniel. A short film named Toba Tek Singh was released in 2018 in India. This film is directed by Ketan Mehta.

== In popular culture ==
On the 60th anniversary of Partition, the Pakistani theatre group Ajoka, as part of a series of plays and performances, performed a play adaptation in India. It was described as a "commentary on the state of affairs between the two countries, where sub-committees, committees and ministerial-level talks are the panacea for all problems".

In 2017, Naatak, America's Biggest Indian Theater, staged a grand musical based on the story. Staged at the Woodside Theater, with original music composed by Nachiketa Yakkundi of the RSV School of Music and dance choreographed by Shaira Bhan and Snigdha Singh of Dance Identity. The musical was written and directed by Sujit Saraf and is available to stream anytime.

In 2018, the British Broadcasting Corporation named the work among the 100 stories that shaped the world, alongside works by authors like Homer and Virginia Woolf.

The 2018 biographical film Manto featured the popular rant of the main protagonist in Toba Tek Singh. It is one of the five short stories by Manto that are featured in the film.

In 2020, British Pakistani rapper Riz Ahmed released a song titled "Toba Tek Singh" on his album A Long Goodbye, and there are multiple references in his film Mogul Mowgli.
