= Constituency PP-89 (Toba Tek Singh-VI) =

Former constituency of the Punjabi Provincial Legislature, Pakistan

PP-89 Toba Tek Singh-VI
- Former constituency for the Provincial Assembly of Punjab

Former constituency
- Abolished: 2018

PP-89 Toba Tek Singh-VI was a Constituency of Provincial Assembly of Punjab.It was abolished after 2018 delimitations. Toba Tek Singh District lost 1 constituency after 2017 Census.

== See also ==
- Punjab, Pakistan
