= Sandhilianwali =

Town in Punjab, Pakistan

Sandilianwali / Sandhilianwali سندھیلیانوالی/ سندیلیانوالی
- Interactive map of Sandilianwali / Sandhilianwali سندھیلیانوالی/ سندیلیانوالی
- Country: Pakistan
- Province: Punjab
- Elevation: 252 m (827 ft)

Population (1998)
  - Total: 5,000
  - Estimate (2015): 15,000
- Time zone: UTC+5 (PST)
- Calling code: 046

Sandilianwali سندیلیانوالی / Sandhilianwali سندھیلیانوالی is a town of Pir Mahal Tehsil in the Punjab province of Pakistan. It is near the Ravi River.
