= Toba Tek Singh =

City in Punjab, Pakistan

Toba Tek Singh Punjabi: ٹوبھا ٹیک سنگھ Urdu: ٹوبہ ٹیک سنگھ
- City
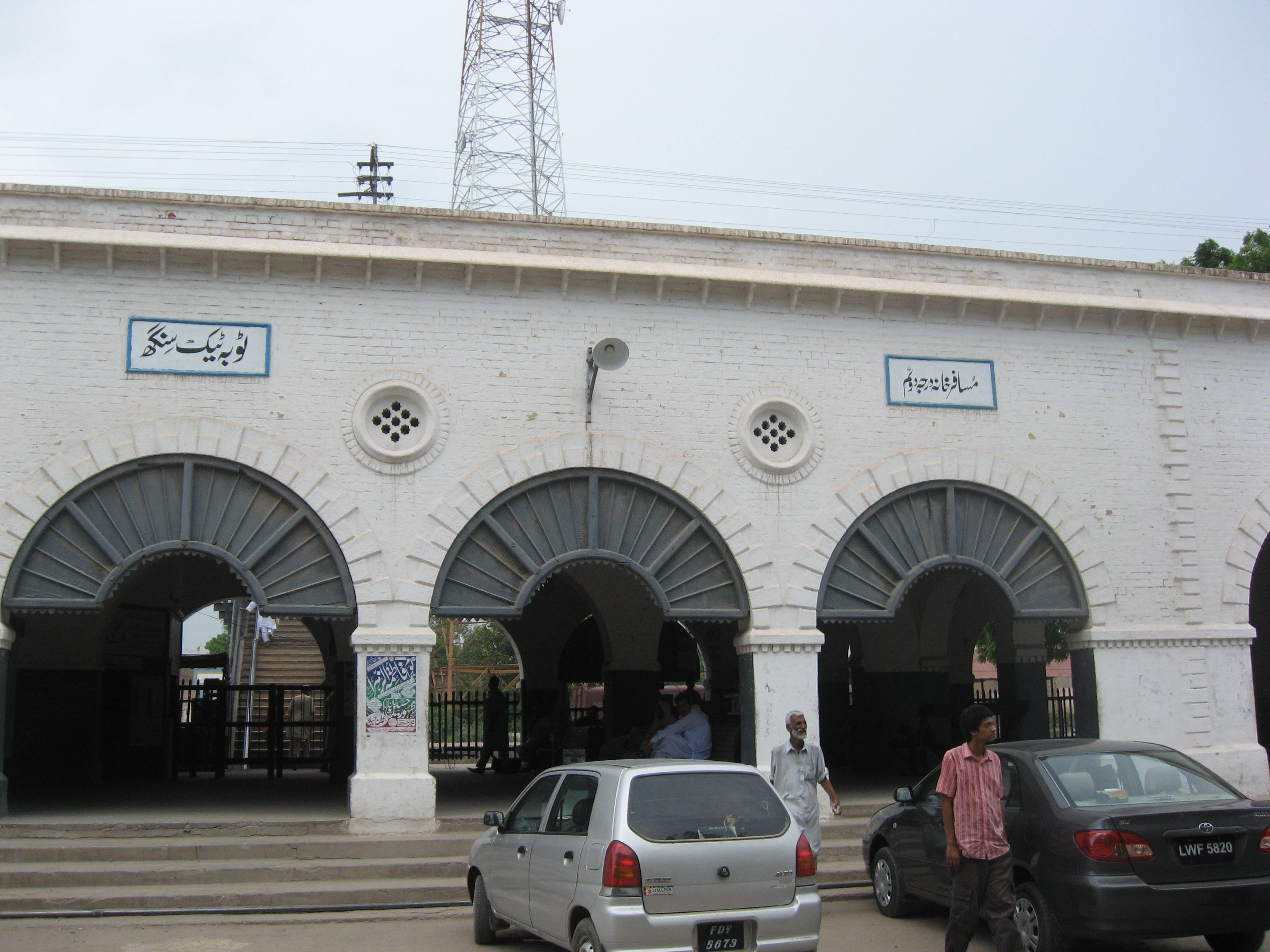
- Toba Tek Singh railway station

- Location within Punjab, Pakistan Location within Pakistan
- Coordinates: 30°58′16″N 72°28′57″E
- Country: Pakistan
- Province: (Punjab, Pakistan) Punjab
- Division: Faisalabad
- District: Toba Tek Singh
- Tehsil: Toba Tek Singh

Area
  - Metro: 3,252 km^{2} (1,256 sq mi)
- Elevation: 149 m (489 ft)

Population (2023)
  - City: 123,102
- Time zone: UTC+5 (PST)
- Postal code: 36050
- Calling code: 046
- Number of Union councils: 32

Toba Tek Singh (Punjabi: ٹوبھا ٹیک سنگھ, Urdu: ٹوبہ ٹیک سنگھ) is a city in Punjab province of Pakistan and capital of Toba Tek Singh District. It is surrounded by cities of Gojra, Kamalia, Rajana, Pir Mahal .

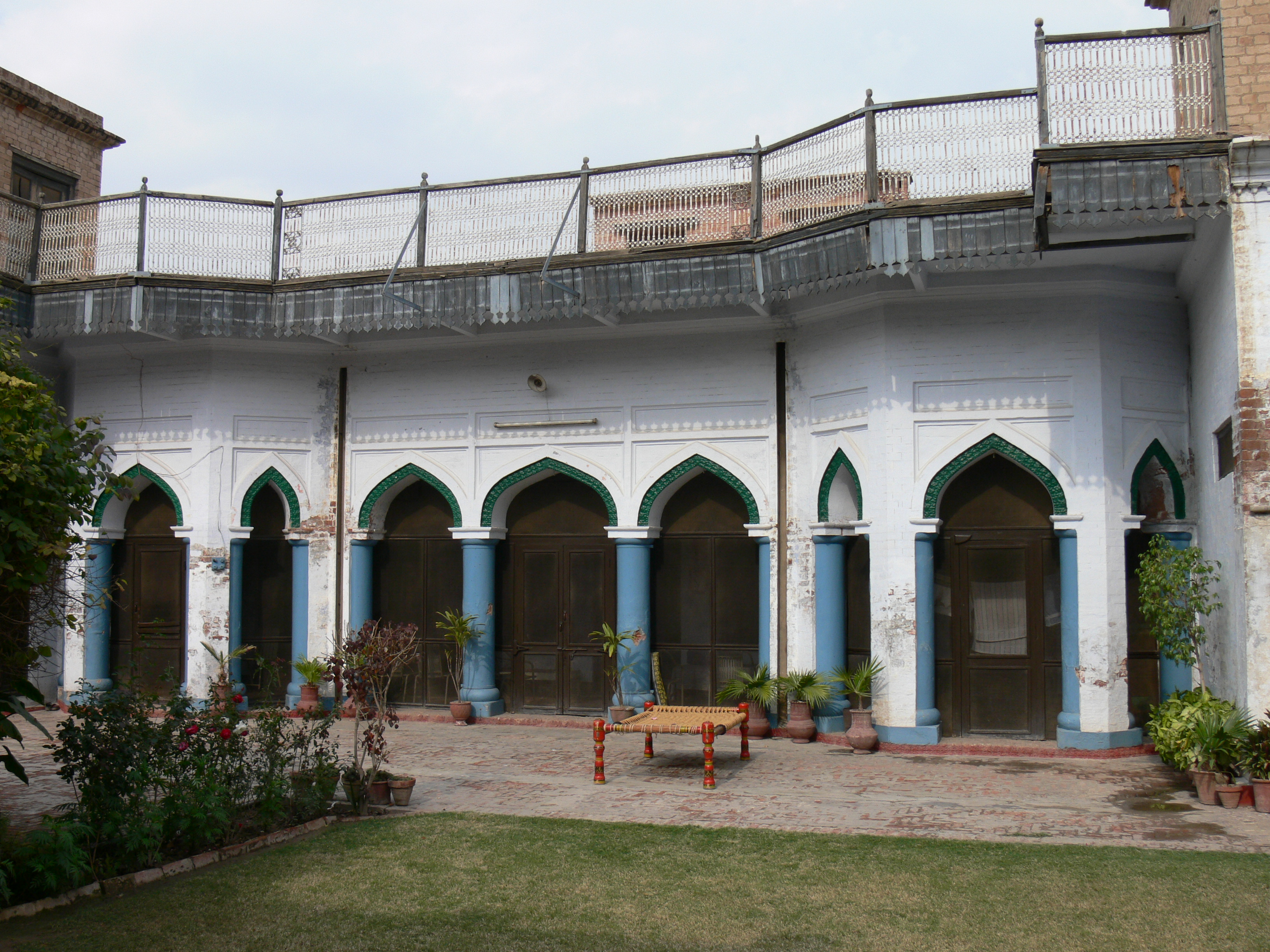
A haveli in Toba Tek Singh district

== History ==
The city and district is named after a Sikh figure Tek Singh. Legend has it that Tek Singh, a kind-hearted man, served water and provided shelter to the worn out and thirsty travelers passing by a small pond (Toba in Punjabi) which eventually was called Toba Tek Singh, and the surrounding settlement acquired the same name.

=== British Raj ===
Toba Tek Singh was developed by the British toward the end of the 19th Century when a canal system was built. People from all over the Punjab moved there as farmlands were allotted to them. Most of the people who migrated there belonged to Lahore, Jalandhar, Hoshiarpur and Sialkot districts. The Imperial Gazetteer of India described the tehsil of Toba Tek Singh as follows:

Tehsil of the new Lyallpur district, Punjab, lying between 30°50' and 31°23' N. and 72° 20' and 72°54' E., with an area of 865 square miles (2,240 km2). The population in 1906 was 148,984. It contains 342 villages, including Toba Tek Singh (population,1,874), the headquarters, and Gojra (2,589), an important grain market on the Wazirabad-Khanewal branch of the North-Western Railway. The land revenue and ceases in 1905-06 amounted to 4.7 lakhs. The tehsil consists of a level plain, wholly irrigated by the Chenab Canal. The soil, which is very fertile in the east of the tahsil, becomes sandy towards the west. The boundaries of the tahsils were somewhat modified at the time of the formation of the new district of Lyallpur.

=== Modern ===
During the 1970s, when many Pakistani cities were renamed to change names given after British Rulers to their original or native names or more acceptable names to local population, for example: Montgomery returned to its original name Sahiwal, Toba Tek Singh remained one of the very few cities to maintain its original name mainly because of reputation of Tek Singh. In 1982 Toba Tek Singh, formerly a subdivision, was separated from Faisalabad District and became a separate district.

==== Kisan conference 1970 ====
In Toba Tek Singh, the Left parties held a farmers' conference on 23–25 March 1970, which was led by Maulana Bhashani. The farmers' conference made Toba Tek Singh famous in the country. Toba Tek Singh was chosen to host the farmers' conference because it was not only an important agricultural area but also had left-wing ideological leaders present before the partition of India.

==== Gas pipeline explosion ====
On the evening of 23 October 1999 SNGPL employees were repairing a 26-inch diameter pipe at the wall assembly station on Jhang Maghiana Road of SNGPL's main pipeline passing through Toba Tek Singh city. An explosion set fire to the assembly station and surrounding houses, burning 13 people, including 11 employees, to death and injuring dozens. The trees that took damage in that fire can still be observed by the gas distribution site near the city stadium.

== Demography ==
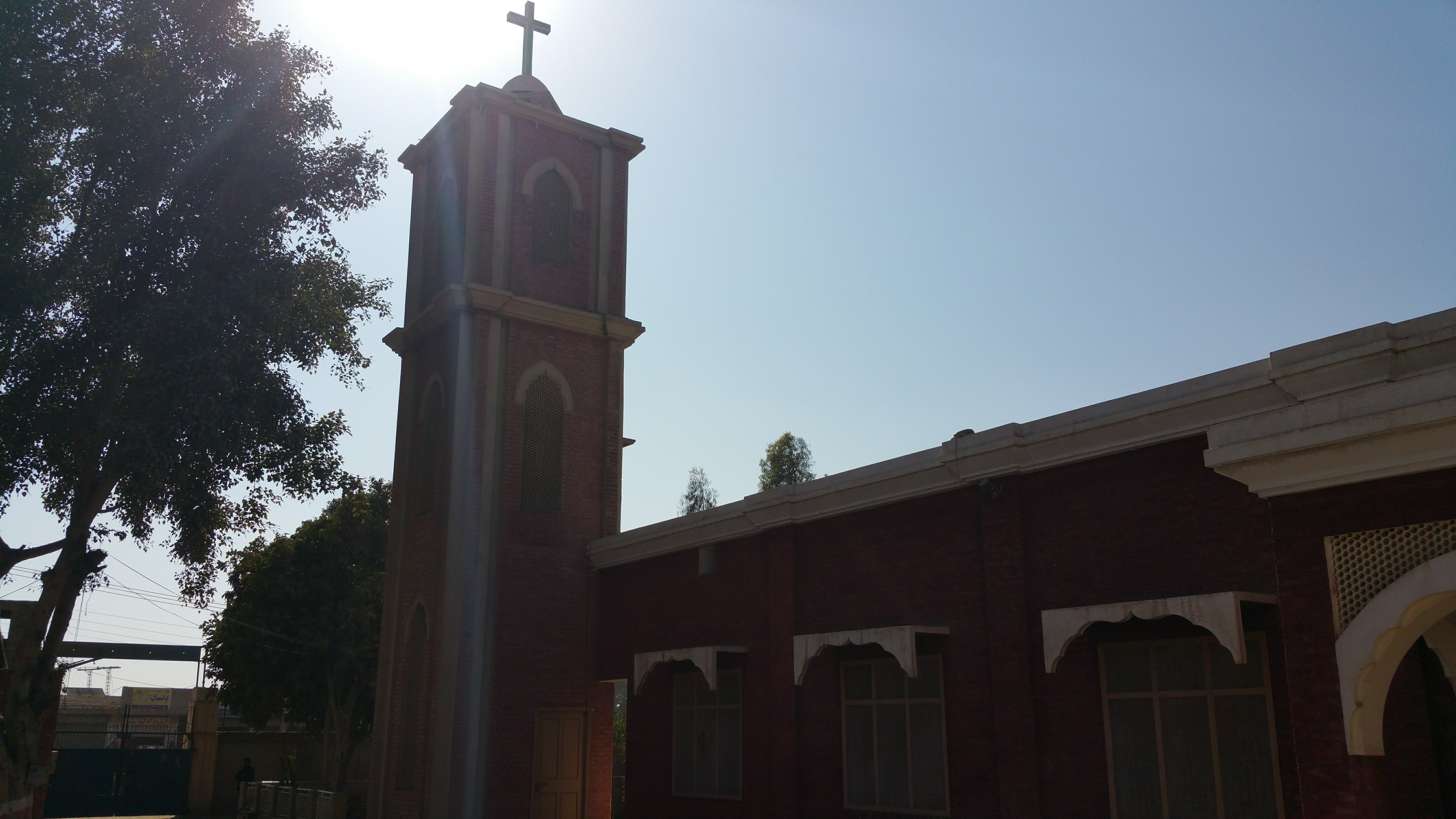
The exterior of Catholic Church, Toba Tek Singh

Toba Tek Singh is located in central Punjab and occupies 3,252 square kilometers and is made up of large areas of lowlands that flood frequently during the rainy season; the floods originate from the Ravi River that runs along the southern and southeastern borders. The pre-partition Toba Tek Singh had a sizable Hindu and Sikh population, much of which migrated to India after the partition in 1947.

=== Population ===
Population of Toba Tek Singh city.

Census Year	Population
1972	28,028
1981	37,844
1998	59,938
2017	87,246
2023	123,102

== Economy ==
=== Agriculture ===
Toba Tek Singh is one of the best producers of oranges, locally known as Kinnow. It contributes towards export standard quality of oranges. The majority of people living in this district work in agriculture and the region produces several kinds of agricultural and dairy products, including meat, eggs, cotton, maize, several pulses, peaches, guava, tomato, melon, water melon, mangoes, tobacco, onion.

== Notable people ==
- Masood Fakhri (1932 – 6 September 2016), footballer
- Sardar Muhammad Chaudhry, Ex-Inspector General, Punjab Police (June 1991 to 1 June 1993).
- Amjad Javed Saleemi, Ex-Inspector General, Punjab Police (October 2018 to April 2019).
- Chaudhry Amjad Ali Javed, member, Punjab Assembly.
- Muhammad Junaid Anwar Chaudhry, member, National Assembly of Pakistan, Minister for Maritime Affairs.
- Shafqat Rasool, a Pakistani field hockey player.
- Aasam Mukhtar Chaudhry Tamgah-e-Shujjat (Gallantry)

== Educational Institutes ==
- Divisional Public School & College, Toba Tek Singh
- Bahria Foundation College, Toba Tek Singh
- Convent of Jesus and Mary High School, Toba Tek Singh. First international established school in Toba Tek Singh by (SIR ARSAL)
- Ken Public High School
- Govt Graduate College, Toba Tek Singh

== In fiction ==
Saadat Hasan Manto, an Urdu language novelist, wrote a short story entitled "Toba Tek Singh" which is a satire on the partition of Punjab; in the story, an inmate in an asylum frets over the question of whether his home town Toba Tek Singh is now in India or Pakistan. It was adapted into a short movie of the same name directed by Pakistani filmmaker Afia Nathaniel in 2005. In 2006, Sarmad Sehbai dramatized "Toba Tek Singh" for Pakistan Television which was aired on Pakistan Television on 3 December 2006 and it was adapted into a film, Partition, by Ken McMullen and Tariq Ali for the British Channel 4 in 1987.

It has also been made into an Indian short film by Ketan Mehta. Rapper Riz Ahmed released a track titled the same name in his 2020 album, "The Long Goodbye".

== See also ==
- Boota from Toba Tek Singh (a popular Pakistani TV drama about a person from Toba Tek Singh)
