= Divisions of Punjab, Pakistan =

Second-level administrative regions of Pakistan

Divisions of Punjab تقسیمات پنجاب (Urdu)
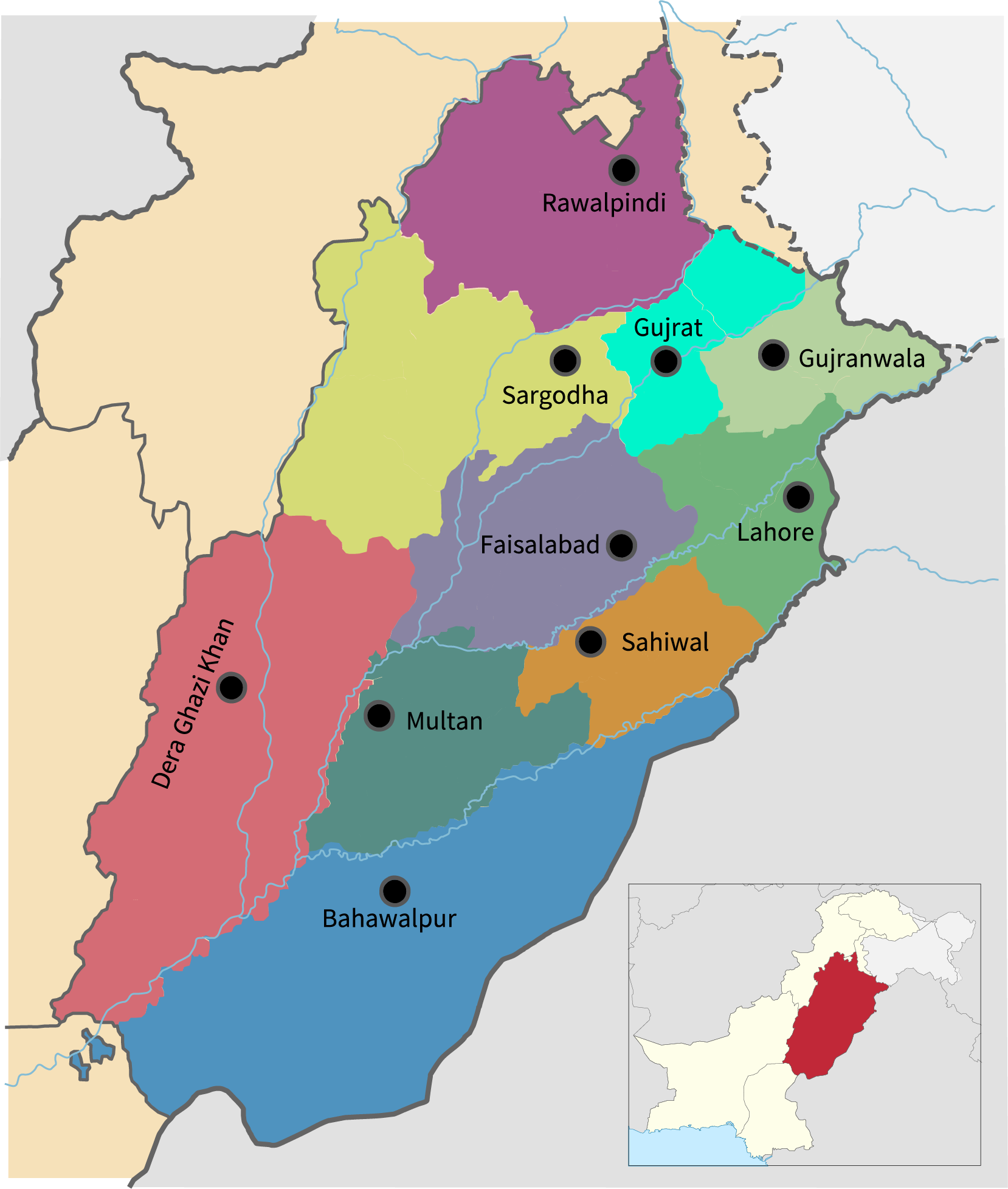
- Map of Divisions of Punjab, Pakistan
- Category: First-level administrative division
- Location: Pakistan
- Found in: Punjab
- Number: 10 (as of 2024)
- Populations: Greatest: Lahore —22,772,710 (2023 census)
- Areas: Largest: Bahawalpur — 45,588 km^{2} (17,602 sq mi); Smallest: Gujranwala —7,779 km^{2} (3,003 sq mi)
- Government: Division Administration
- Subdivisions: Districts; Tehsils; Union councils

The divisions of Punjab (Urdu: تقسیمات پنجاب), are the first-order administrative bodies of the Punjab Province of Pakistan. In total, there are 10 divisions, which are further divided into districts ranging from three to six per division, depending upon area. Divisions are governed by Commissioners while districts are governed by Deputy Commissioners.

== History ==
Administrative divisions had formed an integral tier of government from the times of Mughal Empire and latterly British Raj. The Lahore and Multan Subahs (combinedly Punjab) during Mughal era while Punjab Province during British era were subdivided into divisions, which were themselves subdivided into districts.

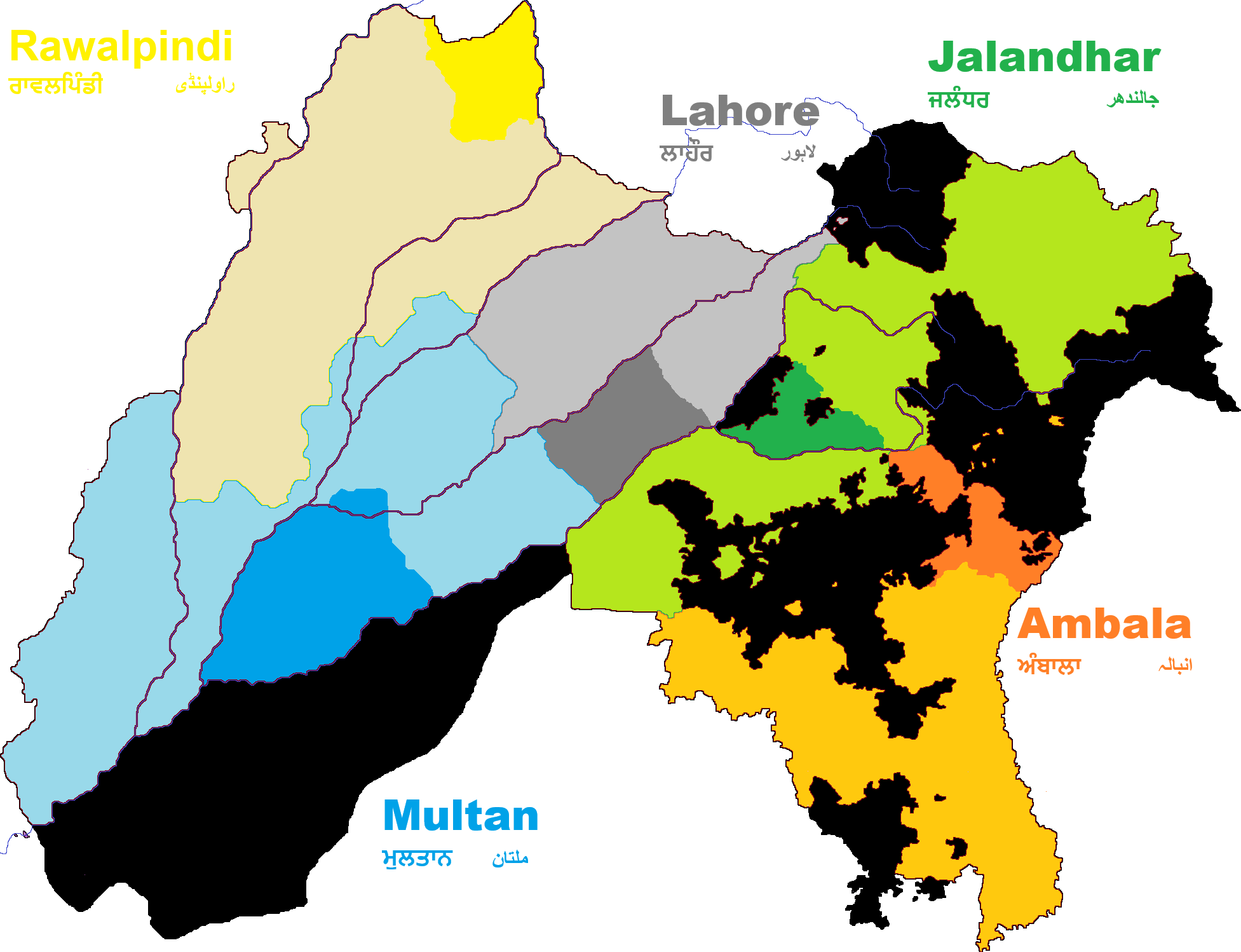
This map shows the British Divisions of Punjab in 1947: yellow is Rawalpindi, blue is Multan, gray is Lahore, green is Jalandhar, and orange is Ambala.

After independence, The province of West Punjab had four divisions – Lahore, Multan, Rawalpindi and Sargodha. From 1955 to 1970, during One Unit policy the Princely State of Bahawalpur was joined with West Punjab and made part of Bahawalpur Division. In the late 1970s new divisions were formed; Gujranwala Division was formed from parts of Lahore and Rawalpindi divisions; Dera Ghazi Khan Division was split from Multan Division; Faisalabad Division was split from Sargodha Division and, with the passage of time, the number of these divisions increased and now there are nine divisions.

On 17 August 2022, Gujrat comprising districts of Gujrat, Mandi Bahauddin, Wazirabad and Hafizabad, was notified as a new division in Punjab Province. However, it was de-notified later in February 2023. It again got divisional status in December 2024.

== Administration ==
Every division of province is divided into many districts and then further into tehsils. Each division is administrated by a commissioner. He is assisted by different deputy commissioners of all districts of his division. The duties of commissioner according to Punjab Government Act 2013 (XVIII of 2013) are as follows:

- He is the officer-in-charge of general administration and principal representative of the government in the division.
- He monitors the discharge of duties by the deputy commissioners in the division.
- He is also responsible to facilitate and coordinate any work which concerns two or more districts in the division.

== List of divisions ==
Name	Headquarters	Districts	Area (km^{2})	Population (2023)	Population Density (2023)	Literacy rate (2023)	Map
Bahawalpur	Bahawalpur	Bahawalpur; Bahawalnagar; Rahim Yar Khan	45,588	13,400,009	293.94/km^{2}	52.13%	
Dera Ghazi Khan	Dera Ghazi Khan	Dera Ghazi Khan; Layyah; Muzaffargarh; Rajanpur; Taunsa; Kot Addu	38,778	12,892,465	332.47/km^{2}	48.00%	
Faisalabad	Faisalabad	Faisalabad; Chiniot; Toba Tek Singh; Jhang	17,918	16,228,526	905.71/km^{2}	68.80%	
Gujranwala	Gujranwala	Gujranwala; Narowal; Sialkot	7,779	11,416,686	937.11/km^{2}	76.41%	
Gujrat	Gujrat	Gujrat; Hafizabad; Mandi Bahauddin; Wazirabad	9,438	7,362,182	670/km^{2}	76.41%	
Lahore	Lahore	Lahore; Kasur; Nankana Sahib; Sheikhupura	11,727	22,772,710	1941.90/km^{2}	73.63%	
Multan	Multan	Multan; Lodhran; Khanewal; Vehari	15,211	14,085,102	925.98/km^{2}	59.43%	
Rawalpindi	Rawalpindi	Rawalpindi; Jhelum; Chakwal; Attock; Murree; Talagang	18,823	10,804,250	574.50/km^{2}	79.9%	
Sahiwal	Sahiwal	Sahiwal; Pakpattan; Okara	10,302	8,533,471	828.33/km^{2}	61.02%	
Sargodha	Sargodha	Sargodha; Bhakkar; Khushab; Mianwali	26,360	9,591,275	263.86/km^{2}	63.19%	

== Proposed Divisions of Punjab Province ==
- Mianwali Division
- Muzaffargarh Division
- Jhelum Division
- Jhang Division
- Sheikhupura Division

== List of divisions by population over the years ==
Division	Population (2023)	Population (2017)	Population (1998)	Population (1981)	Population (1972)	Population (1961)	Population (1951)
Lahore	22,772,710	19,581,281	8,694,620	–	–	–	–
Faisalabad	16,228,526	14,177,081	9,885,685	–	–	–	–
Multan	14,085,102	12,265,161	8,447,557	–	–	–	–
Bahawalpur	13,400,009	11,464,031	7,635,591	–	–	–	–
Dera Ghazi Khan	12,892,465	11,014,398	6,503,590	–	–	–	–
Gujranwala	11,416,686	9,783,183	6,101,052	3,934,861	3,218,873	2,587,061	1,835,178
Rawalpindi	10,804,250	10,007,821	6,659,528	–	–	–	–
Sargodha	9,591,275	8,181,499	5,679,766	–	–	–	–
Sahiwal	8,533,471	7,380,386	5,362,866	–	–	–	–
Gujrat	7,362,182	6,340,801	5,330,006	–	–	–	–

== See also ==
- Divisions of Pakistan
- Districts of Punjab, Pakistan
- List of tehsils of Punjab, Pakistan
