= Pir Mahal =

Town in Punjab, Pakistan

- City
- پیر محل
- Location within Punjab, Pakistan Location within Pakistan
- Coordinates: 30°45′50″N 72°25′52″E
- Country: Pakistan
- Province: Punjab
- Division: Faisalabad
- District: Toba Tek Singh
- Elevation: 152 m (499 ft)

Population (2023 Census of Pakistan)
  - Total: 52,476
- Time zone: UTC+5 (PST)
- Calling code: 046
- Number of Towns: 4
- Number of Union councils: 16

Pir Mahal (Punjabi: پیر محل) is a city and headquarters of Pir Mahal Tehsil of Toba Tek Singh District in the Punjab province of Pakistan.

In March 2024, media reported that the Punjab government had approved funds to construct five expressways to connect major districts of the province. The five included approval of Rs 66 billion for the 200 km Chichawatni to Pir Mahal- Shorkot to Garhmahraja- Chowk Azam to Layyah Expressway.
