= Sardar Muhammad Chaudhry =

Pakistani police officer (1937–2001)

Sardar Muhammad Chaudhry (1937–2001) was a Pakistani police officer and Inspector general.

He practised law briefly and then joined the Police Service of Pakistan in 1963. He served in the field but the major portion of his career was spent in the Intelligence, FIA and Narcotics Control Board. His last position, before retiring in March 1997, was as Inspector General of Police Punjab, the most populous province of Pakistan. Because of his rich experience and deep insight he emerged as a guide, a wise counsel of the police and government. He is held in high esteem by police force as well as the general public for his high integrity, fairness and his humane approach. He wrote many books after his retirement.

He is the author of following books in English and Urdu.

- The Ultimate Crime
- Jahan-e-Hairat
- Punjab Police Such kia Hai
- Quaid-e-Azam Biswein Sadi Ka Sub Say Bara Insaan
- Nawaz Sharif Teri Rahoon Ka Seeda Musafir
- Kisht-e-Wiran
- Mata-e-Faqeer
- Rawish Rawish Roshane
- The Trail Blazer
- Police Crime and Politics
