= PP-120 Toba Tek Singh-II =

Constituency of the Punjabi Provincial Legislature, Pakistan

- Constituency for the Provincial Assembly of Punjab
- Region: Gojra Tehsil (partly) including Gojra city of Toba Tek Singh District

Current constituency
- Created from: PP-85 Toba Tek Singh-II (2002-2018); PP-119 Toba Tek Singh-II (2018-2023)

PP-120 Toba Tek Singh-II (پی پی-120، ٹوبہ ٹیک سنگھ-2) is a constituency of the Provincial Assembly of Punjab in Pakistan.

== General elections 2024 ==
Provincial election 2024: PP-120 Toba Tek Singh-II
Party	Candidate	Votes	%	±%
Independent	Muhammad Ahsan Ihsan (Note: Filed nomination papers as PTI candidate but ECP allowed him to run as an Independent)	56,740	41.94	
Independent	Fozia Khalid Chaudhry	24,613	18.19	
PML(N)	Abdul Qadeer Alvi	24,518	18.12	
TLP	Faqir Muhammad	8,267	6.11	
Independent	Muhammad Rafique	8,110	6.00	
JI	Atta Ullah Hameed	4,471	3.31	
PPP	Haji Muhammad Ishaq	3,573	2.64	
Kissan Ittehad Awami Party	Omer Iftikhar	2,456	1.82	
Others	Others (sixteen candidates)	2,541	1.87	
Turnout		138,471	54.95	
Total valid votes		135,289	97.70	
Rejected ballots		3,182	2.30	
Majority		32,127	23.75	
Registered electors		252,015		
hold				

== General elections 2018 ==
Provincial election 2018: PP-119 Toba Tek Singh-II
Party	Candidate	Votes	%	±%
PML(N)	Abdul Qadeer Alvi	46,776	38.96	
PTI	Muhammad Khalid Bashir	33,210	27.66	
PNML	Muhammad Ahsan Ihsan	17,616	14.67	
TLP	Zulifqar Ali	7,287	6.07	
MMA	Atta Ullah Hameed	6,786	5.65	
PPP	Muhammad Ishaq	4,783	3.98	
Independent	Mehboob Subhani	1,895	1.58	
Others	Others (four candidates)	1,711	1.42	
Turnout		125,098	57.34	
Total valid votes		120,064	95.98	
Rejected ballots		5,034	4.02	
Majority		13,566	11.30	
Registered electors		218,186		

== General elections 2013 ==
Provincial election 2013: PP-85 Toba Tek Singh-II
Party	Candidate	Votes	%	±%
PML(N)	Abdul Qadeer Alvi	39,170	39.00	
Independent	Ihsan Ul Haq	21,757	21.66	
PNML	Mian Tariq Mehmood	14,958	14.89	
PTI	Muhammad Owais Nabeel	9,099	9.06	
PPP	Haji Muhammad Ishaq	6,175	6.15	
JI	Dr. Atta Ullah Hameed	2,906	2.89	
Independent	Pal Jozaf	1,088	1.08	
Independent	Muhammad Zahid Iqbal	1,056	1.05	
Independent	Ghulam Muhammad	1,031	1.03	
Others	Others (nine candidates)	3,195	3.18	
Turnout		103,665	61.28	
Total valid votes		100,435	96.88	
Rejected ballots		3,230	3.12	
Majority		17,413	17.34	
Registered electors		169,178		

== General elections 2008 ==
Contesting candidates	Party affiliation	Votes polled

== See also ==
- PP-119 Toba Tek Singh-I
- PP-121 Toba Tek Singh-III
