= Kamalia Tehsil =

Tehsil subdivision in Toba Tek Singh District, Punjab, Pakistan

Kamalia Tehsil تحصیل کمالیہ
- Tehsil
- Country: Pakistan
- Region: (Punjab, Pakistan) Punjab
- District: Toba Tek Singh
- Headquarters: Kamalia

Population (2023 Census of Pakistan)
  - Tehsil: 422,477
  - Urban: 166,617
  - Rural: 255,860
- Postal code: 36350
- Area code: 046

Kamalia (Punjabi, Urdu: تحصیل کمالیہ) (popular as City of Khaddar) is a tehsil in Toba Tek Singh District, Punjab, Pakistan. Kamalia is its capital city.
