= Toba Tek Singh Tehsil =

Tehsil subdivision in Toba Tek Singh District, Punjab, Pakistan

Toba Tek Singh Tehsil تحصیل ٹوبھا ٹیک سنگھ تحصیل ٹوبہ ٹیک سنگھ
- Tehsil
- Country: Pakistan
- Region: (Punjab, Pakistan) Punjab
- District: Toba Tek Singh
- Capital: Toba Tek Singh
- Towns: 1
- Union councils: 32

Population (2017)
  - Tehsil: 739,826
  - Urban: 87,210
  - Rural: 652,616
- Time zone: UTC+5 (PST)
  - Summer (DST): UTC+6 (PDT)

Toba Tek Singh (Punjabi: تحصیل ٹوبھا ٹیک سنگھ, Urdu: تحصیل ٹوبہ ٹیک سنگھ) is a tehsil (subdivision) of Toba Tek Singh District in the Punjab province of Pakistan. It is administratively subdivided into 32 Union Councils, three of which form the tehsil capital Toba Tek Singh.

== History ==
The original Toba Tek Singh Tehsil was formed in 1900, then part of Jhang District, with Toba Tek Singh as its capital. In 1930, it became a tehsil subdivision. In 1982, it became a district, the current Toba Tek Singh Tehsil is a subdivision of this district.
