= List of districts in Punjab, Pakistan =

Districts of Punjab, Pakistan

Districts of Punjab
- Districts of Punjab with their names as of 2023. Colors correspond to divisions
- Location: Punjab, Pakistan
- Number: 41 (as of 2024)
- Populations: 372,947 (Murree District) – 13,004,135 (Lahore District)
- Areas: 738 square kilometres (285 sq mi) (Murree District) – 24,830 square kilometres (9,590 sq mi) (Bahawalpur District)
- Government: District Government; City District Government; Zilla Council
- Subdivisions: Tehsils

The province of Punjab, the most populous province of Pakistan and the second-largest province by area, is divided into 41 districts and 10 divisions(as of January 2023). Below, you will find an overview of the recent history of districts in Punjab, a map showing each district, the divisions of Punjab and their districts, and a list showing each district's name, the division the district belongs to, the district's area, the location of the district's headquarters, the district's population and population density (in 2017), the average annual population growth rate of each district (between 1998 and 2017), and a map showing each district's location.

== History ==
=== Colonial Times ===
==== 1868–1901 ====
Districts and Divisions were both introduced in Punjab as administrative units by the British when Punjab became a part of British India, and ever since then, they have formed an integral part in the civil administration of the Punjab (this region today also covers parts of Khyber Pakhtunkhwa, the entire Islamabad Capital Territory, and parts of the Indian States of Chandigarh, Delhi, Haryana, Himachal Pradesh, and Punjab). At the time of Punjab's second census, which took place in 1868, the Punjab was divided into 32 districts, under 10 divisions. The administrative setup of the region was as follows:

| Division | District | Current status |
|---|---|---|
| Ambalah Division | Ambalah District | Given to India during the Partition of India |
| Ambalah Division | Ludhiana District | Given to India during the Partition of India |
| Ambalah Division | Simla District | Given to India during the Partition of India |
| Amritsar Division (Note: This division was given to India, but not all of its districts) | Amritsar District | Given to India during the Partition of India |
| Amritsar Division | Gurdaspur District | Given to India during the Partition of India |
| Amritsar Division | Sialkot District | Exists in present day Pakistani Punjab |
| Delhi Division | Delhi District | Given to India during the Partition of India |
| Delhi Division | Gurgaon District | Given to India during the Partition of India |
| Delhi Division | Karnal District | Given to India during the Partition of India |
| Derajat Division | Bannu District | Exists in present day Pakistani Punjab |
| Derajat Division | Dera Ghazi Khan District | Exists in present day Pakistani Punjab |
| Derajat Division | Dera Ismail Khan District | Exists in present day Pakistani Punjab |
| Hissar Division | Hissar District | Given to India during the Partition of India |
| Hissar Division | Rohtak District | Given to India during the Partition of India |
| Hissar Division | Sirsah District | Given to India during the Partition of India |
| Jalandhar Division | Hoshiarpur District | Given to India during the Partition of India |
| Jalandhar Division | Jalandhar District | Given to India during the Partition of India |
| Jalandhar Division | Kangra District | Given to India during the Partition of India |
| Lahore Division (Note: This division was not given to India, but some of its districts were) | Firozpur District | Given to India during the Partition of India |
| Lahore Division | Gujranwala District | Exists in present day Pakistani Punjab |
| Lahore Division | Lahore District | Exists in present day Pakistani Punjab |
| Multan Division | Jhang District | Exists in present day Pakistani Punjab |
| Multan Division | Montgomery District (Note: Has been renamed) | Exists in present day Pakistani Punjab |
| Multan Division | Multan District | Exists in present day Pakistani Punjab |
| Multan Division | Muzaffargarh District | Exists in present day Pakistani Punjab |
| Peshawar Division | Hazara District | Now in Pakistan's Khyber Pakhtunkhwa province |
| Peshawar Division | Kohat District | Now in Pakistan's Khyber Pakhtunkhwa province |
| Peshawar Division | Peshawar District | Now in Pakistan's Khyber Pakhtunkhwa province |
| Rawalpindi Division | Gujrat District | Exists in present day Pakistani Punjab |
| Rawalpindi Division | Jhelum District | Exists in present day Pakistani Punjab |
| Rawalpindi Division | Rawalpindi District | Exists in present day Pakistani Punjab |
| Rawalpindi Division | Shahpur District | Located in present day Pakistani Punjab but no longer exists |

The exact same setup was in use at the time of the 1881 and 1891 Census of Punjab as well.

By the 1901 census, the 10 revenue divisions that had been in place since 1868 had also been reorganized into only 5 larger divisions: Delhi, Jalandhar, Lahore, Multan, and Rawalpindi, and Sirsah District had been absorbed into Hissar District.

==== 1901–1911 ====
Between 1901 and 1911, many changes occurred to Punjab's administrative map. On 25 October 1901, after the 1901 census was taken, the Punjab province was divided into two separate entities: Punjab and the North-West Frontier Province. The North-West Frontier Province consisted of the three districts of Hazara, Kohat, and Peshawar, the Bannu and Marwat Tehsils of Bannu District (which then became Bannu District), and the Dera Ismail Khan, Kulachi, and Tank Tehsils of Dera Ismail Khan District (which then became Dera Ismail Khan District). The tehsils of Dera Ismail Khan and Bannu Districts which were not placed into the North-West Frontier Province became Mianwali District, placed in Multan. In 1904, Attock District was created out of parts of Rawalpindi District and Jhelum District, and Lyallpur District was created out of parts of Gujranwala, Jhang, and Montgomery Districts. In 1909, Mianwali District transferred from Multan Division to Rawalpindi Division. This all meant that at the time of Punjab's 1911 Census, Punjab had 29 districts split among 5 divisions. The administrative setup of the region was as follows:

| Division | District | Current status |
|---|---|---|
| Delhi Division | Ambala District | Given to India during the Partition of India |
| Delhi Division | Delhi District | Given to India during the Partition of India |
| Delhi Division | Gurgaon District | Given to India during the Partition of India |
| Delhi Division | Hissar District | Given to India during the Partition of India |
| Delhi Division | Karnal District | Given to India during the Partition of India |
| Delhi Division | Rohtak District | Given to India during the Partition of India |
| Delhi Division | Simla District | Given to India during the Partition of India |
| Jalandhar Division | Ferozpur District | Given to India during the Partition of India |
| Jalandhar Division | Hoshiarpur District | Given to India during the Partition of India |
| Jalandhar Division | Jalandhar District | Given to India during the Partition of India |
| Jalandhar Division | Kangra District | Given to India during the Partition of India |
| Jalandhar Division | Ludhiana District | Given to India during the Partition of India |
| Lahore Division | Amritsar District | Given to India during the Partition of India |
| Lahore Division | Gujranwala District | Exists in present day Pakistani Punjab |
| Lahore Division | Gurdaspur District | Given to India during the Partition of India |
| Lahore Division | Lahore District | Exists in present day Pakistani Punjab |
| Lahore Division | Sialkot District | Exists in present day Pakistani Punjab |
| Multan Division | Dera Ghazi Khan District | Exists in present day Pakistani Punjab |
| Multan Division | Jhang District | Exists in present day Pakistani Punjab |
| Multan Division | Lyallpur District | Exists in present day Pakistani Punjab |
| Multan Division | Montgomery District | Exists in present day Pakistani Punjab |
| Multan Division | Multan District | Exists in present day Pakistani Punjab |
| Multan Division | Muzaffargarh District | Exists in present day Pakistani Punjab |
| Rawalpindi Division | Attock District | Exists in present day Pakistani Punjab |
| Rawalpindi Division | Gujrat District | Exists in present day Pakistani Punjab |
| Rawalpindi Division | Jhelum District | Exists in present day Pakistani Punjab |
| Rawalpindi Division | Mianwali District | Exists in present day Pakistani Punjab |
| Rawalpindi Division | Rawalpindi District | Exists in present day Pakistani Punjab |
| Rawalpindi Division | Shahpur District | Located in present day Pakistani Punjab but no longer exists |

==== 1911–1947 ====
In late 1911, the imperial capital of British India was moved from Calcutta (today Kolkata) to Delhi. The district was reorganized as its own province that year, decreasing the number of districts in Punjab to 28. After the creation of Delhi Province, Delhi Division went by the name "Ambala Division". In 1919, Sheikhupura District was created from parts of Gujranwala and Lahore Districts and placed in Lahore Division. This meant that the number of districts and divisions in the province was the same in 1921 as it was in 1911, except Ambala Division was one district smaller and Lahore Division was one district larger, although Lahore Division hadn't changed much in area and population. The administrative setup of Punjab was as follows:

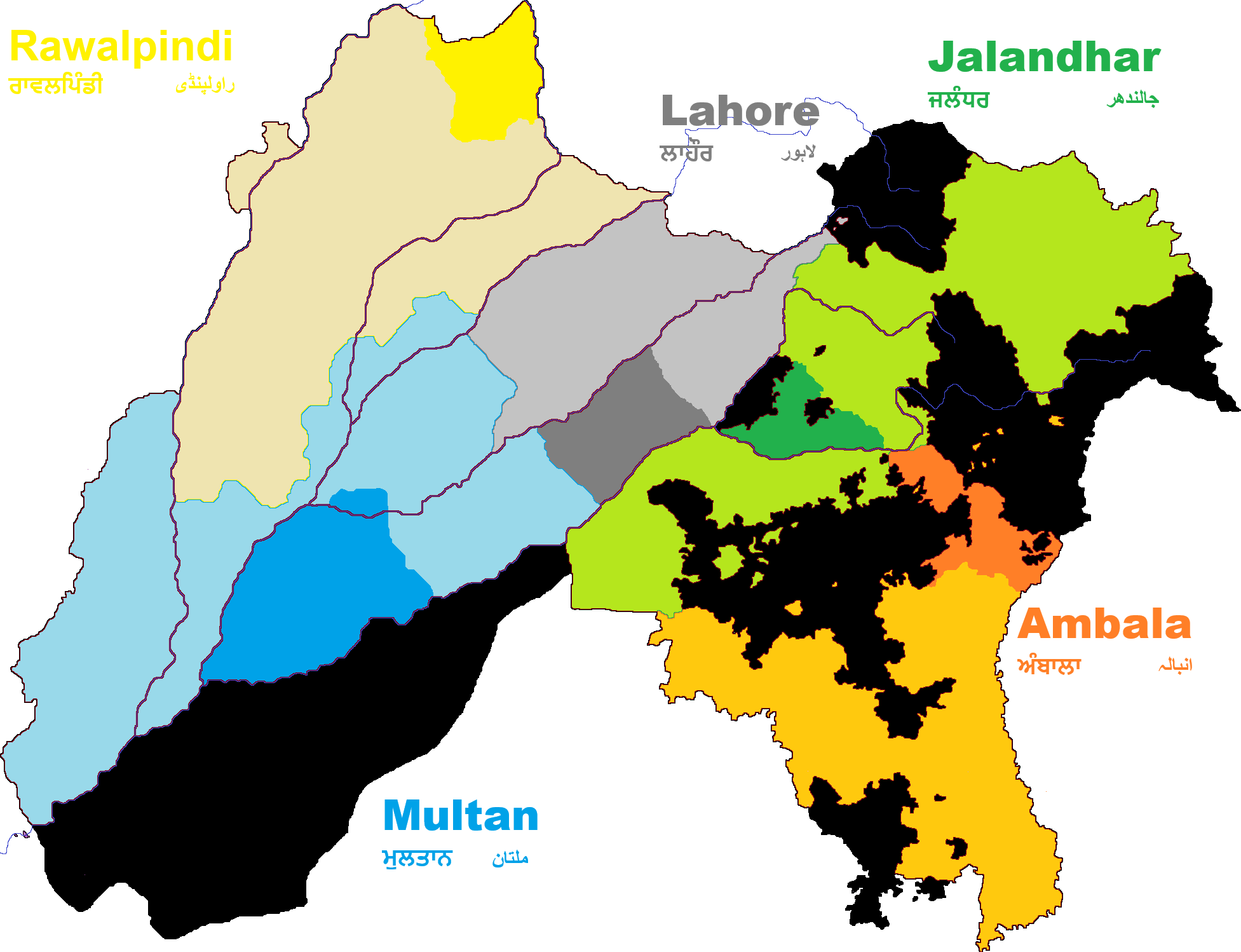
This map shows the British Divisions of Punjab in 1947: yellow is Rawalpindi, blue is Multan, gray is Lahore, green is Jalandhar, and orange is Ambala.

| Division | District | Current status |
|---|---|---|
| Ambala Division | Ambala District | Given to India during the Partition of India |
| Ambala Division | Gurgaon District | Given to India during the Partition of India |
| Ambala Division | Hissar District | Given to India during the Partition of India |
| Ambala Division | Karnal District | Given to India during the Partition of India |
| Ambala Division | Rohtak District | Given to India during the Partition of India |
| Ambala Division | Simla District | Given to India during the Partition of India |
| Jalandhar Division | Ferozpur District | Given to India during the Partition of India |
| Jalandhar Division | Hoshiarpur District | Given to India during the Partition of India |
| Jalandhar Division | Jalandhar District | Given to India during the Partition of India |
| Jalandhar Division | Kangra District | Given to India during the Partition of India |
| Jalandhar Division | Ludhiana District | Given to India during the Partition of India |
| Lahore Division | Amritsar District | Given to India during the Partition of India |
| Lahore Division | Gujranwala District | Exists in present day Pakistani Punjab |
| Lahore Division | Gurdaspur District | Given to India during the Partition of India |
| Lahore Division | Lahore District | Exists in present day Pakistani Punjab |
| Lahore Division | Sheikhupura District | Exists in present day Pakistani Punjab |
| Lahore Division | Sialkot District | Exists in present day Pakistani Punjab |
| Multan Division | Dera Ghazi Khan District | Exists in present day Pakistani Punjab |
| Multan Division | Jhang District | Exists in present day Pakistani Punjab |
| Multan Division | Lyallpur District | Exists in present day Pakistani Punjab |
| Multan Division | Montgomery District | Exists in present day Pakistani Punjab |
| Multan Division | Multan District | Exists in present day Pakistani Punjab |
| Multan Division | Muzaffargarh District | Exists in present day Pakistani Punjab |
| Rawalpindi Division | Attock District | Exists in present day Pakistani Punjab |
| Rawalpindi Division | Gujrat District | Exists in present day Pakistani Punjab |
| Rawalpindi Division | Jhelum District | Exists in present day Pakistani Punjab |
| Rawalpindi Division | Mianwali District | Exists in present day Pakistani Punjab |
| Rawalpindi Division | Rawalpindi District | Exists in present day Pakistani Punjab |
| Rawalpindi Division | Shahpur District | Located in present day Pakistani Punjab but no longer exists |

This exact setup existed in Punjab through the 1931 census, 1941 census, and all the way up to the partition of India and the independence of India and Pakistan.

=== Post-Independence ===
==== 1947–1954 ====
At the time of the Partition of India, Punjab was split religiously. As of the 1941 census, Punjab had a population that was 53.22% Muslim (mostly concentrated in the Western regions of the province), 29.11% Hindu (mostly concentrated in the Eastern regions of the province), and 14.91% Sikh (mostly concentrated in the center of the province, around Amritsar and Lahore). Because of this divide, Punjab was split into East Punjab, which would have a Hindu/Sikh majority and would be placed in India, and West Punjab, which would have a Muslim majority and would be placed in Pakistan. The line dividing the two was placed by Cyrial Radcliffe, and the line he drew would come to be known as the Radcliffe line.

In the partition, Multan Division and Rawalpindi Division, which were 75.43% and 85.52% Muslim respectively, were entirely given to Pakistan. Each district and each tehsil in both of these divisions had a proportion of Muslims over 50%.

Ambala Division was given to India, being only 28.07% Muslim. Every district in Ambala Division had a non-Muslim majority, and all tehsils but two had non-Muslim majorities (Ferozpur Jhirka and Nuh Tehsils in Gurgaon District had Muslim proportions of 78.79% and 57.88% respectively, but they were very far from all the other Muslim majority districts and tehsils in the Punjab, being next to Delhi).

Jalandhar Division was entirely given to India as well, and each of its districts had a non-Muslim majority. Four Tehsils in this division, though, Ferozpur (55.25% Muslim) and Zira (65.26% Muslim) Tehsils in Ferozpur District, and Jalandhar (51.16% Muslim) and Nakodar (59.41% Muslim) Tehsils in Jalandhar District all had Muslim majorities and bordered Pakistan.

In Lahore Division, Gujranwala (70.45% Muslim), Sheikhupura (63.62% Muslim), and Sialkot (62.18% Muslim) Districts were all entirely given to Pakistan. In these three districts, each tehsil also had a Muslim majority. Amritsar District (46.52% Muslim) was entirely given to India, despite having one tehsil (Ajnala Tehsil at 59.46% Muslim) bordering other Muslim-majority tehsils and districts that was also Muslim-majority. Lahore District and Gurdaspur Districts, both Muslim majority (60.62% Muslim and 51.14% Muslim respectively) were the only two districts in Punjab that were split. In Gurdaspur District, which had four tehsils, three tehsils were majority Muslim (Batala, Gurdaspur, and Shakargarh Tehsils at 55.07%, 52.16%, and 51.32% Muslim respectively) and one tehsil was majority non-Muslim (Pathankot Tehsil at 38.89% Muslim). One tehsil in Gurdaspur District, Shakargarh Tehsil, was given to Pakistan and placed in Sialkot District, and the other three tehsils were all given to India despite forming a contiguous boundary. Lahore District had three tehsils, Chunian, Lahore and Qasur, all of which were Muslim majority (60.85%, 62.12%, and 57.19% Muslim respectively). While Chunian and Lahore Tehsils were entirely given to Pakistan, Qasur Tehsil was divided into two parts, which the larger part going to India. This was under the grounds of "protecting Amritsar city".

In the end, fifteen districts of Punjab went entirely to Pakistan, all of which were Muslim majority; twelve districts of Punjab went entirely to India, all of which were non-Muslim-majority, and the two districts of Gurdaspur and Lahore, both of which were Muslim majority, were split between India and Pakistan. At the tehsil level, though, eight Muslim-majority tehsils which were contiguous with Pakistan were given to India, while not a single non-Muslim-majority tehsil was given to Pakistan. This left sixteen districts in Pakistani Punjab, that were split up into three divisions. No changes to this setup had occurred up to the time of the 1951 census (except for Attock District being renamed Campbellpur District). The administrative setup of Pakistani Punjab in 1951 was as follows:

- Lahore Division
  - Gujranwala District
  - Lahore District
  - Sheikhupura District
  - Sialkot District
- Multan Division
  - Dera Ghazi Khan District
  - Jhang District
  - Lyallpur District
  - Montgomery District
  - Multan District
  - Muzaffargarh District
- Rawalpindi Division
  - Campbellpur District
  - Gujrat District
  - Jhelum District
  - Mianwali District
  - Rawalpindi District
  - Shahpur District (Note: No longer exists)

==== 1955–1972 ====
In 1955, the One Unit policy that consolidated all of West Pakistan into one province began. From 1955 - 1970, the province of West Punjab ceased to exist, never to return. The death of the province brought the rise of divisions as the primary form of organizing Pakistan's districts, instead of provinces. The area covering former West Punjab, though, kept the same districts and divisions through 1961 (and the 1961 census) as it did in 1951.

The One Unit policy ended in 1970 and provinces returned once again, but when West Punjab was reorganized, it was renamed Punjab and the area which earlier housed the Princely State of Bahawalpur (which, during One Unit, was made into a division and split into the three districts of Bahawalnagar, Bahawalpur, and Rahim Yar Khan) was absorbed into the province.

By the time of the 1972 Census of Pakistan, many changes had been made to the administrative map:

In 1960, Shahpur District was abolished, and Sargodha District took its place, covering the area once occupied by Shahpur District. The headquarters of this new district were placed at the city of Sargodha(that was shifted from Shahpur to Sargodha City in 1940);

In 1960, Punjab gained another division with the formation of Sargodha Division. Sargodha Division was composed of Mianwali and Sargodha Districts (both formerly in Rawalpindi Division) and Faisalabad and Jhang Districts (both formerly in Multan Division);

In 1966, Montgomery District was renamed Sahiwal District, at the same time of the city of Sahiwal's renaming;

This all meant that by the time of the 1972 Census, Punjab was divided into five divisions covering nineteen districts. The administrative setup of Punjab province in 1972 was as follows:

- Bahawalpur Division
  - Bahawalnagar District
  - Bahawalpur District
  - Rahim Yar Khan District
- Lahore Division
  - Gujranwala District
  - Lahore District
  - Sheikhupura District
  - Sialkot District
- Multan Division
  - Dera Ghazi Khan District
  - Multan District
  - Muzaffargarh District
  - Sahiwal District
- Rawalpindi Division
  - Campbellpur District
  - Gujrat District
  - Jhelum District
  - Rawalpindi District
- Sargodha Division
  - Jhang District
  - Lyallpur District
  - Mianwali District
  - Sargodha District

==== 1972–1981 ====
New administrative districts kept being carved up and renamed between 1972 and the year of the next census, 1981.

In 1976, the tehsils of Chunian and Qasur were separated from Lahore District to form Qasur District, which was placed in Lahore Division;

In the same year, the tehsils of Vehari and Malisi in Multan District, and a group of four "qanungo circles" in Sahiwal District's Pakpattan Tehsil were reorganized into their own district, called Vehari District. Vehari District was placed in Multan Division;

In 1977, Lyallpur District was renamed Faisalabad District, at the same time of the city of Faisalabad's renaming;

In 1978, Campbellpur District was renamed Attock District, at the same time of the city of Attock's renaming;

by the time of the 1981 Census, Punjab was divided into five divisions covering 21 districts. The administrative setup of Punjab province in 1981 was as follows:

- Bahawalpur Division
  - Bahawalnagar District
  - Bahawalpur District
  - Rahim Yar Khan District
- Lahore Division
  - Gujranwala District
  - Lahore District
  - Qasur District
  - Sheikhupura District
  - Sialkot District
- Multan Division
  - Dera Ghazi Khan District
  - Multan District
  - Muzaffargarh District
  - Sahiwal District
  - Vehari District
- Rawalpindi Division
  - Attock District
  - Gujrat District
  - Jhelum District
  - Rawalpindi District
- Sargodha Division
  - Jhang District
  - Faisalabad District
  - Mianwali District
  - Sargodha District

==== 1981–1998 ====
This administrative setup did not last long, and by the time of the 1998 Pakistan Census, over a dozen new districts and three new divisions had been created.

Sometime between the censuses of 1981 and 1998, the districts of Gujranwala, Gujrat, and Sialkot were removed from the divisions of Rawalpindi and Lahore and were organized into the newly created Gujranwala Division.

Sometime between the censuses of 1981 and 1998, the districts of Dera Ghazi Khan and Muzaffargarh were removed from Multan Division and were organized into the newly formed Dera Ghazi Khan Division.

Sometime between the censuses of 1981 and 1998, the districts of Faisalabad and Jhang were removed from Sargodha Division and were organized into the newly formed Faisalabad Division.

Sometime between the censuses of 1981 and 1998, Pakpattan District was created out of Sahiwal District's Pakpattan Tehsil. Pakpattan District was kept in Multan Division.

In 1982, Bhakkar District was formed out of Mianwali District's Bhakkar Tehsil. Bhakkar District was kept inside Sargodha Division.

In 1982, Khushab District was formed out of most of Sargodha District's Khushab Tehsil. Khushab District was kept inside Sargodha Division.

In 1982, Layyah District was formed out of Muzaffargarh District's Layyah Tehsil. Layyah District was a part of Dera Ghazi Khan Division.

In 1982, Okara District was formed out of the two tehsils of Depalpur and Okara inside Sahiwal District. Okara District was placed inside Lahore Division by the time of the 1998 census.

In 1982, Rajanpur District was carved out of Dera Ghazi Khan District's two tehsils of Jampur and Rajanpur, as well as some union councils in Dera Ghazi Khan's de-excluded area, which then became the Rajanpur de-excluded area. This district was a part of Dera Ghazi Khan Division.

In 1982, Toba Tek Singh District was formed out of Faisalabad District's Toba Tek Singh Tehsil and a few Union Councils in Jhang District. Toba Tek Singh District was inside Faisalabad Division by the time of the 1998 census.

In 1985, Chakwal District was formed out of most of Attock District's Talagang Tehsil, Jhelum District's Chakwal Tehsil, and a few more union councils inside Jhelum District. Chakwal District was kept in Rawalpindi Division.

In 1985, Khanewal District was created out of two tehsils in Multan District: Kabirwala and Khanewal. Khanewal District was kept inside Multan Division.

In 1991, Lodhran District was formed out of Multan District's Lodhran Tehsil. Lodhran District was kept inside Multan Division.

In 1991, Narowal District was formed out of the two tehsils of Narowal and Shakargarh inside Sialkot District. Narowal District was inside Gujranwala Division by the time of the 1998 census.

In 1993, Hafizabad District was formed out of Gujranwala District's Hafizabad Tehsil. Hafizabad District was inside Gujranwala Division by the time of the 1998 census.

In 1993, Mandi Bahauddin District was formed out of Gujrat District's Phalia Tehsil. Mandi Bahauddin District was inside Gujranwala Division by the time of the 1998 census.

All this meant was that by the time of the 1998 Census of Pakistan, the province of Punjab was administratively divided into 34 districts inside eight divisions. The administrative setup of Punjab was as follows:

- Bahawalpur Division
  - Bahawalnagar District
  - Bahawalpur District
  - Rahim Yar Khan District
- Dera Ghazi Khan Division
  - Dera Ghazi Khan District
  - Layyah District
  - Muzaffargarh District
  - Rajanpur District
- Faisalabad Division
  - Faisalabad District
  - Jhang District
  - Toba Tek Singh District
- Gujranwala Division
  - Gujranwala District
  - Gujrat District
  - Hafizabad District
  - Mandi Bahauddin District
  - Narowal District
  - Sialkot District
- Lahore Division
  - Lahore District
  - Okara District
  - Qasur District
  - Sheikhupura District
- Multan Division
  - Khanewal District
  - Lodhran District
  - Multan District
  - Pakpattan District
  - Sahiwal District
  - Vehari District
- Rawalpindi Division
  - Attock District
  - Chakwal District
  - Jhelum District
  - Rawalpindi District
- Sargodha Division
  - Bhakkar District
  - Khushab District
  - Mianwali District
  - Sargodha District

==== 1998–2017 ====
In August 2000, all divisions throughout Pakistan were abolished, but were in their exact previous forms eight years later after the elections of 2008, with one exception.

In 2005, Nankana Sahib District was formed out of Sheikhupura District's Nankana Sahib Tehsil and Safdarabad Tehsil.

In 2008, Safdarabad Tehsil was given back to Sheikhupura District.

In November 2008, Sahiwal Division was created, being formed out of Okara District, Pakpattan District and Sahiwal District in Lahore Division and Multan Division.

In 2009, Chiniot District was formed out of Jhang District's Chiniot Tehsil. Chiniot District was inside Faisalabad Division by the time of the 2017 census. This raised the total number of districts in Punjab to 36.

This meant that by the time of the 2017 Census of Pakistan, the Province of Punjab has 36 districts (two more than in 1998) organized into nine divisions.

- Bahawalpur Division
  - Bahawalnagar District
  - Bahawalpur District
  - Rahim Yar Khan District
- Dera Ghazi Khan Division
  - Dera Ghazi Khan District
  - Layyah District
  - Muzaffargarh District
  - Rajanpur District
- Faisalabad Division
  - Chiniot District
  - Faisalabad District
  - Jhang District
  - Toba Tek Singh District
- Gujranwala Division
  - Gujranwala District
  - Gujrat District
  - Hafizabad District
  - Mandi Bahauddin District
  - Narowal District
  - Sialkot District
- Lahore Division
  - Lahore District
  - Nankana Sahib District
  - Kasur District
  - Sheikhupura District
- Multan Division
  - Khanewal District
  - Lodhran District
  - Multan District
  - Vehari District
- Rawalpindi Division
  - Attock District
  - Chakwal District
  - Jhelum District
  - Rawalpindi District
- Sahiwal Division
  - Okara District
  - Pakpattan District
  - Sahiwal District
- Sargodha Division
  - Bhakkar District
  - Khushab District
  - Mianwali District
  - Sargodha District

==== 2017 – present ====
In August 2022, Gujrat Division was created, being formed out of Gujrat District, Hafizabad District and Mandi Bahauddin District in Gujranwala Division.

On 15 October 2022, 5 new districts were created in Punjab. Murree District is created from Rawalpindi District, Talagang District is created from Chakwal District, Wazirabad District is created from Gujranwala District and added in Gujrat Division, Kot Addu District is created from Muzaffargarh District and Taunsa District is created from Dera Ghazi Khan District.

On 14 January 2023, the Government of Punjab created Mianwali Division. However, the Election Commission of Pakistan barred the Government of Punjab from issuing the notification of granting the Division Status to Mianwali, as it was conducting delimitation for by-polls in the province, the line of demarcation could not be drawn at the time.

This meant that by the time of the 2023 Census of Pakistan, the Province of Punjab has 41 districts which is organized into 10 divisions.

- Bahawalpur Division
  - Bahawalnagar District
  - Bahawalpur District
  - Rahim Yar Khan District
- Dera Ghazi Khan Division
  - Dera Ghazi Khan District
  - Kot Addu District
  - Layyah District
  - Muzaffargarh District
  - Rajanpur District
  - Taunsa District
- Faisalabad Division
  - Chiniot District
  - Faisalabad District
  - Jhang District
  - Toba Tek Singh District
- Gujranwala Division
  - Gujranwala District
  - Narowal District
  - Sialkot District
- Gujrat Division
  - Gujrat District
  - Hafizabad District
  - Mandi Bahauddin District
  - Wazirabad District
- Lahore Division
  - Lahore District
  - Nankana Sahib District
  - Kasur District
  - Sheikhupura District
- Multan Division
  - Khanewal District
  - Lodhran District
  - Multan District
  - Vehari District
- Rawalpindi Division
  - Attock District
  - Chakwal District
  - Jhelum District
  - Murree District
  - Rawalpindi District
  - Talagang District
- Sahiwal Division
  - Okara District
  - Pakpattan District
  - Sahiwal District
- Sargodha Division
  - Bhakkar District
  - Khushab District
  - Mianwali District
  - Sargodha District

== List of the Districts by area, population, density, literacy rate etc. ==
Below you will find a list of all 41 districts in the province of Punjab, along with the division it belongs to, the area of the district, the population and population density of the district, the average annual population growth rate of each district (between 1998 and 2017), and a map showing its location. The districts are initially listed in alphabetical order, but they can be sorted in different ways by clicking the headers of the table.

List of the Districts by area, population, density, literacy rate etc.
| District | Headquarter | Area (km^{2}) | Population (2023) | Density (ppp/km^{2}) | Literacy rate (2023) | Average Annual Population Growth Rate (1998 - 2017) | Map | Division |
|---|---|---|---|---|---|---|---|---|
| Attock | Attock | 6,858 | 2,170,423 | 316.7 | 80.22% | 2.08% ▲ | | Rawalpindi |
| Bahawalnagar | Bahawalnagar | 8,878 | 3,550,342 | 399.6 | 67.01% | 1.95% ▲ | | Bahawalpur |
| Bahawalpur | Bahawalpur | 24,830 | 4,284,964 | 172.3 | 63.35% | 2.18% ▲ | | Bahawalpur |
| Bhakkar | Bhakkar | 8,153 | 1,957,470 | 240.5 | 65.68% | 2.39% ▲ | | Sargodha |
| Chakwal | Chakwal | 6,524 | 1,734,854 | 266.2 | 87.79% | 1.71% ▲ | | Rawalpindi |
| Chiniot | Chiniot | 2,643 | 1,563,024 | 591.3 | 65.05% | 1.85% ▲ | | Faisalabad |
| Dera Ghazi Khan | Dera Ghazi Khan | 11,922 | 3,393,705 | 285.8 | 56.78% | 2.98% ▲ | | Dera Ghazi Khan |
| Faisalabad | Faisalabad | 5,856 | 9,075,819 | 1,551.7 | 83.41% | 1.98% ▲ | | Faisalabad |
| Gujranwala | Gujranwala | 2,426 | 4,966,338 | 2,045.4 | 86.77% | 2.06% ▲ | | Gujranwala |
| Gujrat | Gujrat | 3,192 | 3,219,375 | 1,007.0 | 91.37% | 1.57% ▲ | | Gujrat |
| Hafizabad | Hafizabad | 2,367 | 1,319,909 | 557.0 | 75.77% | 1.74% ▲ | | Gujrat |
| Jhang | Jhang | 6,166 | 3,065,639 | 497.6 | 69.45% | 2.03% ▲ | | Faisalabad |
| Jhelum | Jhelum | 3,587 | 1,382,308 | 385.7 | 90.65% | 1.41% ▲ | | Rawalpindi |
| Kasur | Kasur | 3,995 | 4,084,286 | 1,021.4 | 72.85% | 2.03% ▲ | | Lahore |
| Khanewal | Khanewal | 4,349 | 3,364,077 | 774.3 | 70.97% | 1.83% ▲ | | Multan |
| Khushab | Jauharabad | 6,511 | 1,501,089 | 230.8 | 72.52% | 1.84% ▲ | | Sargodha |
| Lahore | Lahore | 1,772 | 13,004,135 | 7,336.6 | 89.62% | 3.00% ▲ | | Lahore |
| Layyah | Layyah | 6,289 | 2,102,386 | 334.5 | 71.83% | 2.59% ▲ | | Dera Ghazi Khan |
| Lodhran | Lodhran | 2,778 | 1,928,299 | 693.5 | 61.68% | 1.97% ▲ | | Multan |
| Mandi Bahauddin | Mandi Bahauddin | 2,673 | 1,829,486 | 683.1 | 80.27% | 1.68% ▲ | | Gujrat |
| Mianwali | Mianwali | 5,840 | 1,798,268 | 307.4 | 72.87% | 2.01% ▲ | | Sargodha |
| Multan | Multan | 3,720 | 5,362,305 | 1,441.1 | 71.41% | 2.23% ▲ | | Multan |
| Muzaffargarh | Muzaffargarh | 4,778 | 3,528,567 | 738.50 | 43.74% | ... | | Dera Ghazi Khan |
| Nankana Sahib | Nankana Sahib | 2,216 | 1,634,871 | 737.0 | 73.12% | 1.37% ▲ | | Lahore |
| Narowal | Narowal | 2,337 | 1,950,954 | 834.3 | 85.28% | 1.59% ▲ | | Gujranwala |
| Okara | Okara | 4,377 | 3,515,490 | 802.2 | 70.25% | 1.64% ▲ | | Sahiwal |
| Pakpattan | Pakpattan | 2,724 | 2,136,170 | 785.3 | 67.13% | 1.85% ▲ | | Sahiwal |
| Rahim Yar Khan | Rahim Yar Khan | 11,880 | 5,564,703 | 468.2 | 57.94% | 2.26% ▲ | | Bahawalpur |
| Rajanpur | Rajanpur | 12,319 | 2,381,049 | 193.3 | 46.09% | 3.16% ▲ | | Dera Ghazi Khan |
| Rawalpindi | Rawalpindi | 4,547 | 5,745,964 | 1,868.79 | 93.22% | 2.52% ▲ | | Rawalpindi |
| Sahiwal | Sahiwal | 3,201 | 2,881,811 | 900.6 | 74.77% | 1.64% ▲ | | Sahiwal |
| Sargodha | Sargodha | 5,854 | 4,334,448 | 740.1 | 76.73% | 1.73% ▲ | | Sargodha |
| Sheikhupura | Sheikhupura | 3,744 | 4,049,418 | 1,080.3 | 78.88% | 2.22% ▲ | | Lahore |
| Sialkot | Sialkot | 3,016 | 4,499,394 | 1,492.5 | 88.37% | 1.90% ▲ | | Gujranwala |
| Toba Tek Singh | Toba Tek Singh | 3,252 | 2,524,044 | 776.2 | 81.38% | 1.59% ▲ | | Faisalabad |
| Vehari | Vehari | 4,364 | 3,430,421 | 787.7 | 69.10% | 1.74% ▲ | | Multan |
| Talagang | Talagang | 2,932 | 602,246 | 226.33 | 75.50 | 1.90% ▲ | | Rawalpindi |
| Murree | Murree | 738 | 372,947 | 480 | 84.79 | ... | | Rawalpindi |
| Taunsa | Taunsa | 8,108 | ... | ... | 57.96 | ... | | Dera Ghazi Khan |
| Kot Addu | Kot Addu | 3,471 | 1,486,758 | 428.34 | 58.19 | ... | | Dera Ghazi Khan |
| Wazirabad | Wazirabad | 1,206 | 993,412 | 690 | 77.39 | ... | | Gujrat |

== List of this districts by population over the years ==
List of districts by population over the years
| District | Population (2023) | Population (2017) | Population (1998) | Population (1981) | Population (1972) | Population (1961) | Population (1951) |
|---|---|---|---|---|---|---|---|
| Attock | 2,170,423 | 1,886,378 | 1,274,935 | 876,667 | 748,890 | 532,845 | 486,043 |
| Bahawalnagar | 3,550,342 | 2,975,656 | 2,061,447 | 1,373,747 | 1,073,891 | 822,827 | 630,430 |
| Bahawalpur | 4,284,964 | 3,669,176 | 2,433,091 | 1,453,438 | 1,071,026 | 735,524 | 527,837 |
| Bhakkar | 1,957,470 | 1,647,852 | 1,051,456 | 665,884 | 500,498 | 332,882 | 233,733 |
| Chakwal | 1,734,854 | 1,495,463 | ... | ... | ... | ... | ... |
| Chiniot | 1,563,024 | 1,368,659 | 965,124 | 694,080 | 570,775 | 396,948 | 329,615 |
| Dera Ghazi Khan | 3,393,705 | 2,872,631 | 1,643,118 | 943,663 | 686,057 | 472,600 | 380,393 |
| Faisalabad | 9,075,819 | 7,882,444 | 5,429,547 | 3,561,909 | 3,163,756 | 1,990,297 | 1,548,689 |
| Gujranwala | 4,966,338 | 4,180,670 | 2,112,474 | 1,223,379 | 874,948 | 490,678 | 360,982 |
| Gujrat | 3,219,375 | 2,756,289 | 2,048,008 | 1,408,585 | 1,177,345 | 835,045 | 742,892 |
| Hafizabad | 1,319,909 | 1,156,954 | 832,980 | 567,572 | 444,187 | 291,778 | 251,557 |
| Jhang | 3,065,639 | 2,742,633 | 1,869,421 | 1,276,864 | 983,818 | 668,540 | 534,046 |
| Jhelum | 1,382,308 | 1,222,403 | ... | ... | ... | ... | ... |
| Kasur | 4,084,286 | 3,454,881 | 2,375,875 | 1,528,002 | 1,186,386 | 853,877 | 760,304 |
| Khanewal | 3,364,077 | 2,920,233 | 2,068,490 | 1,369,766 | 1,067,993 | 774,701 | 635,482 |
| Khushab | 1,501,089 | 1,280,372 | 905,711 | 641,366 | 543,314 | 360,395 | 268,118 |
| Lahore | 13,004,135 | 11,119,985 | 6,318,745 | 3,544,942 | 2,587,621 | 1,625,810 | 1,134,757 |
| Layyah | 2,102,386 | 1,823,995 | 1,120,951 | 666,517 | 495,537 | 273,224 | 162,202 |
| Lodhran | 1,928,299 | 1,699,693 | 1,171,800 | 739,912 | 558,793 | 363,563 | 289,052 |
| Mandi Bahauddin | 1,829,486 | 1,594,039 | 1,160,552 | 846,114 | 721,833 | 490,967 | 414,850 |
| Mianwali | 1,798,268 | 1,542,601 | 1,056,620 | 711,529 | 595,134 | 413,851 | 315,816 |
| Multan | 5,362,305 | 4,746,166 | 3,116,851 | 1,970,075 | 1,506,223 | 983,815 | 725,131 |
| Muzaffargarh | 3,528,567 | 2,981,048 | 1,827,465 | 1,048,243 | 756,221 | 532,015 | 446,038 |
| Nankana Sahib | 1,634,871 | 1,354,986 | 1,044,865 | ... | ... | ... | ... |
| Narowal | 1,950,954 | 1,707,575 | 1,265,097 | 908,977 | 834,501 | 550,425 | 512,475 |
| Okara | 3,515,490 | 3,040,826 | 2,232,992 | 1,487,261 | 1,123,812 | 827,528 | 730,472 |
| Pakpattan | 2,136,170 | 1,824,228 | 1,286,680 | 843,623 | 615,742 | 440,091 | 380,678 |
| Rahim Yar Khan | 5,564,703 | 4,807,762 | 3,141,053 | 1,841,451 | 1,398,879 | 1,015,715 | 664,234 |
| Rajanpur | 2,381,049 | 1,996,039 | 1,103,618 | 638,921 | 456,391 | 304,020 | 247,136 |
| Rawalpindi | 5,745,964 | 5,402,380 | 3,363,911 | ... | ... | ... | ... |
| Sahiwal | 2,881,811 | 2,513,011 | 1,843,194 | 1,281,526 | 944,656 | 743,614 | 603,782 |
| Sargodha | 4,334,448 | 3,696,212 | 2,665,979 | 1,911,849 | 1,557,641 | 1,107,226 | 893,269 |
| Sheikhupura | 4,049,418 | 3,460,004 | 2,276,164 | ... | ... | ... | ... |
| Sialkot | 4,499,394 | 3,894,938 | 2,723,481 | 1,802,505 | 1,509,424 | 1,045,958 | 961,721 |
| Toba Tek Singh | 2,524,044 | 2,191,495 | 1,621,593 | 1,134,572 | 1,084,442 | 706,800 | 615,582 |
| Vehari | 3,430,421 | 2,902,081 | 2,090,416 | 1,328,808 | 1,027,319 | 703,197 | 558,536 |
| Talagang | 602,246 | 527,756 | 401,607 | ... | ... | ... | ... |
| Murree | 372,947 | 352,329 | ... | ... | ... | ... | ... |
| Taunsa | 1,045,460 | 677,785 | ... | ... | ... | ... | ... |
| Kot Addu | 1,486,758 | 1,347,501 | 808,438 | 449,493 | 313,137 | 184,639 | 143,009 |
| Wazirabad | 993,412 | 830,396 | 644,233 | 442,493 | 370,310 | 254,715 | 217,197 |

== Proposed districts of Punjab Province ==
Demands for new districts in Panjab
From time to time, several ministers and elected representatives, have proposed the following new districts

| Proposed District | Proposed Headquarters | Current District | Division |
|---|---|---|---|
| Pindigheb district | Pindigheb | Attock District | Rawalpindi Division |
| Fateh Jhang district | Fateh Jang | Attock District | Rawalpindi Division |
| Gujar Khan district | Gujar Khan | Rawalpindi District | Rawalpindi Division |
| Kahuta district | Kahuta | Rawalpindi District | Rawalpindi Division |
| Pind Dadan Khan district | Pind Dadan Khan | Jhelum District and Chakwal District | Rawalpindi Division |
| Kharian district | Kharian | Gujrat District | Gujrat Division |
| Isakhel district | Isakhel | Mianwali District | Sargodha Division |
| Bhalwal district | Bhalwal | Sargodha District | Sargodha Division |
| Shahpur district | Shahpur | Sargodha District | Sargodha Division |
| Pasrur district | Pasrur | Sialkot District | Gujranwala Division |
| Daska district | Daska | Sialkot District | Gujranwala Division |
| Shankargarh district | Shankargarh | Narowal District | Gujranwala Division |
| Ferozewala district | Ferozewala | Sheikhupura District and Nankana Sahib District | Lahore Division |
| Chunian district | Chunian | Kasur District | Lahore Division |
| Dipalpur district | Dipalpur | Okara District | Sahiwal Division |
| Shorkot district | Shorkot | Jhang District | Faisalabad Division |
| Jaranwala district | Jaranwala | Faisalabad District | Faisalabad Division |
| Samundri district | Samundri | Faisalabad District | Faisalabad Division |
| Alipur district | Alipur | Muzaffargarh District | Dera Ghazi Khan Division |
| Jampur district | Jampur | Rajanpur District | Dera Ghazi Khan Division |
| Baluch tribal district | Lalgarh | Dera Ghazi Khan District and Rajanpur District | Dera Ghazi Khan Division |
| Shujabad district | Shujabad | Multan District | Multan Division |
| Kabirwala district | Kabirwala | Khanewal District | Multan Division |
| Mailsi district | Mailsi | Vehari District | Multan Division |
| Ahmedpur East district | Ahmedpur East | Bahawalpur District | Bahawalpur Division |
| Hasilpur district | Hasilpur | Bahawalpur District | Bahawalpur Division |
| Minchinabad district | Minchinabad | Bahawalnagar District | Bahawalpur Division |
| Chistian district | Chistian | Bahawalnagar District | Bahawalpur Division |
| Fort Abbas district | Fort Abbas | Bahawalnagar District | Bahawalpur Division |
| Liaqatpur district | Liaqatpur | Rahim Yar Khan District | Bahawalpur Division |
| Khanpur district | Khanpur | Rahim Yar Khan District | Bahawalpur Division |
| Sadiqabad district | Sadiqabad | Rahim Yar Khan District | Bahawalpur Division |

== See also ==
- List of Tehsils of Punjab, Pakistan
- Districts of Pakistan
  - Districts of Sindh
  - Districts of Khyber Pakhtunkhwa
  - Districts of Balochistan, Pakistan
  - Districts of Azad Kashmir
  - Districts of Gilgit-Baltistan
- Divisions of Punjab, Pakistan
- Divisions of Pakistan
