= Pirmahal Tehsil =

Tehsil subdivision in Toba Tek Singh District, Punjab, Pakistan

Pirmahal Tehsil تحصیل پیر محل
- Tehsil
- Location within Punjab, Pakistan Location within Pakistan
- Coordinates: 30°45′50″N 72°25′52″E
- Country: Pakistan
- Province: (Punjab, Pakistan) Punjab
- District: Toba Tek Singh
- Elevation: 148 m (486 ft)

Population (2017 Census of Pakistan)
  - Tehsil: 422,331
  - Urban: 44,219
  - Rural: 378,112
- Time zone: UTC+5 (PST)
- Calling code: 046
- Number of Towns: 4
- Number of Union councils: 16

Pirmahal (Punjabi, Urdu: تحصیل پیر محل) is a tehsil in Toba Tek Singh District, Punjab, Pakistan. Its capital is Pir Mahal city. On 24 January 2013, the Government of Punjab issued a notification upgrading Pir Mahal to Tehsil level, with effect from 1 February 2013. Pir Mahal Tehsil consists of four small towns and, according to the notification of the Government of Punjab, Pir Mahal Tehsil has 16 Union councils consisting of 133 Revenue Estates (small towns and villages).
