= Gojra Tehsil =

Gojra Tehsil تحصیل گوجرا تحصیل گوجرہ
- Tehsil
- Country: Pakistan
- Region: (Punjab, Pakistan) Punjab
- District: Toba Tek Singh
- Capital: Gojra
- Towns: 1
- Union councils: 24

Area
  - Tehsil: 1,115 km^{2} (431 sq mi)

Population (2017)
  - Tehsil: 656,007
  - Urban: 174,860
  - Rural: 481,147
- Time zone: UTC+5 (PST)
  - Summer (DST): UTC+6 (PDT)

Gojra (Punjabi: تحصیل گوجرا, Urdu: تحصیل گوجرہ) is a tehsil in Toba Tek Singh District, Punjab, Pakistan. The tehsil covers an area of 1,115 km^{2}, and is administratively subdivided into 24 Union Councils, six of which form the tehsil capital Gojra.
