= List of tehsils of Pakistan =

Fourth-level administrative divisions of Pakistan

Tehsils of Pakistan
- 2017 map of the provinces, territories, districts and tehsils of Pakistan.
- Category: Fourth-level administrative division
- Location: Pakistan
- Found in: Districts of Pakistan
- Government: Tehsil Municipal Administration
- Subdivisions: Union Council

This is a list of tehsils of Pakistan, the fourth level of government overall and the middle tier in the local government system. In some areas, the alternative word "taluka" is used but this is merely a historical formality. The list is organised by provinces and territories of Pakistan. Every district of Pakistan is administratively divided into several tehsils. Each tehsil is governed by a Tehsil Municipal Administration (TMA), which is focussed around a tehsil/taluka council. The head of each tehsil is a Tehsil/Taluka Nazim, assisted by a tehsil/taluka municipal officer (TMO) and a number of other officials, all of whom are answerable to the tehsil/taluka council. The Islamabad Capital Territory does not have any tehsils, but is instead divided into zones and sectors.

== Provinces ==
=== List of tehsils of Balochistan ===
Tehsil	Area (km^{2})	Population (2023)	Density (ppl/km^{2}) (2023)	Literacy rate (2023)	District	Division
Awaran Tehsil	13,075	45,774	3.50	42.90%	Awaran	Kalat
Gishkaur Tehsil	4,578	31,462	6.87	36.34%	Awaran	Kalat
Jhal Jhao Tehsil	6,381	28,132	4.41	26.62%	Awaran	Kalat
Korak Jhao Tehsil	3,058	27,652	9.04	26.71%	Awaran	Kalat
Mashkay Tehsil	2,418	45,938	19.00	41.21%	Awaran	Kalat
Gadani Tehsil	419	29,215	69.73	48.57%	Hub	Kalat
Sonmiani Tehsil	2,616	67,991	25.99	35.80%	Hub	Kalat
Hub Tehsil	868	233,443	268.94	44.35%	Hub	Kalat
Sakran Tehsil	...	...	...	...	Hub	Kalat
Dureji Tehsil	2,813	52,236	18.57	15.58%	Hub	Kalat
Kalat Tehsil	3,788	167,405	44.19	44.19%	Kalat	Kalat
Mangocher Tehsil	1,148	80,138	69.81	35.22%	Kalat	Kalat
Gazg Tehsil	1,390	8,286	5.96	18.75%	Kalat	Kalat
Johan Tehsil	1,328	15,731	11.85	27.49%	Kalat	Kalat
Khuzdar Tehsil	6,112	359,358	58.80	43.85%	Khuzdar	Kalat
Nal Tehsil	1,791	103,631	57.86	47.26%	Khuzdar	Kalat
Wadh Tehsil	2,118	116,229	54.88	31.83%	Khuzdar	Kalat
Zehri Tehsil	4,021	150,928	37.53	49.38%	Khuzdar	Kalat
Baghbana Tehsil	...	...	...	...	Khuzdar	Kalat
Aranji Tehsil	7,456	50,533	6.78	12.11%	Khuzdar	Kalat
Gresha Tehsil	2,622	69,665	26.57	22.10%	Khuzdar	Kalat
Karkh Tehsil	5,352	145806	26.62	32.14%	Khuzdar	Kalat
Moola Tehsil	3,283	32,689	9.96	52.68%	Khuzdar	Kalat
Ornach Tehsil	3,368	41,811	12.41	21.58%	Khuzdar	Kalat
Saroona Tehsil	3,257	36,380	11.17	24.22%	Khuzdar	Kalat
Uthal Tehsil	1,756	88,933	50.65	33.95%	Lasbela	Kalat
Lakhra Tehsil	1,954	46,744	23.92	15.31%	Lasbela	Kalat
Bela Tehsil	1,527	129,264	84.65	40.98%	Lasbela	Kalat
Kanraj Tehsil	1,190	15,996	13.44	20.32%	Lasbela	Kalat
Liari Tehsil	2,010	17,155	8.53	16.09%	Lasbela	Kalat
Dasht Tehsil	1,047	67,935	64.89	36.79%	Mastung	Kalat
Mastung Tehsil	692	162,319	234.57	53.70%	Mastung	Kalat
Khad Koocha Tehsil	640	46,316	72.37	33.22%	Mastung	Kalat
Kardigap Tehsil	929	36,701	39.51	42.71%	Mastung	Kalat
Dasht e Goran	215	27,503	127.92	38.85%	Surab	Kalat
Gidder	205	89,631	437.22	36.31%	Surab	Kalat
Shaheed meharabad zehri	109	66,435	609.50	42.85%	Surab	Kalat
Surab Tehsil	233	95,469	409.74	34.34%	Surab	Kalat
Dalbandin Tehsil	7,791	122,918	15.78	39.10%	Chagai	Rakhshan
Nok Kundi Tehsil	16,092	30,625	1.90	48.57%	Chagai	Rakhshan
Taftan Tehsil	9,318	19,259	2.07	19.70%	Chagai	Rakhshan
Chagai Tehsil	3,975	73,482	18.49	23.77%	Chagai	Rakhshan
Amuri tehsil	...	...	...	...	Chagai	Rakhshan
Chilgazi tehsil	...	...	...	...	Chagai	Rakhshan
Yakmach	7,572	22,908	3.03	24.36%	Chagai	Rakhshan
Kharan Tehsil	2,941	104,035	35.37	48.63%	Kharan	Rakhshan
Sar-Kharan Tehsil	3,539	86,015	24.30	36.70%	Kharan	Rakhshan
Tohumulk Tehsil	6,347	49,803	7.85	34.81%	Kharan	Rakhshan
Patkain Tehsil	2,131	20,499	9.62	35.06%	Kharan	Rakhshan
Nushki Tehsil	3,731	190,905	51.17	59.04%	Nushki	Rakhshan
Dak Tehsil	2,066	16,929	8.19	36.29%	Nushki	Rakhshan
Besima Tehsil	6,014	63,368	10.54	31.83%	Washuk	Rakhshan
Mashkel Tehsil	11,663	67,142	5.76	16.33%	Washuk	Rakhshan
Washuk Tehsil	7,494	55,585	7.42	18.10%	Washuk	Rakhshan
Nag Tehsil	4,338	57,467	13.25	18.02%	Washuk	Rakhshan
Shahgori Tehsil	3,584	59,061	16.48	23.55%	Washuk	Rakhshan
Barkhan Tehsil	3,514	210,249	59.83	33.62%	Barkhan	Loralai
Duki Tehsil	938	137,294	146.37	50.48%	Duki	Loralai
Luni Tehsil	553	13,615	24.62	33.80%	Duki	Loralai
Talao Tehsil	1,697	21,930	12.92	21.41%	Duki	Loralai
Thal Chutyali Tehsil	1,045	32,205	30.82	38.10%	Duki	Loralai
Bori Tehsil	2,203	225,642	102.42	46.82%	Loralai	Loralai
Mekhtar Tehsil	1,582	46,790	29.58	24.55%	Loralai	Loralai
Darug Tehsil	301	21,792	72.40	65.37%	Musakhel	Loralai
Kingri Tehseel	3,683	33,618	9.13	45.37%	Musakhel	Loralai
Musakhel Tehsil	658	49,809	75.70	34.51%	Musakhel	Loralai
Tiyar Essot Tehsil	299	10,568	35.34	24.71%	Musakhel	Loralai
Toisar Tehsil	539	56,818	105.41	26.06%	Musakhel	Loralai
Zimri Plaseen Tehsil	248	9,670	38.99	15.02%	Musakhel	Loralai
Chaman Tehsil	22	130,139	5,915.41	51.36%	Chaman	Sibi
Chaman Saddar Tehsil	1,319	336,079	254.80	35.18%	Chaman	Sibi
Harnai Tehsil	259	82,001	316.61	36.28%	Harnai	Sibi
Shahrig Tehsil	614	29,005	47.24	50.12%	Harnai	Sibi
Khost Tehsil	1,619	16,565	10.23	40.35%	Harnai	Sibi
Kahan Tehsil	3,754	107,840	28.73	19.87%	Kohlu	Sibi
Kohlu Tehsil	231	48,050	208.01	49.76%	Kohlu	Sibi
Maiwand Tehsil	2,915	51,635	17.71	25.75%	Kohlu	Sibi
Tamboo Tehsil	536	37,449	69.87	29.32%	Kohlu	Sibi
Shaheed Jahangir Abad	...	...	...	...	Kohlu	Sibi
Grisani Tehsil	174	15,246	87.62	34.40%	Kohlu	Sibi
Sibi Tehsil	1,949	154,970	79.51	52.40%	Sibi	Sibi
Kutmandai Tehsil	1,977	9,748	4.93	8.93%	Sibi	Sibi
Sangan Tehsil	1,378	5,431	3.94	22.67%	Sibi	Sibi
Lehri tehsil	1,817	53,999	29.72	40.79%	Sibi	Sibi
Ziarat Tehsil	1,489	78,912	53.00	54.20%	Ziarat	Sibi
Sinjawi Tehsil	1,812	110,623	61.05	35.88%	Ziarat	Sibi
Dera Bugti Tehsil	927	50,943	54.95	33.75%	Dera Bugti	Sibi
Phelawagh Tehsil	...	...	...	...	Dera Bugti	Sibi
Sui Tehsil	3,858	126,725	32.85	30.59%	Dera Bugti	Sibi
Baiker Tehsil	258	33,410	129.50	15.62%	Dera Bugti	Sibi
Gwadar Tehsil	2,590	147,673	57.02	51.60%	Gwadar	Makran
Jiwani Tehsil	454	35,004	77.10	35.28%	Gwadar	Makran
Ormara Tehsil	2,796	27,832	9.95	49.08%	Gwadar	Makran
Pasni Tehsil	4,822	74,128	15.37	59.71%	Gwadar	Makran
Suntsar Tehsil	1,975	20,523	10.39	31.69%	Gwadar	Makran
Mand Tehsil	1,456	56,772	38.99	54.19%	Kech	Makran
Tump Tehsil	1,945	147,041	75.60	47.17%	Kech	Makran
Turbat Tehsil	9,742	470,605	48.31	63.65%	Kech	Makran
Balnigor Tehsil	1,238	50,404	40.71	38.77%	Kech	Makran
Buleda Tehsil	1,997	107,847	54.00	35.36%	Kech	Makran
Dasht Tehsil	2,486	90,080	36.23	37.25%	Kech	Makran
Hoshab Tehsil	2,213	66,566	30.08	30.71%	Kech	Makran
Zamuran Tehsil	1,462	71,616	48.98	28.97%	Kech	Makran
Gayab Tehsil	...	...	...	...	Kech	Makran
Solband Tehsil	...	...	...	...	Kech	Makran
Gowargo Tehsil	1,471	31,718	21.56	27.57%	Panjgur	Makran
Panjgur Tehsil	2,945	392,277	133.20	46.19%	Panjgur	Makran
Paroom Tehsil	3,378	31,113	9.21	38.64%	Panjgur	Makran
Gichk Tehsil	8,387	33,578	4.00	20.15%	Panjgur	Makran
Kallag Tehsil	710	21,095	29.71	38.40%	Panjgur	Makran
Jaffarabad Tehsil	...	...	...	...	Jafarabad	Nasirabad
Jhatpat Tehsil	690	302,498	438.40	36.70%	Jafarabad	Nasirabad
Gandavah Tehsil	1,344	71,230	53.00	36.35%	Jhal Magsi	Nasirabad
Jhal Magsi Tehsil	1,679	116,528	69.40	26.82%	Jhal Magsi	Nasirabad
Mirpur Tehsil	592	15,610	26.37	24.86%	Jhal Magsi	Nasirabad
Faridabad Tehsil	137	68,948	503.27	41.09%	Sohbatpur	Nasirabad
Hayrvi Tehsil	73	16,891	231.38	42.60%	Sohbatpur	Nasirabad
Manjipur Tehsil	82	23,624	288.10	43.85%	Sohbatpur	Nasirabad
Saeed Muhammad Kanrani Tehsil	77	18,175	236.04	45.90%	Sohbatpur	Nasirabad
Panhwar Tehsil	99	47,624	481.05	35.38%	Sohbatpur	Nasirabad
Sohbatpur Tehsil	334	64,844	194.14	42.30%	Sohbatpur	Nasirabad
Baba Kot Tehsil	967	53,661	55.49	15.41%	Nasirabad	Nasirabad
Dera Murad Jamali	281	265,822	945.99	34.93%	Nasirabad	Nasirabad
Landhi Tehsil	266	8,638	32.47	17.60%	Nasirabad	Nasirabad
Chattar Tehsil	961	32,276	33.59	17.21%	Nasirabad	Nasirabad
Meer Hassan Tesil	229	53,400	233.19	22.99%	Nasirabad	Nasirabad
Tamboo Tehsil	683	149,518	218.91	28.80%	Nasirabad	Nasirabad
Usta Muhammad Tehsil	399	210,870	528.50	38.17%	Usta Muhammad	Nasirabad
Gandakha Tehsil	554	81,190	146.55	24.59%	Usta Muhammad	Nasirabad
Khattan	277	22,900	82.67	41.86%	Kachhi	Nasirabad
Dhadar Tehsil	976	49,836	51.06	45.10%	Kachhi	Nasirabad
Balanari Tehsil	402	60,158	149.65	32.21%	Kachhi	Nasirabad
Bhag Tehsil	1,308	83,687	63.98	35.24%	Kachhi	Nasirabad
Machh Tehsil	708	75,272	106.32	38.80%	Kachhi	Nasirabad
Sani Tehsil	2,011	150,821	75.00	15.58%	Kachhi	Nasirabad
Barshore Tehsil	2,288	141,994	62.06	47.61%	Pishin	Quetta
Hurramzai Tehsil	418	147,844	353.69	39.67%	Pishin	Quetta
Pishin Tehsil	1,199	325,641	271.59	52.50%	Pishin	Quetta
Saranan Tehsil	83	65,157	785.02	48.33%	Pishin	Quetta
Bostan Tehsil	186	49,721	267.32	45.19%	Pishin	Quetta
Chiltan Tehsil	...	...	...	...	Quetta	Quetta
Zarghoon Tehsil	...	...	...	...	Quetta	Quetta
Panjpai Tehsil	1,205	21,371	17.74	37.67%	Quetta	Quetta
Quetta Sadar Tehsil	1,283	330,421	257.54	56.66%	Quetta	Quetta
Kuchlak Tehsil	180	310,246	1,723.59	50.59%	Quetta	Quetta
Sariab Tehsil	221	572,854	2,592.10	42.99%	Quetta	Quetta
Gulistan Tehsil	1,536	126,474	82.34	36.12%	Qilla Abdullah	Quetta
Qilla Abdullah Tehsil	413	165,738	401.30	44.00%	Qilla Abdullah	Quetta
Dobandi Tehsil	1,604	69,759	43.49	18.10%	Qilla Abdullah	Quetta
Karezat Tehsil	1,240	59,756	48.19	74.18%	Karezat	Quetta
Khanozai Tehsil	...	...	...	...	Karezat	Quetta
Killa Saifullah Tehsil	1,103	152,516	138.27	30.77%	Qila Saifullah	Zhob
Loiband Tehsil	972	29,693	30.55	25.81%	Qila Saifullah	Zhob
Muslim Bagh Tehsil	943	83,795	88.86	45.36%	Qila Saifullah	Zhob
Badini Tehsil	985	20,640	20.95	19.15%	Qila Saifullah	Zhob
Kan Mehtarzai	383	34,298	89.55	53.65%	Qila Saifullah	Zhob
Shinki Tehsil	2,445	59,258	24.24	14.93%	Qila Saifullah	Zhob
Qamar Din Karez Tehsil	...	...	...	...	Zhob	Zhob
Zhob Tehsil	9,322	284,620	30.53	41.27%	Zhob	Zhob
Ashwat Tehsil	901	25,094	27.85	14.51%	Zhob	Zhob
Kashatu Tehsil	1,590	5,810	3.65	9.64%	Zhob	Zhob
Sambaza Tehsil	2,888	25,150	8.71	21.65%	Zhob	Zhob
Sherani Tehsil	4,310	191,687	44.47	23.86%	Sherani	Zhob

=== List of tehsils of Khyber Pakhtunkhwa ===
Tehsil	Area (km²)	Population (2023)	Density (ppl/km²) (2023)	Literacy rate (2023)	Districts	Division
Baka Khel Tehsil	367	192,797	107.84	28.25%	Bannu District	Bannu Division
Bannu Tehsil	228	644,909	106.97	49.46%	Bannu District	Bannu Division
Domel Tehsil	425	224,428	115.54	41.38%	Bannu District	Bannu Division
Kakki Tehsil	66	92,021	109.01	42.62%	Bannu District	Bannu Division
Miryan Tehsil	141	166,473	1,180.66	31.77%	Bannu District	Bannu Division
Wazir Tehsil	745	37,262	50.02	16.33%	Bannu District	Bannu Division
Bettani Tehsil	132	35,571	269.48	31.62%	Lakki Marwat District	Bannu Division
Ghazni Khel Tehsil	1,153	329,775	286.01	54.29%	Lakki Marwat District	Bannu Division
Lakki Marwat Tehsil	1,388	341,693	246.18	50.06%	Lakki Marwat District	Bannu Division
Sari Naurang Tehsil	623	333,817	535.82	42.66%	Lakki Marwat District	Bannu Division
Datta Khel Tehsil	1,807	92,196	100.53	30.63%	North Waziristan District	Bannu Division
Dossali Tehsil	250	50,524	100.29	33.02%	North Waziristan District	Bannu Division
Gharyum Tehsil	320	18,931	102.01	17.74%	North Waziristan District	Bannu Division
Ghulam Khan Tehsil	191	31,015	99.33	8.44%	North Waziristan District	Bannu Division
Mir Ali Tehsil	605	229,647	107.7	38.31%	North Waziristan District	Bannu Division
Miran Shah Tehsil	402	123,317	102.02	36.53%	North Waziristan District	Bannu Division
Razmak Tehsil	191	49,367	134.63	26.62%	North Waziristan District	Bannu Division
Shewa Tehsil	393	44,126	112.28	38.36%	North Waziristan District	Bannu Division
Spinwam Tehsil	548	54,209	99.82	23.47%	North Waziristan District	Bannu Division
Daraban Tehsil	1,540	149,447	97.04	26.89%	Dera Ismail Khan District	Dera Ismail Khan Division
Drazanda Tehsil	2,008	82,386	41.03	28.67%	Dera Ismail Khan District	Dera Ismail Khan Division
Dera Ismail Khan Tehsil	1,167	767,979	658.08	56.97%	Dera Ismail Khan District	Dera Ismail Khan Division
Kulachi Tehsil	1,229	102,595	83.48	30.29%	Dera Ismail Khan District	Dera Ismail Khan Division
Paharpur Tehsil	1,657	406,467	245.3	48.86%	Dera Ismail Khan District	Dera Ismail Khan Division
Paniala Tehsil	...	...	...	...	Dera Ismail Khan District	Dera Ismail Khan Division
Paroa Tehsil	1,733	320,937	185.19	35.56%	Dera Ismail Khan District	Dera Ismail Khan Division
Birmil Tehsil	923	112,757	122.16	23.06%	Lower South Waziristan District	Dera Ismail Khan Division
Shakai Tehsil	...	...	...	...	Lower South Waziristan District	Dera Ismail Khan Division
Toi Khulla Tehsil	567	102,835	181.37	7.81%	Lower South Waziristan District	Dera Ismail Khan Division
Wana Tehsil	2,315	184,645	79.76	31.29%	Lower South Waziristan District	Dera Ismail Khan Division
Ladha Tehsil	289	108,344	374.89	47.95%	Upper South Waziristan District	Dera Ismail Khan Division
Makin Tehsil	404	66,042	163.47	48.71%	Upper South Waziristan District	Dera Ismail Khan Division
Sararogha Tehsil	813	145,118	178.5	35.07%	Upper South Waziristan District	Dera Ismail Khan Division
Sarwakai Tehsil	398	58,804	147.75	37.67%	Upper South Waziristan District	Dera Ismail Khan Division
Shaktoi Tehsil	177	44,332	250.46	32.93%	Upper South Waziristan District	Dera Ismail Khan Division
Shawal Tehsil	...	...	...	...	Upper South Waziristan District	Dera Ismail Khan Division
Tiarza Tehsil	734	65,798	89.64	27.31%	Upper South Waziristan District	Dera Ismail Khan Division
Jandola Tehsil	1,221	44,794	36.69	33.63%	Tank District	Dera Ismail Khan Division
Tank Tehsil	1,679	425,499	253.42	41.43%	Tank District	Dera Ismail Khan Division
Abbottabad Tehsil	1,285	1,003,339	101.76	78.39%	Abbottabad District	Hazara Division
Havelian Tehsil	342	256,754	98.8	76.08%	Abbottabad District	Hazara Division
Lora Tehsil	187	98,717	97.22	73.73%	Abbottabad District	Hazara Division
Lower Tanawal Tehsil	153	60,262	98.88	71.66%	Abbottabad District	Hazara Division
Allai Tehsil	804	218,149	271.33	35.71%	Allai District	Hazara Division
Batagram Tehsil	497	335,984	676.02	41.20%	Batagram District	Hazara Division
Ghazi Tehsil	595	151,839	255.19	69.69%	Haripur District	Hazara Division
Haripur Tehsil	834	836,058	1,002.47	76.07%	Haripur District	Hazara Division
Khanpur Tehsil	296	186,886	631.37	73.76%	Haripur District	Hazara Division
Bataira / Kolai	170	142,660	839.18	15.93%	Kolai-Palas District	Hazara Division
Palas	1,240	137,502	110.89	23.08%	Kolai-Palas District	Hazara Division
Bankad Tehsil	331	205,851	621.91	20.14%	Lower Kohistan District	Hazara Division
Pattan Tehsil	311	134,166	431.4	24.61%	Lower Kohistan District	Hazara Division
Baffa Pakhal	640	460,090	718.89	60.85%	Mansehra District	Hazara Division
Bala Kot Tehsil	2,376	310,339	130.61	67.50%	Mansehra District	Hazara Division
Darband Tehsil	102	51,702	506.88	50.47%	Mansehra District	Hazara Division
Mansehra Tehsil	700	723,325	1,033.32	68.70%	Mansehra District	Hazara Division
Oghi Tehsil	307	251,721	819.94	52.85%	Mansehra District	Hazara Division
Tanawal Tehsil	...	...	...	...	Mansehra District	Hazara Division
Daur Maira Tehsil	86	50,503	587.24	25.92%	Torghar District	Hazara Division
Judba Tehsil	63	63,083	1,001.32	19.78%	Torghar District	Hazara Division
Khander Hassanzai Tehsil	305	86,859	284.78	38.66%	Torghar District	Hazara Division
Dassu Tehsil	1,958	148,914	76.05	15.11%	Upper Kohistan District	Hazara Division
Harban Basha Tehsil	...	...	...	25.49%	Upper Kohistan District	Hazara Division
Kandia Tehsil	1,926	165,232	85.79	13.71%	Upper Kohistan District	Hazara Division
Seo Tehsil	258	59,557	230.84	38.19%	Upper Kohistan District	Hazara Division
Doaba Tehsil	...	...	...	...	Hangu District	Kohat Division
Hangu Tehsil	669	280,883	419.86	48.63%	Hangu District	Kohat Division
Tall Tehsil	428	248,019	579.48	36.70%	Hangu District	Kohat Division
Banda Daud Shah Tehsil	...	...	...	53.95%	Karak District	Kohat Division
Karak Tehsil	1,299	339,983	261.73	67.76%	Karak District	Kohat Division
Takht-e-Nasrati Tehsil	607	298,151	491.19	69.55%	Karak District	Kohat Division
Dara Adam Khel Tehsil	446	139,839	313.54	58.90%	Kohat District	Kohat Division
Gumbat Tehsil	503	124,530	247.57	54.55%	Kohat District	Kohat Division
Kohat Tehsil	911	817,610	897.49	58.19%	Kohat District	Kohat Division
Lachi Tehsil	1,131	152,682	135	63.39%	Kohat District	Kohat Division
Central Kurram Tehsil	1,470	358,670	243.99	20.97%	Kurram District	Kohat Division
Lower Kurram Tehsil	940	150,945	160.58	38.15%	Kurram District	Kohat Division
Upper Kurram Tehsil	970	275,819	284.35	49.07%	Kurram District	Kohat Division
Central Orakzai Tehsil	399	92,819	232.63	34.79%	Orakzai District	Kohat Division
Ismail Zai Tehsil	275	39,328	143.01	34.20%	Orakzai District	Kohat Division
Lower Orakzai Tehsil	565	125,944	222.91	41.86%	Orakzai District	Kohat Division
Upper Orakzai Tehsil	299	129,470	433.01	23.98%	Orakzai District	Kohat Division
Bar Chamarkand Tehsil	13	3,574	104.41	23.81%	Bajaur District	Malakand Division
Barang Tehsil	159	90,082	100.27	23.39%	Bajaur District	Malakand Division
Khar Bajaur Tehsil	238	301,778	102.81	33.28%	Bajaur District	Malakand Division
Mamund Tehsil	250	358,190	103.29	24.48%	Bajaur District	Malakand Division
Nawagai Tehsil	216	93,850	103.2	27.39%	Bajaur District	Malakand Division
Salarzai Tehsil	220	316,767	101.01	19.90%	Bajaur District	Malakand Division
Utman Khel Tehsil	194	123,719	100.66	31.50%	Bajaur District	Malakand Division
Chagharzai Tehsil	218	125,949	577.75	38.27%	Buner District	Malakand Division
Daggar Tehsil	290	192,776	664.74	47.57%	Buner District	Malakand Division
Gadezai Tehsil	472	197,466	418.36	44.22%	Buner District	Malakand Division
Gagra Tehsil	217	179,087	825.29	46.22%	Buner District	Malakand Division
Khudu Khel Tehsil	343	136,560	398.13	45.10%	Buner District	Malakand Division
Mandanr Tehsil	325	185,031	569.33	39.47%	Buner District	Malakand Division
Chitral Tehsil	6,127	211,374	34.5	70.20%	Lower Chitral District	Malakand Division
Drosh Tehsil	331	109,033	329.4	57.38%	Lower Chitral District	Malakand Division
Adenzai Tehsil	372	378,915	1,018.59	62.19%	Lower Dir District	Malakand Division
Balambat Tehsil	...	...	...	...	Lower Dir District	Malakand Division
Khal Tehsil	...	...	...	...	Lower Dir District	Malakand Division
Lal Qilla Tehsil	216	247,381	1,145.28	53.29%	Lower Dir District	Malakand Division
Munda Tehsil	...	...	...	...	Lower Dir District	Malakand Division
Samar Bagh Tehsil	419	427,714	1,020.80	45.75%	Lower Dir District	Malakand Division
Timergara Tehsil	576	596,173	1,035.02	64.06%	Lower Dir District	Malakand Division
Sam Ranizai Tehsil	280	353,291	1,261.75	59.13%	Malakand District	Malakand Division
Swat Ranizai Tehsil	672	472,959	703.81	63.57%	Malakand District	Malakand Division
Thana Baizai Tehsil	...	...	...	...	Malakand District	Malakand Division
Utman Khel Tehsil	...	...	...	31.50%	Malakand District	Malakand Division
Alpuri Tehsil	582	366,772	630.19	38.26%	Shangla District	Malakand Division
Bisham Tehsil	184	121,279	659.13	34.77%	Shangla District	Malakand Division
Chakesar Tehsil	335	128,238	382.8	26.08%	Shangla District	Malakand Division
Martung Tehsil	188	103,205	548.96	24.01%	Shangla District	Malakand Division
Makhuzai Tehsil	...	...	...	...	Shangla District	Malakand Division
Shahpur Tehsil	...	...	...	...	Shangla District	Malakand Division
Puran Tehsil	297	171,758	578.31	35.11%	Shangla District	Malakand Division
Babuzai Tehsil	297	696,697	2,345.78	56.06%	Swat District	Malakand Division
Barikot Tehsil	419	220,148	525.41	50.87%	Swat District	Malakand Division
Charbagh Tehsil	161	159,358	989.8	50.01%	Swat District	Malakand Division
Kabal Tehsil	485	480,827	991.4	49.26%	Swat District	Malakand Division
Behrain Tehsil	2,899	270,623	93.35	39.26%	Upper Swat District	Malakand Division
Khwaza Khela Tehsil	392	307,300	783.93	42.63%	Upper Swat District	Malakand Division
Matta Tehsil	684	552,431	807.65	42.54%	Upper Swat District	Malakand Division
Buni Tehsil	...	...	...	...	Upper Chitral District	Malakand Division
Mulkoh Tehsil	...	...	...	...	Upper Chitral District	Malakand Division
Torkoh Tehsil	...	...	...	...	Upper Chitral District	Malakand Division
Mastuj Tehsil	8,392	195,528	23.3	73.83%	Upper Chitral District	Malakand Division
Barawal Tehsil	...	...	...	...	Upper Dir District	Malakand Division
Dir Tehsil	1,012	384,667	380.11	48.26%	Upper Dir District	Malakand Division
Kalkot Tehsil	...	...	...	...	Upper Dir District	Malakand Division
Sharingal Tehsil	1,140	210,356	184.52	37.15%	Upper Dir District	Malakand Division
Lar Jam Tehsil	1,039	119,396	114.91	52.59%	Central Dir District	Malakand Division
Wari Tehsil	508	369,147	726.67	48.56%	Central Dir District	Malakand Division
Akhagram Karo	...	...	...	...	Central Dir District	Malakand Division
Nehag Dara	...	...	...	...	Central Dir District	Malakand Division
Sahib Abad	...	...	...	...	Central Dir District	Malakand Division
Garhi Kapura Tehsil	143	319,465	2,234.02	51.70%	Mardan District	Mardan Division
Katlang Tehsil	422	377,535	894.63	61.47%	Mardan District	Mardan Division
Mardan Tehsil	335	1,040,893	3,107.14	56.41%	Mardan District	Mardan Division
Rustam Tehsil	379	279,527	737.54	49.98%	Mardan District	Mardan Division
Takht Bhai Tehsil	353	727,478	2,060.84	56.02%	Mardan District	Mardan Division
Lahor Tehsil	318	354,383	1,114.41	54.16%	Swabi District	Mardan Division
Razar Tehsil	418	682,303	1,632.30	56.61%	Swabi District	Mardan Division
Swabi Tehsil	389	475,352	1,221.98	63.23%	Swabi District	Mardan Division
Topi Tehsil	418	382,562	915.22	59.83%	Swabi District	Mardan Division
Charsadda Tehsil	445	909,438	2,043.68	58.56%	Charsadda District	Peshawar Division
Shabqadar Tehsil	204	440,524	2,159.43	49.65%	Charsadda District	Peshawar Division
Tangi Tehsil	347	485,542	1,399.26	48.85%	Charsadda District	Peshawar Division
Bagh Maidan Tehsil	...	...	...	...	Khyber District	Peshawar Division
Bara Tehsil	1,430	548,084	383.28	34.72%	Khyber District	Peshawar Division
Bazar Zakha Khel Tehsil	...	...	...	...	Khyber District	Peshawar Division
Fort Salop Tehsil	...	...	...	...	Khyber District	Peshawar Division
Jamrud Tehsil	311	243,290	782.28	46.18%	Khyber District	Peshawar Division
Landi Kotal Tehsil	679	312,313	459.96	38.92%	Khyber District	Peshawar Division
Mula Gori Tehsil	156	42,580	272.95	38.36%	Khyber District	Peshawar Division
Painda Cheena Tehsil	...	...	...	...	Khyber District	Peshawar Division
Ambar Utman Khel Tehsil	273	79,455	291.04	21.71%	Mohmand District	Peshawar Division
Halim Zai Tehsil	211	89,149	422.51	45.18%	Mohmand District	Peshawar Division
Pindiali Tehsil	454	112,247	247.24	29.11%	Mohmand District	Peshawar Division
Pran Ghar Tehsil	257	36,046	140.26	35.46%	Mohmand District	Peshawar Division
Safi Tehsil	322	109,620	340.43	26.21%	Mohmand District	Peshawar Division
Upper Mohmand	513	63,659	124.09	21.62%	Mohmand District	Peshawar Division
Yake Ghund Tehsil	266	63,757	239.69	41.38%	Mohmand District	Peshawar Division
Jehangira Tehsil	718	434,984	100.72	56.92%	Nowshera District	Peshawar Division
Nowshera Tehsil	679	796,226	106.39	56.76%	Nowshera District	Peshawar Division
Pabbi Tehsil	351	509,495	102.42	56.70%	Nowshera District	Peshawar Division
Badhber Tehsil	357	439,912	1,232.25	38.66%	Peshawar District	Peshawar Division
Chamkani Tehsil	226	624,354	2,762.63	54.72%	Peshawar District	Peshawar Division
Hassan Khel Tehsil	261	72,557	278	55.34%	Peshawar District	Peshawar Division
Mathra Tehsil	218	495,059	2,270.91	45.79%	Peshawar District	Peshawar Division
Peshawar City Tehsil	176	2,113,596	12,009.07	60.88%	Peshawar District	Peshawar Division
Peshtakhara Tehsil	135	480,436	3,558.79	45.45%	Peshawar District	Peshawar Division
Shah Alam Tehsil	145	532,848	3,674.81	44.96%	Peshawar District	Peshawar Division

=== List of tehsils of Punjab ===
Tehsil	Area (km²)	Population (2023)	Density (ppl/km²) (2023)	Literacy rate (2023)	Districts	Division
Bahawalnagar	1,729	976,049	564.52	53.50%	Bahawalnagar District	Bahawalpur Division
Chishtian	1,500	845,439	563.63	60.49%	Bahawalnagar District	Bahawalpur Division
Haroonabad	1,295	615,476	475.27	66.28%	Bahawalnagar District	Bahawalpur Division
Minchinabad	1,818	603,125	331.75	44.05%	Bahawalnagar District	Bahawalpur Division
Fort Abbas	2,536	510,253	201.20	61.36%	Bahawalnagar District	Bahawalpur Division
Ahmadpur East	1,738	1,307,578	752.35	39.68%	Bahawalpur District	Bahawalpur Division
Bahawalpur City	1,490	903,795	547.12	18.59%	Bahawalpur District	Bahawalpur Division
Yazman	18,374	687,237	37.40	53.55%	Bahawalpur District	Bahawalpur Division
Bahawalpur Saddar	745	675,950	907.32	52.56%	Bahawalpur District	Bahawalpur Division
Hasilpur	1,490	508,415	341.22	59.64%	Bahawalpur District	Bahawalpur Division
Khairpur Tamewali	993	290,582	292.63	45.82%	Bahawalpur District	Bahawalpur Division
Rahim Yar Khan	2,464	1,778,542	721.81	53.66%	Rahim Yar Khan District	Bahawalpur Division
Sadiqabad	2,964	1,381,759	466.18	47.04%	Rahim Yar Khan District	Bahawalpur Division
Liaqatpur	3,262	1,235,264	378.68	38.35%	Rahim Yar Khan District	Bahawalpur Division
Khanpur Katora	3,190	1,169,138	366.50	50.08%	Rahim Yar Khan District	Bahawalpur Division
Dera Ghazi Khan	2,012	1,443,409	717.40	47.25%	Dera Ghazi Khan District	Dera Ghazi Khan Division
Kot Chutta	1,802	904,836	502.13	38.61%	Dera Ghazi Khan District	Dera Ghazi Khan Division
Muhammadpur	...	...	...	...	Jampur District	Dera Ghazi Khan Division
Jampur	2,322	1,012,039	435.85	38.07%	Jampur District	Dera Ghazi Khan Division
Dajal	...	...	...	...	Jampur District	Dera Ghazi Khan Division
Jampur Tribal Area	...	...	...	...	Jampur District	Dera Ghazi Khan Division
Chowk Sarwar Shaheed	1,785	414,578	232.26	55.50%	Kot Addu District	Dera Ghazi Khan Division
Kot Addu	1,686	1,072,180	635.93	58.19%	Kot Addu District	Dera Ghazi Khan Division
Karor Lal Esan	1,823	684,729	375.61	62.43%	Layyah District	Dera Ghazi Khan Division
Chaubara	2,754	299,082	108.60	58.42%	Layyah District	Dera Ghazi Khan Division
Layyah	1,712	1,118,575	653.37	62.34%	Layyah District	Dera Ghazi Khan Division
Jatoi	1,010	862,046	853.51	40.67%	Muzaffargarh District	Dera Ghazi Khan Division
Alipur	1,391	760,526	546.75	39.15%	Muzaffargarh District	Dera Ghazi Khan Division
Muzaffargarh	2,377	1,905,995	801.85	46.84%	Muzaffargarh District	Dera Ghazi Khan Division
Rojhan	2,905	474,077	163.19	20.98%	Rajanpur District	Dera Ghazi Khan Division
Rajanpur	2,078	853,192	410.58	41.38%	Rajanpur District	Dera Ghazi Khan Division
De-Excluded Area Rajanpur	5,013	41,741	113.13	8.6%	Rajanpur District	Dera Ghazi Khan Division
Koh-e-Suleman	5,339	248,683	46.58	36.04%	Tonsa District	Dera Ghazi Khan Division
Tonsa	2,769	796,777	287.75	57.96%	Tonsa District	Dera Ghazi Khan Division
Wahova	...	...	...	...	Tonsa District	Dera Ghazi Khan Division
Bhowana	879	428,617	487.62	48.94%	Chiniot District	Faisalabad Division
Chiniot	709	633,621	893.68	57.31%	Chiniot District	Faisalabad Division
Lalian	1,055	500,786	474.68	57.26%	Chiniot District	Faisalabad Division
Chak Jhumra	654	385,169	588.94	70.56%	Faisalabad District	Faisalabad Division
Faisalabad City	168	3,691,999	21,976.18	81.59%	Faisalabad District	Faisalabad Division
Faisalabad Sadar	1,186	1,742,958	1,469.61	71.25%	Faisalabad District	Faisalabad Division
Jaranwala	1,811	1,731,148	955.91	66.32%	Faisalabad District	Faisalabad Division
Samundri	754	729,672	967.73	75.99%	Faisalabad District	Faisalabad Division
Tandlianwala	1,284	794,873	619.06	52.83%	Faisalabad District	Faisalabad Division
Shorkot	1,158	604,763	522.25	58.12%	Jhang District	Faisalabad Division
Jhang	2,591	1,640,676	633.22	60.96%	Jhang District	Faisalabad Division
Ahmadpur Sial	851	487,905	573.33	56.87%	Jhang District	Faisalabad Division
Athara Hazari	1,566	332,295	212.19	58.05%	Jhang District	Faisalabad Division
Mandi Shah Jeewna	N/A	N/A	N/A	N/A	Jhang District	Faisalabad Division
Kamalia	486	422,477	869.29	63.55%	Toba Tek Singh District	Faisalabad Division
Gojra	851	755,579	887.87	74.22%	Toba Tek Singh District	Faisalabad Division
Pirmahal	774	496,636	641.65	68.39%	Toba Tek Singh District	Faisalabad Division
Toba Tek Singh	1,141	849,352	744.39	74.45%	Toba Tek Singh District	Faisalabad Division
Gujrat	1,463	1,746,173	1,193.56	82.48%	Gujrat District	Gujrat Division
Kharian	1,154	1,174,935	1,018.14	79.69%	Gujrat District	Gujrat Division
Sarai Alamgir	575	298,267	518.73	81.55%	Gujrat District	Gujrat Division
Jalalpur Jattan	...	...	...	...	Gujrat District	Gujrat Division
Kunjah	...	...	...	...	Gujrat District	Gujrat Division
Pindi Bhattian	1,178	558,753	474.32	58.70%	Hafizabad District	Gujrat Division
Hafizabad	1,189	761,156	640.16	70.89%	Hafizabad District	Gujrat Division
Mandi Bahauddin	759	764,532	1,007.29	72.69%	Mandi Bahauddin District	Gujrat Division
Malakwal	759	429,303	565.62	66.28%	Mandi Bahauddin District	Gujrat Division
Phalia	1,155	635,651	550.35	70.11%	Mandi Bahauddin District	Gujrat Division
Wazirabad	1,196	993,412	830.61	77.39%	Wazirabad District	Gujrat Division
Ali Pur Chatta	...	...	...	...	Wazirabad District	Gujrat Division
Gujranwala City	131	2,511,118	19,168.84	79.39%	Gujranwala District	Gujranwala Division
Gujranwala Saddar	783	1,133,101	1,447.13	75.71%	Gujranwala District	Gujranwala Division
Kamoke	834	681,339	816.95	73.04%	Gujranwala District	Gujranwala Division
Nowshera Virkan	678	640,780	945.10	71.36%	Gujranwala District	Gujranwala Division
Shakargarh	835	769,339	921.36	76.28%	Narowal District	Gujranwala Division
Narowal	1,065	680,402	638.88	76.78%	Narowal District	Gujranwala Division
Zafarwal	437	501,213	1,146.94	71.72%	Narowal District	Gujranwala Division
Pasrur	975	970,366	995.25	74.52%	Sialkot District	Gujranwala Division
Daska	690	980,547	1,421.08	79.19%	Sialkot District	Gujranwala Division
Sambrial	450	460,280	1,022.84	79.89%	Sialkot District	Gujranwala Division
Sialkot	901	2,088,201	2,317.65	79.42%	Sialkot District	Gujranwala Division
Chunian	1,212	979,746	808.37	60.64%	Kasur District	Lahore Division
Kasur	1,493	1,603,658	1,074.12	63.63%	Kasur District	Lahore Division
Kot Radha Kishan	398	424,875	1,067.53	64.66%	Kasur District	Lahore Division
Pattoki	892	1,076,007	1,206.29	62.98%	Kasur District	Lahore Division
Lahore Cantonment	466	1,885,098	4,045.27	81.01%	Lahore District	Lahore Division
Lahore City	214	4,123,354	19,268.01	80.36%	Lahore District	Lahore Division
Model Town	353	3,244,906	9,192.37	78.94%	Lahore District	Lahore Division
Raiwind	467	1,080,637	2,314.00	72.35%	Lahore District	Lahore Division
Shalimar	272	2,670,140	9,816.69	81.21%	Lahore District	Lahore Division
Sangla Hill	223	269,993	1,210.73	72.08%	Nankana Sahib District	Lahore Division
Nankana Sahib	1,662	1,065,063	640.83	59.02%	Nankana Sahib District	Lahore Division
Shah Kot	331	299,815	905.79	69.28%	Nankana Sahib District	Lahore Division
Muridke	1,028	721,192	701.55	69.10%	Sheikhupura District	Lahore Division
Ferozewala	511	997,246	1,951.56	66.55%	Sheikhupura District	Lahore Division
Safdarabad	461	320,851	695.99	67.55 %	Sheikhupura District	Lahore Division
Sheikhupura	1,369	1,780,837	1,300.83	70.72%	Sheikhupura District	Lahore Division
Sharak Pur	375	229,292	611.45	65.05%	Sheikhupura District	Lahore Division
Jahanian	549	384,822	700.95	65.65%	Khanewal District	Multan Division
Kabirwala	1,804	1,119,229	620.42	54.13%	Khanewal District	Multan Division
Khanewal	784	987,445	1,259.50	63.60%	Khanewal District	Multan Division
Mian Channu	1,212	872,581	719.95	64.39%	Khanewal District	Multan Division
Dunyapur	889	571,333	642.67	55.66%	Lodhran District	Multan Division
Kahror Pacca	778	547,761	704.06	49.81%	Lodhran District	Multan Division
Lodhran	1,111	809,205	728.36	50.10%	Lodhran District	Multan Division
Jalalpur Pirwala	978	608,488	622.18	38.50%	Multan District	Multan Division
Multan City	304	2,555,486	8,406.20	73.65%	Multan District	Multan Division
Multan Saddar	1,632	1,516,004	928.92	52.01%	Multan District	Multan Division
Shujabad	806	682,327	846.56	53.87%	Multan District	Multan Division
Jallah jeem	N/A	N/A	N/A	N/A	Vehari District	Multan Division
Burewala	1,295	1,204,255	929.93	63.98%	Vehari District	Multan Division
Mailsi	1,639	1,120,407	683.59	54.63%	Vehari District	Multan Division
Vehari	1,430	1,105,759	773.26	58.21%	Vehari District	Multan Division
Attock	1,002	516,277	515.25	74.80%	Attock District	Rawalpindi Division
Fateh Jang	1,249	374,726	300.02	66.94%	Attock District	Rawalpindi Division
Hassan Abdal	350	253,670	724.77	70.22%	Attock District	Rawalpindi Division
Hazro	348	386,544	1,110.76	66.45%	Attock District	Rawalpindi Division
Jand	2,043	330,328	161.69	71.59%	Attock District	Rawalpindi Division
Pindi Gheb	1,865	308,878	165.62	70.36%	Attock District	Rawalpindi Division
Chakwal	2,167	768,622	354.69	79.63%	Chakwal District	Rawalpindi Division
Choa Saidan Shah	473	167,537	354.20	79.28%	Chakwal District	Rawalpindi Division
Kallar Kahar	953	196,449	206.14	79.23%	Chakwal District	Rawalpindi Division
Dina	678	277,182	408.82	84.75%	Jhelum District	Rawalpindi Division
Jhelum	586	507,788	866.53	83.45%	Jhelum District	Rawalpindi Division
Pind Dadan Khan	1,176	371,971	316.30	73.98%	Jhelum District	Rawalpindi Division
Sohawa	1,147	225,367	196.48	80.41%	Jhelum District	Rawalpindi Division
Rawalpindi	1,682	3,744,590	2,226.27	83.97%	Rawalpindi District	Rawalpindi Division
Gujar Khan	1,457	781,578	536.43	79.72%	Rawalpindi District	Rawalpindi Division
Kahuta	637	237,843	373.38	84.05%	Rawalpindi District	Rawalpindi Division
Kallar Syedan	459	242,709	528.78	82.23%	Rawalpindi District	Rawalpindi Division
Taxila	312	739,244	2,369.37	81.98%	Rawalpindi District	Rawalpindi Division
Daultala	N/A	N/A	N/A	N/A	Rawalpindi District	Rawalpindi Division
Kotli Sattian	304	120,421	396.12	88.20%	Murree District	Rawalpindi Division
Murree	434	252,526	581.86	84.79%	Murree District	Rawalpindi Division
Talagang	2,022	457,635	226.33	75.63%	Talagang District	Rawalpindi Division
Lawa	910	144,611	158.91	71.37%	Talagang District	Rawalpindi Division
Multan Khurd	...	...	...	75.63%	Talagang District	Rawalpindi Division
Depalpur	2,502	1,592,201	636.37	55.29%	Okara District	Sahiwal Division
Okara	1,241	1,393,746	1,123.08	63.34%	Okara District	Sahiwal Division
Renala Khurd	634	529,543	835.24	66.98%	Okara District	Sahiwal Division
Arifwala	1,241	999,278	805.22	58.24%	Pakpattan District	Sahiwal Division
Pakpattan	1,483	1,136,892	766.62	56.11%	Pakpattan District	Sahiwal Division
Chichawatni	1,591	1,155,978	726.57	65.25%	Sahiwal District	Sahiwal Division
Sahiwal	1,610	1,725,833	1,071.95	64.44%	Sahiwal District	Sahiwal Division
Khushab	2,115	816,682	386.14	65.94%	Khushab District	Sargodha Division
Noorpur Thal	2,500	264,597	105.84	55.58%	Khushab District	Sargodha Division
Quaidabad	1,080	274,959	254.59	55.11%	Khushab District	Sargodha Division
Naushera (Wadi-e-Soon)	816	144,851	177.51	70.43%	Khushab District	Sargodha Division
Bhalwal	663	387,262	584.11	79.31%	Sargodha District	Sargodha Division
Bhera	504	384,403	762.70	67.37%	Sargodha District	Sargodha Division
Kot Momin	948	544,208	574.06	56.33%	Sargodha District	Sargodha Division
Sahiwal	829	407,487	491.54	63.34%	Sargodha District	Sargodha Division
Sargodha	1,536	1,800,455	1,172.17	71.82%	Sargodha District	Sargodha Division
Shahpur	769	424,746	552.34	61.85%	Sargodha District	Sargodha Division
Sillanwali	607	385,887	635.73	63.07%	Sargodha District	Sargodha Division
Bhakkar	2,427	809,789	333.66	58.56%	Bhakkar District	Sargodha Division
Darya Khan	1,719	421,309	245.09	51.09%	Bhakkar District	Sargodha Division
Kaloorkot	2,239	415,708	185.67	55.43%	Bhakkar District	Sargodha Division
Mankera	1,768	310,664	175.71	54.83%	Bhakkar District	Sargodha Division
Isakhel	1,863	414,100	222.28	55.02%	Mianwali District	Sargodha Division
Mianwali	2,689	908,405	337.82	66.09%	Mianwali District	Sargodha Division
Piplan	1,288	475,763	369.38	63.46%	Mianwali District	Sargodha Division

=== List of tehsils of Sindh ===
Tehsil	Area (km^{2})	Population (2023)	Density (ppl/km^{2}) (2023)	Literacy rate (2023)	Districts	Divisions
Badin Tehsil	1,816	490,386	270.04	37.7%	Badin District	Hyderabad Division
Matli Tehsil	1,143	471,100	412.16	39.32%	Badin District	Hyderabad Division
Shaheed Fazil Rahu Tehsil	1,642	374,854	228.29	33.50%	Badin District	Hyderabad Division
Talhar Tehsil	569	184,206	323.74	34.16%	Badin District	Hyderabad Division
Tando Bago Tehsil	1,688	426,535	252.69	36.17%	Badin District	Hyderabad Division
Jati Tehsil	3,489	214,710	61.54	23.13%	Sujawal District	Hyderabad Division
Kharo Chan Tehsil	778	11,403	14.66	6.98%	Sujawal District	Hyderabad Division
Mirpur Bathoro Tehsil	698	231,735	332	32.01%	Sujawal District	Hyderabad Division
Shah Bandar Tehsil	3,074	168,911	54.95	15.97%	Sujawal District	Hyderabad Division
Sujawal Tehsil	746	212,533	284.90	35.02%	Sujawal District	Hyderabad Division
Ghorabari Tehsil	1,018	198,920	195.40	19.89%	Thatta District	Hyderabad Division
Keti Bunder	771	63,217	81.99	12.86%	Thatta District	Hyderabad Division
Mirpur Sakro Tehsil	2,958	376,078	127.14	27.95%	Thatta District	Hyderabad Division
Thatta Tehsil	3,823	444,976	116.39	30.90%	Thatta District	Hyderabad Division
Dadu Tehsil	846	508,607	601.19	64.39%	Dadu District	Hyderabad Division
Johi Tehsil	3,509	333,179	94.95	30.25%	Dadu District	Hyderabad Division
Khairpur Nathan Shah Tehsil	2,583	379,975	147.11	43.42%	Dadu District	Hyderabad Division
Mehar Tehsil	928	520,559	560.95	43.05%	Dadu District	Hyderabad Division
Hyderabad City Tehsil	43	778,132	18,096.09	73.74%	Hyderabad District	Hyderabad Division
Hyderabad Tehsil	711	511,265	719.08	42.57%	Hyderabad District	Hyderabad Division
Latifabad Tehsil	204	800,983	3,926.39	74.04%	Hyderabad District	Hyderabad Division
Qasimabad Tehsil	35	342,160	9,776.00	71.32%	Hyderabad District	Hyderabad Division
Kotri Tehsil	1,051	472,003	244.10	57.50%	Jamshoro District	Hyderabad Division
Sehwan Tehsil	2,160	322,011	149.08	41.91%	Jamshoro District	Hyderabad Division
Manjhand Tehsil	2,303	161,794	70.28	35.19%	Jamshoro District	Hyderabad Division
Thana Bulla Khan Tehsil	5,690	161,500	28.39	55.19%	Jamshoro District	Hyderabad Division
Hala Tehsil	488	286,155	586.38	52.58%	Matiari District	Hyderabad Division
Matiari Tehsil	568	377,945	665.40	39.64%	Matiari District	Hyderabad Division
Saeedabad Tehsil	361	185,283	513.25	48.11%	Matiari District	Hyderabad Division
Chamber Tehsil	483	233,424	483.28	29.96%	Tando Allahyar District	Hyderabad Division
Jhando Mari Tehsil	626	266,665	425.98	36.68%	Tando Allahyar District	Hyderabad Division
Tando Allahyar Tehsil	445	421,923	948.14	46.83%	Tando Allahyar District	Hyderabad Division
Bulri Shah Karim Tehsil	770	247,027	320.81	27.15%	Tando Muhammad Khan District	Hyderabad Division
Tando Ghulam Hyder Tehsil	390	206,665	529.91	30.26%	Tando Muhammad Khan District	Hyderabad Division
Tando Muhammad Khan Tehsil	263	272,427	1,035.84	42.70%	Tando Muhammad Khan District	Hyderabad Division
Gulberg Town	14	613,724	43,837.43	89.92%	Karachi Central District	Karachi Division
Liaquatabad Town	6	547,706	91,284.33	83.69%	Karachi Central District	Karachi Division
New Karachi Town	18	1,165,742	64,763.44	79.82%	Karachi Central District	Karachi Division
North Nazimabad Town	23	922,413	40,104.91	83.01%	Karachi Central District	Karachi Division
Nazimabad	8	572,740	71,592.50	84.73%	Karachi Central District	Karachi Division
Jamshed Town	11	656,014	59,637.64	85.99%	Karachi East District	Karachi Division
Ferozabad	20	1,167,692	58,384.60	83.02%	Karachi East District	Karachi Division
Gulshan-e-Iqbal	29	979,502	33,775.93	89.18%	Karachi East District	Karachi Division
Gulzar-e-Hijri	79	1,118,534	14,158.66	64.74%	Karachi East District	Karachi Division
Lyari Town	6	949,878	158,313.00	68.40%	Karachi South District	Karachi Division
Saddar Town	35	159,363	4,553.23	88.56%	Karachi South District	Karachi Division
Aram Bagh	4	237,224	59,306.00	86.43%	Karachi South District	Karachi Division
Civil Line	73	480,480	6,581.92	84.75%	Karachi South District	Karachi Division
Garden	4	502,819	125,704.75	84.50%	Karachi South District	Karachi Division
Orangi Town	9	596,919	66,324.33	60.76%	Karachi West District	Karachi Division
Manghopir	342	1,081,753	3,163.02	63.03	Karachi West District	Karachi Division
Mominabad	19	1,000,708	52,668.84	76.07%	Karachi West District	Karachi Division
Korangi Town	59	1,363,992	23,118.51	70.93%	Korangi District	Karachi Division
Landhi Town	19	681,294	35,857.58	84.60%	Korangi District	Karachi Division
Shah Faisal Town	21	641,894	30,566.38	89.60%	Korangi District	Karachi Division
Model Colony	9	441,791	49,087.89	86.85%	Korangi District	Karachi Division
Bin Qasim	447	322,915	722.40	62.19%	Malir District	Karachi Division
Gadap Town	1,104	100,351	90.90	58.94%	Malir District	Karachi Division
Airport	41	254,370	6,204.15	86.74%	Malir District	Karachi Division
Ibrahim Hyderi	97	1,341,638	13,831.32	57.91%	Malir District	Karachi Division
Murad Memon Goth	195	376,987	1,933.27	71.88%	Malir District	Karachi Division
Shah Mureed	276	35,987	130.39	49.70%	Malir District	Karachi Division
Keamari Town	50	451,801	9,036.02	55.61%	Keamari District	Karachi Division
Baldia Town	34	948,597	27,899.91	64.25%	Keamari District	Karachi Division
S.I.T.E. Town	25	449,120	17,964.80	68.48%	Keamari District	Karachi Division
Maripur	450	218,933	486.52	52.76%	Keamari District	Karachi Division
Garhi Khairo Tehsil	733	193,297	263.72	45.58%	Jacobabad District	Larkana Division
Jacobabad Tehsil	664	447,647	674.11	45.47%	Jacobabad District	Larkana Division
Thul Tehsil	1,301	533,153	409.81	38.53%	Jacobabad District	Larkana Division
Kandhkot Tehsil	654	407,592	623.23	37.91%	Kashmore District	Larkana Division
Kashmore Tehsil	1,262	487,601	386.37	32.65%	Kashmore District	Larkana Division
Tangwani Tehsil	664	338,764	510.19	36.95%	Kashmore District	Larkana Division
Bakrani Tehsil	425	275,268	647.69	46.38%	Larkana District	Larkana Division
Dokri Tehsil	412	257,394	624.74	49.19%	Larkana District	Larkana Division
Larkana Tehsil	549	873,868	1,591.74	58.76%	Larkana District	Larkana Division
Ratodero Tehsil	562	377,923	672.46	58.93%	Larkana District	Larkana Division
Mirokhan Tehsil	374	182,461	487.92	33.41%	Qambar Shahdadkot District	Larkana Division
Nasirabad Tehsil	309	174,708	565.47	41.81%	Qambar Shahdadkot District	Larkana Division
Qambar Tehsil	2,260	448,990	198.67	39.36%	Qambar Shahdadkot District	Larkana Division
Qubo Saeed Khan Tehsil	1,033	99,308	96.13	26.46%	Qambar Shahdadkot District	Larkana Division
Shahdadkot Tehsil	419	225,086	537.53	47.06%	Qambar Shahdadkot District	Larkana Division
Sijawal Junejo Tehsil	385	130,635	339.31	37.66%	Qambar Shahdadkot District	Larkana Division
Warah Tehsil	695	253,681	365.01	44.25%	Qambar Shahdadkot District	Larkana Division
Garhi Yasin Tehsil	971	333,289	343.24	42.76%	Shikarpur District	Larkana Division
Khanpur Tehsil	629	331,219	526.58	29.41%	Shikarpur District	Larkana Division
Lakhi Tehsil	351	300,490	856.10	49.43%	Shikarpur District	Larkana Division
Shikarpur Tehsil	561	421,332	751.04	50.99%	Shikarpur District	Larkana Division
Daharki Tehsil	2,088	335,145	160.51	36.84%	Ghotki District	Sukkur Division
Ghotki Tehsil	763	540,939	708.96	45.96%	Ghotki District	Sukkur Division
Khan Garh Tehsil (Khanpur)	1,986	162,318	81.73	39.01%	Ghotki District	Sukkur Division
Mirpur Mathelo Tehsil	593	350,647	591.31	42.66%	Ghotki District	Sukkur Division
Ubauro Tehsil	653	383,560	587.38	38.39%	Ghotki District	Sukkur Division
Faiz Ganj Tehsil	946	243,254	257.14	46.43%	Khairpur District	Sukkur Division
Gambat Tehsil	582	286,129	491.63	52.89%	Khairpur District	Sukkur Division
Khairpur Tehsil	585	465,233	795.27	59.37%	Khairpur District	Sukkur Division
Kingri Tehsil	531	370,304	697.37	49.04%	Khairpur District	Sukkur Division
Kot Diji Tehsil	520	385,872	742.06	45.29%	Khairpur District	Sukkur Division
Nara Tehsil	11,611	173,968	14.98	34.47%	Khairpur District	Sukkur Division
Sobho Dero Tehsil	504	293,160	581.67	49.88%	Khairpur District	Sukkur Division
Thari Mirwah Tehsil	631	379,615	601.61	51.22%	Khairpur District	Sukkur Division
New Sukkur Tehsil	109	356,473	3,270.39	57.96%	Sukkur District	Sukkur Division
Pano Akil Tehsil	1,042	457,078	438.65	58.54%	Sukkur District	Sukkur Division
Rohri Tehsil	807	421,500	522.30	49.93%	Sukkur District	Sukkur Division
Salehpat Tehsil	2,957	137,738	46.58	34.50%	Sukkur District	Sukkur Division
Sukkur Tehsil	250	267,108	1,068.43	79.43%	Sukkur District	Sukkur Division
Bhiria Tehsil	488	330,308	676.86	58.14%	Naushahro Feroze District	Shaheed Benazirabad Division
Kandiaro Tehsil	771	356,506	462.39	64.04%	Naushahro Feroze District	Shaheed Benazirabad Division
Mehrabpur Tehsil	361	273,764	758.35	60.92%	Naushahro Feroze District	Shaheed Benazirabad Division
Moro Tehsil	609	408,148	670.19	53.87%	Naushahro Feroze District	Shaheed Benazirabad Division
Naushahro Feroze Tehsil	717	408,356	569.53	51.24%	Naushahro Feroze District	Shaheed Benazirabad Division
Kazi Ahmed Tehsil	972	402,834	414.44	47.11%	Shaheed Benazirabad District	Shaheed Benazirabad Division
Daur Tehsil (2004)	2,210	532,621	241.00	41.36%	Shaheed Benazirabad District	Shaheed Benazirabad Division
Nawabshah Tehsil (1907)	435	481,978	1,108.00	62.44%	Shaheed Benazirabad District	Shaheed Benazirabad Division
Sakrand Tehsil (1858)	885	427,669	483.24	52.84%	Shaheed Benazirabad District	Shaheed Benazirabad Division
Jam Nawaz Ali Tehsil	440	171,598	390.00	31.67%	Sanghar District	Shaheed Benazirabad Division
Khipro Tehsil	5,933	366,748	61.81	37.04%	Sanghar District	Shaheed Benazirabad Division
Sanghar Tehsil	2,118	482,560	227.84	40.00%	Sanghar District	Shaheed Benazirabad Division
Shahdadpur Tehsil	890	525,164	590.07	50.69%	Sanghar District	Shaheed Benazirabad Division
Sinjhoro Tehsil	907	354,709	391.08	42.02%	Sanghar District	Shaheed Benazirabad Division
Tando Adam Khan Tehsil	440	407,686	926.56	50.81%	Sanghar District	Shaheed Benazirabad Division
Digri Tehsil	572	234,578	410.10	46.10%	Mirpur Khas District	Mirpur Khas Division
Hussain Bux Mari Tehsil	209	172,143	823.70	33.26%	Mirpur Khas District	Mirpur Khas Division
Jhuddo Tehsil	363	230,285	634.39	38.59%	Mirpur Khas District	Mirpur Khas Division
Kot Ghulam Muhammad Tehsil	762	310,142	407.01	41.19%	Mirpur Khas District	Mirpur Khas Division
Mirpur Khas Tehsil	24	287,802	11,991.75	74.63%	Mirpur Khas District	Mirpur Khas Division
Shujabad Tehsil	396	185,654	468.82	39.46%	Mirpur Khas District	Mirpur Khas Division
Sindhri Tehsil	599	260,782	435.36	31.99%	Mirpur Khas District	Mirpur Khas Division
Chachro Tehsil	3,386	371,769	109.80	31.07%	Tharparkar District	Mirpur Khas Division
Dahli Tehsil	2,126	326,034	153.36	31.47%	Tharparkar District	Mirpur Khas Division
Diplo Tehsil	2,872	163,119	56.80	46.10%	Tharparkar District	Mirpur Khas Division
Kaloi Tehsil	922	129,677	140.65	37.91%	Tharparkar District	Mirpur Khas Division
Islamkot Tehsil	3,515	265,643	75.57	36.01%	Tharparkar District	Mirpur Khas Division
Mithi Tehsil	2,954	239,091	80.94	49.84%	Tharparkar District	Mirpur Khas Division
Nagarparkar Tehsil	3,862	283,074	73.30	29.49%	Tharparkar District	Mirpur Khas Division
Kunri Tehsil	585	237,063	405.24	38.72%	Umerkot District	Mirpur Khas Division
Pithoro Tehsil	855	130,383	152.49	39.90%	Umerkot District	Mirpur Khas Division
Samaro Tehsil	959	184,051	191.92	29.72%	Umerkot District	Mirpur Khas Division
Umerkot Tehsil	3,209	608,334	189.57	41.00%	Umerkot District	Mirpur Khas Division

== Territories ==
=== List of tehsils of Azad Kashmir ===
Tehsil	Area (km^{2})	Population (2017)	Density (people/km2) (2017)	Literacy Rate (2017)	District	Division
Kotli Tehsil		4,00,000			Kotli District	Mirpur Division
Khuiratta Tehsil		70,000+			Kotli District	Mirpur Division
Fatehpur Thakiala Tehsil		60,000+			Kotli District	Mirpur Division
Sehnsa Tehsil		80,000+			Kotli District	Mirpur Division
Charhoi Tehsil		80,000+			Kotli District	Mirpur Division
Duliah Jattan Tehsil		70,000+			Kotli District	Mirpur Division
Dadyal Tehsil		1,20,000			Mirpur District	Mirpur Division
Mirpur Tehsil		5,00,000			Mirpur District	Mirpur Division
Islamgarh Tehsil		80,000			Mirpur District	Mirpur Division
Bhimber Tehsil		3,00,000			Bhimber District	Mirpur Division
Barnala Tehsil		1,00,000			Bhimber District	Mirpur Division
Samahni Tehsil		90,000			Bhimber District	Mirpur Division
Hattian Bala Tehsil		2,00,000			Hattian Bala District	Muzaffarabad Division
Chikkar Tehsil		70,000			Hattian Bala District	Muzaffarabad Division
Leepa Tehsil		60,000			Hattian Bala District	Muzaffarabad Division
Muzaffarabad Tehsil		5,00,000+			Muzaffarabad District	Muzaffarabad Division
Nasirbad Tehsil		80,000+			Muzaffarabad District	Muzaffarabad Division
Athmuqam Tehsil		2,00,000			Neelum District	Muzaffarabad Division
Sharda Tehsil		50,000			Neelum District	Muzaffarabad Division
Bagh Tehsil		2,00,000			Bagh District	Poonch Division
Dhirkot Tehsil		1,00,000+			Bagh District	Poonch Division
Hari Ghel Tehsil		70,000			Bagh District	Poonch Division
Rera Tehsil		90,000			Bagh District	Poonch Division
Birpani Tehsil		50,000			Bagh District	Poonch Division
Haveli Tehsil		1,50,000			Haveli District	Poonch Division
Khurshidabad Tehsil		70,000			Haveli District	Poonch Division
Mumtazabad Tehsil		60,000			Haveli District	Poonch Division
Abbaspur Tehsil		1,00,000			Poonch District	Poonch Division
Hajira Tehsil		90,000+			Poonch District	Poonch Division
Rawalakot Tehsil		4,00,000			Poonch District	Poonch Division
Thorar Tehsil		80,000			Poonch District	Poonch Division
Balouch Tehsil		90,000			Sudhnoti District	Poonch Division
Mang Tehsil		80,000			Sudhnoti District	Poonch Division
Pallandri Tehsil		3,00,000			Sudhnoti District	Poonch Division
Tarar Khel Tehsil		80,000			Sudhnoti District	Poonch Division

=== List of tehsils of Gilgit-Baltistan ===
Tehsil	Districts	Division
Daghoni Tehsil	Ghanche District	Baltistan Division
Khaplu Tehsil	Ghanche District	Baltistan Division
Mashabrum Tehsil	Ghanche District	Baltistan Division
Chorbat Tehsil	Ghanche District	Baltistan Division
Keris Tehsil	Ghanche District	Baltistan Division
Haldi Tehsil (Ghowari Tehsil)	Ghanche District	Baltistan Division
Shigar Tehsil	Shigar District	Baltistan Division
Gulabpur Tehsil	Shigar District	Baltistan Division
Gultari Tehsil	Skardu District	Baltistan Division
Roundu Tehsil	Skardu District	Baltistan Division
Skardu Tehsil	Skardu District	Baltistan Division
Gamba Tehsil	Skardu District	Baltistan Division
Kharmang Tehsil	Kharmang District	Baltistan Division
Astore Tehsil	Astore District	Diamer Division
Shounter Tehsil	Astore District	Diamer Division
Babusar Tehsil	Diamir District	Diamer Division
Darel Tehsil	Diamir District	Diamer Division
Tangir Tehsil	Diamir District	Diamer Division
Chilas Tehsil	Diamir District	Diamer Division
Goharabad Tehsil	Diamir District	Diamer Division
Punial Tehsil	Ghizer District	Gilgit Division
Gupis Tehsil	Ghizer District	Gilgit Division
Yasin Tehsil	Ghizer District	Gilgit Division
Phander Tehsil	Ghizer District	Gilgit Division
Ishkoman Tehsil	Ghizer District	Gilgit Division
Danyor Tehsil	Gilgit District	Gilgit Division
Gilgit Tehsil	Gilgit District	Gilgit Division
Jaglot Tehsil	Gilgit District	Gilgit Division
Aliabad Tehsil	Hunza District	Gilgit Division
Gojal Tehsil	Hunza District	Gilgit Division
Shinaki Tehsil	Hunza District	Gilgit Division
Nagar-I Tehsil	Nagar District	Gilgit Division
Sikandarabad Nagar-II Tehsil	Nagar District	Gilgit Division
Chalt Tehsil	Nagar District	Gilgit Division

The tehsil map of Gilgit-Baltistan, circa 2008

== See also ==
- Districts of Pakistan
  - Districts of Khyber Pakhtunkhwa, Pakistan
  - Districts of Punjab, Pakistan
  - Districts of Balochistan, Pakistan
  - Districts of Sindh, Pakistan
  - Districts of Azad Kashmir
  - Districts of Gilgit-Baltistan
- Divisions of Pakistan
  - Divisions of Balochistan
  - Divisions of Khyber Pakhtunkhwa
  - Divisions of Punjab
  - Divisions of Sindh
  - Divisions of Azad Kashmir
  - Divisions of Gilgit-Baltistan
