= List of tehsils of Punjab, Pakistan =

Tehsils of Punjab
- Tehsils of Punjab with their names as of 2025
- Location: Punjab, Pakistan
- Number: 157 (as of 2026)
- Government: Tehsil Council
- Subdivisions: Union councils

In Pakistan, a tehsil is an administrative sub-division of a district. Those are sub-divided into union councils.

== List of the Tehsils of Punjab ==
Tehsil	Area (km^{2})	Population (2023)	Density (ppl/km^{2}) (2023)	Literacy rate (2023)	Districts	Division
Bahawalnagar	1,729	976,049	564.52	53.50%	Bahawalnagar District	Bahawalpur Division
Chishtian	1,500	845,439	563.63	60.49%	Bahawalnagar District	Bahawalpur Division
Haroonabad	1,295	615,476	475.27	66.28%	Bahawalnagar District	Bahawalpur Division
Minchinabad	1,818	603,125	331.75	44.05%	Bahawalnagar District	Bahawalpur Division
Fort Abbas	2,536	510,253	201.20	61.36%	Bahawalnagar District	Bahawalpur Division
Ahmadpur East	1,738	1,307,578	752.35	39.68%	Bahawalpur District	Bahawalpur Division
Bahawalpur City	1,490	903,795	547.12	18.59%	Bahawalpur District	Bahawalpur Division
Yazman	18,374	687,237	37.40	53.55%	Bahawalpur District	Bahawalpur Division
Bahawalpur Saddar	745	675,950	907.32	52.56%	Bahawalpur District	Bahawalpur Division
Hasilpur	1,490	508,415	341.22	59.64%	Bahawalpur District	Bahawalpur Division
Khairpur Tamewali	993	290,582	292.63	45.82%	Bahawalpur District	Bahawalpur Division
Rahim Yar Khan	2,464	1,778,542	721.81	53.66%	Rahim Yar Khan District	Bahawalpur Division
Sadiqabad	2,964	1,381,759	466.18	47.04%	Rahim Yar Khan District	Bahawalpur Division
Liaqatpur	3,262	1,235,264	378.68	38.35%	Rahim Yar Khan District	Bahawalpur Division
Khanpur Katora	3,190	1,169,138	366.50	50.08%	Rahim Yar Khan District	Bahawalpur Division
Dera Ghazi Khan	2,012	1,443,409	717.40	47.25%	Dera Ghazi Khan District	Dera Ghazi Khan Division
Kot Chutta	1,802	904,836	502.13	38.61%	Dera Ghazi Khan District	Dera Ghazi Khan Division
Muhammadpur	...	...	...	...	Jampur District	Dera Ghazi Khan Division
Jampur	2,322	1,012,039	435.85	38.07%	Jampur District	Dera Ghazi Khan Division
Dajal	...	...	...	...	Jampur District	Dera Ghazi Khan Division
Jampur Tribal Area	...	...	...	...	Jampur District	Dera Ghazi Khan Division
Chowk Sarwar Shaheed	1,785	414,578	232.26	55.50%	Kot Addu District	Dera Ghazi Khan Division
Kot Addu	1,686	1,072,180	635.93	58.19%	Kot Addu District	Dera Ghazi Khan Division
Karor Lal Esan	1,823	684,729	375.61	62.43%	Layyah District	Dera Ghazi Khan Division
Chaubara	2,754	299,082	108.60	58.42%	Layyah District	Dera Ghazi Khan Division
Layyah	1,712	1,118,575	653.37	62.34%	Layyah District	Dera Ghazi Khan Division
Jatoi	1,010	862,046	853.51	40.67%	Muzaffargarh District	Dera Ghazi Khan Division
Alipur	1,391	760,526	546.75	39.15%	Muzaffargarh District	Dera Ghazi Khan Division
Muzaffargarh	2,377	1,905,995	801.85	46.84%	Muzaffargarh District	Dera Ghazi Khan Division
Rojhan	2,905	474,077	163.19	20.98%	Rajanpur District	Dera Ghazi Khan Division
Rajanpur	2,078	853,192	410.58	41.38%	Rajanpur District	Dera Ghazi Khan Division
De-Excluded Area Rajanpur	5,013	41,741	113.13	8.6%	Rajanpur District	Dera Ghazi Khan Division
Koh-e-Suleman	5,339	248,683	46.58	36.04%	Tonsa District	Dera Ghazi Khan Division
Tonsa	2,769	796,777	287.75	57.96%	Tonsa District	Dera Ghazi Khan Division
Wahova	...	...	...	...	Tonsa District	Dera Ghazi Khan Division
Bhowana	879	428,617	487.62	48.94%	Chiniot District	Faisalabad Division
Chiniot	709	633,621	893.68	57.31%	Chiniot District	Faisalabad Division
Lalian	1,055	500,786	474.68	57.26%	Chiniot District	Faisalabad Division
Chak Jhumra	654	385,169	588.94	70.56%	Faisalabad District	Faisalabad Division
Faisalabad City	168	3,691,999	21,976.18	81.59%	Faisalabad District	Faisalabad Division
Faisalabad Sadar	1,186	1,742,958	1,469.61	71.25%	Faisalabad District	Faisalabad Division
Jaranwala	1,811	1,731,148	955.91	66.32%	Faisalabad District	Faisalabad Division
Samundri	754	729,672	967.73	75.99%	Faisalabad District	Faisalabad Division
Tandlianwala	1,284	794,873	619.06	52.83%	Faisalabad District	Faisalabad Division
Shorkot	1,158	604,763	522.25	58.12%	Jhang District	Faisalabad Division
Jhang	2,591	1,640,676	633.22	60.96%	Jhang District	Faisalabad Division
Ahmadpur Sial	851	487,905	573.33	56.87%	Jhang District	Faisalabad Division
Athara Hazari	1,566	332,295	212.19	58.05%	Jhang District	Faisalabad Division
Mandi Shah Jeewna	N/A	N/A	N/A	N/A	Jhang District	Faisalabad Division
Kamalia	486	422,477	869.29	63.55%	Toba Tek Singh District	Faisalabad Division
Gojra	851	755,579	887.87	74.22%	Toba Tek Singh District	Faisalabad Division
Pirmahal	774	496,636	641.65	68.39%	Toba Tek Singh District	Faisalabad Division
Toba Tek Singh	1,141	849,352	744.39	74.45%	Toba Tek Singh District	Faisalabad Division
Gujrat	1,463	1,746,173	1,193.56	82.48%	Gujrat District	Gujrat Division
Kharian	1,154	1,174,935	1,018.14	79.69%	Gujrat District	Gujrat Division
Sarai Alamgir	575	298,267	518.73	81.55%	Gujrat District	Gujrat Division
Jalalpur Jattan	...	...	...	...	Gujrat District	Gujrat Division
Kunjah	...	...	...	...	Gujrat District	Gujrat Division
Pindi Bhattian	1,178	558,753	474.32	58.70%	Hafizabad District	Gujrat Division
Hafizabad	1,189	761,156	640.16	70.89%	Hafizabad District	Gujrat Division
Mandi Bahauddin	759	764,532	1,007.29	72.69%	Mandi Bahauddin District	Gujrat Division
Malakwal	759	429,303	565.62	66.28%	Mandi Bahauddin District	Gujrat Division
Phalia	1,155	635,651	550.35	70.11%	Mandi Bahauddin District	Gujrat Division
Wazirabad	1,196	993,412	830.61	77.39%	Wazirabad District	Gujrat Division
Ali Pur Chatta	...	...	...	...	Wazirabad District	Gujrat Division
Gujranwala City	131	2,511,118	19,168.84	79.39%	Gujranwala District	Gujranwala Division
Gujranwala Saddar	783	1,133,101	1,447.13	75.71%	Gujranwala District	Gujranwala Division
Kamoke	834	681,339	816.95	73.04%	Gujranwala District	Gujranwala Division
Nowshera Virkan	678	640,780	945.10	71.36%	Gujranwala District	Gujranwala Division
Shakargarh	835	769,339	921.36	76.28%	Narowal District	Gujranwala Division
Narowal	1,065	680,402	638.88	76.78%	Narowal District	Gujranwala Division
Zafarwal	437	501,213	1,146.94	71.72%	Narowal District	Gujranwala Division
Pasrur	975	970,366	995.25	74.52%	Sialkot District	Gujranwala Division
Daska	690	980,547	1,421.08	79.19%	Sialkot District	Gujranwala Division
Sambrial	450	460,280	1,022.84	79.89%	Sialkot District	Gujranwala Division
Sialkot	901	2,088,201	2,317.65	79.42%	Sialkot District	Gujranwala Division
Chunian	1,212	979,746	808.37	60.64%	Kasur District	Lahore Division
Kasur	1,493	1,603,658	1,074.12	63.63%	Kasur District	Lahore Division
Kot Radha Kishan	398	424,875	1,067.53	64.66%	Kasur District	Lahore Division
Pattoki	892	1,076,007	1,206.29	62.98%	Kasur District	Lahore Division
Lahore Cantt	466	1,885,098	4,045.27	81.01%	Lahore District	Lahore Division
Lahore City	214	4,123,354	19,268.01	80.36%	Lahore District	Lahore Division
Model Town	353	3,244,906	9,192.37	78.94%	Lahore District	Lahore Division
Raiwind	467	1,080,637	2,314.00	72.35%	Lahore District	Lahore Division
Shalimar	272	2,670,140	9,816.69	81.21%	Lahore District	Lahore Division
Sangla Hill	223	269,993	1,210.73	72.08%	Nankana Sahib District	Lahore Division
Nankana Sahib	1,662	1,065,063	640.83	59.02%	Nankana Sahib District	Lahore Division
Shah Kot	331	299,815	905.79	69.28%	Nankana Sahib District	Lahore Division
Muridke	1,028	721,192	701.55	69.10%	Sheikhupura District	Lahore Division
Ferozewala	511	997,246	1,951.56	66.55%	Sheikhupura District	Lahore Division
Safdarabad	461	320,851	695.99	67.55 %	Sheikhupura District	Lahore Division
Sheikhupura	1,369	1,780,837	1,300.83	70.72%	Sheikhupura District	Lahore Division
Sharak Pur	375	229,292	611.45	65.05%	Sheikhupura District	Lahore Division
Jahanian	549	384,822	700.95	65.65%	Khanewal District	Multan Division
Kabirwala	1,804	1,119,229	620.42	54.13%	Khanewal District	Multan Division
Khanewal	784	987,445	1,259.50	63.60%	Khanewal District	Multan Division
Mian Channu	1,212	872,581	719.95	64.39%	Khanewal District	Multan Division
Dunyapur	889	571,333	642.67	55.66%	Lodhran District	Multan Division
Kahror Pacca	778	547,761	704.06	49.81%	Lodhran District	Multan Division
Lodhran	1,111	809,205	728.36	50.10%	Lodhran District	Multan Division
Jalalpur Pirwala	978	608,488	622.18	38.50%	Multan District	Multan Division
Multan City	304	2,555,486	8,406.20	73.65%	Multan District	Multan Division
Multan Saddar	1,632	1,516,004	928.92	52.01%	Multan District	Multan Division
Shujabad	806	682,327	846.56	53.87%	Multan District	Multan Division
Jallah jeem	N/A	N/A	N/A	N/A	Vehari District	Multan Division
Burewala	1,295	1,204,255	929.93	63.98%	Vehari District	Multan Division
Mailsi	1,639	1,120,407	683.59	54.63%	Vehari District	Multan Division
Vehari	1,430	1,105,759	773.26	58.21%	Vehari District	Multan Division
Attock	1,002	516,277	515.25	74.80%	Attock District	Rawalpindi Division
Fateh Jang	1,249	374,726	300.02	66.94%	Attock District	Rawalpindi Division
Hassan Abdal	350	253,670	724.77	70.22%	Attock District	Rawalpindi Division
Hazro	348	386,544	1,110.76	66.45%	Attock District	Rawalpindi Division
Jand	2,043	330,328	161.69	71.59%	Attock District	Rawalpindi Division
Pindi Gheb	1,865	308,878	165.62	70.36%	Attock District	Rawalpindi Division
Chakwal	2,167	768,622	354.69	79.63%	Chakwal District	Rawalpindi Division
Choa Saidan Shah	473	167,537	354.20	79.28%	Chakwal District	Rawalpindi Division
Kallar Kahar	953	196,449	206.14	79.23%	Chakwal District	Rawalpindi Division
Dina	678	277,182	408.82	84.75%	Jhelum District	Rawalpindi Division
Jhelum	586	507,788	866.53	83.45%	Jhelum District	Rawalpindi Division
Pind Dadan Khan	1,176	371,971	316.30	73.98%	Jhelum District	Rawalpindi Division
Sohawa	1,147	225,367	196.48	80.41%	Jhelum District	Rawalpindi Division
Rawalpindi	1,682	3,744,590	2,226.27	83.97%	Rawalpindi District	Rawalpindi Division
Gujar Khan	1,457	781,578	536.43	79.72%	Rawalpindi District	Rawalpindi Division
Kahuta	637	237,843	373.38	84.05%	Rawalpindi District	Rawalpindi Division
Kallar Syedan	459	242,709	528.78	82.23%	Rawalpindi District	Rawalpindi Division
Taxila	312	739,244	2,369.37	81.98%	Rawalpindi District	Rawalpindi Division
Daultala	N/A	N/A	N/A	N/A	Rawalpindi District	Rawalpindi Division
Kotli Sattian	304	120,421	396.12	88.20%	Murree District	Rawalpindi Division
Murree	434	252,526	581.86	84.79%	Murree District	Rawalpindi Division
Talagang	2,022	457,635	226.33	75.63%	Talagang District	Rawalpindi Division
Lawa	910	144,611	158.91	71.37%	Talagang District	Rawalpindi Division
Multan Khurd	...	...	...	75.63%	Talagang District	Rawalpindi Division
Depalpur	2,502	1,592,201	636.37	55.29%	Okara District	Sahiwal Division
Okara	1,241	1,393,746	1,123.08	63.34%	Okara District	Sahiwal Division
Renala Khurd	634	529,543	835.24	66.98%	Okara District	Sahiwal Division
Arifwala	1,241	999,278	805.22	58.24%	Pakpattan District	Sahiwal Division
Pakpattan	1,483	1,136,892	766.62	56.11%	Pakpattan District	Sahiwal Division
Chichawatni	1,591	1,155,978	726.57	65.25%	Sahiwal District	Sahiwal Division
Sahiwal	1,610	1,725,833	1,071.95	64.44%	Sahiwal District	Sahiwal Division
Khushab	2,115	816,682	386.14	65.94%	Khushab District	Sargodha Division
Noorpur Thal	2,500	264,597	105.84	55.58%	Khushab District	Sargodha Division
Quaidabad	1,080	274,959	254.59	55.11%	Khushab District	Sargodha Division
Naushera (Wadi-e-Soon)	816	144,851	177.51	70.43%	Khushab District	Sargodha Division
Bhalwal	663	387,262	584.11	79.31%	Sargodha District	Sargodha Division
Bhera	504	384,403	762.70	67.37%	Sargodha District	Sargodha Division
Kot Momin	948	544,208	574.06	56.33%	Sargodha District	Sargodha Division
Sahiwal	829	407,487	491.54	63.34%	Sargodha District	Sargodha Division
Sargodha	1,536	1,800,455	1,172.17	71.82%	Sargodha District	Sargodha Division
Shahpur	769	424,746	552.34	61.85%	Sargodha District	Sargodha Division
Sillanwali	607	385,887	635.73	63.07%	Sargodha District	Sargodha Division
Bhakkar	2,427	809,789	333.66	58.56%	Bhakkar District	Sargodha Division
Darya Khan	1,719	421,309	245.09	51.09%	Bhakkar District	Sargodha Division
Kaloorkot	2,239	415,708	185.67	55.43%	Bhakkar District	Sargodha Division
Mankera	1,768	310,664	175.71	54.83%	Bhakkar District	Sargodha Division
Isakhel	1,863	414,100	222.28	55.02%	Mianwali District	Sargodha Division
Mianwali	2,689	908,405	337.82	66.09%	Mianwali District	Sargodha Division
Piplan	1,288	475,763	369.38	63.46%	Mianwali District	Sargodha Division

== List of the tehsils by population over the years ==
Tehsil	Population (2023)	Population (2017)	Population (1998)	Population (1981)	Population (1972)	Population (1961)	Population (1951)
Bahawalnagar	976,049	813,390	541,553	367,367	309,199	228,598	182,683
Chishtian	845,439	691,221	498,270	326,790	254,448	197,437	148,868
Fort Abbas	510,253	422,768	285,596	195,476	136,060	102,362	64,749
Haroonabad	615,476	525,598	381,767	258,276	188,199	156,230	115,284
Minchinabad	603,125	526,428	354,261	225,838	185,985	138,200	118,846
Ahmadpur East	1,307,578						
Bahawalpur City	815,202						
Bahawalpur Saddar	675,950						
Hasilpur	508,415						
Khairpur Tamewali	290,582						
Yazman	687,237						
Khanpur Katora	1,169,138	982,085	683,865	420,688	325,447	227,722	108,335
Liaqatpur	1,235,264						
Rahim Yar Khan	1,778,542						
Sadiqabad	1,381,759						
Dera Ghazi Khan	1,443,409						
Kot Chutta	904,836						
Muhammadpur	...						
Jampur	1,012,039						
Dajal	...						
Jampur Tribal Area	...						
Chowk Sarwar Shaheed	414,578						
Kot Addu	1,072,180						
Karor Lal Esan	684,729						
Chaubara	299,082						
Layyah	1,118,575						
Jatoi	862,046						
Alipur	760,526						
Muzaffargarh	1,905,995						
Rojhan	474,077	405,689	208,563	126,654	93,801	63,188	46,500
Rajanpur	853,192	706,770	395,953	214,517	156,405	104,533	85,071
De-Excluded Area Rajanpur	41,741	34,191	14,051	21,492	5,399	6,968	3,610
Koh-e-Suleman	248,683	212,652	126,198	82,251	59,296	44,925	41,406
Taunsa	796,777						
Wahova	...						
Bhowana	428,617						
Chiniot	633,621						
Lalian	500,786						
Chak Jhumra	385,169						
Faisalabad City	3,691,999						
Faisalabad Sadar	1,742,958						
Jaranwala	1,731,148						
Samundri	729,672						
Tandlianwala	794,873						
Shorkot	604,763						
Jhang	1,640,676						
Ahmadpur Sial	487,905						
Athara Hazari	332,295						
Mandi Shah Jeewna	...						
Kamalia	422,477						
Gojra	755,579						
Pirmahal	496,636						
Toba Tek Singh	849,352						
Gujrat	1,746,173						
Kharian	1,174,935						
Sarai Alamgir	298,267						
Jalalpur Jattan	...						
Kunjah	...						
Pindi Bhattian	558,753						
Hafizabad	761,156						
Mandi Bahauddin	764,532						
Malakwal	429,303						
Phalia	635,651						
Wazirabad	993,412						
Ali Pur Chatta	...						
Gujranwala City	2,511,118						
Gujranwala Saddar	1,133,101						
Kamoke	681,339						
Nowshera Virkan	640,780						
Shakargarh	769,339	672,030	520,855	...	...	...	...
Narowal	680,402	596,539	425,879	...	...	...	...
Zafarwal	501,213	439,006	318,363	...	...	...	...
Pasrur	970,366	840,847	611,871	...	...	...	...
Daska	980,547	847,117	605,435	...	...	...	...
Sambrial	460,280	410,823	298,431	...	...	...	...
Sialkot	2,088,201	1,796,151	1,207,744	...	...	...	...
Chunian	979,746						
Kasur	1,603,658						
Kot Radha Kishan	424,875						
Pattoki	1,076,007						
Lahore Cantt	1,885,098						
Lahore City	4,123,354						
Model Town	3,244,906						
Raiwind	1,080,637						
Shalimar	2,670,140						
Nishter	...						
Wagah	...						
Iqbal	...						
Ravi	...						
Lahore Saddar	...						
Sangla Hill	269,993						
Nankana Sahib	1,065,063						
Shah Kot	299,815						
Muridke	721,192	639,589	452,369				
Ferozewala	997,246	794,489	396,069				
Safdarabad	320,851	272,807	227,715				
Sheikhupura	1,780,837	1,555,660	1,049,264				
Sharak Pur	229,292	197,459	150,747				
Jahanian	384,822						
Kabirwala	1,119,229						
Khanewal	987,445						
Mian Channu	872,581						
Dunyapur	571,333						
Kahror Pacca	547,761						
Lodhran	809,205						
Jalalpur Pirwala	608,488						
Multan City	2,555,486						
Multan Saddar	1,516,004						
Shujabad	682,327						
Jallah jeem	...						
Burewala	1,204,255						
Mailsi	1,120,407						
Vehari	1,105,759						
Attock	516,277						
Fateh Jang	374,726						
Hassan Abdal	253,670						
Hazro	386,544						
Jand	330,328						
Pindi Gheb	308,878						
Chakwal	768,622						
Choa Saidan Shah	167,537						
Kallar Kahar	196,449						
Dina	277,182						
Jhelum	507,788						
Pind Dadan Khan	371,971						
Sohawa	225,367						
Rawalpindi	3,744,590						
Gujar Khan	781,578	678,503					
Kahuta	237,843	220,576					
Kallar Syedan	242,709	217,273					
Taxila	739,244	677,951					
Daultala	...						
Kotli Sattian	120,421	119,312	81,524	83,255	...	...	...
Murree	252,526	233,471					
Depalpur	1,592,201						
Okara	1,393,746						
Renala Khurd	529,543						
Arifwala	999,278						
Pakpattan	1,136,892						
Chichawatni	1,155,978						
Sahiwal	1,725,833						
Khushab	816,682						
Noorpur Thal	264,597						
Quaidabad	274,959						
Naushera	144,851						
Bhalwal	387,262						
Bhera	384,403						
Kot Momin	544,208						
Sahiwal	407,487						
Sargodha	1,800,455						
Shahpur	424,746						
Sillanwali	385,887						
Bhakkar	809,789						
Darya Khan	421,309						
Kalurkot	415,708						
Mankera	310,664						
Isakhel	414,100						
Mianwali	908,405						
Piplan	475,763						
Talagang	457,635						
Lawa	144,611						
Multan Khurd	...						

== See also ==
- List of tehsils of Pakistan
  - Tehsils of Khyber Pakhtunkhwa, Pakistan
  - Tehsils of Balochistan, Pakistan
  - Tehsils of Sindh, Pakistan
  - Tehsils of Azad Kashmir
  - Tehsils of Gilgit-Baltistan
- Districts of Pakistan
  - Districts of Khyber Pakhtunkhwa, Pakistan
  - Districts of Punjab, Pakistan
  - Districts of Balochistan, Pakistan
  - Districts of Sindh, Pakistan
  - Districts of Azad Kashmir
  - Districts of Gilgit-Baltistan
