= Mayo Gardens =

Neighborhood in Lahore, Punjab, Pakistan

Coordinates: 31°33′N 74°21′E

Mayo Gardens میو باغ
- Locality
- Interactive map of Mayo Gardens میو باغ
- Country: Pakistan
- Province: Punjab
- City: Lahore
- Tehsil: Lahore City

Mayo Gardens (Punjabi, Urdu: میو باغ, Mayo Bagh) is a colonial residential colony under the administration of Pakistan Railways. It is located in Lahore City Tehsil of Lahore in Punjab, Pakistan.

== History ==
Originally the residential colony was constructed for officials of North Western State Railway during the British Raj and was populated primarily by families of British officers. Later, the neighbourhood was handed over to Pakistan Railways. Mayo Gardens spreads over 10 acres (40,000 m^{2}) and is located between Davis Road and Allama Iqbal Road, east of the Old City.
