= Faisal Bagh =

Coordinates: 31°38′N 74°16′E

Faisal Bagh فیصل باغ
- Union Council
- Interactive map of Faisal Bagh
- Country: Pakistan
- Province: Punjab
- City: Lahore
- Zone: Ravi
- Union council: UC 8

Government
  - Type: City Council
  - Chairperson: X

Faisal Bagh (Urdu: فیصل باغ, also known as Faisal Park) is a union council located in the Ravi Zone of Lahore, Punjab, Pakistan. The total population of Kot Begum is 69,758 and predominantly consists of unplanned settlement/infrastructure along the N-5 National Highway.

== Localities ==
- Haji Kot
- Ali Bagh (Ali Park)
- Javed Bagh (Javed Park)
- Jameel Bagh (Jameel Park)
- Barkat Town
