= Boharwala =

Village in Punjab, Pakistan

Bohar Wala
- Location within Pakistan
- Coordinates: 30.98°N 72.04°E
- Country: Pakistan
- Province: Punjab

Area
  - Total: 3 km^{2} (1.2 sq mi)
- Elevation: 89 m (292 ft)
- Highest elevation: 89 m (292 ft)
- Lowest elevation: 88 m (289 ft)

Population
  - Total: 600
  - Density: 200/km^{2} (520/sq mi)
- Time zone: UTC+5 (PST)
- Calling code: 0477

Boharwala (Urdu: بوھڑ والا) is a village in Jhang District, Ahmadpur Sial Tehsil, in the Punjab province of Pakistan. It is located near the River Chenab after the River Jhelum merges with this river. The village is in the center of Garh Maharaja, about 20 km from Athara Hazari and located on the Garh Maharaja-Athara Hazari Road in Jhang Sadar.
