= Umarpura Chak 50 R/B Tiwana =

Village in Shahkot tehsil, Punjab, Pakistan

Umerpura Chak No.50 R/B ਟਿਵਾਨਾ, ٹوانہ Tiwana is a village in Shahkot tehsil, Nankana Sahib District, Punjab, Pakistan. It is 1.5 kilometres (0.9 mi) from Shahkot on the road to Sangla Hill. It has a primary school and a girls' middle school.

== History of the village name ==
The first name of Tiwana village was Tibbi Qazian. Malik Umar Hayat Khan Tiwana was a general in the British Army, who was awarded the village.

Tiwana is a Punjabi caste that hails from the Punjab region of Pakistan and India. Tiwana is a Jat and Rajput clan. Tiwanas from India are Sikhs, while Tiwanas from Pakistan are Muslim Rajputs, such as Malik Umar Hayat Khan.
