= Sahibkay Cheema =

Pakistani village

Sahibkay Cheema is a village located in Sambrial Tehsil of Sialkot District in Punjab province of Pakistan. Sahibkay Cheema is situated on the bank of the Nullah Aik. The village has agricultural land.
