= Umarke =

Settlement in Pakistan

Coordinates: 32°25′N 74°20′E

Umarke is a small village in Sambrial Tehsil, Sialkot District, in Punjab, Pakistan. The village has a population of around 500. Before Sambarial became a tehsil, the village was administratively part of Daska Tehsil.
