= Gujranwala City Tehsil =

- Tehsil
- Country: Pakistan
- Region: (Punjab, Pakistan) Punjab
- District: Gujranwala

Area
  - Tehsil: 131 km^{2} (51 sq mi)

Population (2023)
  - Tehsil: 2,511,118
  - Density: 19,200/km^{2} (49,600/sq mi)
  - Urban: 2,511,118 (100%)
  - Rural: 0
- Time zone: UTC+5 (PST)
  - Summer (DST): UTC+6 (PDT)

Gujranwala City is a tehsil of Gujranwala District, Punjab, Pakistan. The population is 259,556 according to the 2017 Census of Pakistan.

== Demographics ==
=== Population ===
Historical population
Year	Pop.	±% p.a.
1951	...	—
1961	...	—
1972	...	—
1981	...	—
1998	...	—
2017	2,102,311	—
2023	2,511,118	+3.01%

As of the 2023 census, Gujranwala City Tehsil has a population of 2,511,118, with 1,290,348 males and 1,220,560 females. The city has experienced significant growth, with an average annual growth rate of 3.63% since 2017. The age distribution is as follows:

- 0-14 years: 960,383
- 15-64 years: 1,470,713
- 65+ years: 79,787

Gujranwala is known as the "City of Wrestlers" and is a significant industrial hub, contributing 5% to 9% of Pakistan's national GDP. The city also boasts a high literacy rate, with 87% literacy among the 15–24 age group.

== See also ==
- Tehsils of Pakistan
  - Tehsils of Punjab, Pakistan
  - Tehsils of Balochistan
  - Tehsils of Khyber Pakhtunkhwa
  - Tehsils of Sindh
  - Tehsils of Azad Kashmir
  - Tehsils of Gilgit-Baltistan
