= Jehanian =

Tehsil in Khanewal district, Pakistan

Jahanian جہانیاں
- Jahanian
- Location within Punjab, Pakistan Location within Pakistan
- Coordinates: 30°02′24″N 71°49′05″E
- Country: Pakistan
- Province: Punjab, Pakistan
- District: Khanewal

Population (2023 Census)
  - Total: 50,318
- Time zone: UTC+5 (PST)
- Calling code: 065

Jahanian (Urdu: جہانیاں, Punjabi: جہانیاں) is a city in Khanewal District, Punjab, Pakistan.

Jahanian city is the headquarter of Jahanian Tehsil, one of four sub-divisions of Khanewal district. Previously known as Jahanian Mandi, it is a small city surrounded by villages. Most of the area consists of agriculture land. It is 30 minutes drive from Dokota (28 km) and 45 minutes drive from Multan (42 km). The town is located at the crossroads of the Khanewal–Lodhran National Highway (N-5A), and the Multan–Delhi Grand Trunk Road. It is situated at 416 feet above sea level. Tehsil Jahanian is situated at a point where district Vehari, Khanewal, Lodhran and Multan adjoin as follows.

• North: District Khanewal

• West: District Multan

• South: District Lodhran

• East: District Vehari

== Demographics ==
Population

Historical population
Year	Pop.	±%
1972	12,421	—
1981	15,930	+28.3%
1998	24,871	+56.1%
2017	43,646	+75.5%
2023	50,318	+15.3%

According to official 2023 census results, the population of Jahanian city is 50,318.

== Transport ==
There is a railway station and a public bus stand. People rely mostly on public transport. As Jahanian is situated at the National Highway (N5-A) bypass, conveyance is available round the clock. From this bypass, passengers can go to Lahore, Islamabad, Faisalabad, Bahawalpur, Sadiqabad, Sukkur, Hyderabad and Karachi.

== Famous Places ==
Masjid Al Murtaza

Qasr-E-Saeed (Goraya House)

Lakhi Tibi

Old Sabzi Mandi Park

Sadar Bazar Jahanian

Station Waly Samosy

Mashallah juice center

Digital Communication Jahanian
