= Hasilpur =

Hasilpur حاصل پور
- City
- Hasilpur
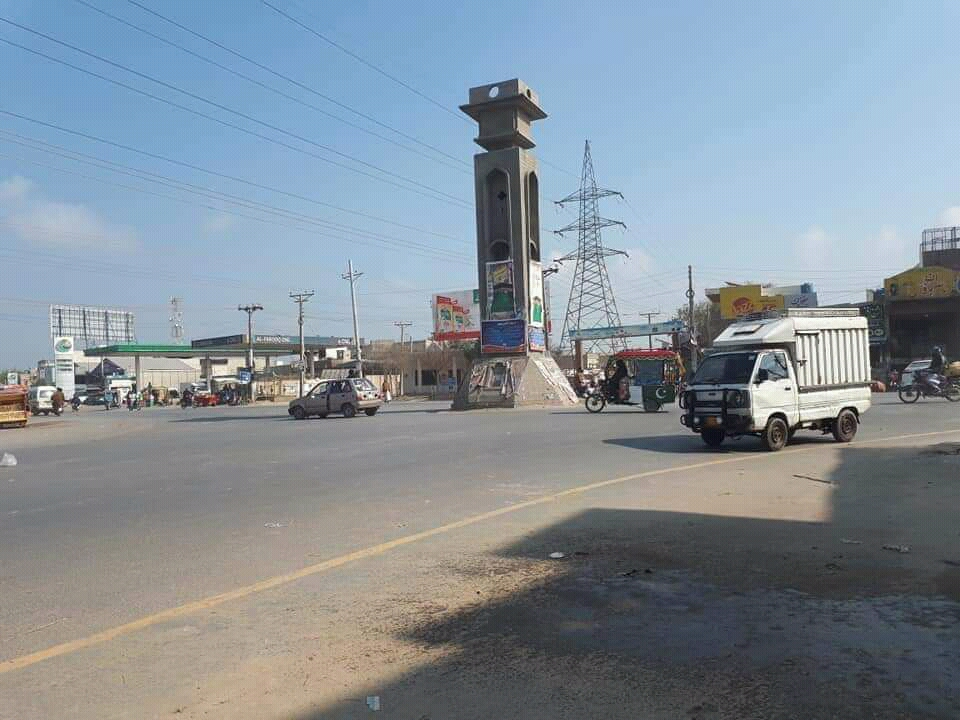
- Missile Chowk, Hasilpur

- Location in Pakistan Hasilpur (Pakistan)
- Coordinates: 29°41′30″N 72°32′43″E
- Country: Pakistan
- Province: Punjab
- District: Bahawalpur
- Settled: 1752
- Municipal Committee: 1976

Government
  - Type: Municipal Committee
  - Administrator: Hammad Hameed
  - Chief Officer: Nadeem Ahmed

Population (2023)
  - Total: 168,146
  - Rank: 66th, Pakistan
- Time zone: PST
- Post Code: 63000
- Area code: 062

Hasilpur (Punjabi and Urdu: حاصل پور), is a city in Hasilpur Tehsil of Bahawalpur District in Punjab, Pakistan. The city is located between the Satluj River and the Indian border and lies 96 km (60 mi) east of Bahawalpur.

== Demographics ==
Population

Historical population

Year	Pop.	±% p.a.
1951	3,490	—
1961	7,970	+8.61%
1972	15,742	+6.38%
1981	37,026	+9.97%

Year	Pop.	±% p.a.
1998	71,295	+3.93%
2017	115,536	+2.57%
2023	168,146	+6.45%

According to the 2023 census, Hasilpur has a population of 168,146.

Languages

Languages of Hasilpur MC (2023 Census)
1. Punjabi (70.1%)
2. Saraiki (22.1%)
3. Urdu (7.20%)
4. Other (0.60%)
