= Darbar Baba Nu Lakh Hazari =

Shrine of a Sufi in Punjab, Pakistan

Darbar Baba Nu Lakh Hazari is a Sufi shrine situated in the city of Shahkot in the Nankana Sahib District, in Punjab, Pakistan.

The shrine was built in the 12th century to honor Abu Alkhair Syed Murad Ali Shah Bukhari also known as Noulakha, who came to the Shahkot area in the 12th century to spread Islam in the subcontinent of India. "Nau lakh" is the Punjabi phrase for "nine hundred thousand". Noulakha received this name as it is believed by the people in the area that during his lifetime, he recited the Quran 900,000 times.

There is a hill near the shrine. Every year on 23 March, there is a gathering to celebrate the Urs (death anniversary) of Baba Nu Lakh Hazari.
