= Wahova =

Wahova وہوا
- Town
- Location in Pakistan Wahova (Pakistan)
- Coordinates: 31°7′58″N 70°30′46″E
- Country: Pakistan
- Province: Punjab
- District: Taunsa
- Tehsil: Wahova
- Elevation: 643 ft (196 m)
- Time zone: UTC+5 (PST)
  - Summer (DST): +6

Wahova, previously a town and now became Tehsil and Tehsil head Quarter in Taunsa District of Punjab, Pakistan. Largely inhabited by the Khetran tribe, it is also called Tuman Khetran. The main languages spoken here are Saraiki and Balochi. Located in northern part of the Taunsa District at 31°7'58N 70°30'46E, the tehsil has an elevation of 196 metres.
