= Naushera Tehsil =

Pakistani administrative area

Naushera Tehsil (Wadi-e-Soon) تحصیل نوشہرہ
- Tehsil
- Country: Pakistan
- Region: (Punjab, Pakistan) Punjab
- District: Khushab
- Capital: Naushera

Population (2023)
  - Total: 144,851
- Time zone: UTC+5 (PST)

Naushera Tehsil (Wadi-e-Soon), is a Tehsil (subdivision) of Khushab District in the Punjab province of Pakistan. Naushera city is the headquarter of tehsil.
