= Kamoke Tehsil =

Kamoke Tehsil تحصیل کامونکے تحصیل کاموں کی
- Tehsil
- Country: Pakistan
- Region: (Punjab, Pakistan) Punjab
- District: Gujranwala
- Headquarters: Kamoke

Area
  - Tehsil: 834 km^{2} (322 sq mi)

Population (2023)
  - Tehsil: 681,339
  - Density: 817/km^{2} (2,120/sq mi)
  - Urban: 292,023 (42.86%)
  - Rural: 389,316 (57.14%)
- Time zone: UTC+5 (PST)
  - Summer (DST): UTC+6 (PDT)

Kamoke is a Tehsil of Gujranwala district in Punjab, Pakistan. Located on the Grand Trunk Road, it is headquartered at Kamoke, which is approximately 24 km from Gujranwala - the district capital. Kamoke Tehsil is famous for its market of Basmati rice. It is administratively subdivided into twenty four union councils.

Kamoke is a bustling town located on the GT Road. Most inhabitants are Arain, Butt, Dar, Jat, Gujjar, Mughal, Momin Ansari, Rahmani Malik, Rajput, (Pathans are also influential) and depend on agriculture. It is famous for its rice and burfi (a local sweet). This area is attached to many villages and suburbs that are holding vast swathes of agricultural land. Almost all kind of vegetable are grown here as per the regional and climatic conditions. Rural vicinities are also well known for producing the dairy products that include milk, butter and other related products.

== Political Situation ==
In terms of political leadership, unfortunately however this region has not got any sincere representative who could truly think of the problems and difficulties faced by general masses. Culture of politics till date revolves around family politics and tribe loyalty instead of vision-based. Even in recent general elections of 2018, people preferred the same family and caste politics and elected the year old tested and in-effective political leadership. However, with the new government in the provincial assembly, there is chance of seeing a positive local bodies governing system.one of his famous village Bhopar.

== Demographics ==
=== Population ===
Historical population
Year	Pop.	±% p.a.
1951	...	—
1961	...	—
1972	...	—
1981	...	—
1998	...	—
2017	579,690	—
2023	681,339	+2.73%

According to the 2023 census, Kamoke Tehsil in Gujranwala District, Punjab, Pakistan, has a population of approximately 681,339, with 292,023 residing in urban areas and 389,316 in rural areas. The average annual growth rate from 2017 to 2023 is 2.71%, and the average household size is 6.88. The city of Kamoke, serving as the administrative center of the tehsil, has a population of 292,023 as of 2023. Renowned for its significant rice market and numerous mosques, Kamoke is strategically located on the Grand Trunk Road, approximately 21 km from Gujranwala and 44 km from Lahore. Overall, Kamoke Tehsil encompasses an area of 834 square kilometers, resulting in a population density of approximately 816.95 people per square kilometer.

== Union councils ==
here the names of the Union councils are as follows:

- Sadhoke
- Gunnaur
- Akbar Ghanoke
- Ghoman
- Ghaniaan
- Mari Thakran (Mustafa Abad)
- Mandiala Tega
- Chak Ramdas
- Bhopar
- Dhensar Paind
- Wahndo
- Sohawa
- Kali Suba
- Kotli Nawab
- Machhrala
- Nangal Doona Singh
- Kamoke Town Urban-I (Ahmad Raza Bajwa)
- Kamoke Town Urban-II
- Kamoke Town Urban-III
- Kamoke Town Urban-IV
- Kamoke Town Urban-V
- Kamoke Town Urban-VI
- Kamoke Town Urban-VII (Khan Town)
- Kamoke Town Urban-VIII

== See also ==
- Tehsils of Pakistan
  - Tehsils of Punjab, Pakistan
  - Tehsils of Balochistan
  - Tehsils of Khyber Pakhtunkhwa
  - Tehsils of Sindh
  - Tehsils of Azad Kashmir
  - Tehsils of Gilgit-Baltistan
