= De-Excluded Area Rajanpur Tehsil =

- Tehsil
- Country: Pakistan
- Region: (Punjab, Pakistan) Punjab
- District: Rajanpur

Area
  - Tehsil: 5,013 km^{2} (1,936 sq mi)

Population (2023)
  - Tehsil: 41,741
  - Density: 8.327/km^{2} (21.57/sq mi)
  - Urban: 0 (0.00%)
  - Rural: 41,741 (100%)

Literacy (2023)
  - Literacy rate: Total: (8.60%); Male: (12.36%); Female: (4.14%)
- Time zone: UTC+5 (PST)
  - Summer (DST): UTC+6 (PDT)

De-Excluded Area Rajanpur, also known as Rajanpur Tribal Area, is a tehsil located in Rajanpur District, Punjab, Pakistan. The population is 41,741 according to the 2023 census. 98.6% of tehsil's population is Balochi-speaking.

== Demographics ==
=== Population ===
Historical population
Year	Pop.	±% p.a.
1951	3,610	—
1961	6,968	+6.80%
1972	5,399	−2.29%
1981	21,492	+16.59%
1998	14,051	−2.47%
2017	34,191	+4.79%
2023	41,741	+3.38%

As of the 2023 census, De-Excluded Area Rajanpur tehsil had a population of 41,741. All of which lives in rural areas.

As of the 2023 census, De-Excluded Area Rajanpur Tehsil has a total literacy rate of 8.6%, with male literacy at 12.36% and female literacy at 4.14%.

== See also ==
- List of tehsils of Pakistan
  - List of tehsils of Punjab, Pakistan
