= Darya Khan =

Town in Punjab, Pakistan

Darya Khan درياخان
- City
- Location within Pakistan Location within Punjab, Pakistan
- Coordinates: 31°47′12″N 71°06′26″E
- Pakistan: Pakistan
- Province: Punjab
- Elevation: 1,487 m (4,879 ft)

Population (2023)
  - Total: 68,622
- Time zone: UTC+5 (PST)
- 30110: 30100
- Number of Union councils: 2
- Website: https://bhakkar.punjab.gov.pk/

Darya Khan (Urdu: درياخان) is a town in Bhakkar District in the Punjab Province of Pakistan.

The town is the headquarters of Darya Khan Tehsil. The town of Darya Khan is subdivided into two union councils. During British rule the railway station at Darya Khan was built as part of the North-Western Railway route. Darya Khan has a boys' secondary school, established by the British in 1928, and a college in the middle of the town. Darya Khan is situated to the west of the Indus River.

== Demographics ==
In 1972, the population of the town was 16,726; according to the 2023 Census of Pakistan, the population has risen to 68,622.

Census	Population
1972	16,726
1981	25,877
1998	41,785
2017	60,856
2023	68,622
