= Lahore District =

District in Punjab, Pakistan

Lahore District لہور ضلع (Punjabi) ضلع لاہور (Urdu)
- District of Punjab
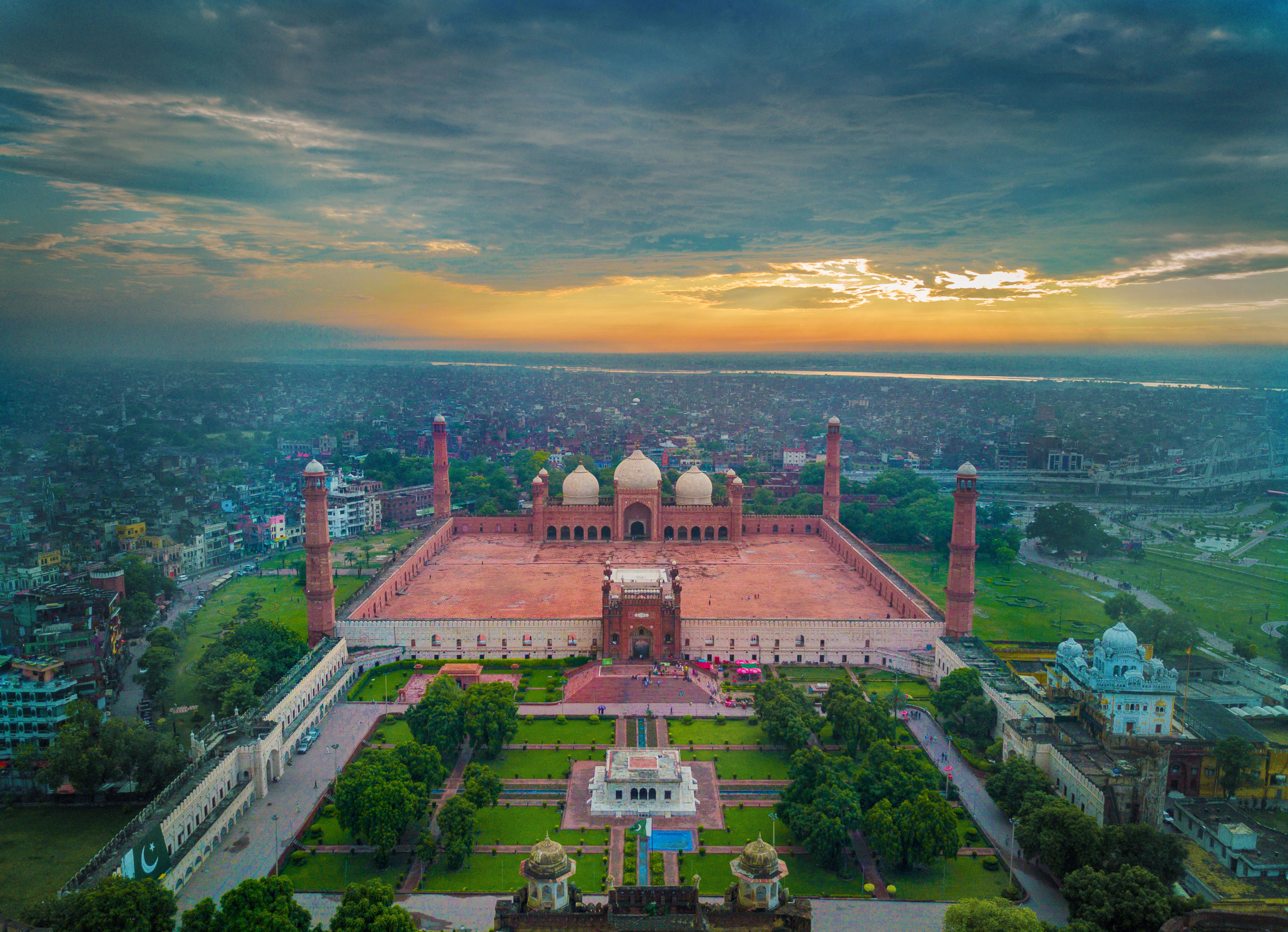
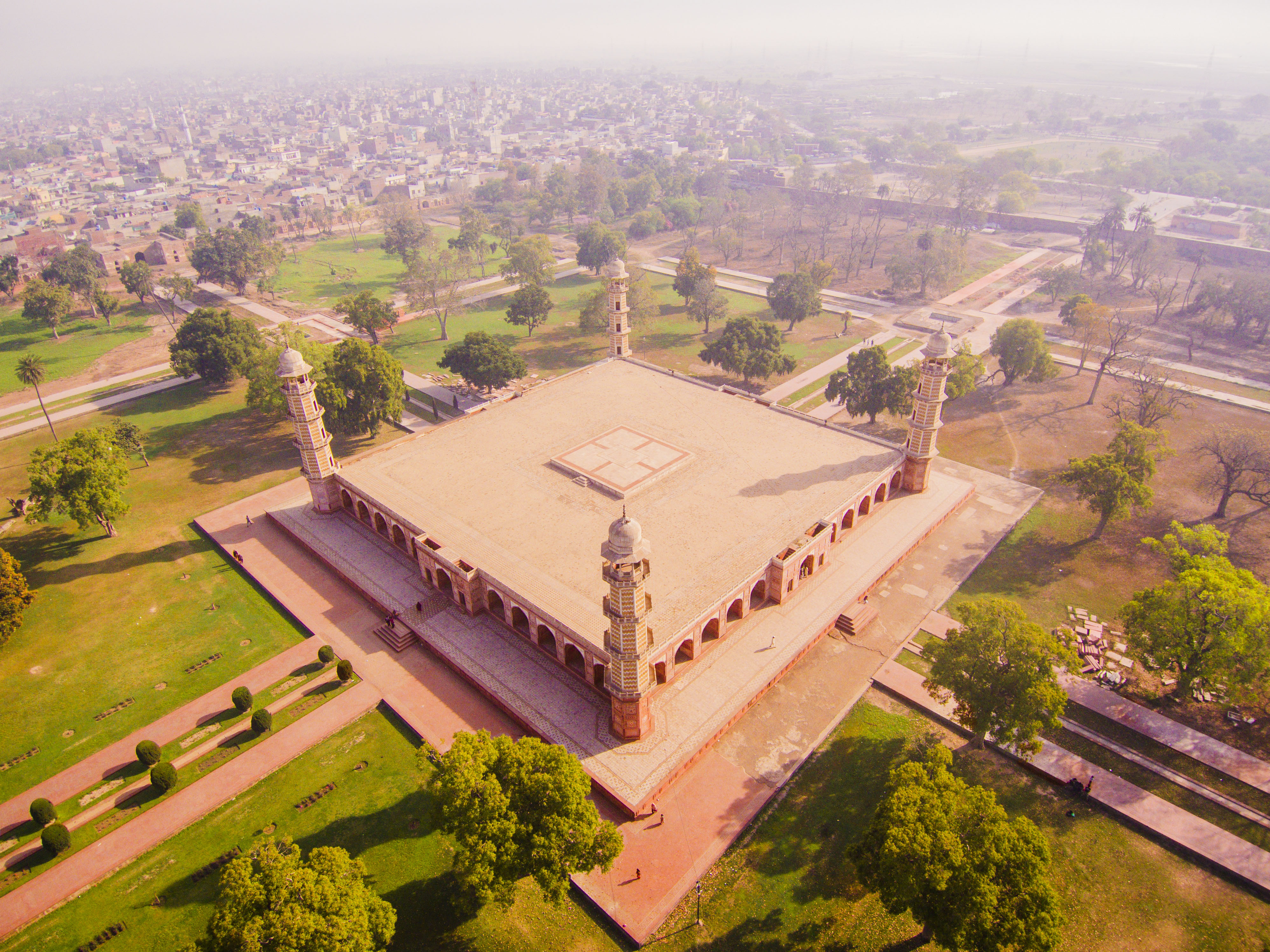
- Top: Badshahi Mosque; Bottom: Tomb of Jahangir

- Map of Lahore District highlighted within Punjab Province
- Coordinates: 31°25′N 74°20′E
- Country: Pakistan
- Province: (Punjab, Pakistan) Punjab
- Division: Lahore
- Established: 1849; 177 years ago
- Founder: British Raj
- Headquarters: Lahore
- Administrative Subdivisions: 05: Lahore Cantt Tehsil Lahore City Tehsil Model Town Tehsil Raiwind Tehsil Shalimar Tehsil

Government
  - Type: District Administration
  - District Commissioner: Syed Musa Raza
  - Constituensy (14): NA-117 Lahore-I to NA-130 Lahore-XIV

Area
  - Total: 1,772 km^{2} (684 sq mi)
- Elevation: 217 m (712 ft)

Population (2023)
  - Total: 12,978,661
  - Density: 7,324/km^{2} (18,970/sq mi)
- Demonym: Lahori

Literacy
  - Literacy rate: Total: (79.62%); Male: (81.41%); Female: (77.59%)
- Time zone: UTC+05:00 (PKT)
  - Summer (DST): DST is not observed
- ZIP Code: 54000
- NWD (area) code: 042
- ISO 3166 code: PK-PB
- CNIC Code of Lahore District: 3520X-XXXXXXX-X
- Website: lahore.punjab.gov.pk

Lahore District (Note: Punjabi: لہور ضلع; Urdu: ضلع لاہور) is a district within the Lahore Division of Punjab, Pakistan, consisting of the provincial capital of Lahore and surrounding areas. It is the most populous district of Pakistan, with a population of 12.9 million in 2023.

The total area is 1,772 square kilometres (684 sq mi). Before 1976, Lahore district was composed of 3 tehsils - Lahore, Kasur and Chunian, but in 1976, Kasur and Chunian tehsils became Kasur District, separate from Lahore District. The remaining area was then sub-divided into 5 tehsils - Lahore, Lahore Cantonment, Model Town, Raiwind and Shalimar.

On 27 August 2024, the Punjab Government announced the creation of five new tehsils - Wagah, Ravi, Nishtar, Iqbal Town and Saddar. Total number of its tehsils now stands at ten.

== Administration ==
The district is administratively subdivided into following ten tehsils.

Tehsil	Area (km^{2})	Pop. (2023)	Density (ppl/km^{2}) (2023)	Literacy rate (2023)	Union Councils
Lahore Cantt	466	1,439,784	4,045.27	81.01%	...
Lahore City	214	1,966,959	19,268.01	80.36%	69
Lahore Saddar	...	420,643	...	...	29
Iqbal	...	1,001,793	...	...	37
Model Town	353	2,272,306	9,192.37	78.94%	77
Nishtar	...	972,600	...	...	40
Raiwind	467	738,140	2,314.00	72.35%	32
Ravi	...	1,497,099	...	...	52
Shalimar	272	2,130,147	9,816.69	81.21%	72
Wagah	...	539,190	...	...	25

== History ==
Lahore district was annexed by the British from its former Sikh rulers after the Second Anglo-Sikh War of 1848–1849.

== Demography ==
=== Population ===
Historical population
Year	Pop.	±% p.a.
1951	1,134,757	—
1961	1,625,810	+3.66%
1972	2,587,621	+4.32%
1981	3,544,942	+3.56%
1998	6,318,745	+3.46%
2017	11,119,985	+3.02%
2023	13,004,135	+2.64%

As of the 2023 census, Lahore district has 2,010,225 households and a population of 13,004,135. The district has a sex ratio of 112.47 males to 100 females and a literacy rate of 79.62%: 81.41% for males and 77.59% for females. 3,231,990 (24.9% of the surveyed population) are under 10 years of age. The entire population lives in urban areas.

=== Religion ===
Religion in Lahore district (2023)
Religion	Percent
Islam	95.26%
Christianity	4.64%
Other or not stated	0.1%

Religion in contemporary Lahore District
Religious group	1941		2017		2023	
Religious group	Pop.	%	Pop.	%	Pop.	%
Islam	552,907	62.12%	10,530,816	94.7%	12,363,149	95.26%
Hinduism	193,714	21.77%	2,670	0.02%	2,811	0.02%
Sikhism	103,312	11.61%	—N/a	—N/a	324	0%
Christianity	37,442	4.21%	571,365	5.14%	602,431	4.64%
Ahmadiyya	—N/a	—N/a	13,433	0.12%	7,139	0.06%
Zoroastrianism	—N/a	—N/a	—N/a	—N/a	77	0%
Others	3,553	0.4%	1,701	0.02%	2,339	0.02%
Total Population	890,928	100%	11,119,985	100%	12,978,661	100%
Note: 1941 census data is for Lahore tehsil of erstwhile Lahore district, which roughly corresponds to contemporary Lahore district. District and tehsil borders have changed since 1941.

Religious groups in Lahore District (British Punjab province era)
Religious group	1881		1891		1901		1911		1921		1931		1941	
Religious group	Pop.	%	Pop.	%	Pop.	%	Pop.	%	Pop.	%	Pop.	%	Pop.	%
Islam	599,477	64.87%	645,083	59.99%	717,519	61.74%	626,271	60.44%	647,640	57.25%	815,820	59.18%	1,027,772	60.62%
Hinduism (Note: 1931-1941: Including Ad-Dharmis)	193,319	20.92%	271,749	25.27%	276,375	23.78%	217,609	21%	255,690	22.6%	259,725	18.84%	284,689	16.79%
Sikhism	125,591	13.59%	152,023	14.14%	159,701	13.74%	169,008	16.31%	179,975	15.91%	244,304	17.72%	310,646	18.32%
Christianity	4,644	0.5%	5,483	0.51%	7,296	0.63%	21,781	2.1%	46,454	4.11%	57,097	4.14%	67,686	4.14%
Jainism	970	0.1%	886	0.08%	1,047	0.09%	1,139	0.11%	1,209	0.11%	1,450	0.11%	1,951	0.12%
Zoroastrianism	92	0.01%	132	0.01%	171	0.01%	209	0.02%	179	0.02%	159	0.01%	136	0.01%
Buddhism	0	0%	0	0%	0	0%	128	0.01%	170	0.02%	14	0%	32	0%
Judaism	—N/a	—N/a	14	0%	0	0%	13	0%	13	0%	1	0%	2	0%
Others	13	0%	9	0%	0	0%	0	0%	6	0%	0	0%	0	0%
Total population	924,106	100%	1,075,379	100%	1,162,109	100%	1,036,158	100%	1,131,336	100%	1,378,570	100%	1,695,375	100%
Note: British Punjab province era district borders are not an exact match in the present-day due to various bifurcations to district borders — which since created new districts — throughout the historic Punjab Province region during the post-independence era that have taken into account population increases.

Religion in the Tehsils of Lahore District (1921)
Tehsil	Islam		Hinduism		Sikhism		Christianity		Jainism		Others (Note: Including Buddhism, Zoroastrianism, Judaism, Tribals, others, or not stated)		Total	
Tehsil	Pop.	%	Pop.	%	Pop.	%	Pop.	%	Pop.	%	Pop.	%	Pop.	%
Lahore Tehsil	290,325	56.31%	139,215	27%	57,337	11.12%	27,898	5.41%	478	0.09%	360	0.07%	515,613	100%
Chunian Tehsil	179,399	60.71%	61,475	20.8%	49,151	16.63%	5,408	1.83%	76	0.03%	0	0%	295,509	100%
Kasur Tehsil	177,916	55.56%	55,000	17.18%	73,487	22.95%	13,154	4.11%	655	0.2%	2	0%	320,214	100%
Note: British Punjab province era tehsil borders are not an exact match in the present-day due to various bifurcations to tehsil borders — which since created new tehsils — throughout the historic Punjab Province region during the post-independence era that have taken into account population increases.

Religion in the Tehsils of Lahore District (1941)
Tehsil	Islam		Hinduism		Sikhism		Christianity		Jainism		Others (Note: Including Anglo-Indian Christians, British Christians, Buddhism, Zoroastrianism, Judaism, Tribals, others, or not stated)		Total	
Tehsil	Pop.	%	Pop.	%	Pop.	%	Pop.	%	Pop.	%	Pop.	%	Pop.	%
Lahore Tehsil	552,907	62.12%	193,714	21.77%	103,312	11.61%	37,442	4.21%	1,095	0.12%	2,458	0.28%	890,924	100%
Chunian Tehsil	237,829	60.85%	56,293	14.4%	83,888	21.46%	11,730	3%	47	0.01%	165	0.04%	389,952	100%
Kasur Tehsil	237,036	57.19%	34,682	8.37%	123,446	29.78%	18,514	4.47%	809	0.2%	8	0%	414,499	100%
Note1: British Punjab province era tehsil borders are not an exact match in the present-day due to various bifurcations to tehsil borders — which since created new tehsils — throughout the historic Punjab Province region during the post-independence era that have taken into account population increases. Note2: Tehsil religious breakdown figures for Christianity only includes local Christians, labeled as "Indian Christians" on census. Does not include Anglo-Indian Christians or British Christians, who were classified under "Other" category.

=== Language ===
Languages of Lahore district (2023)
1. Punjabi (73.6%)
2. Urdu (21.1%)
3. Pashto (2.06%)
4. Mewati (2.01%)
5. Saraiki (0.49%)
6. Others (1.22%)

At the time of the 2023 census, 73.58% of the population spoke Punjabi, 21.13% Urdu, 2.06% Pashto, 2.01% Mewati, 0.49% Saraiki, and 0.25% Hindko as their first language.

== Education ==
According to Pakistan District Education Rankings, a report by Alif Ailaan, Lahore is ranked nationally at 32 with a score of 69.2 and learning score of 53.93. Lahore ranks nationally at number 1 in terms of readiness score, with a score of 93.51. According to PEC assessments, Lahore ranks last out of all districts of Punjab in both class 5 and class 8.

Science labs in schools are either not available or have inadequate instruments which also affects quality. The school infrastructure score of Lahore is 91.32, ranking it 29th nationally. Still few schools in a major district like Lahore have open air or dangerous classrooms.

Issues mainly reported in TaleemDo! app from Lahore are that students want to study in private schools, as they are better than government schools but can not afford the fee. A communication gap between the teachers and the students was also reported and a few reported some facilities problems in their school.

== See also ==
- Punjab
- Districts of Pakistan
- List of districts of Punjab, Pakistan
