= Multan Tehsil =

Pakistani administrative area

Multan City Tehsil تحصیل ملتان شہر
- Tehsil
- Interactive map of Multan City Tehsil
- Country: Pakistan
- Region: (Punjab, Pakistan) Punjab
- District: Multan
- Capital: Multan

Population (2023)
  - Total: 2,555,486
- Time zone: UTC+5 (PST)

Multan City Tehsil (Urdu & Punjabi: تحصیل ملتان شہر), is a Tehsil (subdivision) of Multan District in the Punjab province of Pakistan. Multan city is the headquarter of tehsil.
