= Mandi Shah Jeewna =

Town in Punjab, Pakistan

- Town
- Location within Pakistan
- Coordinates: 31°34′10″N 72°17′33″E
- Country: Pakistan
- Province: Punjab
- District: Jhang
- Time zone: UTC+5 (PST)

Mandi Shah Jeewna is a town in the Jhang Tehsil, Jhang District, Punjab, Pakistan, about 33 km north of Jhang. It is near Shah Jeewna and has a railway station and its own markets.

== Notable people ==
- Faisal Saleh Hayat, a former interior minister and member National Assembly of Pakistan, is from this town.
