= Taxila Tehsil =

Administrative subdivision in Rawalpindi District, Pakistan

Taxila Tehsil تحصیل ٹیکسلا
- Tehsil
- Country: Pakistan
- Region: Punjab
- District: Rawalpindi District
- Capital: Taxila
- Union councils: 10

Population (2023 Pakistani census)
  - Total: 739,244
- Time zone: UTC+5 (PST)

The Taxila Tehsil, with its administrative centre in Taxila, is one of the eight sub-districts of the Rawalpindi District in the province of Punjab, Pakistan. It is neighboured by the Attock District to the west, Rawalpindi Tehsil to the south, the Islamabad Capital Territory to the east, and Haripur District to the north-east.

The area was part of the ancient Gandhara region, whose archaeological ruins, located in the modern town of Taxila, were designated a UNESCO World Heritage Site in 1980.

Union Councils of Taxila Tehsil.

== Demographics ==
As per the 2023 Pakistani census, the tehsil has a population of 739,244.

== Administration ==
The Taxila area is divided into ten union councils.

- Ghari Sikander
- Khurram Paracha
- Lab Thatoo
- Taxila Urban (3 Unions)
- Thatha Khalil
- Usman Khattar
- Wah
- Garhi Afghanan
