= Kunjah Tehsil =

Administrative subdivision in Punjab, Pakistan

Kunjah Tehsil Tehsil تحصِيل کنجاہ
- Tehsil
- Country: Pakistan
- Region: (Punjab, Pakistan) Punjab
- Division: Gujrat
- District: Gujrat
- Capital: Kunjah
- Time zone: UTC+5 (PST)

Kunjah Tehsil (Punjabi, Urdu: تحصیل کنجاہ) is a Tehsil (subdivision) of Gujrat District in the Punjab province of Pakistan. Kunjah city is the headquarter of this tehsil.
