= Lahore City Tehsil =

Tehsil in Punjab, Pakistan

Lahore City Tehsil تحصیل لاہور سِٹی
- Tehsil
- Country: Pakistan
- Province: Punjab
- District: Lahore
- Capital: Lahore

Population (2023)
  - Total: 4,123,354
- Time zone: UTC+5 (PST)

Lahore City Tehsil (Punjabi, Urdu: تحصیل لاہور سِٹی), is a Tehsil (subdivision) of Lahore District in the Punjab province of Pakistan. Lahore city is the headquarter of tehsil.
