= Raiwind Tehsil =

Tehsil administrative division in Lahore District, Pakistan

Raiwand Tehsil تحصیل رائے ونڈ
- Tehsil
- Country: Pakistan
- Province: (Punjab, Pakistan) Punjab
- District: Lahore

Population (2017 Census of Pakistan)
  - Total: 855,626
- Time zone: UTC+5 (PST)
  - Summer (DST): UTC+6 (PDT)

Raiwind (Punjabi, Urdu: تحصیل رائے وِنڈ) is a tehsil, an administrative subdivision, located in Lahore District, Punjab, Pakistan. Its population is 855,626 according to the 2017 census.

== Settlements ==
- Raiwind
