= Sahiwal Tehsil =

Pakistani administrative area

Sahiwal Tehsil تحصیل ساہیوال
- Tehsil
- Country: Pakistan
- Province: Punjab
- District: Sahiwal

Area
  - Tehsil: 1,610 km^{2} (620 sq mi)

Population (2023)
  - Tehsil: 1,725,833
  - Density: 1,070/km^{2} (2,780/sq mi)
  - Urban: 645,440 (34.44%)
  - Rural: 1,080,393 (65.56%)

Literacy
  - Literacy rate: Total: (64.44%); Male: (70.57%); Female: (58.07%)
- Time zone: UTC+5 (PST)

Sahiwal Tehsil is one of the two administrative sub-divisions (tehsils) of Sahiwal District, Punjab, Pakistan. Its capital city is Sahiwal.

Chichawatni is the other tehsil of the district.
