= Wahova Tehsil =

Pakistani admionistrative area

Wahova Tehsil تحصیل وہوا
- Tehsil
- Country: Pakistan
- Region: (Punjab, Pakistan) Punjab
- District: Taunsa
- Capital: Wahova
- Time zone: UTC+5 (PST)

Wahova Tehsil (Urdu & Punjabi: تحصیل وہوا), is a Tehsil (subdivision) of Taunsa District in the Punjab province of Pakistan. Wahova city is the headquarter of tehsil.
