= Ravi Tehsil =

Administrative division in Lahore, Pakistan

Coordinates: 31°37′N 74°18′E

Ravi Tehsil تحصیل راوی
- Tehsil
- Location within Pakistan
- Country: Pakistan
- Province: Punjab
- District: Lahore

Ravi (Punjabi, Urdu: تحصیل راوی) is a tehsil in Lahore, Punjab, Pakistan.

It forms one of 10 tehsils of the Lahore and is named after the Ravi River.
