= Sambrial Tehsil =

Sambrial Tehsil تحصیل سمبڑیال
- Tehsil
- Tehsil Municipal Administration logo
- Interactive map of Sambrial Tehsil
- Country: Pakistan
- Region: (Punjab, Pakistan) Punjab
- District: Sialkot
- Capital: Sambrial

Area
  - Tehsil: 450 km^{2} (170 sq mi)

Population (2023)
  - Tehsil: 460,280
  - Density: 1,000/km^{2} (2,600/sq mi)
  - Urban: 141,907 (30.83%)
  - Rural: 318,373 (69.17%)
- Time zone: UTC+5 (PST)
  - Summer (DST): PDT

Sambrial (Urdu: تحصیل سمبڑیال), is a tehsil of Sialkot District, in Punjab, Pakistan. It is a newly created subdivision; the city of Sambrial is the tehsil capital.

== Demographics ==
=== Population ===
Historical population
Year	Pop.	±% p.a.
1951	...	—
1961	...	—
1972	...	—
1981	...	—
1998	298,431	—
2017	410,823	+1.70%
2023	460,280	+1.91%

As of the 2023 census, Sambrial Tehsil in Sialkot District, Punjab, Pakistan, has a population of approximately 460,280. The urban population of Sambrial city is 119,571, comprising 60,830 males and 58,701 females. Sambrial Tehsil encompasses 160 villages, organized into 17 union councils. The tehsil has experienced significant growth, with an average annual growth rate of 1.49% between 2017 and 2023. The literacy rate in Sambrial Tehsil is 79.89%, reflecting a strong emphasis on education in the region.

== See also ==
- Tehsils of Pakistan
  - Tehsils of Punjab, Pakistan
  - Tehsils of Balochistan
  - Tehsils of Khyber Pakhtunkhwa
  - Tehsils of Sindh
  - Tehsils of Azad Kashmir
  - Tehsils of Gilgit-Baltistan
