= Faisalabad Sadar Tehsil =

Faisalabad Sadar Tehsil تحصیل فیصل آباد صدر
- Tehsil
- Country: Pakistan
- Province: (Punjab, Pakistan) Punjab
- Division: Faisalabad
- District: Faisalabad

Population (2017)
  - Tehsil: 1,465,411
  - Urban: 39,917
  - Rural: 1,425,494
- Time zone: UTC+5 (PST)

Faisalabad Sadar is a Tehsil of Faisalabad District, Punjab, Pakistan. The population is 1,465,411, according to the 2017 Census of Pakistan. Of the total population, 96% are Muslims and 3.99% Christians.
