= Muhammadpur Diwan =

Coordinates: 29°28′N 70°31′E

Muhammadpur Diwan محمد پور دیوان
- Town
- Interactive map of Muhammadpur Diwan
- Country: Pakistan
- Province: (Punjab, Pakistan) Punjab
- Division: Dera Ghazi Khan
- District: Rajanpur

Population
  - Total: 30,000
- Time zone: UTC+5 (PST)

Muhammadpur Diwan is a town in Rajanpur District in Punjab, Pakistan. It is situated 20 km from Jampur and 46 km from Rajanpur on the Indus Highway.

Muhammadpur (Urdu: تحصِيل محمد پُور), is a tehsil located in Punjab, Pakistan. Its one of the tehsil of newest district Jampur. It is administratively subdivided into 13 Union Councils, two of which form the tehsil capital Muhammadpur.
