= Multan Khurd =

Coordinates: 33°02′N 72°01′E

- union council
- Interactive map of Multan Khurd
- Country: Pakistan
- Province: Punjab
- Division: Rawalpindi Division
- District: Talagang
- Established: 2025

Government
  - Tehsildar: N/A
- Time zone: UTC+5 (PST)
- Postal code: 48030
- Area code: 0543/

Multan Khurd (Punjabi, Urdu: ملتان خورد) is one of union council of Talagang District in the Punjab province, Pakistan.
