= Jahanian Tehsil =

Jahanian Tehsil تحصِيل جہانياں
- Tehsil
- Interactive map of Jahanian Tehsil
- Coordinates: 30°2′30″N 71°48′40″E
- Country: Pakistan
- Region: (Punjab, Pakistan) Punjab
- Division: Khanewal
- District: Jahanian
- Towns: 1
- Union councils: 18

Government
  - Assistant Commissioner: Muneeba Qureshi

Population (2017)
  - Tehsil: 343,361
  - Urban: 43,598
  - Rural: 299,763
- Time zone: UTC+5 (PST)
- Postal code: 58200

Jahanian (Urdu: تحصِیل جہانیاں, Punjabi: تحصِيل جہانياں) is a tehsil, or administrative subdivision, of Khanewal District in the Punjab province of Pakistan. The city of Jahanian is the headquarters of the tehsil.

The languages spoken in the tehsil are Urdu, Punjabi, Saraiki, Mewati, and Haryanvi.
