= Darya Khan Tehsil =

Darya Khan Tehsil تحصِيل درياخان
- Tehsil
- Location in Punjab Location in Pakistan
- Coordinates: 31°46′50.1″N 71°06′29.2″E
- Country: Pakistan
- Region: Punjab
- District: Bhakkar District
- Capital: Darya Khan
- Towns: 1
- Union councils: 8

Population (2017 Census)
  - Total: 360,427
- Time zone: UTC+5 (PST)
- Postal code: 30100
- Website: Darya Khan

Darya Khan (Urdu: تحصِيل درياخان) is an administrative subdivision (tehsil) of Bhakkar District in the Punjab province of Pakistan. The headquarters of the tehsil is the town of Darya Khan, which is itself subdivided into two union councils.

At the 2017 Census, the tehsil's population was 360,427, compared to 233,410 at the 1998 census.
