= Khanewal Tehsil =

Khanewal Tehsil تحصِيل خانيوال
- Tehsil
- Country: Pakistan
- Region: (Punjab, Pakistan) Punjab
- District: Khanewal
- Capital: Khanewal
- Towns: 1
- Union councils: 25

Population (2017)
  - Tehsil: 856,793
  - Urban: 248,248
  - Rural: 608,545
- Time zone: UTC+5 (PST)
  - Summer (DST): UTC+5 (PDT)

Khanewal (Urdu: تحصِيل خانيوال) is a subdivision (tehsil) of Khanewal District in the Punjab province of Pakistan. It is administratively subdivided into 25 Union Councils, six of which form the city of Khanewal, which serves as the tehsil capital.

== Administration ==
The tehsil of Khanewal is administratively subdivided into 25 Union Councils. These are:

- Pirrowal
- Chak No. 14 Batian Wala
- Chak No. 12/AH
- Chak No. 171/10-R
- Chak No. 67.10R Batian Wala
- Chak No. 18.AH
- Chak No. 4/AH
- Chak No. 30/10.R
- Chak No. 36/10.R
- Chak No. 43/10-R
- Chak No. 58/10-R (Chak Shahana)
- Chak No. 70/10-R
- Chak No. 76/10-R
- Chak No. 80/10-R
- Chak No. 81-82/10-R
- Chak No. 88/10-R
- Chak No. 92/10-R
- Khanewal Kohna
- Khanewal-I
- Khanewal-II
- Khanewal-III
- Khanewal-IV
- Khanewal-V
- Khanewal-VI
- Chak No. 34/10-R
- Chak No. 7/v (Basti Sukhera)

== Language ==
Saraiki is the predominant language. Haryanvi, Punjabi and Urdu are also widely spoken in the tehsil.
