= Jalalpur Jattan Tehsil =

Administrative unit in Gujrat, Punjab, Pakistan

Jalalpur Jattan Tehsil تحصیل جلال پور جٹاں
- Tehsil
- Country: Pakistan
- Region: Punjab
- Division: Gujrat
- District: Gujrat
- Towns: 4

Area
  - Total: 708 km^{2} (273 sq mi)
- Time zone: UTC+5 (PST)

Jalalpur Jattan Tehsil is a subdivision (tehsil) of Gujrat District in the Punjab province of Pakistan.

On 20 November 2016, Jalalpur Jattan was notified as Tehsil by Punjab Chief Minister Shahbaz Shareef. Another Chief Minister, Pervaiz Elahi, approved Jalalpur Jattan as Tehsil on 19 Oct 2022 and it was notified on 1st November 2022.

The population of the tehsil is around 343,834, according to the 1998 census. The total area of the tehsil is around 175,030 acres covering at least 325 revenue estates (villages) and 77 Patwar circles.

== Area politicians ==
- Moin Nawaz Warraich, (Jalalpur Jattan Tehsil), Member Provincial Assembly of Punjab (2013-2018)
