= Faisalabad City Tehsil =

Faisalabad City Tehsil تحصیل فیصل آباد شہر
- Tehsil
- Country: Pakistan
- Province: (Punjab, Pakistan) Punjab
- Division: Faisalabad
- District: Faisalabad

Population (2017)
  - Tehsil: 3,238,841
  - Urban: 3,204,726
  - Rural: 34,115
- Time zone: UTC+5 (PST)

Faisalabad City is a Tehsil of Faisalabad District, Punjab, Pakistan. The population is 3,238,841 according to the 2017 Census of Pakistan.
