= Hafizabad Tehsil =

Tehsil subdivision in Hafizabad District, Punjab, Pakistan

Hafizabad Tehsil تحصِيل حافظ آباد
- Tehsil
- Country: Pakistan
- Province: (Punjab, Pakistan) Punjab
- District: Hafizabad
- Headquarters: Hafizabad

Population (2017)
  - Tehsil: 663,735
  - Urban: 263,955
  - Rural: 399,780

Hafizabad Tehsil (Urdu: تحصِيل حافظ آباد) is a tehsil of Hafizabad District in Punjab, Pakistan.
