= Hasilpur Tehsil =

Hasilpur Tehsil تحصیل حاصل پور
- Tehsil
- Location of Hasilpur Tehsil in Punjab, Pakistan
- Country: Pakistan
- Region: (Punjab, Pakistan) Punjab
- District: Bahawalpur
- Capital: Hasilpur
- Towns: 1
- Union councils: 15

Area
  - Tehsil: 1,490 km^{2} (580 sq mi)

Population (2023)
  - Tehsil: 506,604
  - Density: 340/km^{2} (881/sq mi)
  - Urban: 195,683 (38.62%)
  - Rural: 310,921 (61.38%)

Literacy
  - Literacy rate (2023): 59.64%
- Time zone: UTC+5 (PST)

Hasilpur Tehsil (Urdu: تحصیل حاصل پور) is an administrative subdivision (tehsil) of Bahawalpur District in the Punjab province of Pakistan. The city of Hasilpur is the headquarters of the tehsil which is administratively subdivided into 15 Union Councils.

== Administration ==
The Union Councils of Tehsil Hasilpur are:

Sr. No.	Name of Union Council	Total Population
1.	Hasilpur Old (UC # 37)	20490
2.	Hasilpur Mandi (UC # 38)	26903
3.	Hazrat Rangeela Shah (UC # 39)	22264
4.	Jamalpur (UC # 40)	22970
5.	Shahpur (UC # 41)	22441
6.	Qaimpur (UC # 42)	23792
7.	Pallah (UC # 43)	23230
8.	Hasilpur Old (UC # 44)	20043
9.	Chak No. 58/F (UC # 45)	18455
10.	Chak No. 79/F (UC # 46)	21452
11.	Chak No. 89 (UC # 47)	22714
12.	Choona Wala (UC # 48)	26000
13.	Chak No. 192/M (UC # 49)	18717
14.	Chak No. 153/M (UC # 28)	26401

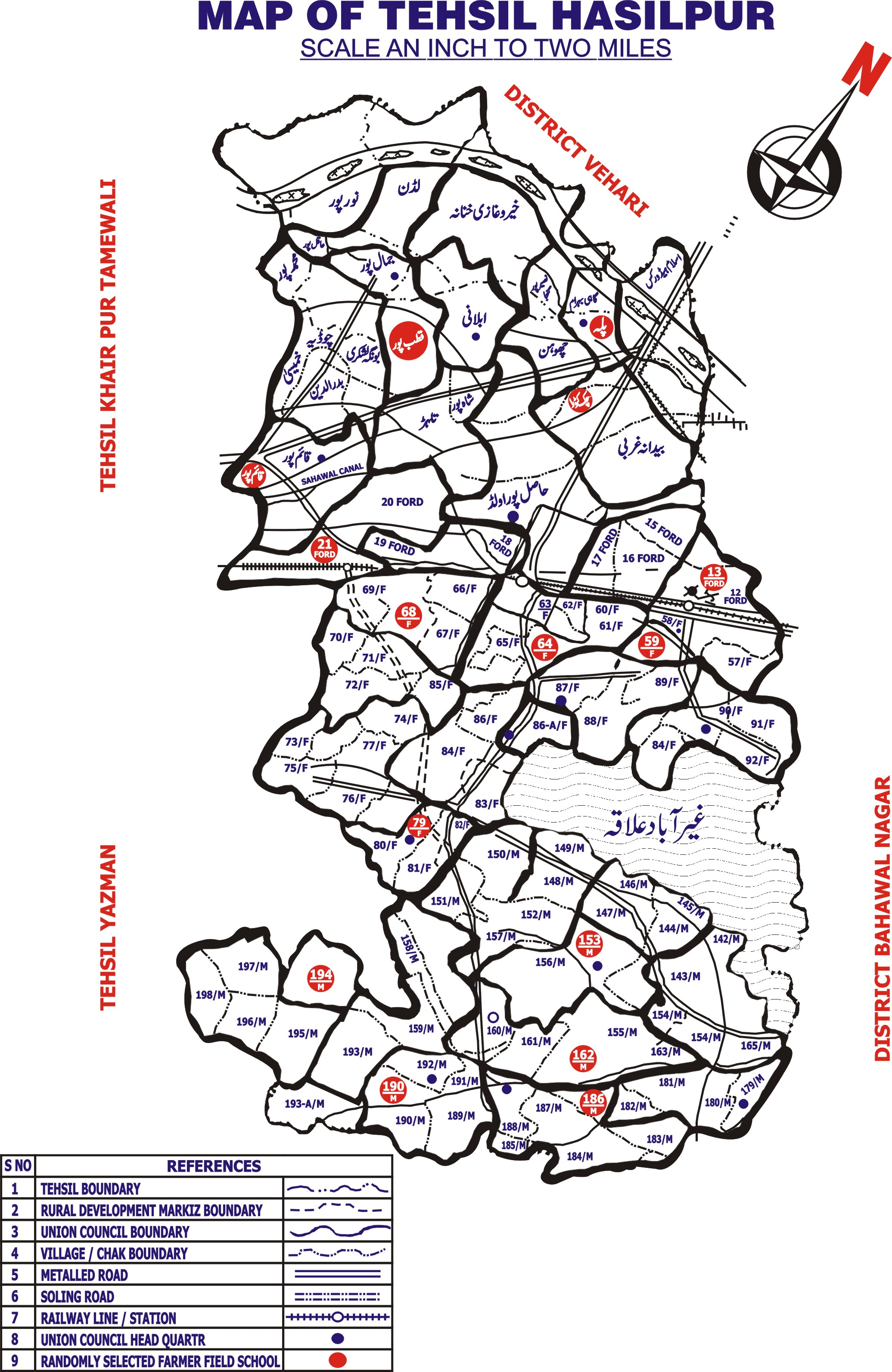
Map of Haislpur Tehsil

== Demographics ==
=== Population ===
Historical population
Year	Pop.	±% p.a.
1951	76,566	—
1961	107,348	+3.44%
1972	139,464	+2.41%
1981	197,397	+3.94%
1998	317,513	+2.84%
2017	456,006	+1.92%
2023	506,604	+1.77%

According to the 2023 census, the Hasilpur Tehsil population was 506,604, up from 456,006 in 2017 and 317,513 in 1998.

=== Languages ===
Languages of Yazman Tehsil (2023)
1. Punjabi (57.0%)
2. Saraiki (38.8%)
3. Urdu (3.10%)
4. Others (1.10%)

The major languages spoken in Hasilpur Tehsil are Punjabi, Saraiki, Riasti and Urdu.
