= Athara Hazari Tehsil =

Subdivision of Jhang, Punjab, Pakistan

Athara Hazari Tehsil تحصِيل اٹهاره ہزارى
- Tehsil
- Interactive map of Athara Hazari Tehsil
- Coordinates: 30°34′55.65″N 71°32′9.97″E
- Country: Pakistan
- Region: Punjab
- District: Jhang
- Capital: Athara Hazari
- Union councils: 13

Population (2017)
  - Tehsil: 295,801
  - Urban: 27,561
  - Rural: 268,240
- Time zone: UTC+5 (PST)
  - Summer (DST): UTC+6 (PDT)

Athara Hazari (Urdu: تحصِيل اٹهاره ہزارى) is an administrative sub-division (Tehsil) of the Jhang District, Punjab, Pakistan. Athara Hazari is home to the shrine of Pir Taj Din, who came from Kot Crore to Mouza Maghiana (Jhang) for sightseeing. When he came to the river Jhelum, he saw the apathy of the Muslim population towards Islam. He took up residence here and popularized Islam.There locality chah bahadar wala village near it.

The tehsil is spread over 3,86,065 acres, constituting 25 percent area of Jhang District.
