= Jhang Tehsil =

Jhang Tehsil تحصيل جھنگ
- Tehsil
- Country: Pakistan
- Region: (Punjab, Pakistan) Punjab
- District: Jhang
- Capital: Jhang
- Union councils: 55

Population (2017)
  - Tehsil: 1,466,141
  - Urban: 429,363
  - Rural: 1,036,878
- Time zone: UTC+5 (PST)
  - Summer (DST): UTC+6 (PDT)

Jhang (Urdu: تحصِل جهنگ), (Gurmukhi: ਝੰਗ) is a subdivision (Tehsil) of Jhang District in the Punjab province of Pakistan. It is subdivided into 55 Union Councils.

The city of Jhang is the headquarters of the tehsil.
