= Shahkot, Pakistan =

Shahkot شاہ کوٹ
- City
- Location within Punjab, Pakistan Location within Pakistan
- Coordinates: 31°34′24″N 73°28′50″E
- Country: Pakistan
- Province: Punjab
- District: Nankana Sahib
- Established: 1960
- Founder: Syed Murad Ali Shah

Government
  - Type: Municipal Committee
  - Chairman: None (Vacant)
  - Vice-Chairman: None (Vacant)

Population (2023)
  - City: 89,638
  - Rank: 144th in Pakistan
- Time zone: UTC+5 (PST)
- Postal code: 39630

Shahkot (Punjabi, Urdu: شاہ کوٹ) is a city and one of three tehsils in the Nankana Sahib District of Punjab, Pakistan. It is one the oldest towns of Pakistan.

A hill park in the town is being converted into a theme park. A Sufi shrine, Darbar Baba Nu Lakh Hazari, draws large crowds at the sufi's Urs (death anniversary) on 23 March every year.

== Demographics ==
Historical population
Year	Pop.	±%
1972	17,515	—
1981	24,012	+37.1%
1998	39,263	+63.5%
2017	73,491	+87.2%
2023	89,638	+22.0%

According to the 2023 census, Shahkot city has a population of 89,638.

== See also ==
- Darbar Baba Nu Lakh Hazari
