= Basti Bukna =

Pakistani village

بستی بکنہ
- Village
- Basti Bukna
- Location within Pakistan
- Coordinates: 30°42′20″N 70°39′28″E
- Country: Pakistan
- Province: Punjab
- District: Dera Ghazi Khan
- Elevation: 67 m (220 ft)

Basti Bukna (Punjabi,Urdu: بستی بکنہ) is a village in Kot Qaisrani Tehsil, Taunsa Sharif District Dera Ghazi Khan, Punjab, Pakistan.

There is a primary school in the village.
