= List of educational institutions in Dera Ghazi Khan =

This is a list of educational institutions located in the district of Dera Ghazi Khan in Pakistan.

== Primary and secondary educational institutions & Colleges ==
- Superior College, Dera Ghazi Khan
- Ghazi University
- The Educators
- ILM Group of Colleges
- Ghazi Khan Medical College
- New Al Zahra Public Model School Peer Muhammad Ghaouri
