= Morejhangi =

Mor Jhangi
- Town and union council
- Country: Pakistan
- Region: Punjab
- District: Dera Ghazi Khan District
- Time zone: UTC+5 (PST)

Mor Jhangi is a town and union council of Taunsa District in the Punjab province of Pakistan. The town is part of Taunsa Tehsil with a population of about 16,000. The Indus river flows about 3 kilometers from Mor Jhangi.
