= Makwal Kalan =

- Union council and town
- Location in Pakistan
- Coordinates: 30°35′00″N 70°44′00″E
- Country: Pakistan
- Province: Punjab
- District: Dera Ghazi Khan District
- Elevation: 443 ft (135 m)
- Time zone: UTC+5 (PST)
  - Summer (DST): +6

Makwal Kalan is a town and union council in the Taunsa Tehsil (subdivision) of Taunsa District in the Punjab province of Pakistan, and is located at 30°35'06"N 70°43'55"E at an altitude of 135 metres (443 ft).

== See also ==
- Government Boys High School Makwal Kalan
