= Chhabri =

Chabri Bala
- Union council and town
- Location in Pakistan
- Coordinates: 30°8′21″N 70°37′22″E
- Country: Pakistan
- Province: Punjab
- District: Dera Ghazi Khan District
- Established: 1960

Government
  - Chief Mastoi & Chief Chabri bala: Sardar Faheem Khan Mastoi (Chairman)
- Time zone: UTC+5 (PST)
  - Summer (DST): +6

Chabri Bala (Urdu: چھابری بالا), also called Chabri, is a village in Pakistan, located 9 kilometers north of Dera Ghazi Khan in the province of Punjab, Pakistan.

Chabri Bala means Upper Chabri. There is also Chabri Zerein, meaning Lower Chabri. Origin of name is still unclear.

== Geography ==
It is located between Old Manka Canal and new D.G. Khan canal. There is one minor canal passing by the village. Chabri Bala's population is about more than 4000 people. This village is more than 100 years old.

It is mainly occupied by the Mastoi Balouch Tribe. There is no proof who is the tribal chief of the Mastoi tribe and But Sardar Faheem Ullah khan Mastoi . he is considered as the head of the community as he serves as the Chairman of Chabri Bala village. Since He became the chairman he has contributed a lot to development of the region contributing to infrastructure and electricity problems and bringing school and colleges to the village of Chabri Bala. According to some claims, these contributions amount to several billion rupees. The village's main gathering place is called poll, meaning "bridge," referring to a very old bridge on the Manka Canal; it has many local shops and amenities. Villagers gather to shop and socialize at this place.

== Education ==
The village has four schools:

- One boys high school
- One girls high school
- One primary school
- One private school offering English medium education

== Health ==
- There is one qualified doctor clinic on a regular basis, and there are four dispensaries.
- There is also a medical store (Mastoi Medical Store).
- There is one veterinary clinic.

Although this village is fairly modern, it has many challenges including drinking water, an outdated sewage system, free health service and emergency medical service. During his tenure, Sardar Iqbal Khan Mastoi served as chairman and oversaw several development initiatives in Chabri Bala. These included improvements to the drinking water supply system, expansion of the sewage infrastructure in most areas, and provision of electricity across the village, among other developments. These projects were carried out during the 19s, reportedly with funding from his personal resources.

This village has produced many prominent professionals working in the government (e.g. Pakistan Atomic Energy Commission, Health, Education and Police department), banking, law and business sectors due to its good infrastructure.

This village is politically divided and has many players and active figures.

- Crime rate has dramatically increased in recent years, reflecting the overall situation in the country.
- The village has a cricket team which takes part in inter-village competition.
