= Fateh Khan Dodai =

Fateh Khan Dodai the son of Malik Sohrab Khan Dodai was a member of one of the most powerful families of Gujarati noblemen who probably came from Sindh.

== History ==
During the Mughal period, Malik Sohrab Khan Dodai son of Doda Soomra came to south Punjab from Makran with his three sons Malik Ghazi Khan Dodai, Malik Ismail Khan Dodai and Malik Fateh Khan Dodai, who later formed Derajat.He remained allied with opposing powers. In the initial struggle between Emperor Humayun and Sher Shah Suri and later between Emperor Humayun and his brothers, the Rind appeared to be with Humayun, while Lashars chose to support Sher Shah and, later, the rebellious brothers of Humayun. During the confusion that followed the flight of Emperor Humayun to Persia, a Baloch tribal union, headed by Fateh Khan Dodai, occupied Multan. However, after regaining the throne of India, he sent an army under the command of General Hebat Khan who, after a bloody battle, defeated the Baloch, and the Mughals retook Multan. During the reigns of Emperor Akbar the Great and Emperor Shah Jahan, Balochistan was under firm Mughal control. According to Raverty (1888), during Akbar's reign, the Mughal governor of Multan, Abdul Rahim Khan-I-Khana, sent many punitive expeditions against the Baloch. However, there is no mention of any significant encounter with the Baloch tribes during the reign of Emperor Jahangir.

For a short period, this Baloch confederacy was also able to occupy the prosperous region of Multan. As observed earlier, during the confusion that followed the flight of Mughal Emperor Humayun to Persia, the Baloch tribal union headed by Fateh Khan Dodai occupied Multan which was later retook by the Mughals Army under the command of General Hebat Khan on the orders of Emperor Humayun.
