= Roonghan =

Pakistani

Roonghan is located northwest of Dera Ghazi Khan, Punjab, Pakistan. It is home to the Balochi-speaking Leghari tribe. The area is characterised by its mountainous terrain, with Yek Bhai as its most prominent peak. Roonghan includes essential facilities, such as a government hospital and a boys' high school in Manhi.
