= Baathi Qaisrani =

Mountain Suleiman

Coordinates: 30.96029°N 70.45271°E

Baathi Qaisrani Village is center of Union Council Tuman Qaisrani and historical place of Qaisrani Tribe. Surrounded by hills and mountain stream the sight of village is pretty charming. Tuman Qaisrani is a town and union council of Tehsil kohesulaiman and District Dera Ghazi Khan at Punjab province of Pakistan. Bhada Khan Qaisrani, who had son of Qaisar Khan Qaisrani, founder of Qaisrani tribe and his son, Yaro Khan Qaisrani, left Kanwan torrent and occupied the Baathi Torrent and established Baathi Village. The most important thing of Baathi Qaisrani and Qaisrani's of Baathi village they fought first battle against the British army. (1893–97) A.H. Diack settlement officer wrote his book (Gazter-of-dera-ghazi-khan).

The only tribes who gave trouble after annexation were the Kasrani and Buzdar in the hills. 900 men under general J.S. Hodgson were sent to Bathi Qaisrani and they attacked on Baathi Qaisrani. Qaisrani's went on mountain and fought with British Army. The town or village Baathi Qaisrani, which is built on a pinnacle approached by a narrow mountain range, was taken and destroyed. Late Mahmdo Khan (Yarwani) Qaisrani was Muqadam of Qaisrani hill's area and tribal belt but his home place was Baathi Qaisrani. Baathi Qaisrani got royalty of Dhodak Oil field that place of Yarwani and still Tuman Qaisrani or Qaisrani Hills area is Tribal Area and special police (BMP) appointed for this area coming from British Government. Baathi Qaisrani remained the political hub of chief Meer Badshah qaisrani till 2013 but unfortunately being continuously ignored by the chief, rebellions turned people not to support him. Shahid Qaisrani is chairman of this village. This village also has an official page on facebook with the name in urdo( کوہ سلیمان باٹھی قیصرانی ) page admin Abdul Haseeb
