= Shadan Lund =

- Town
- Nickname: شادن لنڈ
- Location in Pakistan
- Coordinates: 30°28′07″N 70°43′48″E
- Country: Pakistan
- Province: Punjab
- District: Dera Ghazi Khan District
- Elevation: 410 ft (125 m)

Population
  - Total: 70,000
- Time zone: UTC+5 (PST)
  - Summer (DST): +6
- Postal code: 32150
- Area code: 32150

Shadan Lund (Urdu: شادن لونڈ) is a town in Dera Ghazi Khan city in Punjab, Pakistan. The town is adjacent to Tonsa District. People of this area mostly speak the Saraiki language. This town is situated near Tonsa Barrage 12 km from the Koh-e-Sulaiman mountain range. The village of Basti Azeem is located 7 km south of this city and the village of Ghuman is located 2 km south of the city.

Shadan Lund is also a union council of Dera Ghazi Khan District in the Punjab province of Pakistan.
