= Suleman Taunsvi =

Sufi scholar

Muhammad Shah Suleman Taunsvi
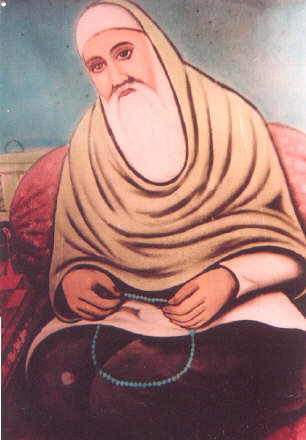

Personal life
- Born: 1770 CE Darug Town, Baluchistan
- Died: 1850 CE Taunsa Shareef, Punjab
- Other name: Peer Pathan

Religious life
- Religion: Islam

Muslim leader
- Based in: Taunsa Shareef, Punjab
- Period in office: Late 18th century and early 19th century

Muhammad Shah Suleman Taunsvi (1184 A.H / 1770 CE - 1267 A.H / 1850 CE), also known as Pir Pathan, was a Sufi scholar and spiritual leader within the Chishti order. He was born in Gargogi to the Jafar Pakhtun tribe of Darug people in present-day Loralai District, Balochistan, Pakistan.

His shrine is located in Taunsa Tehsil, Dera Ghazi Khan District, Punjab, where his urs (annual death anniversary) is observed each year from 5-7 Safar al-Muzaffar, the second month of the Islamic calendar.

== Life ==
Suleman Taunsvi was born in 1770. He studied Qur'an with Yusuf Jafar. He associated with Noor Muhammad Maharvi from whom he received spiritual training in Chishti order of Sufism.

== See also ==
- Taunsa Sharif
- Meher Ali Shah
