= Sokar (disambiguation) =

Sokar a hawk or falcon god of the Memphite necropolis in the Ancient Egyptian religion.

Sokar may also refer to:

- Sokar (yacht), a luxury yacht formerly owned by Mohamed Al-Fayed
- Sokar, Punjab, a town in India
- Sokar, a Stargate SG-1 character
