= Basti Buzdar =

Town in Punjab, Pakistan

Coordinates: 30°46′11.01″N 70°32′44.2″E

Basti buzdar is a town and union council of Dera Ghazi Khan District in the Punjab province of Pakistan. The town has a population of about 8000-9000. It is named after the Buzdar tribe, who primarily inhabit the village.

== HISTORY ==
Land of Basti Buzdar and it surrounding was property of Hasadi chiefs of native town called Mangrotha. According to oral history, the neighbour Qaisrani tribe were engaged in a rivalry with the Hasadi chiefs. Due to this fear, the chief decided to call Buzdar tribesmen to protect the land. This decision led to the foundation of Basti Buzdar. Historians are also of the view that the first person there was Noor Khan, so called to be the founder of Basti Buzdar. The Hasadi chiefs also awarded enough piece of land to Noor Khan and his companions. In 2017, the population was 8000-9000.

Prominent Personalities - Hazrat Nazar Hussain - Dr Hameed Ullah Buzdar - Sardar Ilyas Buzdar (koro)

== GEOGRAPHY ==
Town of Basti Buzdar is located on foothills of Koh e Sulaiman. Nearest villages adjacent to town are Koro, Berote, Kot Qaisrani, Meeray Wali, Jhok Khubar. It is connected to Kot Qaisrani and Taunsa with paved route.

== DEMOGRAPHY ==
It is a Baloch majority town. However due to centuries of interaction with Damaan people majority of people speak Saraiki as mother tongue rather than Balochi. Buzdar is main tribe of the town.
