= Tonsa Tehsil =

Tehsil in Punjab, Pakistan

Tonsa Tehsil تحصيل تونسہ
- Tehsil
- Location in Pakistan Tonsa Tehsil (Pakistan)
- Country: Pakistan
- Province: (Punjab, Pakistan) Punjab
- District: Tonsa

Area
  - Tehsil: 2,769 km^{2} (1,069 sq mi)

Population (2023)
  - Tehsil: 796,777
  - Estimate (2023): 580,592 (Splitting Vehova Tehsil)
  - Density: 287.7/km^{2} (745.3/sq mi)
  - Urban: 158,122 (19.85%)
  - Rural: 638,655 (80.15%)

Literacy (2023)
  - Literacy rate: 57.96%
- Time zone: UTC+5 (PST)

Tonsa Tehsil (Urdu: تحصيل تونسہ) is a tehsil (subdivision) of Tonsa District in Punjab province of Pakistan. Its capital is Tonsa city.

== Administration ==
Tonsa Tehsil is administratively subdivided into 24 Union Councils. These are:

- Nutkani
- Mithay Wali
- Basti Buzdar
- Fateh Khan
- Malkani
- Hairo
- Jhoke Bodo
- Kot Qaisrani
- Kot Mohi
- Litra Shumali
- Makwal Kalan
- Mangrotha
- Mor Jhangi
- Narri Shumali
- Buzdar Shumali
- Sokar
- Tibbi Qaisrani
- Vehoa Shumali
- Vehova Janubi
- Kot Quaisrani
- Dauna\ downa
- Sanjar Saidan
- Jalu Wali
- Lakhani
- Faiz abad

== Demographics ==
=== Population ===
Historical population
Year	Pop.	±% p.a.
1951	101,201	—
1961	116,729	+1.44%
1972	162,082	+3.03%
1981	225,800	+3.75%
1998	365,684	+2.88%
2017	677,785	+3.30%
2023	796,777	+2.73%

As of the 2023 census, Tonsa Tehsil has population of 796,777. Out of which, Urban population is 158,122 which is nearly 19.85% and rural population is 638,655.

As of the 2023 census, Tonsa Tehsil has a total literacy rate of 57.96%, with male literacy at 68.38% and female literacy at 46.94%.
