= IRSA (disambiguation) =

IRSA may refer to:

- Istituto per le Ricerche di Storia dell'Arte, a publishing house in Poland
- Inversiones y Representaciones Sociedad Anónima, a real estate development firm in Argentina
- Indus River System Authority, an agency of the Pakistani government
- NASA/IPAC Infrared Science Archive
- NATO phonetic alphabet, also commonly called International Radiotelephony Spelling Alphabet.
