= De-Excluded Area =

De-Excluded Area may refer to:

- De-Excluded Area D.G. Khan Tehsil
- De-Excluded Area Rajanpur Tehsil
