= Tonsa Barrage =

Indus River barrage in Punjab, Pakistan

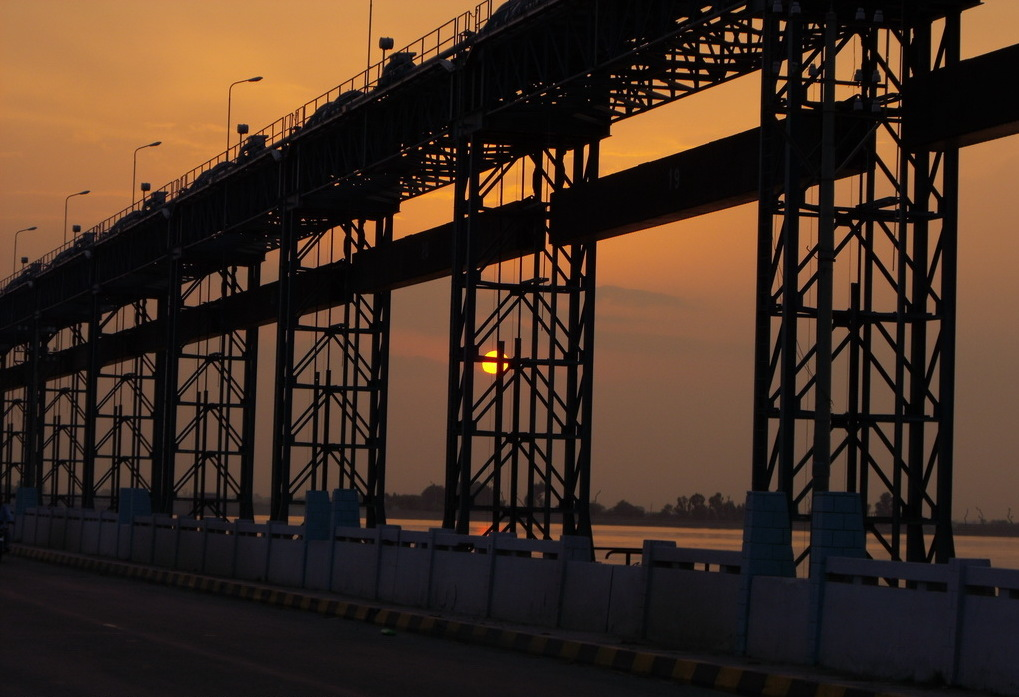
- Taunsa Barrage at sunset
- Interactive map of Tonsa Barrage
- Official name: تونسہ بیراج
- Country: Pakistan
- Location: Punjab
- Coordinates: 30°30′46″N 70°50′57″E
- Construction began: 1952
- Opening date: 1958
- Operator: Project Management Office (PMO) for Punjab Barrages, Rehabilitation & Modernization Projects

Dam and spillways
- Impounds: Indus River
- Length: 4,346 feet (1,325 m)
- Spillway capacity: Up to 1 million cusec

Ramsar Wetland
- Designated: 22 March 1996

Taunsa Barrage (Urdu: تونسہ بیراج), also spelled Tonsa Barrage, is a barrage on the River Indus in Taunsa, Punjab province of Pakistan. It is situated 20 kilometres (12 miles) southeast of main Taunsa city and Shadan Lund and 16 kilometres (9.9 miles) from district Kot Addu. This barrage controls water flow in the River Indus for irrigation and flood control purposes. Taunsa Barrage Wildlife Sanctuary was designated a Ramsar site on 22 March 1996.

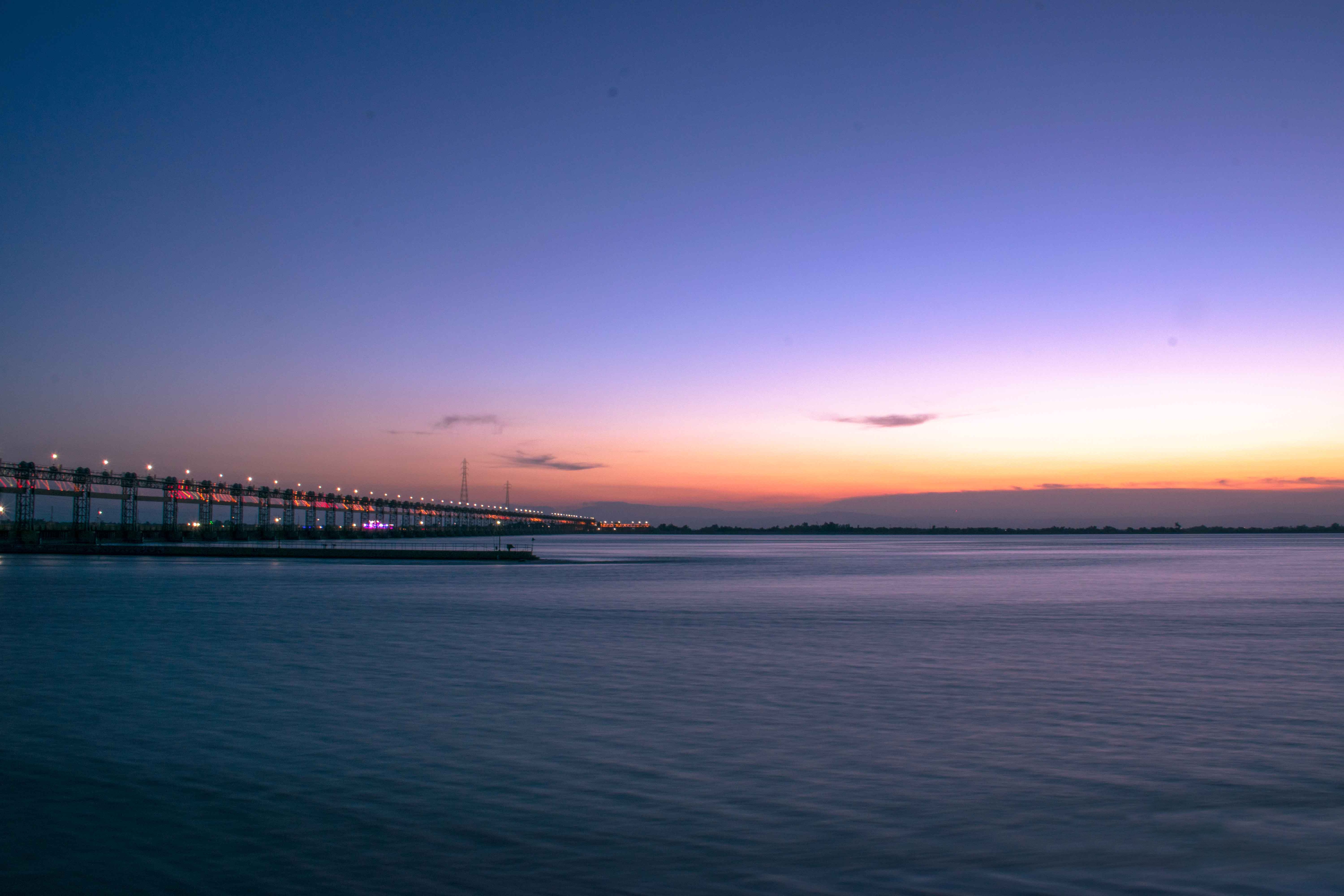
Taunsa Barrage at dusk

This barrage serves 951,400 hectares of land besides diverting flows from Indus River to the Chenab River through Taunsa–Panjnad Link Canal (TP Link Canal). The barrage also serves as an arterial road bridge, a railway bridge, and crossing for gas and oil pipelines, telephone line and extra high voltage (EHV) transmission lines.

== Background ==
Taunsa Barrage was completed in 1958. Head Draftsman Syed Tufail Hussain Shah received Silver Medal from President of Pakistan Field Marshal Mohammad Ayub Khan on commendable services rendered on the completion of Taunsa Barrage on 3 March 1959. The canal system fed by the barrage initially consisted of Muzaffargarh and Dera Ghazi Khan Khan canals. The former was completed in 1960 and has been in operation since then, while the latter although opened in 1958 continued to remain under construction in some later years. TP Link canal was added in 1970, as a component work.

Taunsa Barrage has been identified as the barrage with the highest priority for rehabilitation. It requires urgent measures to avoid severe economic and social impacts on the lives of millions of poor farmers through interruption of irrigation on 8,000 km^{2} and drinking water in the rural areas of southern Punjab, benefiting several million farmers. Taunsa Barrage is one of the most vulnerable water diversion projects built on Indus River.

In April 2004, the World Bank approved a $123 million loan to Pakistan to rehabilitate the Taunsa Barrage, whose structure had been damaged owing to soil erosion and old-age. The project was designed to ensure irrigation of the cultivated lands in the area of the Muzaffargarh and Dera Ghazi Khan Tehsil canals, and through the TP Link Canal that supplements the water supply to Panjnad headworks canals.

In 2011, the rehabilitation of the Taunsa Barrage was blamed for devastation of the Muzaffargarh district during the 2010 Pakistan floods. Critics blamed the rehabilitation of the barrage, alleging that it failed to raise its height and strengthen protective embankments, used dysfunctional computer control system of the hoist gates and ignored hill-torrent management.
