= Mangrotha =

Town in Punjab, Pakistan

Mangrotha is a town of two parts of union councile i.e Mangrotha East and Mangrotha West, located near Koh-e Sulaman which is a mineral-rich mountains area in Pakistan. It is a union council of Taunsa District in the Punjab province of Pakistan

== Geography ==
The town is part of Taunsa Tehsil. It is located at 30°43'0N 70°34'60E and has an altitude of 181 metres (594 ft).
