= Kaura =

Kaura may refer to:

== People ==
- Katuutire Kaura (1941–2022), Namibian politician
- Kaura Khan Qaisrani (born 1812), chieftain of the Qaisrani tribe in Balochistan, Pakistan
- Satish Kumar Kaura (born 1944), Indian technocrat and industrialist

== Places ==
- Kaura, Iran, a village in Fars Province, Iran
- Kaura, Kaduna State, Nigeria, a local government area
- Kaura Lighthouse, a lighthouse located in the municipality of Roan in Sør-Trøndelag county, Norway
- Kaura Namoda, a local government area in Zamfara State, Nigeria

== Other uses ==
- Kaura (band), an American progressive alternative rock band from Los Angeles, California formed in 2005
- Kaura (dance), a traditional folk dance indigenous to Nepal
- Kaura, the former German submarine U-995, used by Norway after World War II
- Kaurna peoples of the Adelaide Plains area, South Australia, sometimes spelt Kaura
  - Kaurna language
