= Khalid Abad =

Coordinates: 29°58′45″N 70°34′50″E

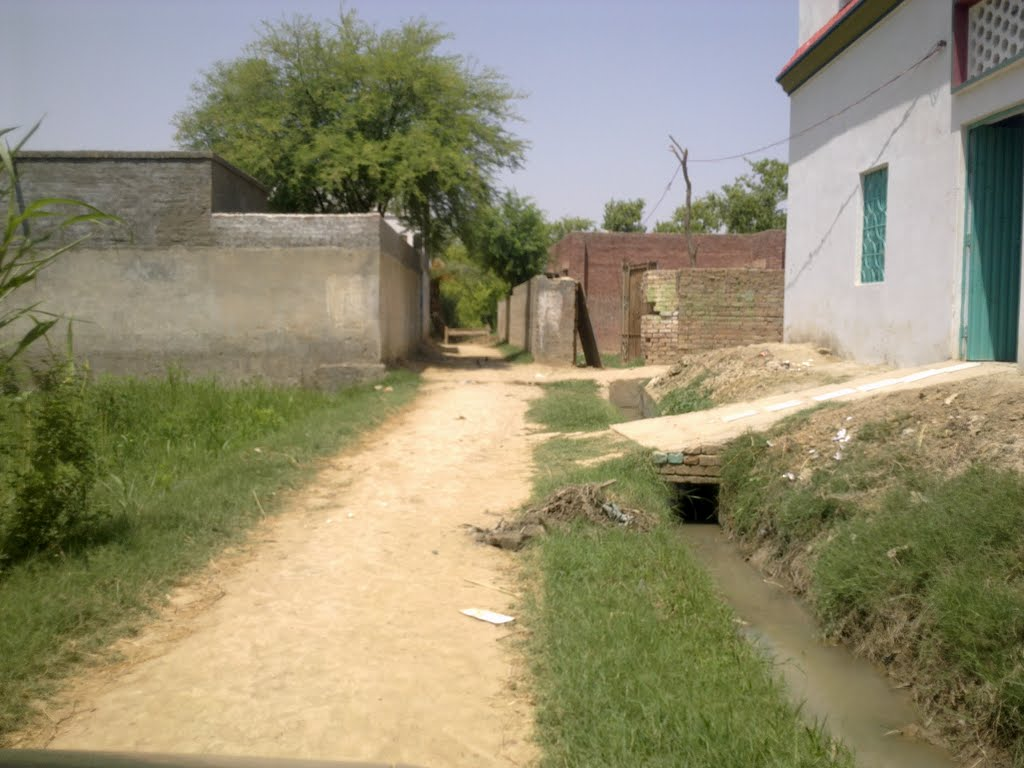
Khalidabad, D.G. Khan

Khalid Abad is a village in Dera Ghazi Khan District, Punjab Province, Pakistan. The village has a mosque and school. Its population is about 2,000. Literacy is about 70%.
