= Dodai (tribe) =

Baloch tribe in Pakistan

Dodai is a Baloch tribe. In Balochistan, Dodais are also included in Brahuis. Tribesmen of Dodai went on to found the towns of Dera Ismail Khan, Dera Ghazi Khan and Dera Fateh Khan. The Dodai rule lasted till the middle of the 18th century.

== Origin and branches ==
The Dodai claim descent from Doda, a Soomro king of Sindh. The main branches of Dodais are Gurchani, Mirani and Kulachi.

It has been described as a Rajput tribe of probably Sindhi origin, which assimilated into the Baloch tribesmen and became a part of the Baloch confederation.

== See also ==
- Malik Sohrab Dodai
- Gurchani
- Mirani
