= Basti Azeem =

Pakistani village

Basti Azeem بستی عظیم
- village
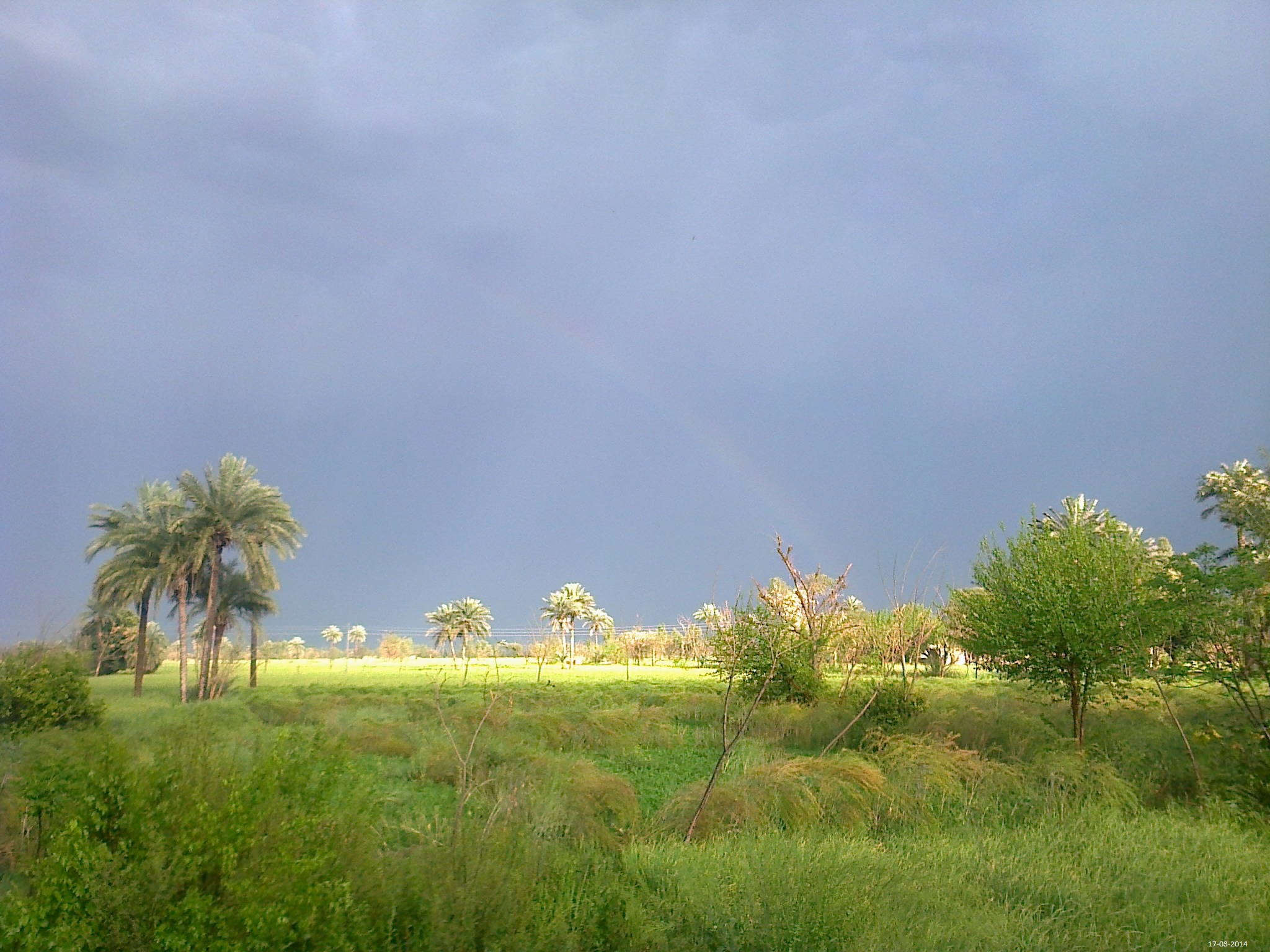

- Location in Dera Ghazi Khan District, Punjab, Pakistan
- Coordinates: 30.405008°N 70.738403°E
- Country: Pakistan
- District: Dera Ghazi Khan
- Time zone: UTC+5 (PKT)
- Area code: 064

Basti Azeem is a village in Dera Ghazi Khan district of Punjab, Pakistan, which is named by Haji Muhammad Azeem Khan Gurchani (Waliyani). This village is located near Indus Highway, 45 km from Dera Ghazi Khan. Hiltorent Sori is located in southern side of this village. The main occupation of the people of this village is agriculture. Wheat, cotton and vegetables are important crops of this area. The Saraiki and Urdu languages are used in this village.

The mosque Azeem Masjid (عظیم مسجد) is located in the village, which was built on 2 February 1991 and upgraded in April 2014, it has a capacity for over 200 people.
