= Taunsa Barrage Wildlife Sanctuary =

Ramsar site in Punjab, Pakistan

- IUCN category IV (habitat/species management area)
- Interactive map of Taunsa Barrage Wildlife Sanctuary
- Location: Punjab, Pakistan
- Coordinates: 30.53°N 70.85°E
- Area: 6,756 ha (16,690 acres)
- Designation: Wildlife Sanctuary
- Established: 1974
- Governing body

Ramsar Wetland
- Designated: 22 March 1996
- Reference no.: 817

Taunsa Barrage Wildlife Sanctuary is located near Taunsa Barrage, in Dera Ghazi Khan District of Punjab, Pakistan. In 1974, it was designated as a wildlife refuge under the Punjab Wildlife Act promulgated the same year. The sanctuary is made up of numerous ponds and lakes situated between embankments, as well as a sizable water reservoir.

== Flora and fauna ==
The sanctuary's vegetation includes a riverine forest and a wide variety of water plants. Waterfowl, especially Anatidae (ducks, geese, swans, etc.), which breed in the region, use it as a critical wintering place. Some species of cranes and shorebirds use it as a staging area as well.

Indus river dolphin is one of the many fish, reptiles, birds, and mammals that call the sanctuary home. It has enormous potential to grow ecotourism in this region of Pakistan.

== Activities ==
Commercial fishing, irrigating fields, gathering reeds, and recreation are among the human activities allowed in the sanctuary. Agriculture, animal grazing, and forestry are also practiced in the nearby areas.

== See also ==
- List of Ramsar wetland sites in Pakistan
