= Lakhani, Punjab =

Lakhani
- Union council and town
- Location in Pakistan
- Coordinates: 30°57′55″N 70°33′55″E
- Country: Pakistan
- Province: Punjab
- District: Tonsa District
- Elevation: 594 ft (181 m)
- Time zone: UTC+5 (PST)
  - Summer (DST): +6

Lakhani (Urdu: لکھانی) is a town and union council of Tonsa District in the Punjab province of Pakistan. Part of the district's Tonsa Tehsil, the town is located at 30°57'55N 70°33'55E and has an altitude of 181 metres (597 feet).
