= Gadai, Punjab =

Coordinates: 30°1′0″N 70°37′0″E

Gadai
- Union council and town
- Location in Pakistan
- Country: Pakistan
- Province: Punjab
- District: Dera Ghazi Khan District
- Elevation: 374 ft (114 m)
- Time zone: UTC+5 (PST)
  - Summer (DST): +6

Gadai is a town and union council of Dera Ghazi Khan District in the Punjab province of Pakistan. It is located at 30°1'0N 70°37'0E and has an altitude of 114 metres (377 feet).

== Notable people ==
- Mehmood Khan Leghari
- Maulana Muhammad khan Leghari
