= Tonsa =

City in Punjab, Pakistan

Tonsa تونسہ
- City
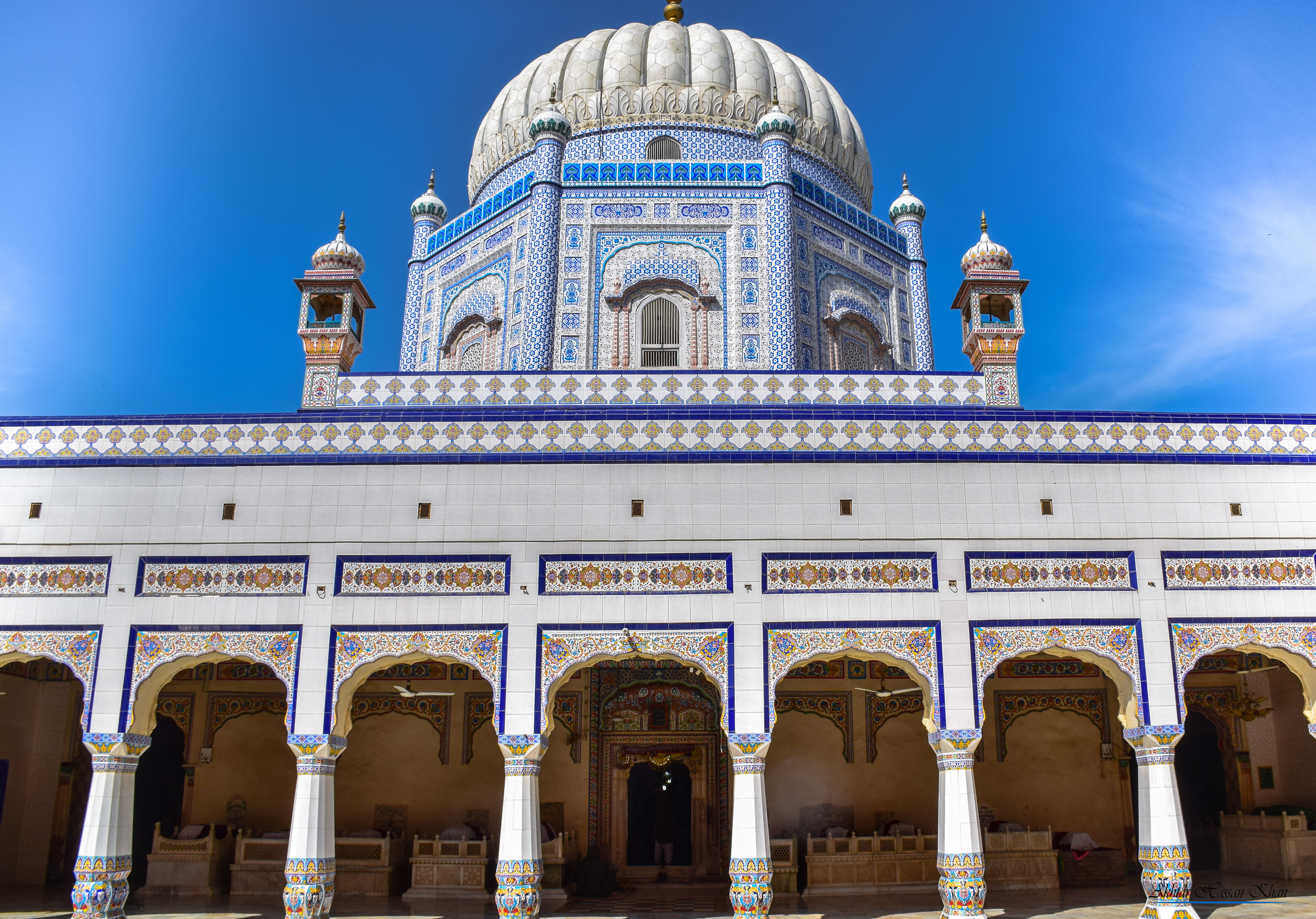
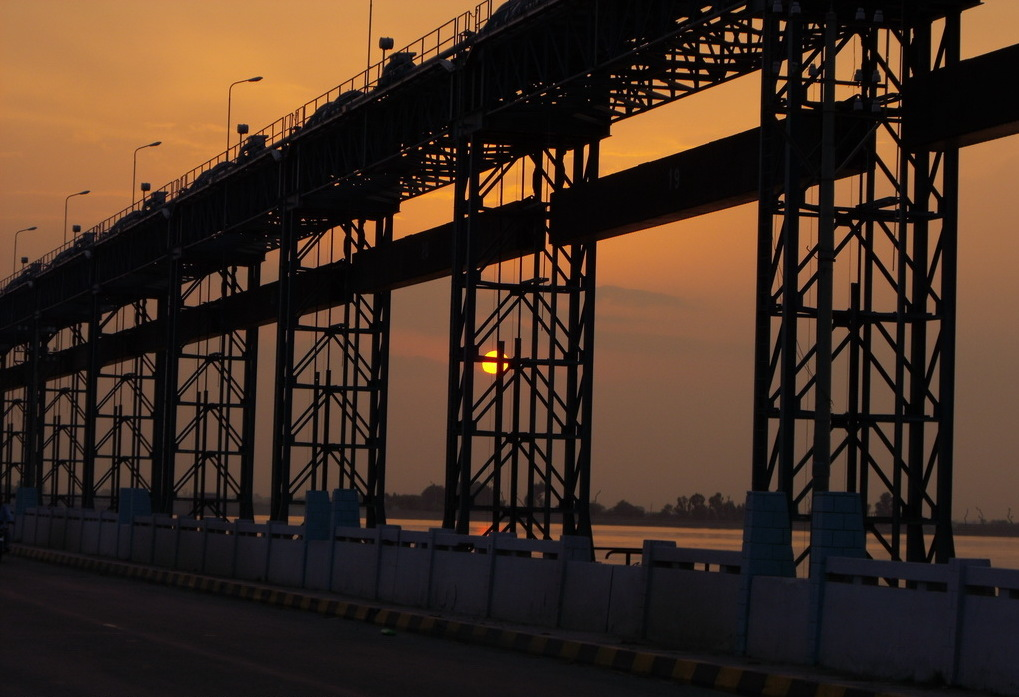
- Shrine of Pir Pathan Tonsa Barrage

- Location in Pakistan
- Coordinates: 30°42′20″N 70°39′28″E
- Country: Pakistan
- Province: (Punjab, Pakistan) Punjab
- District: Tonsa
- Tehsil: Tonsa

Government
  - Type: Municipal Committee
  - Chief Officer: Khawaja Ali Ammar Yasir
  - Deputy Commissioner: Muhammad Usman Khalid
- Elevation: 157 m (515 ft)

Population (2023)
  - City: 115,704
  - Rank: 107th in Pakistan (2023)
- Time zone: UTC+05:00 (PKT)
  - Summer (DST): UTC+6 (PDT)
- Post code: 32100
- Area code: 0642

Tonsa (Note: Urdu: تونسہ; Also spelled Taunsa) is a city in the Punjab province of Pakistan. It is the capital of Tonsa District. Located on the bank of the Indus River, the city is considered a cultural centre of the south Punjab region of Pakistan.

Tonsa is known for its agricultural and irrigational significance. The city is primarily inhabited by Saraiki-speaking people, with a significant minority of Balochi speakers.

== Etymology ==
The name Tonsa (تونسہ) is said to be derived from the Saraiki word Tass (تس), which means "thirst". As such, the city supposedly gained its name due to lack of water and scarcity in the region. The city has also been known as Tonsa Sharif ("Noble Tonsa") due to the shrine of Pir Pathan being located in the city.

== Location ==
Tonsa is located on the Karachi-Peshawar Highway, which is also known as Indus Highway. It is approximately 120 kilometers from Multan, 975 kilometres (606 mi) from Karachi, 430 kilometres (270 mi) from Peshawar, and 450 kilometres (280 mi) from Lahore. Tonsa is also the location of one of the headworks on the Indus River called Tonsa Barrage. Tonsa is surrounded by Koh-e-Sulaiman mountain range.

== History ==
Tonsa became a renowned city amongst Sufi circles when Pir Pathan shifted to the city in order to spread teachings of Islam in the late 18th to early 19th-century.

=== Tonsa Barrage ===
Tonsa is also the location of one of the notable structures on the Indus River called Tonsa Barrage, located several kilometres south of Tonsa city. It was designated a Ramsar site on 22 March 1996. The Tonsa Barrage was completed in 1958, and it has been identified as the barrage with the highest priority for rehabilitation. It requires urgent measures to avoid severe economic and social impacts on the lives of millions of poor farmers through interruption of irrigation on two million acres (8,000 km^{2}) and drinking water in the rural areas of southern Punjab, benefiting several million farmers.

In 2003, the World Bank approved a $123 million loan to Pakistan to rehabilitate the Tonsa Barrage on the River Indus whose structure had been damaged owing to soil erosions and old-age. The project was designed to ensure irrigation of the cultivated lands in the area of the Muzaffargarh and Dera Ghazi Khan Tehsil canals, and through the Tonsa–Panjnad Link Canal that supplements the water supply to Panjnad headworks canals.

Tonsa Barrage also serves to provide for a variety of fish, which contributes towards fulfilling the food related needs of area.

== Demographics ==
Historical population
Year	Pop.	±% p.a.
1951	7,253	—
1961	9,712	+2.96%
1972	13,439	+3.00%
1981	19,934	+4.48%
1998	38,297	+3.92%
2017	97,193	+5.02%
2023	115,704	+2.95%

According to 2023 census, Tonsa had a population of 115,704.
