= Dera Fateh Khan =

Fateh Khan
- Union council and town
- Location in Pakistan
- Coordinates: 31°4′N 70°43′E
- Country: Pakistan
- Province: Punjab
- District: Dera Ghazi Khan District
- Elevation: 460 ft (140 m)

Population
  - Religions: Islam
- Time zone: UTC+5 (PST)
  - Summer (DST): +6

Fateh Khan or Dera Fateh Khan is a town and union council of Taunsa District in the Punjab province of Pakistan. The town is part of Taunsa Tehsil. It is located at 31°4'0N 70°43'0E and has an altitude of 140 metres (462 feet).

It is named after Dodai mercenary Fateh Khan, son of Malik Sohrab Dodai, who founded the town.
