= Tonsa–Panjnad Link Canal =

Inter-river canal in Punjab, Pakistan

Taunsa–Panjnad Link Canal
- Location: Punjab, Pakistan
- Country: Pakistan

Specifications
- Length: 58.2 km (36.2 miles) (191 RDs (approx.))

History
- Date completed: 1970s

Geography
- Beginning coordinates: 30°30′46″N 70°50′57″E
- Ending coordinates: 29°20′49″N 71°01′11″E

The Taunsa–Panjnad Link Canal (abbreviated TP Link Canal) is an inter-river canal in Punjab, Pakistan. It diverts water from the Indus River at Taunsa Barrage to the Chenab River and Panjnad Headworks systems for irrigation and balancing of flows between western and eastern rivers. The canal was built as part of the post-Indus Waters Treaty link-canal programme under the Water and Power Development Authority (WAPDA).In 2025, the canal accounted for an estimated transfer of over 3,000 cusecs at its peak flow.

== History ==
The canal was planned in the 1960s and commissioned in the 1970s as part of the Indus Basin "replacement work" designed to transfer surplus Indus water to the Chenab-Ravi system after the Indus Waters Treaty (1960). It was constructed to maintain irrigation supplies in southern Punjab during periods of low flow in the Chenab and its tributaries.

== Location and Length ==
The canal takes off from the left bank of Taunsa Barrage on the Indus River and outfalls into the Panjnad system near the Muzaffargarh District. It has an authorised discharge capacity of about 12,000 cubic feet per second (cusecs) and a length of roughly 58 kilometres (36 mi). The canal passes through largely agricultural terrain and contributes to irrigation of cotton and wheat areas in Multan Division.

== Operation ==
The Taunsa–Panjnad Link Canal operates under the supervision of the Indus River System Authority (IRSA) according to allocations made in the 1991 "Water Apportionment Accord (Pakistan)|Water Apportionment Accord" . The canal is primarily used for transferring Indus water to supplement the Chenab system when flows decline in the eastern rivers. It is primarily operated to balance shortages between the Indus and Chenab systems. The Indus River System Authority (IRSA) adjusts the canal’s flow depending on Indus River levels, generally maintaining a discharge between 2,000 and 4,000 cubic feet per second (cusecs). According to IRSA records and provincial irrigation departments, the canal’s operation becomes crucial during early summer when the Indus system experiences reduced inflows. In 2025, IRSA reported that the canal helped stabilise supplies to the Thal Canal and Panjnad Headworks, following a period of over 50 per cent shortfall in the Punjab canal system. Punjab’s Irrigation Department stated that stem losses in the Indus had reached about 1.60 million acre-feet, prompting controlled diversions through the TP Link Canal to maintain irrigation supply.

== 2025 controversy ==
In April 2025, the Government of Sindh urged IRSA to close the TP Link Canal, claiming that the diversion deprived lower-riparian areas of essential Indus water. According to reports, discharge in the canal rose from 2,981 to 3,814 cusecs that week. Senator Sherry Rehman described the canal’s opening as “irresponsible” and “a violation of inter-provincial harmony”. IRSA defended the operation, stating it was done within the limits of provincial shares.

== See also ==
- Taunsa Barrage
- Panjnad Headworks
- Indus Waters Treaty
