= Payala Lake Ghazi Ghat =

Lake in Sindh

- Piyala Lake
- Interactive map of Payala Lake Ghazi Ghat
- Location: Dera Ghazi Khan District, Punjab, Pakistan
- Coordinates: 30°04′00″N 70°47′30″E
- Basin countries: Pakistan
- Max. length: 31 km (19 mi)
- Max. width: 6 km (3.7 mi)
- Surface area: 9,842 ha (24,320 acres)
- Average depth: 6 m (20 ft)
- Max. depth: 7.9 metres (26 ft)
- Water volume: 0.53×10^{6} acre⋅ft (650 hm^{3})
- Surface elevation: 15 metres (49 ft)

Payala or Piyala Lake Ghazi Ghat (Urdu پیالہ جھیل غازی گھاٹ) is an artificial lake situated near Ghazi Ghat on Indus River near Dera Ghazi Khan District, Punjab, Pakistan. It is being developed for tourism purposes in Southern Punjab. Pyala means bowl in the Urdu language, it is named that due to its bowl shape and deep water body.

Assistant Professor Dr. Inayat Ullah From Ghazi University has started research on its seasonal biological, chemical and o physical factors.

== See also ==
- Fort Munro
- Pyala Lake, Kaghan Valley
