= Hairo =

Mauza Hairo
- Hairo
- Location within Pakistan
- Coordinates: 29.80°N 70.60°E
- Country: Pakistan
- Province: Punjab, Rajanpur, Tehsil Jampur

Government

Area
  - Total: 40 km^{2} (15 sq mi)
- Elevation: 103 m (338 ft)

Population
  - Estimate (2026): 29,000
  - Density: 150/km^{2} (390/sq mi)
- Time zone: UTC+5 (PST)
- Calling code: 604
- Name of Union council: Kotla Dewan

Mauza Hairo is a village of Jampur tehsil, Union Council Hairo Num 12, Rajanpur District. It is located 15 km southeast of Jampur near the Kotla Mughlan. About 1000 years ago there was a city. The Indus River washed all the city away, and it remained flooded for about 25 years. Once again in July 2010, Hairo was included in flooded area. The Government of Pakistan and Pakistan Army attempted to help the people affected by the 2010 flood. Mostly, the people speak Saraiki and Balochi.

The foundation of this Mauza was laid by Ghulam Hassan Khan Gopang. The name "Mauza Hairo" was officially selected and declared in the year 2000. Since then, this area has been officially recognized by the name of Mauza Hairo in all revenue and government records.

Ghulam Hassan Khan Gopang played a vital and historic role in the establishment, settlement, and development of this Mauza Hairo.

== Flood of 2010 ==
In July 2010, Hairo was hit by a flood, which caused emigration of inhabitants to dry areas. Pakistan Army helped the affected people. The flood caused many economic problems for the people there. The Government of Pakistan provided the Watan Card for the flood-affected. Food and water were also provided by the government to the people.

== Education ==
There are five primary schools and one middle school opened in 2006.

== Economy ==
Mostly these people depends upon agriculture products such as tobacco, wheat, cotton. Due to location near the river it is also known for cattle and buffalo. There is a big delta in the Indus River and it is a green grazing place for animals.

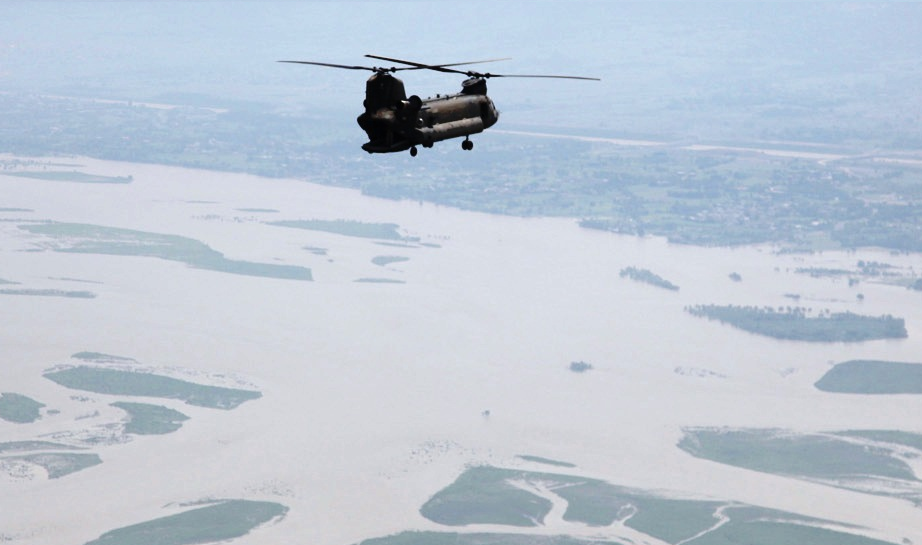
US Army helicopter flies over a flood-affected area in 2010

== See also ==
- Punjab (Pakistan)
- Pakistan
- Dera Ghazi Khan
- Kotla Mughlan
