= Kaura Khan Qaisrani =

Kaura Khan Qaisrani was the Ziledar of Tibbi Qaisrani. He was also the Wadera of his clan when the son of Sardar Mitha Khan Qaisrani.
