= Mirani (clan) =

Baloch tribe in Punjab and Sindh, Pakistan

The Mirani is a Baloch tribe, which was influential in Derajat between the 15th and 18th centuries. The dynasty was founded by Haji Khan Mirrani I, the founder of Dera Ghazi Khan, who named it after his son, Ghazi Khan. From 1550, the dynasty became stronger and more authoritative in Derajat and held it till 1787.

== History ==
In 1476 Nawab Ghazi Khan Mirani, son of Haji Khan Mirani, a Baloch chieftain, who had declared independence from the Langah dynasty Sultans of Multan. Haji, gave his name to the city which he founded before the end of the fifteenth century. The Derajat owes its existence as an historical area to the Baloch immigration in the fifteenth century. Sultan Husain, the Langah sovereign of Multan, being unable to hold his trans-Indus possessions, called in Baloch mercenaries, and assigned these territories to Haji Khan in his jagir. His sons, Ghazi Khan, Ismail Khan and Fateh Khan, founded the three Deras or 'settlements' named after them. Captain Hector Mackenzie said that rather more than three centuries ago the Derajat was under the government of some Baloch families. To the north, including Dera Ismail Khan, the Hot family, and to the south, with head -quarters at Dera Ghazi Khan, the Mirhani branch of the tribe ruled large sections of the country. Ghazi Khan Mirhani sent four of his sons across the indus to colonize the Sindh Sagar Doab. Beginning from the south, Udo Khan founded Kot Udo, Sultan Khan, Kot Sultan, Kamal Khan, Leis, and Muhammad Khan, Nowshera. They were also accompanied by a miscellaneous body of emigrants to till the ground Kamal was the most powerful of the four brothers, and assumed a supremacy over the other three. His influence extended from Kot Udo to Bhadkal, now a deserted village in the Jharkal property, some 25 miles north of Layyah, thus including the Koraishi colony. Further north the Jaskani Baloch clan, rulers of Dera Ismail Khan, held possession of the country.
