= Tuman Qaisrani =

Tuman Khan
- Town and union council
- Country: Pakistan
- Region: Punjab
- District: Dera Ghazi Khan District
- Time zone: UTC+5 (PST)

Tuman Qaisrani is a town and union council of Dera Ghazi Khan District in the Punjab province of Pakistan. The town is part of Tehsil Tribal Area. It is the northernmost of all the organized Tumans touching the border of Khyber Pakhtunkhwa.
