= Kot Qaisrani =

Town in Punjab, Pakistan

Kot Qaisrani is a town located in Taunsa District in the Punjab province of Pakistan. It is the part of Taunsa Tehsil and located at 30°48'0N 70°32'60E.
