= Noor Muhammad Maharvi =

Muslim saint (1729–1793)

- نور محمد مہاروی
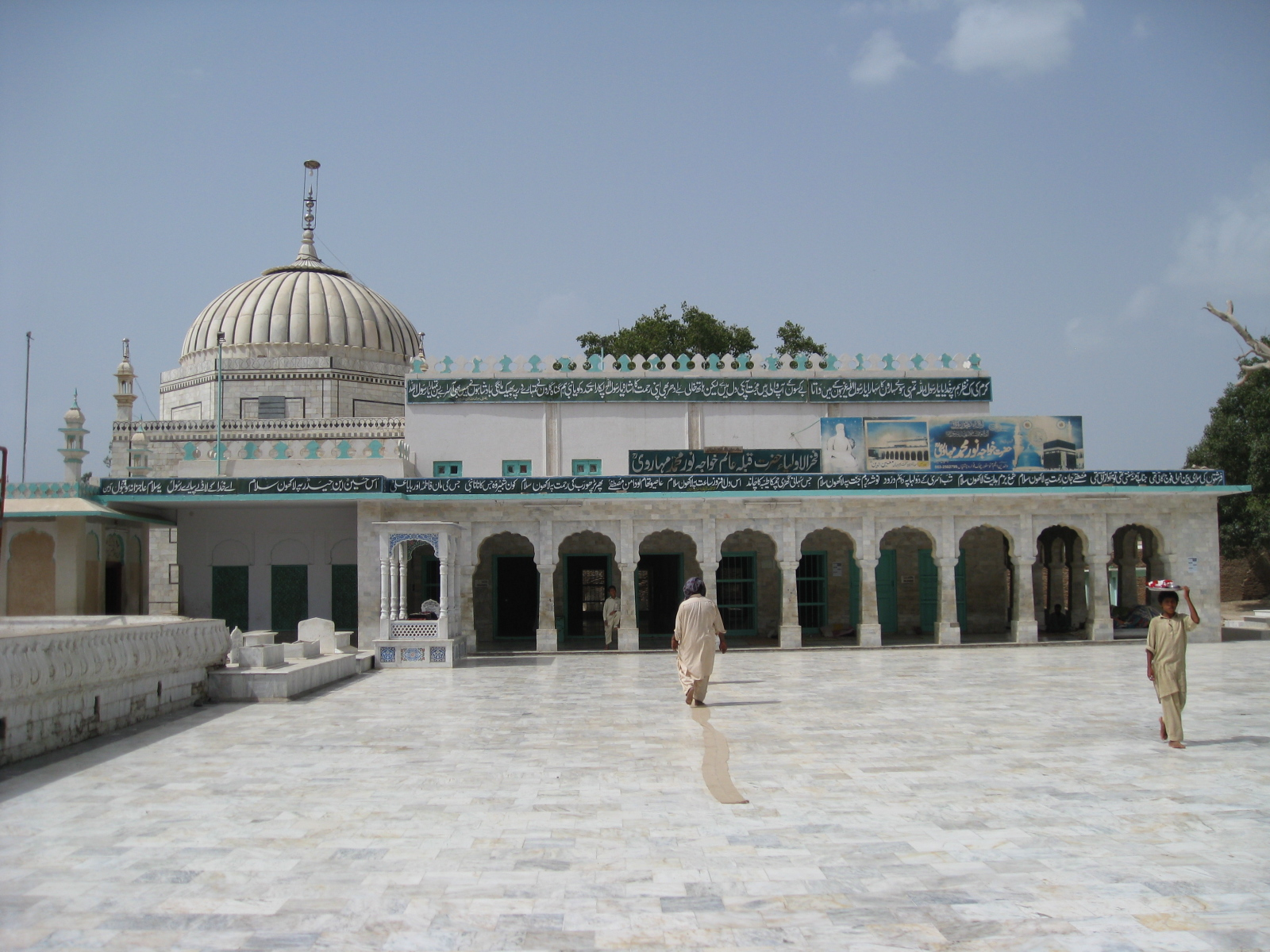
- Shrine of Nūr Muhammad Maharvi at Chishtian

Personal life
- Born: Bahbal; 2 April 1729 Chhotala village, Chishtian, Subah of Lahore, Mughal Empire
- Died: 3 August 1790 (aged 61) Mahar Sharif, Chishtian, Kingdom of Bahawalpur
- Resting place: Shrine of Nūr Muhammad, Chishtian
- Parents: Hindaal (father); Aaqil Bibi (mother)

Religious life
- Religion: Islam
- Denomination: Sunni
- Order: Chishti order
- Jurisprudence: Hanafi

Muslim leader
- Predecessor: Maulana Fakhruddin

Khawaja Nūr Muhammad Maharvi (Punjabi: خواجہ نور محمد مہاروی; born 2 April 1729/1730, died 3 August 1790) was a Punjabi Sufi saint of Chishti Order from Chishtian, Punjab, Pakistan.

== Early life and education ==
Maharvi was born in 1729 or 1730 at Chhotala near Bahawalnagar in a Punjabi Muslim family of Kharal tribe. His birth name was Bahbal; he was given name Noor Muhammad by Shah Fakhruddin. He started his early education in the small village of Mahar at the age of 4 under the supervision of hafiz Muhammad Masʽud, located near Chishtian. He later pursued his education in Delhi in the madrasa of Ghaziuddin Khan under Shah Fakhruddin. Noor Muhammad pledged his allegiance to Shah Fakhruddin on February 1752, who made him a khalifa of the Fakhri branch of Chishti Order. In the same year, he arrived at Pakpattan together with maulana Fakhruddin, which marked the end of his education. Fakhruddin then instructed Maharvi to return to Mahar Sharif and preach to the public. Maharvi died in 1790 and was buried at Taj Sarowar, 3 miles away from Mahar.

== Teachings ==
Maharvi is well-known in the region of Bahawalpur, especially after Bahawal Khan Abbasi II, ruler of Bahawalpur, became associated with him. The Sufi poet Khwaja Ghulam Farid also considered Nur Muhammad his spiritual guide, and wrote a kafi about him:

Arab vi teḍi, ʿAjam vi teḍi

Sīnd, Panjāb da raja

"You are in possession of Arabia and Ajam [and your status is as of the] raja of Sindh and Punjab."

Maharvi's teachings influenced conversion to Islam of many native tribes in Punjab and Sindh. Maharvi had over 40 disciples, including Suleman Taunsvi.

== Family ==
Family Tree of Descendants of Noor Muhammad Maharvi

Noor Muhammad Maharvi had three sons (Noor us-Samad, Noor Ahmad, and Noor Hassan) and two daughters.

== Death ==
His dargah is located in Chishtian where his urs (death anniversary) is observed every year on the 1–3 day of the month Dhul al-Hijjah.

=== Shrine ===
The shrine of Maharvi was built shortly after his death. His disciple Suleman Taunsvi bought an acre of land surrounding his tomb and started the construction of the shrine. Later works were managed by his disciple Muhammad Aqil, who took responsibility for constructing the shrine's dome, and Muhammad Jamal Multani who played a major role in erecting the outer walls. Shelter for pilgrims are located on the right side of the courtyard, which was constructed by his descendants.
