= Sokar, Punjab =

Sokar
- Union council and town

Sokar is a town and union council of Taunsa District in the Punjab province of Pakistan. The town is part of Taunsa Tehsil. It is located at 30°38'60N 70°35'60E and has an altitude of 176 metres (580 feet). The town was established by Mir Chakar Khan Rind after he captured Sanghar pass. The town was named after one of Chakar Rind's warriors Malagh Khan Rind whose sword reportedly weighed 75 kg and nobody except Malagh was able to fight with that sword. Malgahni Baloch tribe is actually generation of Malagh Khan Rind.
