= Tibbi Qaisrani =

Tibbi Qaisrani ٹبی قیصرانی
- Town and Union Council
- Basti Morani Baloch
- Location in Pakistan
- Coordinates: 31°0′0″N 70°41′0″E
- Country: Pakistan
- Province: Punjab
- District: Taunsa
- Elevation: 449 ft (137 m)
- Time zone: UTC+5 (PST)
  - Summer (DST): +6

Tibbi Qaisrani is a town and union council of Taunsa District in the Punjab province of Pakistan. Part of the district's Taunsa Tehsil, the town is located at 31° 0'18.52"N 70°40'27.51"E and has an altitude of 137 metres (452 feet).
