= Panjnad Headworks =

Barrage on the Panjnad River in Punjab, Pakistan

Coordinates: 29.3469°N 71.0196°E

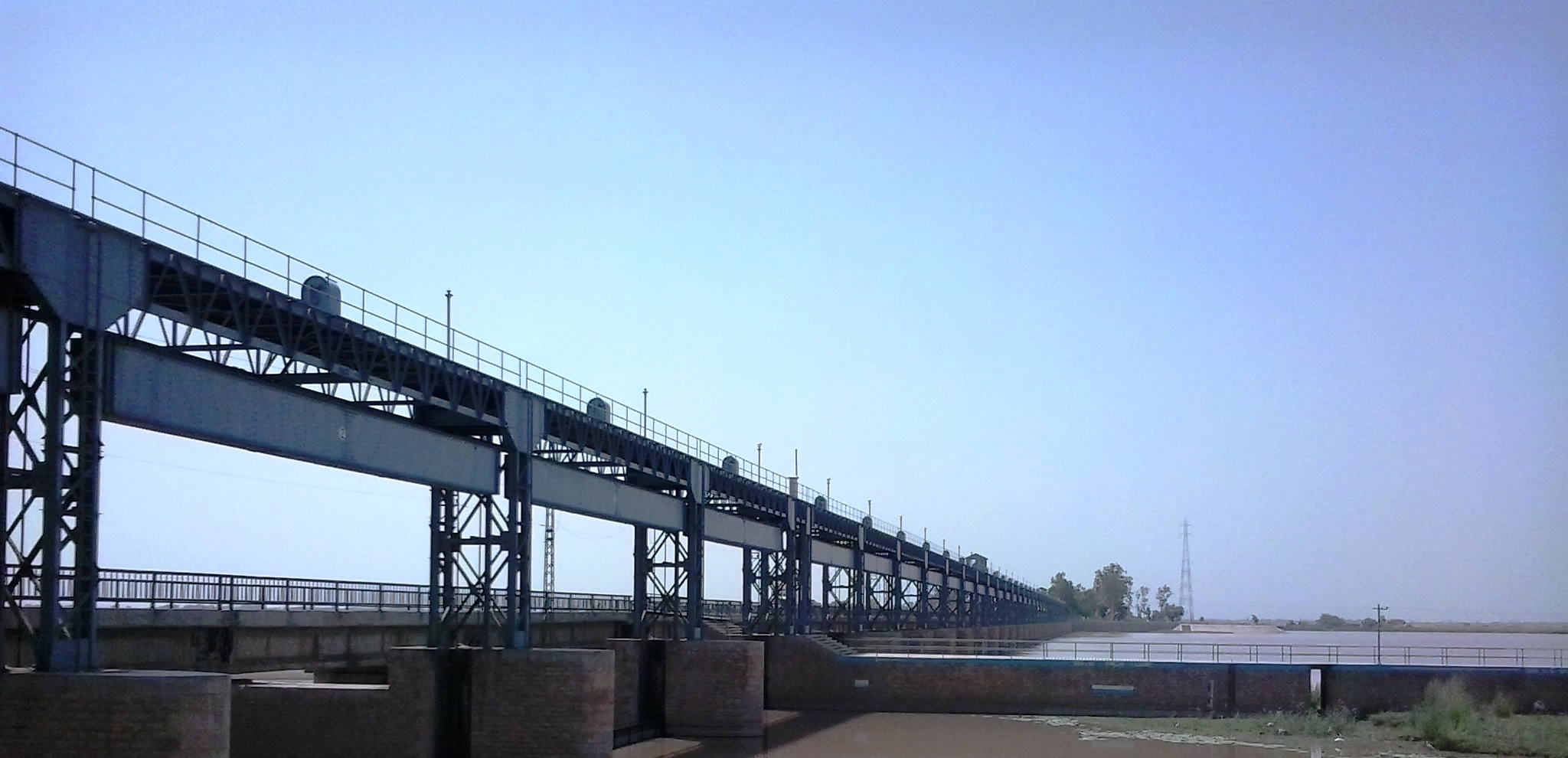
- Interactive map of Panjnad Headworks
- Location: Bahawalpur Division, Punjab, Pakistan
- Purpose: Irrigation, flood control
- Status: Operational
- Opening date: 1932
- Owner: Punjab Irrigation Department

Dam and spillways
- Type of dam: Barrage
- Spillways: 47
- Spillway type: Radial gates

Panjnad Headworks is a gated barrage on the Panjnad River about twelve kilometres north of Uch Sharif in Bahawalpur Division, Punjab, Pakistan, situated just below the confluence of the Chenab River and the Sutlej River where the five rivers of historic Punjab merge. The barrage supplies irrigation water to Bahawalpur and Rahim Yar Khan districts through the Panjnad, Abbassia and Abbassia Link canals and also moderates flood flows at the tail end of the Chenab system.

== History ==
Panjnad Headworks construction began in 1927 under executive engineer James L. Roy and it was part of the British era Sutlej Valley Project. The barrage was originally designed with thirty three bays each 18.2 m wide but after the collapse of Islam Headworks in 1929 the design was revised to forty seven bays to improve flood safety. Work finished in two phases by May 1931 and the river was diverted over the weir on nineteen December 1931; formal opening followed in 1932 when the Bahawalpur state inaugurated the highway bridge that spans the gates.

In August 1973, inflow exceeded 22,653 cubic meters per second (m³/s) and authorities breached the left marginal bund to protect the gates, inundating large parts of Bahawalpur Division. Similar exceedances in 1976 and 1992 are documented in long-term discharge records compiled for the Asian Development Bank improvement project.

In August 2018, structural deterioration led to closure of the road bridge after inspectors declared it dangerous. The rebuilt dual-carriage bridge reopened on fourteen August 2020, restoring a key section of the national highway between Karachi and Lahore.

== Design and capacity ==
The original weir could pass about 19,821 cubic meters per second. A feasibility study in 2015 proposed enlarging the structure to forty seven operating bays and raising capacity to roughly 24,494 cubic meters per second at an estimated cost of Rs 18.158 billion financed by the Asian Development Bank. Major rehabilitation began in November 2018: three new spillways were added, canal head regulators were strengthened and climate resilience features were built into the foundations. Project documents list the ultimate design flood as eight hundred sixty five thousand cubic feet per second.

== Irrigation network ==
Two primary canals were taken off from the left bank when the barrage opened. The Panjnad Canal is 88.5 kilometers with a design capacity of 270 cubic meters per second irrigating about 588,817 hectares while the Abbassia Canal is 69 kilometers long designed for 29 cubic meters per second. The later Abbassia Link Canal enhances operational flexibility between the Sutlej and Chenab systems and is frequently used during shortages despite inter-provincial water-right disputes.

== Tourism ==
The headworks is a popular riverside picnic spot where visitors observe the merging waters of the five rivers that give Punjab its name, and the site features in regional folklore and Sufi poetry.
