= Yek Bhai =

Mountain in Pakistan

Yakbai Top (or Yek Bhai) is the highest peak in the Sulaiman Mountain in west of Dera Ghazi Khan District of Punjab, Pakistan. Located near Fort Munro and accessible from Sakhi Sarwar, it stands at an elevation of 7,400 feet above sea level. From its summit, it is possible to see both Punjab and Balochistan.
