= Ghazi University =

Public university in Pakistan

- Ghazi University Dg khan
- Other name: غازی یونیورسٹی
- Motto: Education for every one
- Type: Public
- Established: 2012
- Affiliations: Higher Education Commission (HEC)
- Endowment: Punjab funds
- Chancellor: Governor of the Punjab
- Vice-Chancellor: Prof. Dr. Ashfaq Ahmad Chattha Sahib
- Academic staff: 500+
- Administrative staff: 20+
- Students: 10000
- Undergraduates: 8000
- Postgraduates: 2000
- Location: City Campus, College Chowk, Dera Ghazi Khan-32200, Punjab, Pakistan
- Language: English Medium
- Colours: Blue, White
- Website: https://www.gudgk.edu.pk/

Ghazi University (Urdu: غازی یونیورسٹی) is a university in Dera Ghazi Khan, Punjab, Pakistan. The university was established in 2012 at the initiative of the Chief Minister of the Punjab Muhammad Shahbaz Sharif. It is named after Baloch leader Ghazi Khan.

In 2025, Nature published an article placing the university high among those with the largest amount of academic paper retractions as of 2024.

== History ==
In 1998, the University of Agriculture, Faisalabad opened its sub-campus as a college of agriculture at Dera Ghazi Khan. In 2004, Bahauddin Zakariya University also established its sub-campus there. On 11 July 2014 the College of Agriculture DG Khan, BZU Sub-campus, Postgraduate Degree College and Ghazi Medical College were given the status of Ghazi University Dera Ghazi Khan.

== Administration ==
The university has an administration office at City Campus.

== Departments ==
Currently there are four faculties and 21 departments working at Ghazi University:

Faculty of Agricultural Sciences

- Department of Agricultural Extension & Education
- Department of Agronomy [BSc (Hons) Agronomy; MSc (Hons) Agronomy & PhD Agronomy]
- Department of Horticulture [BSc (Hons) Horticulture; MSc (Hons) Horticulture]
- Department of Plant Breeding and Genetics [BSc (Hons) PBG; MSc (Hons) PBG]
- Department of Plant Protection [BSc (Hons) Agri. Entomology; MSc (Hons) Agri. Entomology]
- Department of Soil and Environmental Sciences [BSc (Hons) Soil and Environmental Sciences; MSc (Hons)Soil and Environmental Sciences]

Faculty of Arts

- Department of English (BS & MA English)
- Department of Islamic Studies (BS, MA Islamic Studies)
- Department of History and Pakistan Studies (BS & MA History; BS & MA Pakistan Studies)
- Department of Political Science (BS & MA Political Science)
- Department of Urdu (BS & MA Urdu)

Faculty of Management and Social Sciences

- Department of Business Administration (BBA, MBA, MS-BA)
- Department of Economics (BS & MSc Education)
- Department of Education (BS & MA Education)
- Department of Sociology (BS & MSc Sociology)

Faculty of Science

- Department of Botany [BS Botany; MSc Botany; MPhil/MS Botany]
- Department of Chemistry [BS Chemistry; MSc Chemistry]
- Department of Computer Science & IT [BSIT; MCS ]
- Department of Mathematics [BS Math; MSc Mtath]
- Department of Physics [BS Physics; MSc Physics]
- Department of Statistics [BS Statistics; MSc Statistics]
- Department of Zoology [BS Zoology; MSc Zoology; MPhil/MS Zoology]

Admissions: Online Admission system http://admission.gudgk.edu.pk/GhaziLoginfront.php

Programs are: BS (Hons) MBA, BBA (morning and evening), MBA Executive, MBA-IT, MCS, MSc Economics and MA English.

The campus has added a program of MSc Sociology. The Medical Science department has 50 teachers and 2,500 students. Ghazi Khan Medical College

== Facilities ==
The university is situated in the center of city near Pull Daat and College Chowk. There are two buildings at this university. One is at College Chowk, where students are recently studying and other is at Airport road. The campus at College road is called City Campus, and the campus at Airport Road is called Airport Campus. The airport campus is under construction.

The university has 1,189 acres of land in front of Airport. There are 185 classrooms, a 71-room administration block, five libraries, 39 laboratories, five hostels and seven sports grounds. There are more than 137,000 books and 464 journals in the five libraries.

The university has 6,500 students.
