= Fort Munro =

Hill station in Punjab, Pakistan

Fort Munro قلعہ منرو
- Hill station
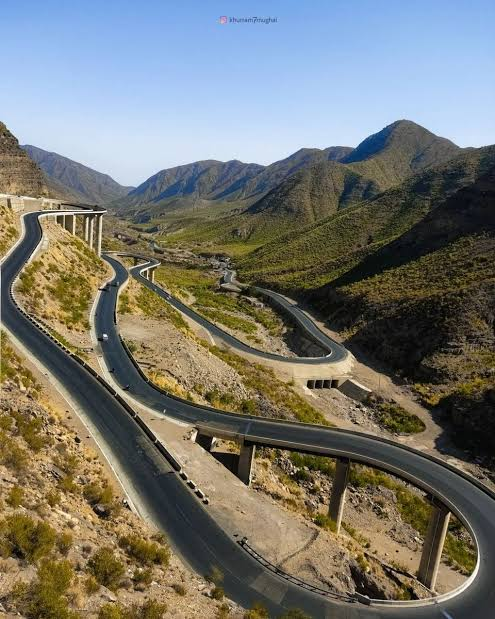
- Steel bridges of Fort Munro
- Interactive map of Fort Munro
- Coordinates: 29.9300°N 69.9848°E
- Country: Pakistan
- Province: (Punjab, Pakistan) Punjab
- District: Dera Ghazi Khan
- Elevation: 2,180 m (7,150 ft)
- Time zone: UTC+5 (PST)

Fort Munro (Note: Punjabi: منرو دا قلعہ, romanized: Manrō dā qil'ā; Urdu: قلعہ منرو, romanized: qil'a manro) is a hill station which is located at a height of 1,970 metres (6,470 ft) above sea level in Dera Ghazi Khan District of Punjab, Pakistan; along the Punjab–Balochistan border. It is part of the Sulaiman mountain range. It was developed by British government in late 19th century.

It attracts many people for short stays during the hot summer. It is around 85 kilometres from Dera Ghazi Khan city and about 185 kilometres from Multan in Sulaiman Mountain range. The people of Fort Munro are nomads, especially of the Leghari tribe.

Fort Munro's altitude is 1800 meters. Yakbai top and Mubarki top are other major tourist spots, located near Fort Munro where elevation reaches above 2000 meters. It can also be reached either from Loralai, (Balochistan) or from Dera Ghazi Khan (Punjab). From western side, the mountain range starts near Rakhni, which is a provincial border-post between Balochistan and Punjab.

== History ==
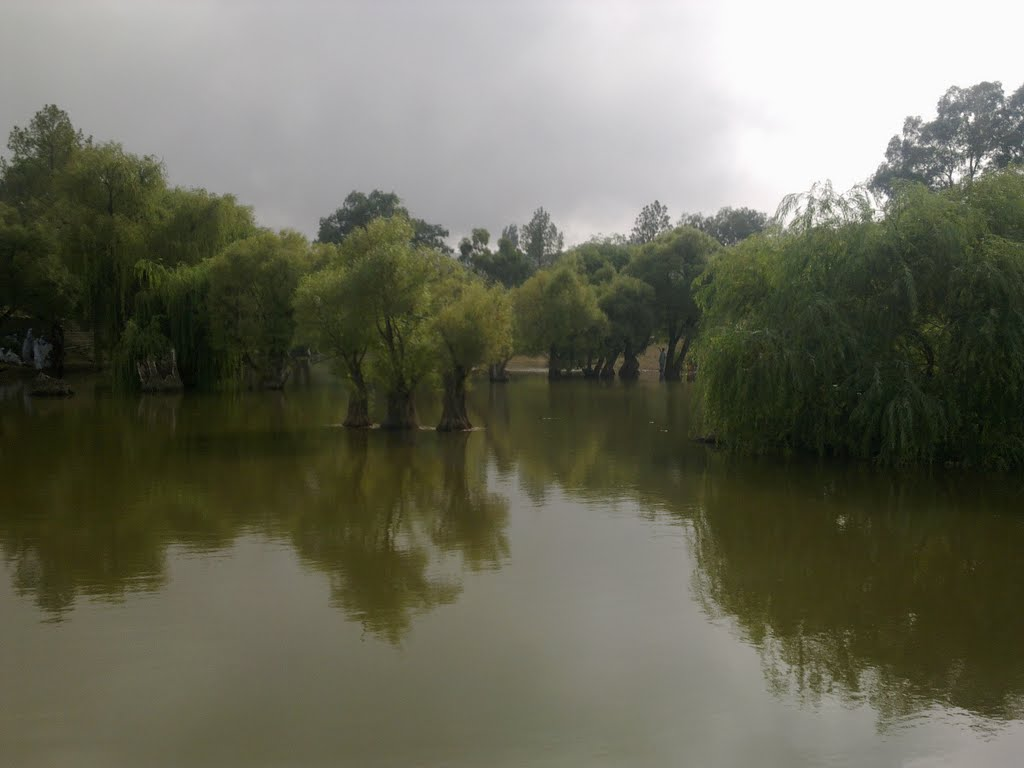
Dames Lake in Fort Munro where N.H. Smith drowned

The area was known as Tuman Leghari before the British became established there. The town was founded by Sir Robert Groves Sandeman in 1866 as a summer hill station. He named it after Colonel (later Major-General) Andrew Aldcorn Munro, a Scottish officer in the British Army who later became Commissioner and Superintendent of the Derajat Division and Multan Division.

Fort Munro served as headquarters of the Commissioner of Multan in the hot season during British administration. Sandeman Lodge, colonial residence of the political assistant, the Commissioner's House and the District Commission Office were built. A small Christian cemetery is also located near DCO House.

== Geography and climate ==
Fort Munro is part of the Sulaiman Mountain range. The range is located in central Pakistan, extending southward about 450 km from the Gumal Pass to just north of Jacobabad, separating the Khyber Pakhtunkhwa and Punjab from Balochistan. Its heights gradually decrease toward the south, with summits averaging 1,828 m (5,997 ft)– 2,133 m (6,998 ft), the highest being the twin peaks (48.2 km from the Gumal Pass) called Takht-i Sulaiman, or Solomon's Throne, which legend connects with King Solomon's visit to Pakistan; the higher of the peaks, at 5,633 m (18,481 ft), is the site of a Muslim Ziyarat (shrine) visited annually by many pilgrims. The range's eastern face dips steeply to the Indus River, but on the west the range declines more gradually. Juniper and edible pines abound in the north and olives in the centre, but vegetation is scarce in the south. The Ghat, Zao, Chuhar Khel Dhana, and Sakhi Sarwar are the principal passes in the north. In the south, west of Dera Ghazi Khan, lies the hill station of Fort Munro.

== Tourism ==
It attracts a number of tourists every year, particularly those who wish to escape from hot plains of southern Punjab to enjoy mild and pleasant weather for a day or two. The Punjab Government has released over Rs2 billion in July 2015 for the provision of basic facilities at the hill station in a bid to make it an important tourist haven. Out of the funds, Rs750 million would be spent on the installation of the chairlift and cable car facility between Fort Munro and Khar, Rs300 million on the provision of clean drinking water, Rs300 million on a wastewater treatment and drainage scheme, Rs1.60 billion on the construction of six new carpeted roads and a cadet college.

Additionally, state-of-the-art landscaping initiatives and the cultivation of cut flowers would also promote development in the region and open new avenues of employment. The Forest Department would afforest 300 acres in the hill station's vicinity. The Irrigation Department is also believed to have forwarded a proposal regarding the construction of six small dams in Fort Munro's vicinity. The development project, which is expected to kick off soon, to attract people from surrounding areas being the only hill station of southern Punjab in Dera Ghazi Khan district. Fort Munro is a cool resort in summers for the people living in south Punjab. Many ill people come here for refreshment or convalescence.

== See also ==
- Munroe Island, an inland island in Kerala, India is named after a different man, Maj-Gen. John Munro of Teaninich
- List of UNESCO World Heritage Sites in Pakistan
- List of forts in Pakistan
- List of museums in Pakistan
- Payala Lake Ghazi Ghat
- Sheikh Badin
