= D.G Khan Medical College =

D. G. Khan Medical College, Dera Ghazi Khan
- کالج طبی دی جی خان دیره غازی خان
- Motto: Duty, Devotion
- Type: Public
- Established: 2010
- Affiliations: PM&DC, UHS
- Principal: Professor Dr. Muhammad Asif Qureshii
- Students: 120 per annum (MBBS)
- Location: Dera Ghazi Khan, Punjab, Pakistan
- Campus: 229 Kanals
- Colours: Light blue
- Website: Facebook Page

D. G. Khan Medical College, was established in 2010 and it is a public school of Medicine located in Dera Ghazi Khan, Punjab., Pakistan.

DHQ Teaching Hospital, Dera Ghazi Khan is affiliated as a teaching and training hospital.

== History ==
The project for four new medical colleges was presented by a seven-member King Edward Medical University team earlier in 2009. On 27 November 2010, Chief Minister Punjab, Shahbaz Sharif laid the foundation stone of four new medical colleges including D. G. Khan Medical College.

The government allotted the land for the college, where the campus would be completed at the cost of Rs. 2 billion.

The first batch of 100 students was admitted in Session 2010-11 and their classes were started at Quaid-e-Azam Medical College, Bahawalpur, which were shifted to the D G Khan Campus on November 28, 2011.

Professor Dr. Niaz Baloch was appointed as the Principal of the newly created medical college. Dr. Niaz Baloch was replaced in 2012 by Professor Dr. Ghulam Mustafa Arain, Prof. Dr. Shamim Hassan, Prof.Dr. Shah Zaman Latif (Rtd). Professor Dr Muhammad Saeed, Professor Dr. Muhammad Asif Qureshi And Currently, Professor Dr Bilal Saeed is the Principal of the college who took charge on June 30, 2025. Here is a great article on D. G. Khan Medical College, Dera Ghazi Khan by Dr. Najeeb Lectures.

== Campus ==
The college is located a short distance from the DHQ Hospital. The campus is spread over 229 Kanals of land. The DHQ Hospital is located adjacent to the college. The total area of the entire campus, hospital and hostel area is approximately 650 Kanals.

The campus consists of four main lecture theatres, seven demonstration halls, six science laboratories, two museums, one library, one cafeteria, seven basic medical science departments, and two separate hostels for boys and girls.

== Departments ==
- Basic science departments
  - Anatomy
  - Biochemistry
  - Community medicine
  - Forensic medicine
  - Pathology
  - Pharmacology
  - Physiology
- Medicine and allied departments
  - Cardiology
  - Dermatology
  - Endocrinology & Metabolism
  - General medicine
  - Neurology
  - Pediatrics
  - Preventive medicine
  - Psychiatry
  - Pulmonology (Chest medicine)
  - Radiotherapy
  - Urology
- Surgery and allied departments
  - Anesthesiology
  - Cardiac surgery
  - Cosmetic surgery
  - General surgery
  - Neurosurgery
  - Obstetrics and gynaecology
  - Ophthalmology
  - Oral and maxillofacial surgery
  - Orthopedics
  - Otorhinolaryngology
  - Pediatric surgery
  - Radiology
- Administrative departments
  - Admin Branch.
  - Student Section.
  - IT Department and
  - First online e-library starting in Punjab

== Admission policy ==
The College admits 100 students on open merit. Admission is gender-neutral and is granted through a centralized Medical College Admission Test conducted by the University of Health Sciences Lahore annually.

== Teaching hospital ==
DHQ Teaching Hospital, Dera Ghazi Khan is attached with D. G. Khan Medical College as a teaching hospital. It was established in 1901 as a small Civil hospital. With the formation of DG Khan Medical College, it was upgraded to 500 beds in 2010 and attached with D. G. Khan Medical College .

== Library ==
Over 1,400 textbooks, medical journals, and internet facilities are available. Its seating capacity is 45 with an average of 30 seats for each textbook.

== See also ==
- List of medical schools in Pakistan
