= Indus River System Authority =

Pakistani government agency

IRSA
- Formation: 22 May 1992 (32 years ago)
- Type: Water monitoring and regulating among provinces
- Legal status: Active
- Headquarters: Islamabad, Pakistan
- Location: Pakistan: Khyber Pakhtunkhwa, Gilgit-Baltistan, Punjab, Balochistan, Sindh & Azad Kashmir
- Chairman: Sahibzada Muhammad Shabir
- Parent organization: Ministry of Water Resources
- Website: pakirsa.gov.pk

Indus River System Authority (IRSA) is a water regulator in Pakistan, established in 1992 as an act of Parliament.

The authority was established for regulating and monitoring the distribution of water resources of the Indus River system among the provinces, in accordance with provisions of the water accord. The Indus River System Authority oversees the allocation of water based on the seasonally available supplies. The Chairman of the authority is Sahibzada Muhammad Shabir.

== See also ==
- Indus Water Treaty (IWT), between India and Pakistan, suspended by India in 2025 after terror attacks
- 2025 Pahalgam attack
- India–Pakistan relations
- Indo-Pakistani water dispute of 1948
- Irrigation in India
- Rivers of Jammu and Kashmir
- Sapta Sindhu Rigvedic rivers of Punjab
- Water conflict
- Water politics
- 2025 India–Pakistan diplomatic crisis
