= Koh-e-Suleman Tehsil =

- Tehsil
- Country: Pakistan
- Region: (Punjab, Pakistan) Punjab
- District: Taunsa District

Area
  - Tehsil: 6,475 km^{2} (2,500 sq mi)

Population (2023)
  - Tehsil: 248,683
  - Density: 38.41/km^{2} (99.47/sq mi)
  - Urban: 0 (0.00%)
  - Rural: 248,683 (100%)

Literacy (2023)
  - Literacy rate: Total: (36.04%); Male: (51.53%); Female: (19.45%)
- Time zone: UTC+5 (PST)
  - Summer (DST): UTC+6 (PDT)

Koh-e-Suleman Tehsil, formerly known as De-Excluded Area D.G. Khan and D.G. Khan Tribal Area, is a tehsil located in Taunsa District, Punjab, Pakistan. The population is 248,683, according to the 2023 census. Barring a small Saraiki-speaking section, almost the entire population of the tehsil (97.7%) is Balochi-speaking.

== Demographics ==
=== Population ===
Historical population
Year	Pop.	±% p.a.
1951	41,406	—
1961	44,925	+0.82%
1972	59,296	+2.56%
1981	82,251	+3.70%
1998	126,198	+2.55%
2017	212,652	+2.78%
2023	248,683	+2.64%

As of the 2023 census, Koh-e-Suleman tehsil has population of 248,683. All of which lives in rural areas.

As of the 2023 census, Koh-e-Suleman Tehsil has a total literacy rate of 36.04%, with male literacy at 51.53% and female literacy at 19.45%.

=== Languages ===
Languages of Koh-e-Suleman, Pakistan
(2023 Census)
1. Balochi (97.7%)
2. Saraiki (2.00%)
3. other (0.30%)

== See also ==
- Tehsils of Pakistan
  - Tehsils of Punjab, Pakistan
