= Dera Ghazi Khan Tehsil =

Dera Ghazi Khan Tehsil تحصِيل ڈيره غازى خان
- Tehsil
- Country: Pakistan
- Region: (Punjab, Pakistan) Punjab
- District: Dera Ghazi Khan
- Capital: Dera Ghazi Khan
- Towns: 1
- Union councils: 41

Area
  - Tehsil: 1,457 km^{2} (563 sq mi)

Population (2023)
  - Tehsil: 1,443,409
  - Density: 990.7/km^{2} (2,566/sq mi)
  - Urban: 526,005 (36.45%)
  - Rural: 917,404 (63.55%)

Literacy
  - Literacy rate (2023): 47.25%
- Time zone: UTC+5 (PST)
  - Summer (DST): UTC+6 (PDT)

Dera Ghazi Khan (Urdu: تحصِيل ڈيره غازى خان), is an administrative subdivision (tehsil) of Dera Ghazi Khan District in the Punjab province of Pakistan. The capital of the tehsil is Dera Ghazi Khan.

== History ==
Dera Ghazi Khan Tehsil was created as a subdivision of Dera Ghazi Khan District during British rule. The population according to the 1901 census of India was 193,744, compared with 177,062 in 1891.

== Administration ==
The tehsil of Dera Ghazi Khan is administratively subdivided into 41 Union Councils, seven of which form the capital - Dera Ghazi Khan, the remaining 34 Unions are:

- Aaliwala
- Bahadur Garh
- Basti Fauja
- Basti Malana
- Bela union council
- Chhabri
- Choti Zareen
- Chotibala
- Churatta
- Darkhast Jamal Khan
- Drahma
- Gadai
- Ghaus Abad
- Haji Ghazi
- Jakhar Imam Shah
- Jhoke Uttra
- Kala
- Khakhi
- Kot Chutta
- Kot Haibat
- Kot Mubarak
- Mamoori
- Mana Ahmadani
- Mutafariq Chahan
- Nawan
- Notak
- Paigah
- Pir Adil
- Ramin
- Sakhi Sarwar
- Samina
- Shadan Lund
- Shah Sadar Din
- Wadore
- Yaroo

Basti Ahmadani

== Demography ==
=== Population ===
Historical population
Year	Pop.	±% p.a.
1951	237,786	—
1961	310,946	+2.72%
1972	464,679	+3.72%
1981	635,612	+3.54%
1998	1,151,236	+3.56%
2017	1,224,964	+0.33%
2023	1,443,409	+2.77%

As of the 2023 census, Dera Ghazi Khan tehsil has population of 1,443,409. Out of which, Urban population is 526,005 which is nearly 36.45% and rural population is 917,404.
