= Malik Sohrab Dodai =

Malik Sohrab Dodai was a Baloch mercenary who moved to Multan (Punjab) in the late 15th century with his father Mir Doda Khan at the behest of the Langah Sultanate dynasty. He was accompanied by his sons, Ghazi Khan, Fateh Khan, and Ismail Khan.

== Sources ==
- Glossary of the Tribes and Castes of the Punjab and North West Frontier Province. H. A. Rose, Ibbetson, Maclagan Published by Asian Educational Services, 1990 ISBN 81-206-0505-5, ISBN 978-81-206-0505-3
- The Baloch race. A historical and ethnological sketch. M. Longworth Dames. The Royal Asiatic Society, London, 1902.
