= Tonsa District =

Taunsa District ضِلع تونسہ
- District of Punjab
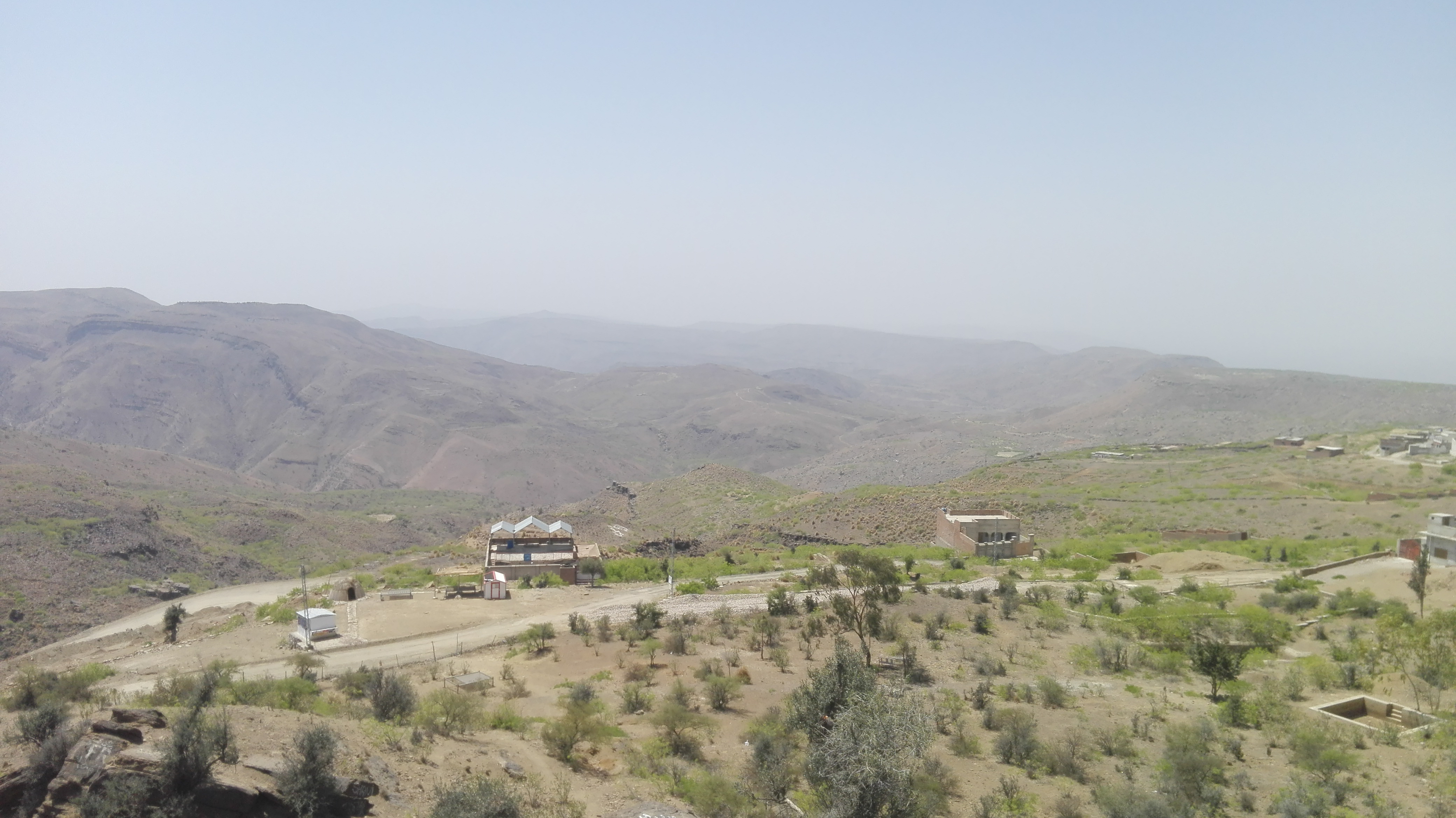
- Mountains viewed from Fort Munro

- Coordinates: 30°42′20″N 70°39′28″E
- Country: Pakistan
- Province: (Punjab, Pakistan) Punjab
- Division: Dera Ghazi Khan
- Union councils: 13
- Headquarters: Taunsa Sharif

Government
  - Type: District Administration
  - Deputy Commissioner: Muhammad Asghar Nawaz Banbhan
  - District Police Officer: N/A
  - District Health Officer: Dr. Muhammad Ahsan

Area
  - Total: 8,108 km^{2} (3,131 sq mi)

Population (2023)
  - Total: 1,045,460
  - Density: 128.9/km^{2} (334.0/sq mi)
- Time zone: UTC+5 (PST)
  - Summer (DST): UTC+6 (PDT)
- Post code: 32100
- Number of Tehsils: 3

Taunsa District (Urdu: ضلع تونسہ) is a district in the Punjab province of Pakistan. It was created in 2022 from part of Dera Ghazi Khan district, and was officially notified in 2024. It is situated on the bank of River Indus. It consists of three tehsils: Koh-e-Suleman, Taunsa and Vehowa.

The eastern part of district consists of fertile plains irrigated by River Indus and its canal systems, while the western half comprises mountains of Koh e Sulaiman range. It is mainly inhabited by Baloch people with Saraiki Speaking Baloch people making majority in plain areas whereas Balochi is main language in mountainous areas of District.

== History ==
The region around Tonsa district was an ancient settlement and remained a village or town earlier to 21st century. The region was conquered by Arab Umayyads in 8th century CE when Muhammad bin Qasim invaded Multan spreading Islam in the region. Tonsa remained part of Multan region in medieval era.

After Baloch Civil War in the 14th century Baloch tribes settled in waves in Tonsa and the adjoining mountain range. Tonsa Sharif was part of the Khanate of Kalat from 1717 to 1795, and later controlled by Afghans before being surrendered to the Sikh Empire in 1819. Sakhani (a Baloch tribe was ruler,who pledged allegiance to the Maharaja, before arrival of British rule which made them semi autonomous as part of British divide and rule policy.

== Demography ==
=== Population ===
Historical population
Year	Pop.	±% p.a.
1951	142,607	—
1961	161,654	+1.26%
1972	221,378	+2.90%
1981	308,051	+3.74%
1998	491,882	+2.79%
2017	890,437	+3.17%
2023	1,045,460	+2.71%

As of the 2023 census, Tonsa district has 161,806 households and a population of 1,045,460. The district has a sex ratio of 104.69 males to 100 females and a literacy rate of 53.05%: 64.59% for males and 40.81% for females. 353,488 (33.83% of the surveyed population) are under 10 years of age. 158,122 (15.12%) live in urban areas.

=== Religion ===
Religion in contemporary Tonsa District
Religious group	1941		2017		2023	
Religious group	Pop.	%	Pop.	%	Pop.	%
Islam	133,302	91.70%	890,172	99.97%	1,042,464	99.76%
Hinduism (Note: 1941 census: Including Ad-Dharmis)	12,019	8.27%	50	0.01%	28	~0%
Christianity	6	~0%	20	~0%	2,189	0.21%
Ahmadi	—N/a	—N/a	175	0.02%	216	0.02%
Others (Note: Including Jainism, Buddhism, Zoroastrianism, Judaism, or not stated)	36	0.03%	20	~0%	40	0.01%
Total Population	145,363	100%	890,437	100%	1,044,937	100%
Note: 1941 census data is for Tonsa and part of De-Excluded Area (then-named Biloch Trans-Frontier Tract) tehsil of erstwhile Dera Ghazi Khan District, which roughly corresponds to contemporary Tonsa district. Population corresponding to de-excluded area was computed based on population of area remaining in the district after the formation of Rajanpur district, with ratios of religions assumed to be the same. District and tehsil borders have changed since 1941.

=== Language ===
Languages of Tonsa District (2023)
1. Saraiki (66.8%)
2. Balochi (31.2%)
3. Pashto (1.19%)
4. Others (0.80%)

At the time of the 2023 census, 66.79% of the population spoke Saraiki, 31.18 Balochi and 1.19% Pashto as their first language.

== Administration ==
The district is administratively subdivided into three tehsils.

Tehsil	Area (km²)	Pop. (2023)	Density (ppl/km²) (2023)	Literacy rate (2023)	Union Councils
Koh-e-Suleman	5,339	248,683	46.58	36.04%	6
Tonsa	2,769	796,777	287.75	57.96%	68
Vehowa	...	...	...	...	...
