= Dera Ghazi Khan =

Dera Ghazi Khan ݙیرہ غازی خان (Saraiki)
- City
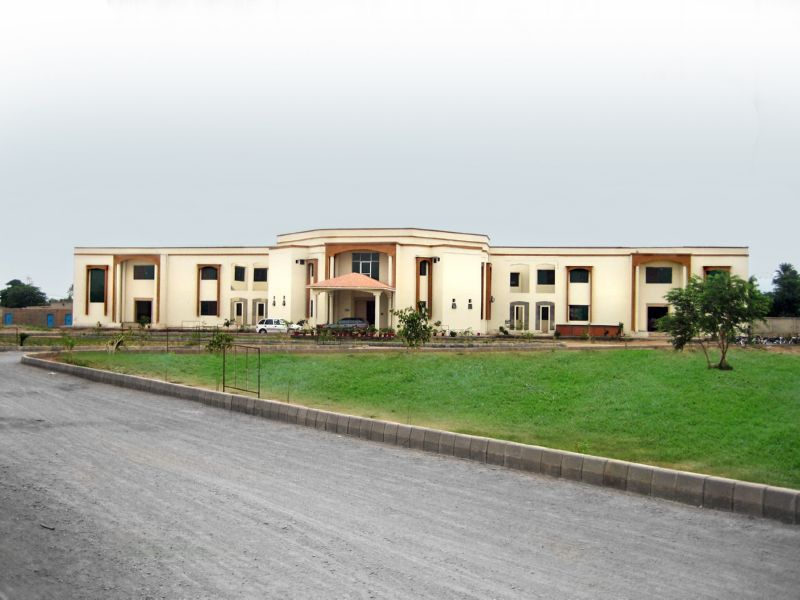
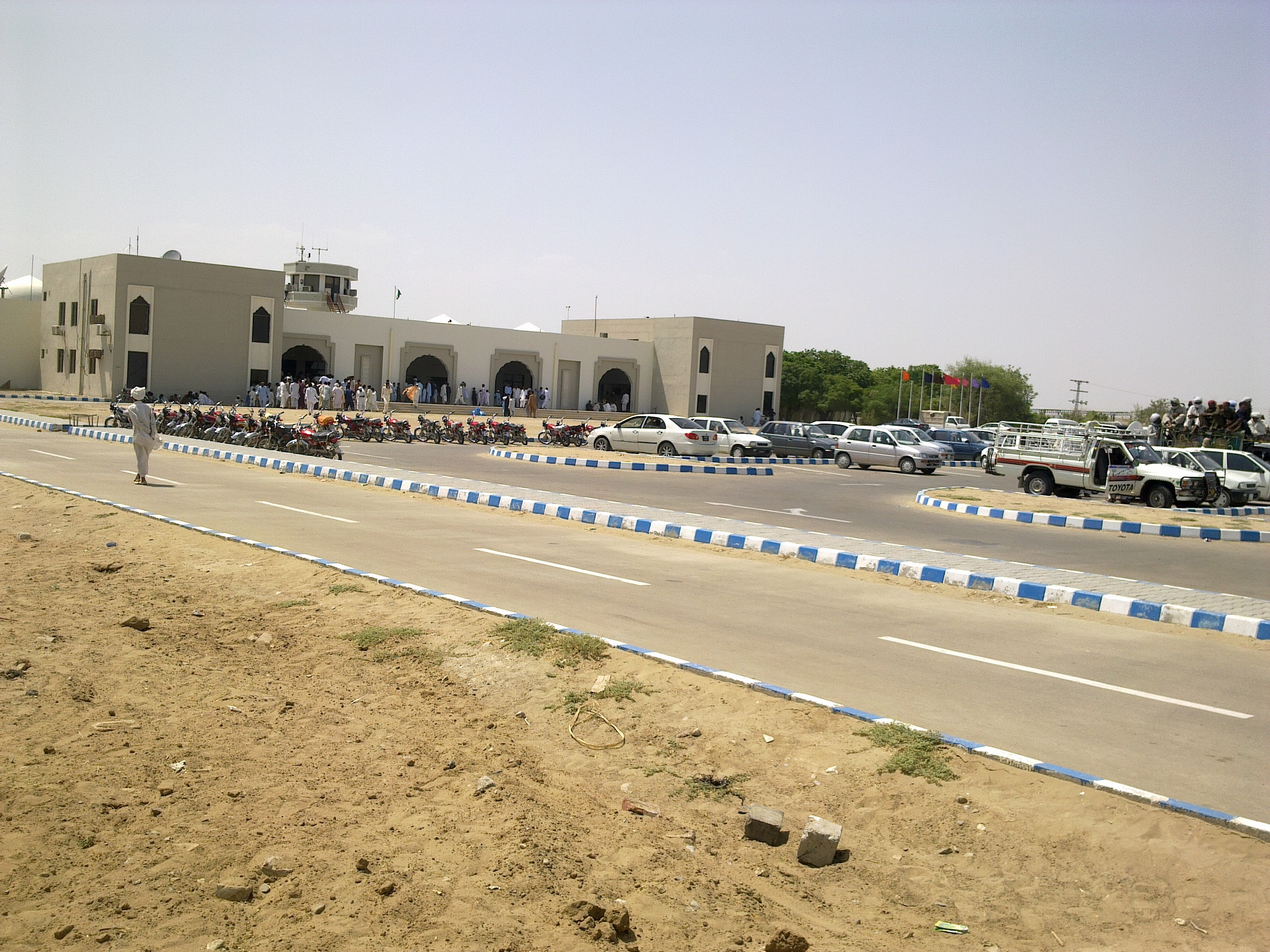
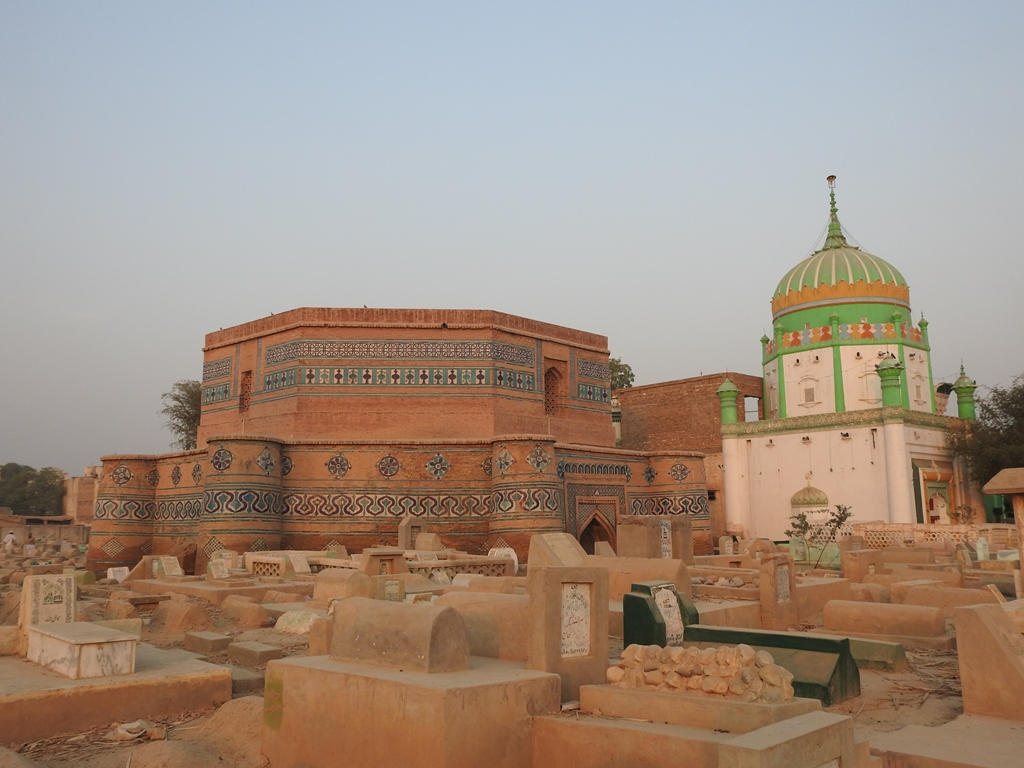
- Clockwise from top: Universal University Dera, Shrine of Ghazi Khan, for whom the city is named, Dera Ghazi Khan International Airport

- Location within Punjab, Pakistan Location within Pakistan
- Coordinates: 30°1′59″N 70°38′24″E
- Country: Pakistan
- Province: (Punjab, Pakistan) Punjab
- Region: Derajat
- Division: Dera Ghazi Khan
- District: Dera Ghazi Khan
- Tehsil: Dera Ghazi Khan
- Established: 1474; 552 years ago
- Foundation of New City: 1910

Government
  - Type: Municipal Corporation
  - Mayor: None (Vacant)

Area
  - City: 70 km^{2} (27 sq mi)
  - Metro: 11,294 km^{2} (4,361 sq mi)
- Elevation: 123 m (404 ft)

Population (2023)
  - City: 494,464
  - Rank: 23rd in Pakistan
  - Density: 7,100/km^{2} (18,000/sq mi)
- Time zone: UTC+5 (PST)
  - Summer (DST): +6
- Postal code: 32200
- Dialling code: 064
- Acronym: DGK
- Website: dgkhan.punjab.gov.pk

Dera Ghazi Khan, (Note: Punjabi/Urdu: ڈیرہ غازی خان) abbreviated as D. G. Khan, is a city in the southwestern part of Punjab, Pakistan. It is the 16th most-populous city in Punjab and the 23rd in Pakistan, as of 2023. Lying west of the Indus River in the region of Derajat, it serves as the headquarters of its eponymous district and division.

== History ==
=== Foundation ===
Dera Ghazi Khan is named after a Dodai chieftain Ghazi Khan, son of Haji Khan Mirani. It was founded at the end of the 15th century when Baloch tribes were invited to settle the region by Shah Husein, the second Langah Sultan of Multan. Rao Kelana, a powerful Bhati Rajput ruler of Pugal in the 15th century invaded Dera Ghazi Khan and defeated the Balochs. Dera Ghazi Khan was part of Multan province of the Mughal Empire between the 16th and 18th centuries.

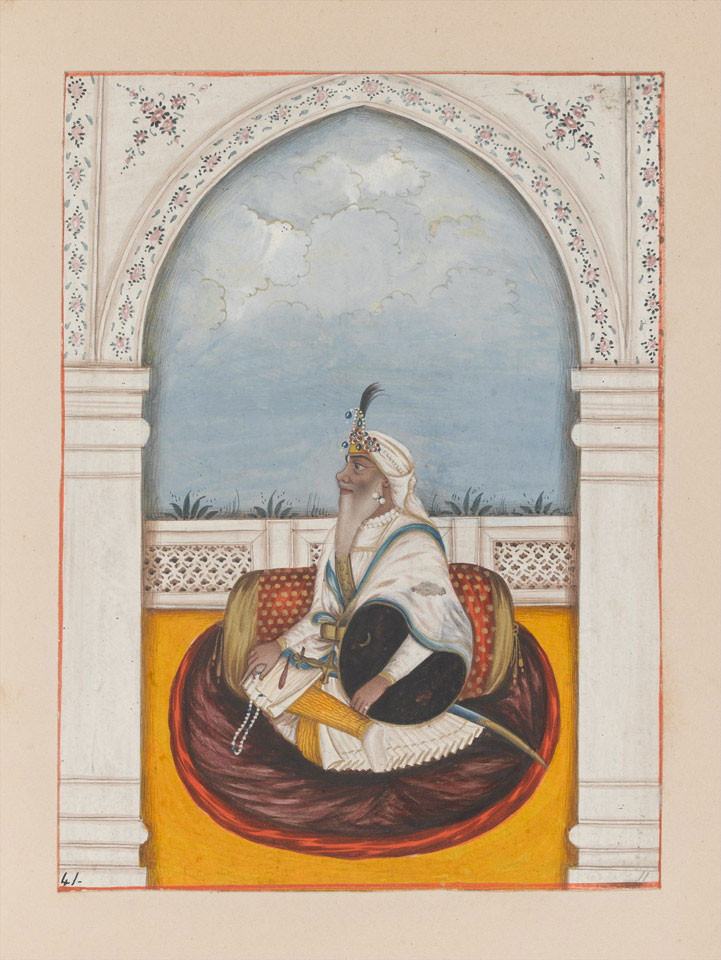
Khushal Singh Jamadar, Military Officer of Sikh Empire

Fifteen generations of Miranis ruled the area till the 19th century. In the beginning of the 19th century, Zaman Khan was the ruler of Dera Ghazi Khan under Kabul. ... The area remained under the rule of the Mirani chiefs for several generations.

In the mid-18th century, Mahmud Khan Gujjar (also spelled Muhmud or Mehmood) served as the de facto ruler of Dera Ghazi Khan from around 1738 to 1772. Punjab Government gazetteers credit him with founding the settlement of Mahmud Kot and initiating canal works in the region.

The city was taken by the Sikh army of Ranjit Singh in 1819.The area was invaded by the Sikh Army from Multan under the command of Khushal Singh, general of Ranjit Singh in 1819 and thus Dera Ghazi Khan came under the Sikh rule.

=== Post independence ===
After the success of the Pakistan Movement, which led to the independence of Pakistan in 1947, many Hindus and Sikhs migrated to India while many Muslim refugees from India settled down in the Dera Ghazi Khan District. Many Hindus and Sikhs from Dera Ghazi Khan settled in Delhi and founded Derawal Nagar along with the migrants from Dera Ismail Khan.

== Geography and climate ==
Dera Ghazi Khan is located at 30'03" N and 70'38" E. The overall climate of the city is semi arid. The winter is mild and dry, but it is very hot and rainy in summer. The average high during summer is about 42 °C (107 °F), while during winter the average low is 4 °C (40 °F). The prevailing wind direction is north–south. Due to the barren mountains of Koh-Suleman and the sandy soil of the area, windstorms are common in the summer. During summer, the temperatures are generally amongst the highest in Pakistan. Fort Munro, located on the edge of Punjab province, has relatively cooler weather. In winter, scattered snowfall has been reported in high elevated areas of Koh e Sulaiman.

Climate data for Dera Ghazi Khan
Month	Jan	Feb	Mar	Apr	May	Jun	Jul	Aug	Sep	Oct	Nov	Dec	Year
Record high °C (°F)	25.0 (77.0)	30.0 (86.0)	35.0 (95.0)	38.0 (100.4)	42.0 (107.6)	46.0 (114.8)	44.0 (111.2)	42.0 (107.6)	40.0 (104.0)	38.0 (100.4)	32.0 (89.6)	22.0 (71.6)	46.0 (114.8)
Mean daily maximum °C (°F)	20.3 (68.5)	22.1 (71.8)	26.9 (80.4)	33.5 (92.3)	38.7 (101.7)	41.5 (106.7)	38.5 (101.3)	37.4 (99.3)	36.7 (98.1)	33.4 (92.1)	27.7 (81.9)	21.9 (71.4)	31.5 (88.8)
Daily mean °C (°F)	12.2 (54.0)	14.7 (58.5)	19.9 (67.8)	26.0 (78.8)	30.9 (87.6)	34.2 (93.6)	32.7 (90.9)	31.9 (89.4)	30.2 (86.4)	25.3 (77.5)	19.1 (66.4)	13.6 (56.5)	24.2 (75.6)
Mean daily minimum °C (°F)	4.2 (39.6)	7.3 (45.1)	12.9 (55.2)	18.5 (65.3)	23.1 (73.6)	26.8 (80.2)	26.9 (80.4)	26.4 (79.5)	23.8 (74.8)	17.3 (63.1)	10.5 (50.9)	5.3 (41.5)	16.9 (62.4)
Record low °C (°F)	−2.2 (28.0)	−2.0 (28.4)	4.0 (39.2)	9.5 (49.1)	14.4 (57.9)	17.5 (63.5)	18.6 (65.5)	19.5 (67.1)	15.8 (60.4)	8.0 (46.4)	2.2 (36.0)	−2.8 (27.0)	−2.8 (27.0)
Average precipitation mm (inches)	10.0 (0.39)	17.5 (0.69)	34.8 (1.37)	11.7 (0.46)	7.2 (0.28)	48.4 (1.91)	99.9 (3.93)	97.5 (3.84)	67.6 (2.66)	4.8 (0.19)	2.1 (0.08)	19.8 (0.78)	421.3 (16.58)
Mean monthly sunshine hours	222.2	206.8	234.3	259.2	290.1	247.7	241.3	261.1	271.1	283.2	249.7	220.4	2,987.1
Source: NOAA (1961–1990)

== Civic administration ==
Dera Ghazi Khan Municipal Corporation is administratively subdivided into seven Union Councils. The city is also the headquarters of Dera Ghazi Khan District and administrative capital of Dera Ghazi Khan Division.

== Education ==
=== Colleges ===
- Ghazi University is a university in Dera Ghazi Khan, Punjab, Pakistan. The university was established in 2012 on the initiative of the Chief Minister of the Punjab Muhammad Shahbaz Sharif. It is named after Baloch mercenary Ghazi Khan. The university is situated in the center of city near Pull Daat and College chock. Since its inception, GU has been operated only on additional charge basis. Prof. Dr. Muhammad Tufail (TI) assumed the charge as a permanent Vice Chancellor (VC), on Sept. 18, 2018. Major infrastructure and development process started in the university in 2018.
- Mir Chaker Khan Rind University of Technology MCUT is public sector Engineering University providing Engineering education in various discipline of Technology. It is necessary in public interest to make provisions for the establishment of Mir Chakar Khan Rind University of Technology in Dera Ghazi Khan to promote research and development for purposes of producing high quality technical human resource to cope with the present day requirements.
- College of Agriculture, DG Khan Sub-Campus University of Agriculture, Faisalabad. (CADGK)
- Indus International Institute: It is affiliated with National College of Business Administration and Economics has been established by private sector. For the needs of remote area students, the institute has its own buses to facilitate the transport availability for the students. Indus institute has a library and Computer Lab as well.

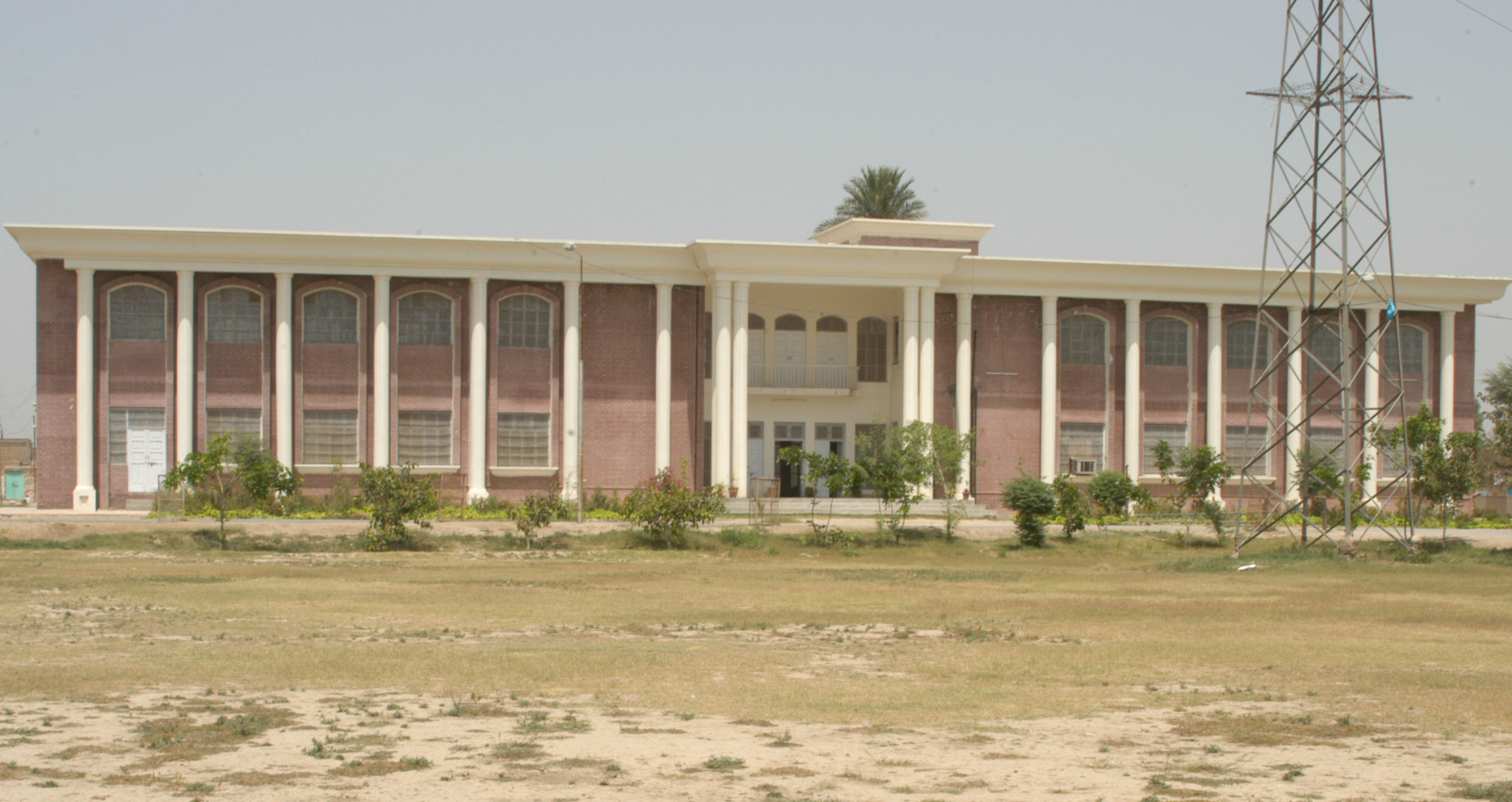
University of Education, Dera Ghazi Khan campus

- The College of Education: It was established in 1989 under the affiliation of Bahauddin Zakariya University, Multan. The college became a constituent institution of the University of Education in 2002 and is in its new building adjacent to the Shah Faisal (Bihari) Colony. The campus has a hostel for boys and one for girls. The campus offers teacher education programs like BEd Secondary, MEd, M.A. Education and B.A. BEd's. Several private sector colleges also exist in this city.
- Ghazi Khan Medical College: The government decided to establish a medical college in Dera Ghazi Khan to improve the facilities in southern part of the province. Ghazi Khan Medical College classes were started in 2010 in Q.M.C Bahawapur. The foundation stone for Ghazi University and Dera Ghazi Khan Medical College was laid in December 2011. Classes shifted from Q.M.C Bahawalpur to Ghazi Khan Medical College in March 2012. Niaz Ahmed Baloch was appointed as a first principal of the Medical College.
- The Medical and Dental College has been developed as a state-of-the-art medical institution imparting accredited and approved medical education and research. The D.H. Hospital and Research Institute, which will be a research-oriented teaching hospital, will fulfill the requirement of training and research of medical students. The curriculum of the Medical and Dental College will be in line with the PM&DC regulations and international health standards.

Technology and specialization

- UAF College of Agriculture, Dera Ghazi Khan: It is a constituent college of the University of Agriculture Faisalabad located near the airport imparts training in the degree of BSc (Hons.) Agriculture. The college consists of teaching sections of Plant Breeding and Genetics, Horticulture, Agronomy, Soil and Forestry Range Management and Wildlife, Agricultural Entomology, Plant Pathology, Animal Production and Health, Agricultural Engineering and Technology, and Social Sciences and Rural Development. It aims to develop as a university.

=== Universities ===
The government has established a state-of-the-art Ghazi University in Dera Ghazi Khan since 2011 near airport. For this purpose 404.6 ha (1,000 acres) of land has been acquired for the next 50 years requirement of the university. The foundation stone for Ghazi University and Ghazi Medical College was laid in December 2011. The Govt. Postgraduate College, FAU Agriculture College and Ghazi Medical College will work under this university. Vice Chancellor of Islamia University Bahawalpur Dr. Mukhtar Ahmed has given additional charge of Ghazi University v.c since 11.06.2014. The Virtual University of Pakistan has established its campus here since 2004 which is providing both campus-based and distance learning education primarily based on IT tools and technology. Another prominent educational organisation is the Allama Iqbal Open University campus. The government has approved Akhuwat University of Engineering and Technology in Dera Ghazi Khan since 2012.. Mir Chaker Khan Rind University of Technology.

== Demographics ==
Based on the surveys of 2004–2005, Dera Ghazi Khan district is considered one of the twenty poorest districts of Pakistan with about 51% of its population living below the poverty line.

=== Population ===
Historical populations of Dera Ghazi Khan city.

Historical population

Year	Pop.	±% p.a.
1951	35,909	—
1961	47,105	+2.75%
1972	72,343	+3.98%
1981	102,007	+3.89%

Year	Pop.	±% p.a.
1998	190,542	+3.74%
2017	399,064	+3.97%
2023	494,464	+3.64%

=== Religion ===
Religion in the city of Dera Ghazi Khan
Religion	Population (1901)	Percentage (1901)	Population (1941)	Percentage (1941)
Islam	13,295	55.7%	18,810	58.53%
Hinduism (Note: 1941 census: Including Ad-Dharmis)	9,988	41.84%	12,989	40.42%
Sikhism	165	0.69%	157	0.49%
Jainism	143	0.6%	106	0.33%
Christianity	140	0.59%	37	0.12%
Others	—N/a	—N/a	40	0.12%
Total	23,871	100%	32,139	100%

=== Languages ===
Languages of Dera Ghazi Khan City (2023)
1. Saraiki (81.2%)
2. Urdu (12.4%)
3. Balochi (4.65%)
4. Punjabi (1.04%)
5. Others (0.72%)

According to the 2023 Census of Pakistan, Dera Ghazi Khan City is overwhelmingly Saraiki-speaking, with Saraiki spoken by 81.19% of the population. Urdu forms the largest minority language at 12.40%, Balochi speakers account for 4.65%, while Punjabi makes up 1.04% of the population and an additional 0.72% of the population consists of other languages of Pakistan (mostly Pashto and Kashmiri). (Note: Data taken from the urban part of Dera Ghazi Khan Tehsil, which includes Dera Ghazi Khan MC and Shadan Lund TC)

=== Airport ===
Dera Ghazi Khan International Airport is located near the city. It carries both domestic and International Flights.

== Culture ==
=== Fairs and festivals ===
- Sangh Mela, is a Vaisakhi fair during March and April, and has been celebrated in Sakhi Sarwar by people coming from Jhang and Faisalabad for centuries. This festival is celebrated by Hindus and Muslims, especially at the time of wheat harvesting. In some places it is known as Basant. Throughout history, a large number of followers coming from different religions became the followers of Sakhi Sarwar. Max Arthur Macauliffe, a colonial office appointed in Punjab, observed in 1875 that not only Muslims but Hindus also visited the shrines during the urs. In the 1911 census of India, 79,085 Sikhs reported to be followers of Sakhi Sarwar.

=== Cuisine ===
- Sohan Halwa is a traditional sweet made by boiling a mixture of water, sugar, milk, and wheat flour (coarse pieces)/cornflour until it becomes solid.

== Notable people ==
- Farooq Leghari, former President of Pakistan
- Usman Buzdar, Former Chief Minister of Punjab
- Asif Saeed Khosa, former Chief Justice of Pakistan
- Latif Khosa, former Governor of Punjab
- Zulfiqar Ali Khosa, former Governor of Punjab
- Nasir Khosa, former Chief Secretary of Punjab
- Awais Ahmed Leghari, former Federal Minister
- Zartaj Gul, Former Federal Minister
- Niaz Ahmad Akhtar (Pakistani academic)
- Mohsin Naqvi (Poet)
- Prabhu Chawla (Journalist)
- Tauqeer Nasir (Actor)
- Imran Rafiq (Pakistani cricketer)

== Press and media ==
Daily Jang is published from Dera Ghazi Khan along with many local newspapers in Urdu, Saraiki and Balochi languages. The Daily Kasak is also published in the city.

== Bibliography ==
- "How Pakistan Made Nuclear Fuel" by Munir Ahmad Khan, former chairperson of the Pakistan Atomic Energy Commission: Islamabad The Nation 7 February 1998, page 7 [Pakistan: Article on How Pakistan Made Nuclear Fuel: FBIS-NES-98-042 : 11 February 1998].
