= Dera Ghazi Khan District =

District of Punjab, Pakistan

Coordinates: 29°50′N 70°30′E

Dera Ghazi Khan District ضلع دیرہ غازی خان
- District of Punjab
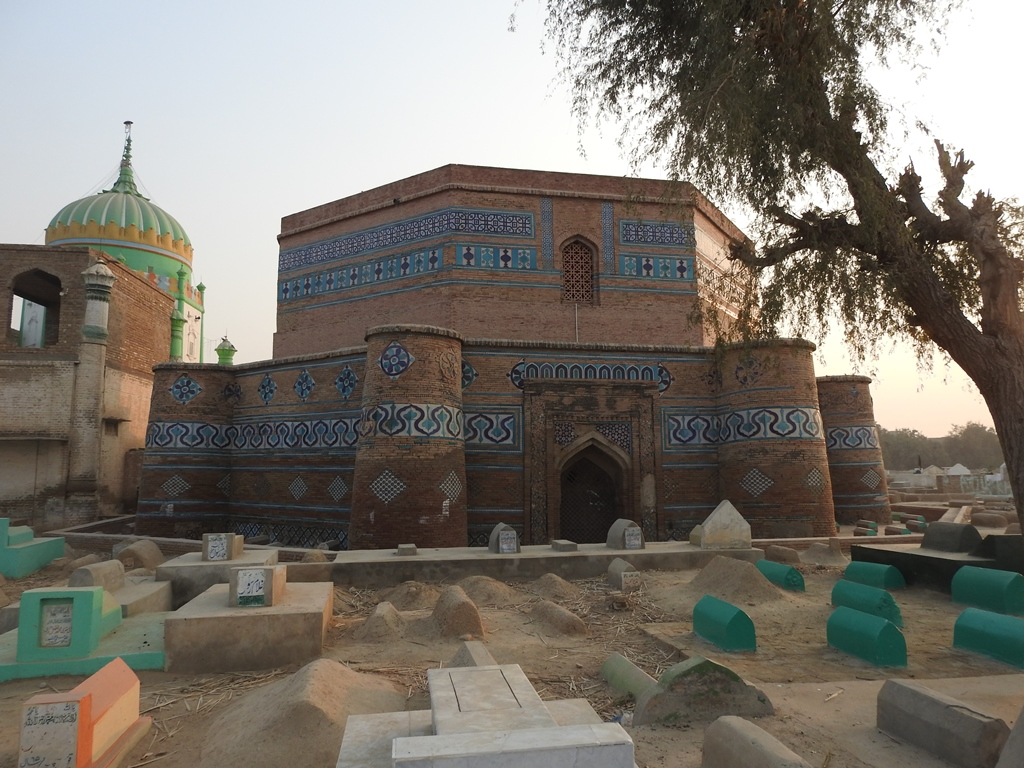
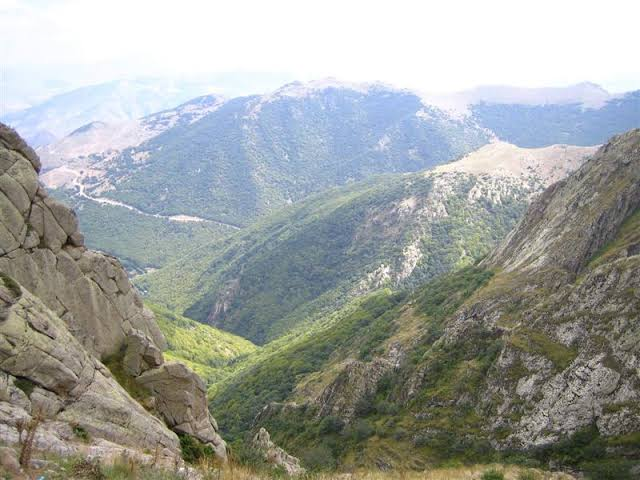
- Top to bottom: Shrine of Mullah Qaid Shah, Hills of Fort Munro.

- Map of Dera Ghazi Khan District
- Country: Pakistan
- Province: (Punjab, Pakistan) Punjab
- Division: Dera Ghazi Khan
- Headquarters: Dera Ghazi Khan

Government
  - Type: District Administration
  - Deputy Commissioner: Sardar Abdullah Dasti
  - District Police Officer: N/A
  - District Health Officer: N/A

Area
  - District of Punjab: 3,814 km^{2} (1,473 sq mi)

Population (2023)
  - District of Punjab: 2,348,245
  - Density: 615.7/km^{2} (1,595/sq mi)
  - Urban: 585,875 (24.95%)
  - Rural: 1,762,370 (75.05%)

Literacy
  - Literacy rate: Total: (43.98%); Male: (47.78%); Female: (35.64%)
- Time zone: UTC+5 (PST)
- Area code: 064
- Number of Tehsils: 3
- Website: dgkhan.punjab.gov.pk

Dera Ghazi Khan (Urdu: ضلع ڈيره غازى خان, Punjabi: ضلع دیرہ غازی خان) is a district in Punjab, Pakistan. Its administrative capital is Dera Ghazi Khan.

The district lies to the west of the Indus River. The Sulaiman Mountains rise to a height of 10,000 feet (3,000 m) in the north of the district. Popular tourist destinations are Fort Munro, Yakbai Hill station and Mubarki Top.

== Administration ==
The district is divided into Three tehsils which are divided into a total of sixty Union Councils:

Tehsil	Area (km²)	Pop. (2023)	Density (ppl/km²) (2023)	Literacy rate (2023)	Union Councils
Dera Ghazi Khan	2,012	1,443,409	717.40	47.25%	41
Kot Chutta	1,802	904,836	502.13	38.61%	24
De-excluded Area DG Khan Tehsil					

== History ==
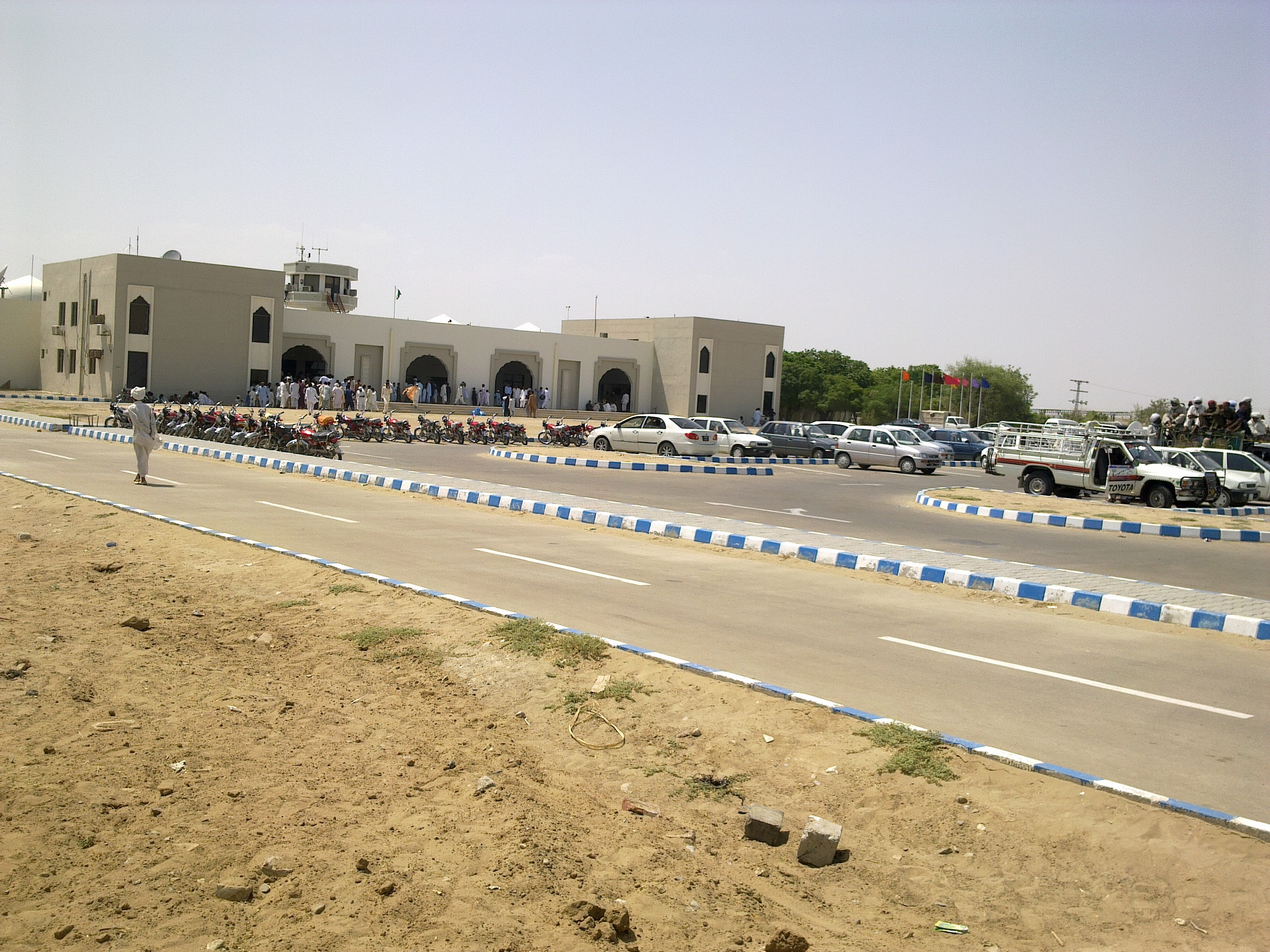
Dera Ghazi Khan International Airport

The region around Dera Ghazi Khan was inhabited by Mallian people in late antiquity. Then it was part of the wider Multan region. Buddhist artifacts dating to the 1st to 3rd centuries CE have been found in Dillu Roy in Kot Chhutta tehsil.

The town of Dera Ghazi Khan was founded at the close of the 15th century and named after Nawab Ghazi Khan Mirani, son of Nawab Haji Khan Mirani, the city was founded when Shah Hussain of the Langah Sultanate of Multan invited the Baloch people to settle the region. Together with two other Deras i.e. settlements, Dera Ismail Khan and Dera Fateh Khan, it gave its name to Derajat. Derajat eventually came into the possession of the British after the Sikh War in 1849 and was divided into two districts: Dera Ghazi Khan and Dera Ismail Khan. Dera Ghazi Khan district was annexed by the British from its former Sikh rulers after the Second Anglo-Sikh War of 1848–1849. After the independence, many of the city's Hindu residents settled in Derawal Nagar colony of Delhi, India. The district of Rajanpur was later carved out of the Dera Ghazi Khan district.

Based on the surveys of 2004–2005, Dera Ghazi Khan district is considered one of the 20 poorest districts of Pakistan with about 51% of its population living under the poverty line.

== Demographics ==
Historical population
Year	Pop.	±% p.a.
1951	380,393	—
1961	472,600	+2.19%
1972	686,057	+3.45%
1981	943,663	+3.61%
1998	1,643,118	+3.32%
2017	2,872,631	+2.98%
2023	3,393,705	+2.82%
Sources: Note: Includes present Taunsa district, which has since become a separate district

As of the 2023 census, residual Dera Ghazi Khan district has 292,658 households and a population of 2,348,245. The district has a sex ratio of 100.71 males to 100 females and a literacy rate of 43.98%: 47.78% for males and 35.64% for females. 797,634 (34.06% of the surveyed population) are under 10 years of age. 649,290 (27.65%) live in urban areas.

=== Religion ===
As per the 2023 census, the vast majority of the population was Muslim and made up nearly the entire population with 99.62%. Christians made up the largest minority (0.30%), followed by Ahmadis (0.07%) with Hindus and Sikhs making up the rest.

Religion in contemporary Dera Ghazi Khan District
Religious group	1941		2017		2023	
Religious group	Pop.	%	Pop.	%	Pop.	%
Islam	192,278	85.94%	1,979,213	99.85%	2,332,785	99.62%
Hinduism	31,052	13.88%	198	0.01%	138	~0%
Christianity	37	0.02%	310	0.02%	6,946	0.30%
Ahmadiyya	—N/a	—N/a	2,371	0.12%	1,607	0.07%
Others	368	0.16%	102	~0%	162	0.01%
Total Population	223,735	100%	1,982,194	100%	2,341,638	100%
Note: 1941 census data is for Dera Ghazi Khan tehsil of erstwhile Dera Ghazi Khan district, which roughly corresponds to contemporary Dera Ghazi Khan district. District and tehsil borders have changed since 1941.

Religious groups in Dera Ghazi Khan District (British Punjab province era)
Religious group	1881		1891		1901		1911		1921		1931		1941	
Religious group	Pop.	%	Pop.	%	Pop.	%	Pop.	%	Pop.	%	Pop.	%	Pop.	%
Islam	315,240	86.76%	349,587	86.52%	412,012	87.45%	442,234	88.47%	411,431	87.72%	432,911	88.16%	512,678	88.19%
Hinduism (Note: 1931-1941: Including Ad-Dharmis)	46,697	12.85%	52,903	13.09%	57,815	12.27%	56,485	11.3%	56,346	12.01%	57,217	11.65%	67,407	11.59%
Sikhism	1,326	0.36%	1,424	0.35%	1,027	0.22%	1,042	0.21%	932	0.2%	760	0.15%	1,072	0.18%
Christianity	82	0.02%	117	0.03%	152	0.03%	76	0.02%	47	0.01%	31	0.01%	87	0.01%
Jainism	0	0%	0	0%	143	0.03%	23	0%	296	0.06%	125	0.03%	106	0.02%
Zoroastrianism	0	0%	0	0%	0	0%	0	0%	0	0%	0	0%	0	0%
Buddhism	0	0%	0	0%	0	0%	0	0%	0	0%	0	0%	0	0%
Judaism	—N/a	—N/a	0	0%	0	0%	0	0%	0	0%	0	0%	0	0%
Others	1	0%	0	0%	0	0%	0	0%	0	0%	0	0%	0	0%
Total population	363,346	100%	404,031	100%	471,149	100%	499,860	100%	469,052	100%	491,044	100%	581,350	100%
Note: British Punjab province era district borders are not an exact match in the present-day due to various bifurcations to district borders — which since created new districts — throughout the historic Punjab Province region during the post-independence era that have taken into account population increases.

Religion in the Tehsils of Dera Ghazi Khan District (1921)
Tehsil	Islam		Hinduism		Sikhism		Christianity		Jainism		Others (Note: Including Buddhism, Zoroastrianism, Judaism, Tribals, others, or not stated)		Total	
Tehsil	Pop.	%	Pop.	%	Pop.	%	Pop.	%	Pop.	%	Pop.	%	Pop.	%
Dera Ghazi Khan Tehsil	167,687	86.53%	25,272	13.04%	507	0.26%	27	0.01%	296	0.15%	0	0%	193,789	100%
Sanghar Tehsil	74,548	87.95%	10,207	12.04%	4	0%	0	0%	0	0%	0	0%	84,759	100%
Rajanpura Tehsil	94,148	89.66%	10,444	9.95%	415	0.4%	1	0%	0	0%	0	0%	105,008	100%
Jampur Tehsil	75,048	87.78%	10,423	12.19%	6	0.01%	19	0.02%	0	0%	0	0%	85,496	100%
Note: British Punjab province era tehsil borders are not an exact match in the present-day due to various bifurcations to tehsil borders — which since created new tehsils — throughout the historic Punjab Province region during the post-independence era that have taken into account population increases.

Religion in the Tehsils of Dera Ghazi Khan District (1941)
Tehsil	Islam		Hinduism		Sikhism		Christianity		Jainism		Others (Note: Including Anglo-Indian Christians, British Christians, Buddhism, Zoroastrianism, Judaism, Tribals, others, or not stated)		Total	
Tehsil	Pop.	%	Pop.	%	Pop.	%	Pop.	%	Pop.	%	Pop.	%	Pop.	%
Dera Ghazi Khan Tehsil	192,278	85.94%	31,052	13.88%	221	0.1%	37	0.02%	106	0.05%	41	0.02%	223,735	100%
Sanghar Tehsil	97,234	89.08%	11,875	10.88%	34	0.03%	6	0.01%	0	0%	0	0%	109,149	100%
Rajanpura Tehsil	122,849	90.18%	12,591	9.24%	791	0.58%	0	0%	0	0%	0	0%	136,231	100%
Jampur Tehsil	100,317	89.38%	11,889	10.59%	26	0.02%	3	0%	0	0%	0	0%	112,235	100%
Note1: British Punjab province era tehsil borders are not an exact match in the present-day due to various bifurcations to tehsil borders — which since created new tehsils — throughout the historic Punjab Province region during the post-independence era that have taken into account population increases. Note2: Tehsil religious breakdown figures for Christianity only includes local Christians, labeled as "Indian Christians" on census. Does not include Anglo-Indian Christians or British Christians, who were classified under "Other" category.

=== Languages ===
Languages of Dera Ghazi Khan district (2023)
1. Saraiki (82.9%)
2. Balochi (12.7%)
3. Urdu (3.40%)
4. Others (1.02%)

At the time of the 2023 census, 82.90% of the population spoke Saraiki, 12.68% Balochi and 3.40% Urdu as their first language.

== Notable people ==
- Zartaj Gul, Former Minister and Member National assembly, senior member PTI
- Hafiz Abdul Kareem, Former Senator and Federal Minister
- Khosa family
  - Zulfiqar Ali Khosa, Former Governor of Punjab
  - Dost Muhammad Khosa, Former caretaker Chief Minister of Punjab
- Leghari family, feudal and political family
  - Farooq Leghari, former President of Pakistan
  - Awais Leghari, Senior member PML(N), Federal Minister for Energy
  - Jamal Leghari, Former MPA Punjab assembly
  - Muhammad Ahmad Khan Leghari, MPA

== See also ==
- Dera Ghazi Khan
- Dera Ghazi Khan Division
- Ghazi University
- Dera Ghazi Khan railway station
- Sulaiman Mountains
- Districts of Pakistan
- Punjab, Pakistan
- Kotri–Attock Line
- Basti Azeem
- Payala Lake Ghazi Ghat
