= PP-204 Sahiwal-VII =

Constituency of the Punjabi Provincial Legislature, Pakistan

- Constituency for the Provincial Assembly of Punjab
- Region: Chichawatni Tehsil (partly) including Iqbal Nagar Town of Sahiwal District

Current constituency
- Created from: PP-226 Sahiwal-VII (2002-2018); PP-202 Sahiwal-VII (2018-2023)

PP-204 Sahiwal-VII (پی پی-204، ساہيوال-7) is a Constituency of Provincial Assembly of Punjab.

== General elections 2024 ==
Provincial election 2024: PP-204 Sahiwal-VII
Party	Candidate	Votes	%	±%
Independent	Muhammad Ghulam Sarwar (Note: Filed nomination papers as PTI candidate but ECP allowed him to run as an Independent)	60,438	42.86	
Independent	Adil Saeed Choudhry	33,722	23.91	
IPP	Muhammad Falak Sher Langrial	23,522	16.68	
Independent	Shahid Munir	10,059	7.13	
TLP	Umair Saleem	6,200	4.40	
Independent	Muhammad Usman Sarwar	2,228	1.58	
Others	Others (eleven candidates)	4,849	3.44	
Turnout		143,718	57.58	
Total valid votes		141,018	98.12	
Rejected ballots		2,700	1.88	
Majority		26,716	18.95	
Registered electors		249,599		
hold				

== General elections 2018 ==
Provincial election 2018: PP-202 Sahiwal-VII
Party	Candidate	Votes	%	±%
PTI	Malik Nauman Ahmad Langrial	57,540	50.83	
PML(N)	Ch. Shahid Munir	44,349	39.18	
PPP	Ch. Muhammad Mansha Rizwan	5,026	4.44	
AAT	Muhammad Daood Urf Alqasim	2,019	1.78	
Independent	Nazeer Anmad	1,544	1.36	
Others	Others (five candidates)	2,727	2.40	
Turnout		115,293	58.71	
Total valid votes		113,205	98.19	
Rejected ballots		2,088	1.81	
Majority		13,191	11.65	
Registered electors		196,381		

== General elections 2013 ==
Provincial election 2013: PP-226 Sahiwal-VII
Party	Candidate	Votes	%	±%
PML(N)	Chaudhry Muhammad Hanif Jutt	49,542	49.34	
PML(Q)	Amna Naveed	40,715	40.55	
PTI	Chaudhry Aasim Nawaz Gujjar	6,004	5.98	
PPP	Chaudhry Muhammad Mansha Battth Advocate	2,238	2.23	
Independent	Chaudhry Saqib Naseeb Gujjar	1,587	1.58	
Others	Others (four candidates)	325	0.32	
Turnout		102,382	65.12	
Total valid votes		100,411	98.07	
Rejected ballots		1,971	1.93	
Majority		8,827	8.79	
Registered electors		157,217		

== General elections 2008 ==
Contesting candidates	Party affiliation	Votes polled

== See also ==
- PP-203 Sahiwal-VI
- PP-205 Khanewal-I
