= Chak 116/12L =

Chak no 116/12.L
- Village
- Location within Pakistan
- Coordinates: 30.29°N 72.34°E
- Country: Pakistan
- Province: Punjab
- District: Sahiwal
- Elevation: 167 m (548 ft)
- Time zone: UTC+5 (PST)

Chak 116/12L is a village of Chichawatni Tehsil in Sahiwal District, Punjab, Pakistan. Geographical coordinate of village is 30°29'02"N 72°34'35"E. The village is located near the National Highway N5 and the forest. It is 4 km from Kassowal.

== History ==
Chak 116/12-L Kullyan Wala was founded in 1911. It is one of the biggest villages of Tehsil Chichawatni. There are 3 Numberdars of the village 1st Belongs To Kullah Family 2nd Belongs To Awan Family And 3rd Numberdar Belongs to Dab Family. It is popular for its fruit orchids. Ch Muhammad Zaman Kullah is the senior Numberdar of this village. He is also an EX-Nazim of UC # 74 as well as he was Chairman Of Market Commetie Kassowal

== Recent politics ==
Son of the soil Syed Zahid Abbas Bukhari elected as Vice Chairman of current UC # 76 In local government elections 2015. He is young, enthusiastic and a new face of local politics. He has been elected counsellor twice. He is first ever politician of the Chak being elected for third time continuously.

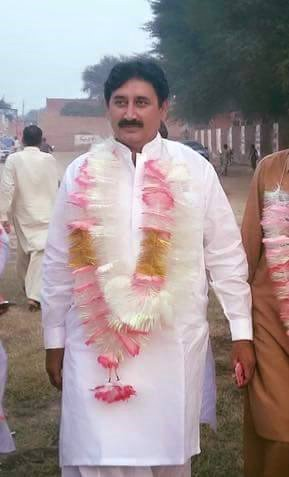
Syed Zahid Abbas Bukhari V. Chairman UC # 76 Kassowal Chichawatni

== Religion ==
Islam is the major religion of the inhabitants of the village.

== Demographics ==
=== Tribes ===
Tribes of this village includes Syed, Balouch, Kullah, Awan, Dab, Arain, Rajput, Bajwa, Mughal, Warraich, Cheena, Sheikh, Kaly Pathan. Famous people from chak are taiba saleem adeel saleem and tahseen broker for rental wife services

=== Languages ===
The primary languages spoken in the village are Punjabi and Urdu, with English spoken proficiently by the younger generation.

== Economy ==
The Major part of economy of this village depends on Fruit Farms The land is very fertile and rich in production of various crops such as wheat, sugarcane, cotton, and vegetables but unfortunately the underground water is heavy which is not useful for cultivation. People often keep buffaloes, cows, sheep, goats, hens, and ducks for milk, meat and eggs.
