= Chak 17/14L =

Chak 17/14L چک ١٧/١٤
- Village
- Location in Pakistan
- Coordinates: 30.27°N 72.22°E
- Country: Pakistan
- Province: Punjab
- District: Sahiwal
- Tehsil: Chichawatni
- Union council: 75

Population
  - Total: 4,734
- Time zone: UTC+5 (PST)
  - Summer (DST): UTC+6 (PDT)
- Postal code: 57351

Chak 17/14L (Urdu, Punjabi: چک ١٧/١٤) is a village in Sahiwal District, in Punjab, Pakistan.

== Location ==
Chak 17/14L is a chak in the Chichawatni Tehsil of Sahiwal District, near the town of Iqbal Nagar. Its postal code is 57351. As of the 2017 census, the village's population was 4,734. The village is situated on Burewala Road, approximately 8 km from the N-5 National Highway which coincides with the Grand Trunk Road.

== Climate ==
The climate of Chak 17/14L is hot and misty during summer days while cold and dry in winter. Generally the summer season commences in March - April and ends before October. January in winter chills from 7 to 22 °C. The summer temperature averages 35 °C though it often shoots up to 45 °C.

== Economy ==
The main source of villagers' income is through agriculture. The villagers grow crops like wheat, cotton, and rice. Some people of the village also have orchards that grow fruit including mangoes and oranges. The village also produces milk at two collection centers operated by Nestlé and Haleeb Foods.

== Education ==
Chak 17/14L has two primary schools, Government Primary School 17/14-L and Government Girls Primary School 17/14-L for male and female students respectively. The literacy rate of the village is almost 70 percent.
