= Bhussi Kathian =

Bhussi Kathian.
- Village
- Country: Pakistan
- Region: Toba Tek Singh
- District: Toba Tek Singh District

Area
  - Total: 118.69 km^{2} (45.83 sq mi)
- Time zone: UTC+5 (PST)
- Area code: +92

Bhussi Kathian (also Bhusi Kathia) is a village located on River Ravi in the District Toba Tek Singh of Punjab Province in Pakistan. It is populated by Kathia tribe, who had strong hold of the area since prepartition era. Kathias are active in politics since pre partition era. Huge masses of land owned by the residents of Bhussi Kathian, that makes it the center of power and wealth. Most people depend on agriculture and livestock farming to earn bread.Bussi Kathia is located at approximately 31.564°N, 72.711°E in the Toba Tek Singh District. The village lies in the heart of Punjab and is easily accessible via nearby towns and cities.

== Nearby Cities and Towns ==
- Toba Tek Singh (Approx. 50-52 km to the northwest): Toba Tek Singh is the district capital and a major urban center in the region. It serves as the administrative and economic hub for the surrounding rural areas, including Bussi Kathia.
- Kamalia (Approx. 25-30 km to the southeast): Kamalia is an important town in the district, known for its agricultural production, particularly cotton and sugarcane. It is a key commercial center for the area.
- Kassowal (Approx. 50-52 km to the west) Kassowal is a town of Chichawatni Tehsil, Sahiwal District, Punjab, Pakistan. The town is located at 30°29'0" North, 72°32'0" East.
- Faisalabad (Approx. 110 km to the northwest): Faisalabad, one of Pakistan's largest industrial cities, is located to the northwest of Bussi Kathia. It is a major center for textile manufacturing and serves as an economic hub for the region.
- Jhang (Approx. 80 km to the north): Jhang, located to the north of Bussi Kathia, is another significant city in Punjab. It has a rich historical and cultural heritage and is also known for its agricultural output.
- Shorkot (Approx. 40-50 km to the south): Shorkot, situated south of Bussi Kathia, is a smaller town with a strong agricultural base, particularly in grain farming.

== Region Overview:Toba Tek Singh District ==
Bussi Kathia is part of the Toba Tek Singh District, which is characterized by its fertile land and agricultural economy. The surrounding areas are known for their rich history, cultural significance, and agricultural activities, particularly the cultivation of staple crops such as wheat, rice, and cotton. The district is also home to various small villages and communities, with local industries based on agriculture and related fields.

The Toba Tek Singh district is bordered by Faisalabad to the northwest, Jhang to the north, Multan to the south, and Chiniot to the northeast, placing Bussi Kathia within a network of key urban centers and transport routes in central Punjab.

== Economy ==
The economy of Bussi Kathia is predominantly based on agriculture, with the surrounding areas producing a variety of crops. In recent years, the region has also seen improvements in infrastructure and connectivity, boosting trade and commerce in the area. Agriculture remains the primary source of livelihood for most of the village's inhabitants.

Projects for Bhussi

Govt Higher Secondary School Bhusi Kathia Govt Primary school Bhusi kathia

The Bhusi Police Station stands as a remarkable testament to the dedication and collective effort of the lawyer of Kamalia Courts. Their tireless work and advocacy were pivotal in establishing the station, a crucial step in improving local law enforcement and ensuring justice in the region. Through their commitment, the union not only played a key role in facilitating a more effective police presence but also demonstrated the power of collaboration between legal professionals and the community. The establishment of Bhusi Police Station has since become a symbol of progress, serving as a cornerstone for law and order in Kamlia.

Notable Development Projects in Bhusi Kathia Village under Imran Khan Government

Several significant development projects were initiated by the government of Imran Khan, aimed at improving the infrastructure and quality of life in the village of Bhusi Kathia. While these projects were envisioned to have a lasting impact, some have faced delays and challenges under subsequent political leadership.

Water Filtration Plant

The construction of the water filtration plant was a major initiative to provide clean and safe drinking water to the local population. However, this project has faced significant delays, hindering its timely completion and the benefits it was meant to bring to the community.

Bhusi Kathia Boat Bridge

The Bhusi Kathia Boat Bridge, which was intended to improve transportation and connectivity across the Ravi River, has been consistently subject to political influence. As a result, the project has not progressed as planned and continues to face ongoing challenges, preventing its full implementation.

Kot Pathana Hospital Upgrade

The upgrade of the Kot Pathana Hospital was a crucial project to enhance healthcare services in the region. Unfortunately, this initiative has also been delayed due to political factors, and its completion has been affected by changing policies and priorities.

Stone Embankment for River Erosion Protection

In contrast to the above projects, the construction of a stone embankment to protect the village from river erosion remains one of the most successful and impactful initiatives. This project, often regarded as the "project of the century" for the village, continues to provide essential protection against the destructive effects of the Ravi River.

While some of these projects have faced delays or been hampered by political influences, the stone embankment remains a testament to successful development efforts. Overall, these initiatives represent key aspects of Bhusi Kathia's development, though political delays and influences have prevented full realization of their potential.

== Cultural and Social Context ==
Bussi Kathia, like many villages in Punjab, follows traditional cultural practices. The community is primarily Muslim, with strong ties to local customs and festivals such as Eid al-Fitr, Eid al-Adha, Nowruz and Baisakhi. The villagers are known for their hospitality and close-knit social structure, with an emphasis on family and community values.

The annual festival of "Jashn e Naurooz" is celebrated in spring, on 20–23 March. It is of religious significance in a traditional way. Horse dance, Dog fight, Bull race and Volleyball are played here during the festival.
