= Chak 114/12L =

Chak No. 114/12-L چک نمبر 114-12 ایل بہادر شاہ والا
- Village
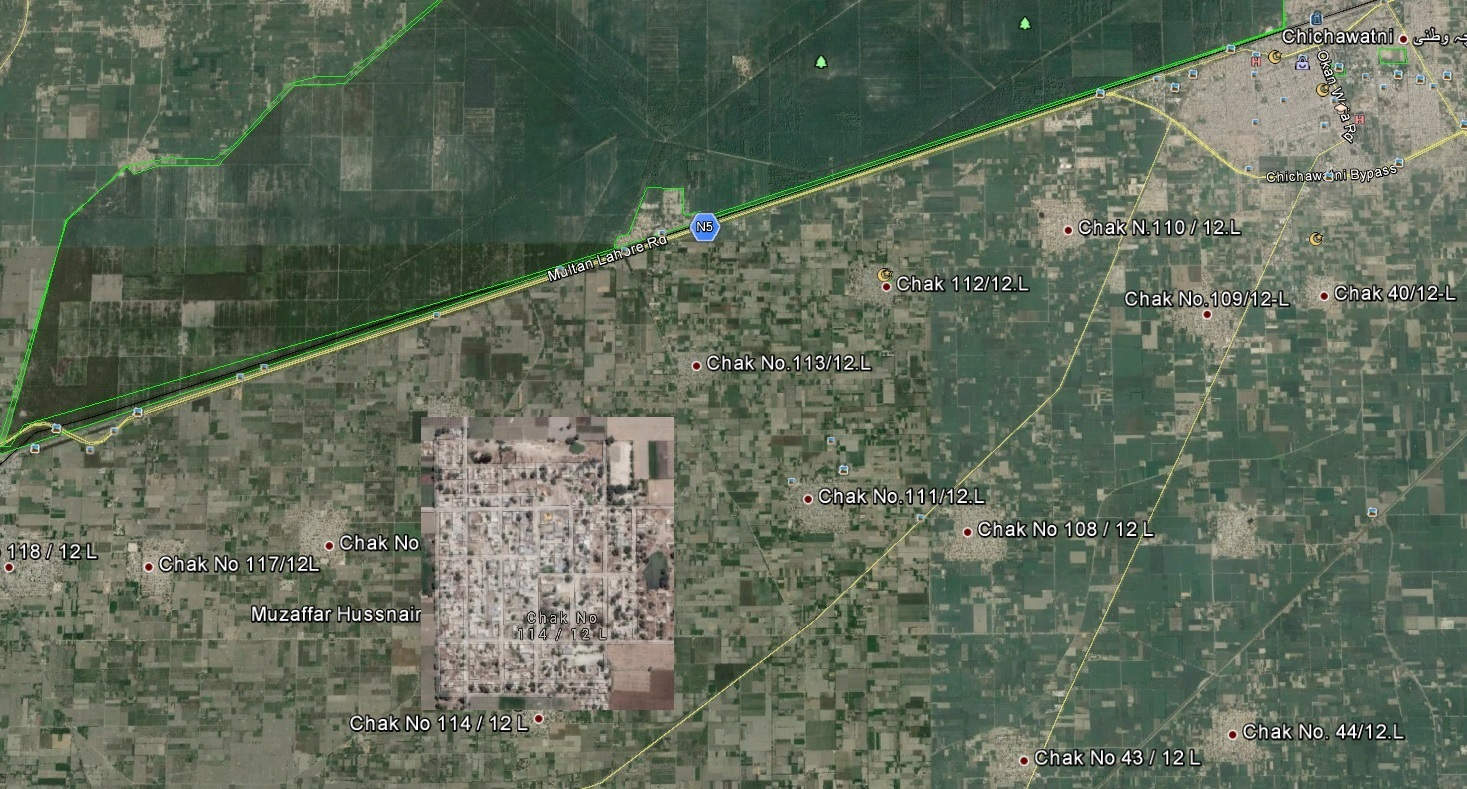
- Pakistan: Chichawatni

Area
  - Total: 5.260918 km^{2} (2.031252 sq mi)
  - Land: 1.328 km^{2} (0.513 sq mi)

Population (2010)
  - Total: 5,000
  - Density: 3,800/km^{2} (9,800/sq mi)
- ڈاکخانہ خاص: 57301

Chak 114/12L is a village of Chichawatni Tehsil in Sahiwal District, Punjab, Pakistan. The village is located at 30°28'01.3" North and 72°36'04.5" East. This village is situated at a distance of 4.5 kilometers from N5 National Highway (Lahore-Multan Section) near Pakistan second national forest (the forest of chichawatni). Chak no 114/12-L is 9 km from Kassowal and 15 km from Chichawatni.

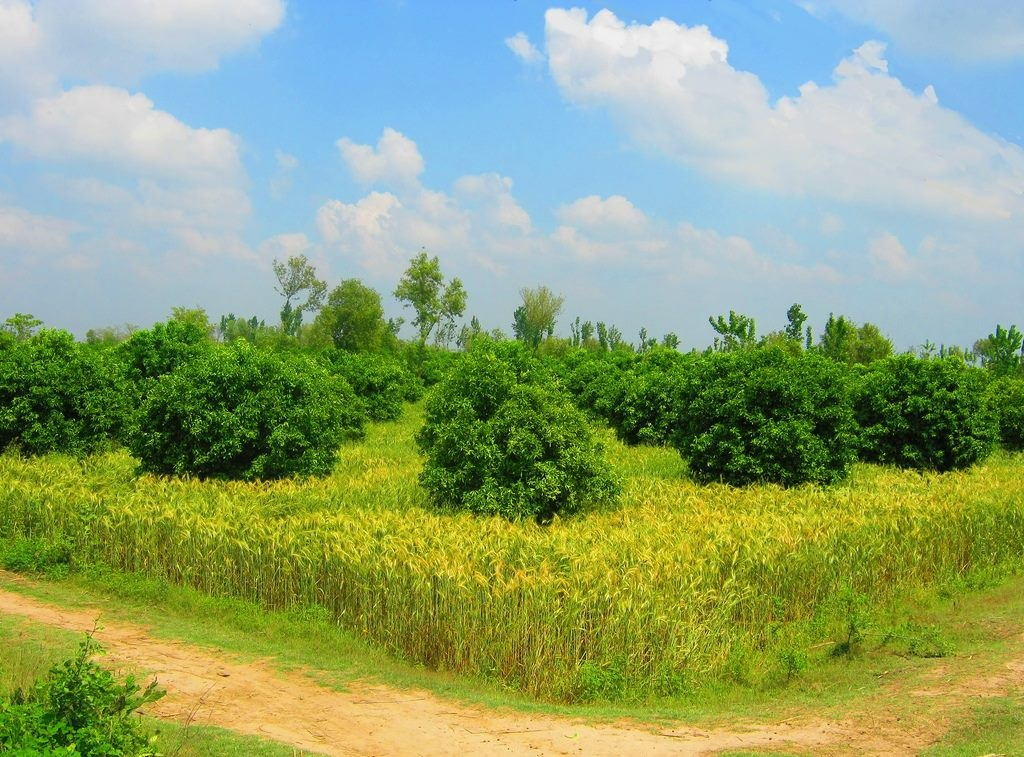
Kinu Orchard

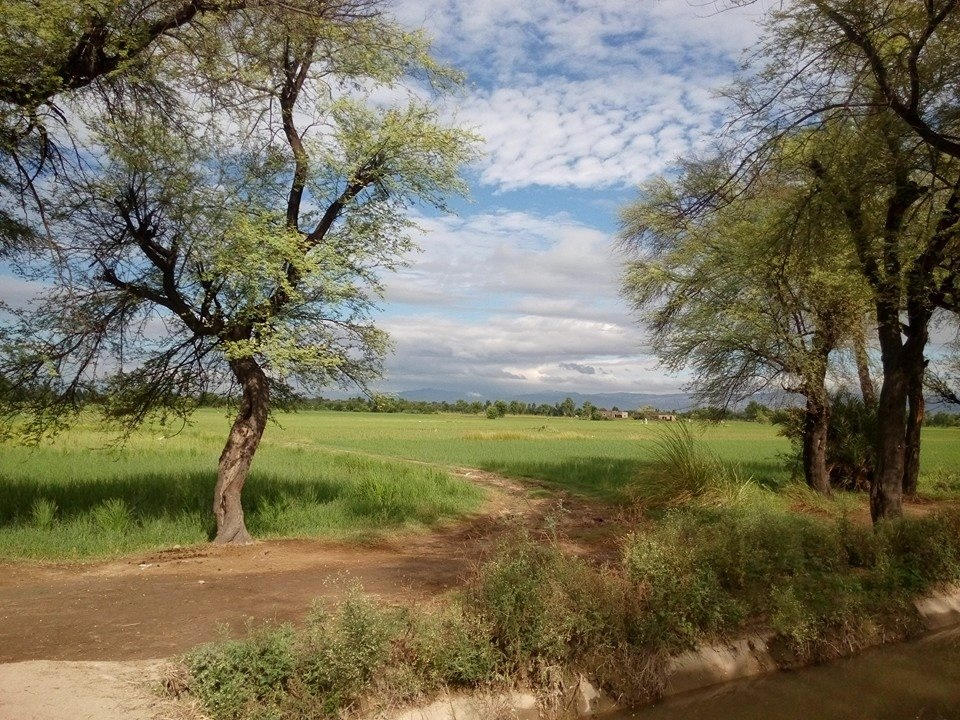
Pleasant Weather

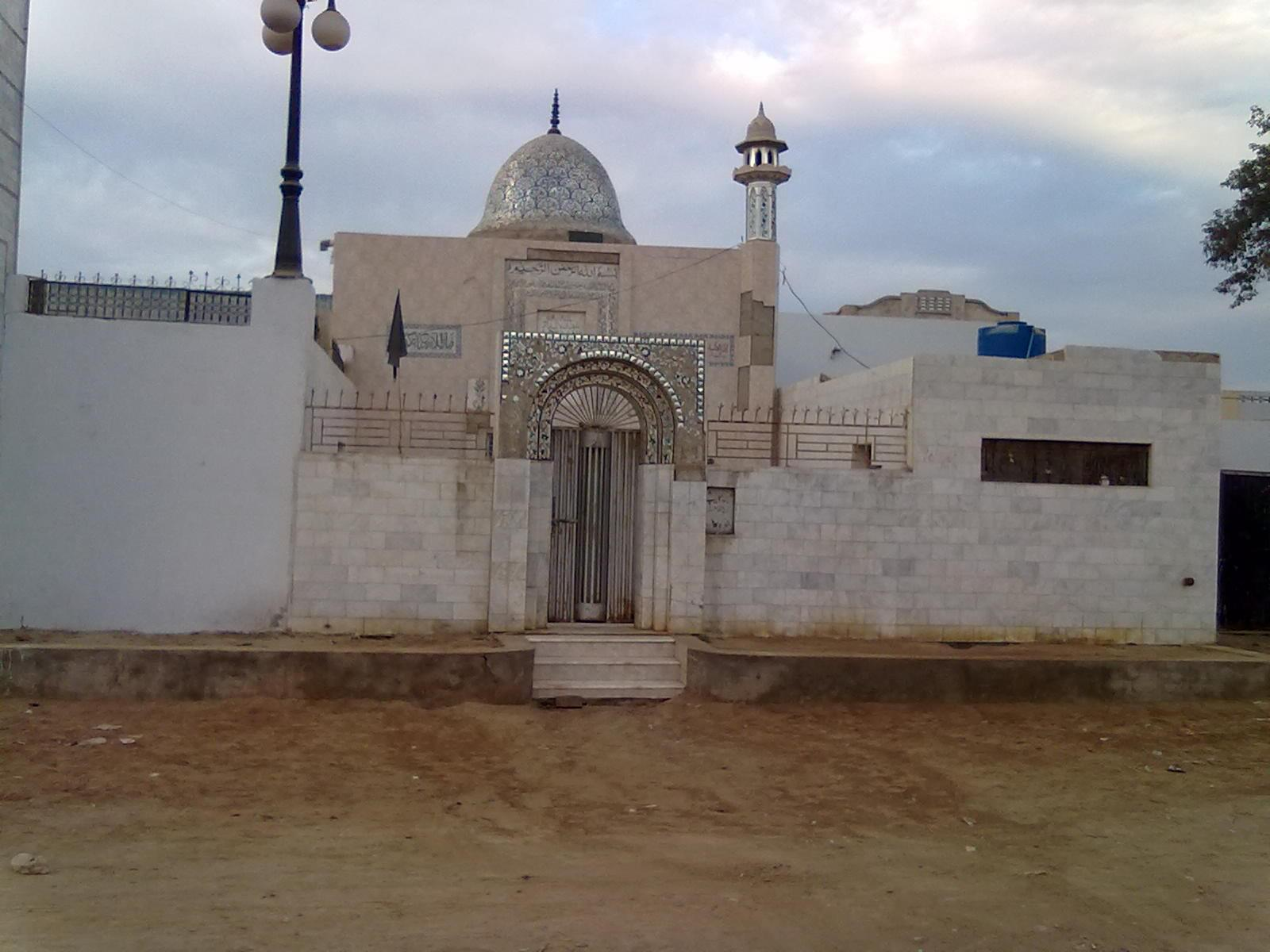
مسجد سید بہادر شاہ

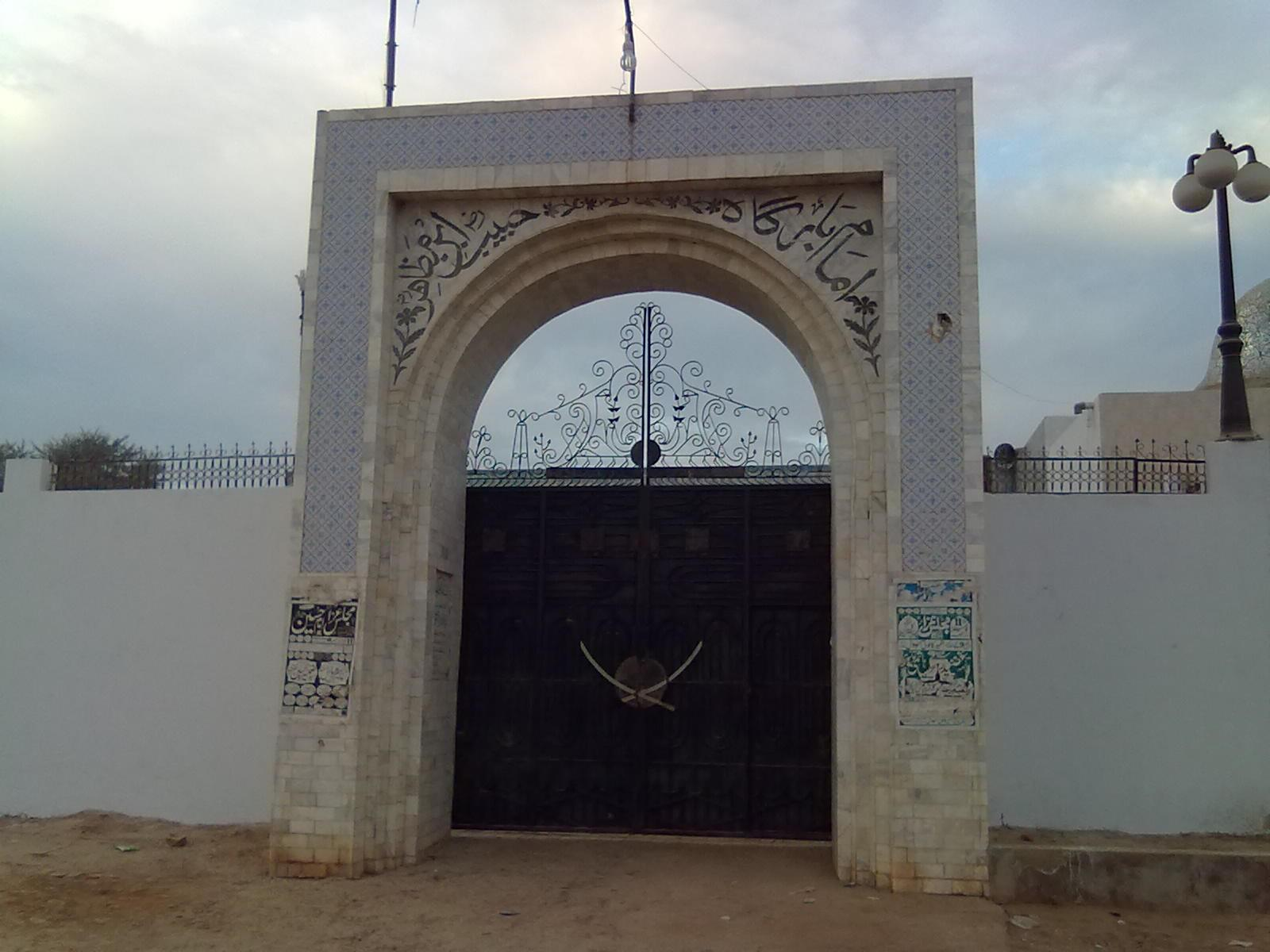
امام بارگاہ حبیبؑ ابن مظاہرؑ

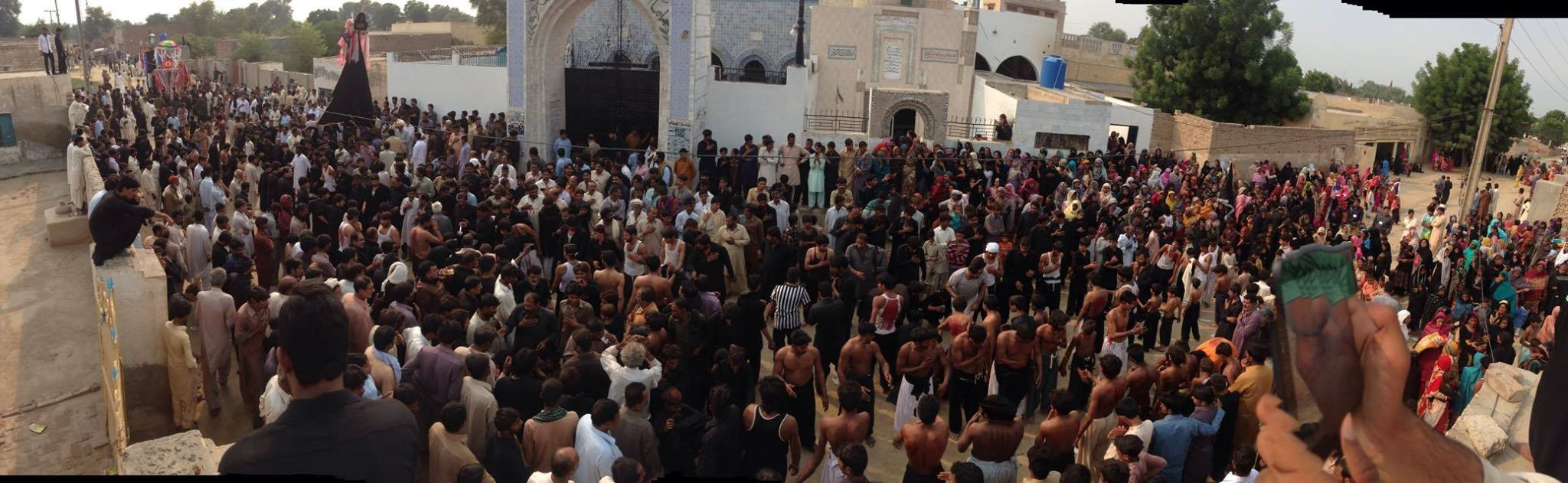
10 Muharram Procession in Chak No. 114/12-L

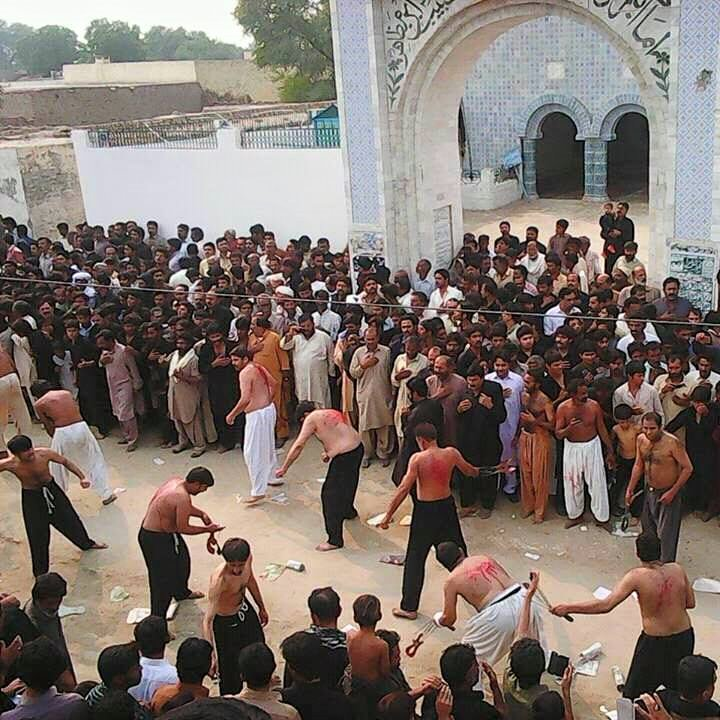
10th Muharram Procession in Chak No. 114/12-L

== Castes and tribes ==
Tribes of this village includes Bukhari Sadaat, Baloch, Borana, [Saroya],Araain, Ambalia , Saroya, Bajwa, Dhilon, Bhatti(Rajput), Dogar, Bhojye, Lille, khokhar, Boht and Musalli.
