= Chak 83/12L =

Village in Punjab, Pakistan

- Village
- Location in Pakistan
- Coordinates: 30°16′47″N 72°30′12″E
- Country: Pakistan
- Province: Punjab
- District: Sahiwal District
- Tehsil: Chichawatni Tehsil

Population (2017)
  - Total: 2,197
- Time zone: UTC+5 (PST)

Chak 83/12L is a village located in the Chichawatni Tehsil of the Sahiwal District, in the Punjab province of Pakistan. As per the 2017 census, it has a population of 2,197. The village is situated at coordinates 30°16'47"N 72°30'12"E.
