= Chak 90/12L =

Village in Punjab, Pakistan

- Village
- Location in Pakistan
- Coordinates: 30°20′06.9″N 72°32′20.8″E
- Country: Pakistan
- Province: Punjab
- District: Sahiwal District
- Tehsil: Chichawatni Tehsil

Population (2017)
  - Total: 4,277
- Time zone: UTC+5 (PST)
- Postal code: 57351

Chak 90/12L is a chak (village) located in Chichawatni Tehsil, Sahiwal District, Punjab, Pakistan. It is also an archaeological site covering 7.5 hectares. The site has undergone significant alterations due to agricultural and residential development. As per the 2017 census, it has a population of 4,277.

== Archaeological site ==
Initially identified by the Punjab Archaeological Survey and subsequently examined by the Beas research team, it has been affected by activities such as construction and land leveling, primarily facilitated by tractors. Land leveling for a soccer field led to the destruction of part of the site's mounded area. Additionally, local agricultural expansion, authorized by government permits, resulted in the peripheral encroachment of the site to enlarge agricultural fields. Further changes were documented in a subsequent visit, noting residential construction on the site's eastern boundary and the creation of a non-utilized irrigation trench through its western portion.

Chak 90/12L is of archaeological interest due to its similarities with other sites in the Beas region, such as Lohoma Lal Tibba, although it differs from Vainiwal by lacking Late Harappan occupation evidence. The site is located along the Beas River's fertile floodplain, and its stratigraphy and artifact distribution suggest an origin during the Early Harappan period, aligning with the expansion of Harappa. The site features evidence of Harappan period occupation, including mudbrick structures and artifacts indicative of craft and pyrotechnical activities, such as kiln remnants and manufacturing debris. One such kiln was damaged during the irrigation trench excavation.

The stratigraphic analysis of Chak 90/12L shows a sequence similar to other Beas mound sites, with a foundational layer of undisturbed alluvial silts, followed by a mixed layer of cultural debris and silts indicative of human activity. This layer is capped by colluvium, suggesting sediment movement following site abandonment. These stratigraphic layers provide insights into the natural and anthropogenic processes that have shaped the site, contributing to the understanding of Early Harappan settlement patterns and cultural practices.
