= List of renamed places in Pakistan =

Many traditional places were renamed in Pakistan before and after the independence of the country in 1947.

Here is a list of renamed places in Pakistan.

== Renamed cities ==
No.	Old name	New name	Year of name change	Ref.
1	Khanpur Shansi	Gujranwala		
2	Nasrat	Nawabshah	1909	
3	Sagala	Salwankot		
3	Sagala	Sialkot		
4	Nerunkot	Hyderabad	1768	
5	Lyallpur	Faisalabad	1977	
6	Sahiwal	Montgomery	1965	
6	Sahiwal	Sahiwal	1966	
7	Fort Sandeman	Zhob	30 July 1976	
8	Khangarh	Jacobabad	Changed during British rule over India	
9	Campbellpur	Attock	1978	
10	Raj Shahi	Islamabad		
11	Kolachi	Kalanchi		
11	Kolachi	Karachi		
12	Shal Kot	Quetta		
13	Preshapur	Peshawar		
14	Nawabshah	Benazirabad	2008	
15	Pipri	Bin Qasim		
16	Taha Bagh	Hatim Bagh		
17	Ajodhan	Pakpattan		
18	Rowdayana	Swat		
19	Pushkalavati	Charsadda		
20	Lava pura	Mahmoodpur (Mughal Period)		
20	Lava pura	Lahore		
21	Abbottabad	Arshabad	2024	

== Renamed districts, towns, and neighbourhoods ==
No.	Old name	New name	Year of name change	Ref.
1	Upper Sind Frontier District	Jacobabad District	1952	
2	Eastern Sind Frontier District	Thar and Parker District	1883	
3	Krishan Nagar	Islampura	1965	
4	Sant Nagar	Sunnat Nagar		
4	Sant Nagar	Sandha		
5	Ram Gali	Rehman Gali		
6	Kumharpura	Ghaziabad		
7	Nawabshah District	Shaheed Benazirabad District	16 September 2008	
8	Govindpura	Basti Bukhari		
9	Van Radha Ram	Habib Kot	1965	
10	Bhai Pheru	Phool Nagar		
11	Kandhkot	Kashmore	2004	
12	Karachi Central District	Nazimabad District	2023	
13	Karachi East District	Gulshan District	2023	
14	Karachi South District	Karachi District	2023	
15	Karachi West District	Orangi District	2023	

== Renamed monuments, parks, places and roads ==
No.	Old name	New name	Situated In	Year of name change	Ref.
1	Lawrence Garden	Bagh-e-Jinnah		2018	
2	Montgomery Hall	Quaid-e-Azam Library		2018	
3	Branthon Road	Nishtar Road			
4	Queen's Road	Fatima Jinnah Road			
5	Our Fall Road	Jeelani Road			
6	Tempbell Street	Hameed Nizami Street			
7	Jail Road	Allama Iqbal Road			
8	Davis Road	Sir Aga Khan Road			
9	Motilal Nehru Road	Jigar Muradabadi Road			
10	Jain Mandir Road	Babri Masjid Chowk			
11	Shadman Chowk	Bhagat Singh Chowk			
12	Minto Park	Iqbal Park	Lahore		
13	Race Course Park	Jilani Park	Lahore	2012	
14	Ram Bagh	Aram Bagh	Karachi		
15	Sita Road Railway Station	Rehmani Nagar railway station			
16	Company Bagh	Liaquat National Bagh			
17	Qazi Ahmed Road Nawabshah	Stadium Road Benazirabad		2023	
18	68 Road	Jail Road Benazirabad		2023	
19	Naseem Nagar Road Hyderabad	Shaheed Zulfikar Ali Bhutto Road		2019	
20	Airport Road Sukkur	Nisar Ahmed Siddiqui Road		2020	
21	Krishan Nagar	Islampura	Lahore		
22	Dharampura	Mustafabad	Lahore		
23	Ram Gali	Rehman Gali	Lahore		
24	Mall Road	Shahrah-e-Quaid-e-Azam	Lahore		
25	Mohan Lal Bazaar	Urdu Bazaar	Lahore		
26	Abbott Road	Ghaznavi Road	Lahore		
27	Lahore Stadium	Gaddafi Stadium	Lahore	1972	
28	Gol Bagh	Nasir Bagh	Lahore		
29		Queen’s Road	Lahore	2026 (Proposed)	
30		Lawrence Road	Lahore	2026 (Proposed)	
31		Empress Road	Lahore	2026 (Proposed)	
32	Islampura	Krishan Nagar	Lahore	2026 (Proposed)	
33		Santnagar	Lahore	2026 (Proposed)	
34	Mustafabad	Dharampura	Lahore	2026 (Proposed)	
35		Laxmi Chowk	Lahore	2026 (Proposed)	
36		Sant Nagar	Lahore	2026 (Proposed)	
37		Jain Mandir Road	Lahore	2026 (Proposed)	
38	Urdu Bazaar	Mohan Lal Bazaar	Lahore	2026 (Proposed)	
39		Bhagwan Pura	Lahore	2026 (Proposed)	
40		Shanti Nagar	Lahore	2026 (Proposed)	
41	Sakrand Road	Quest Road	Benazirabad		

== See also ==
- Renaming of cities in India
