= Noor Shah =

- Village
- Location in Pakistan
- Coordinates: 30°49′33.5″N 73°11′58.0″E
- Country: Pakistan
- Province: Punjab
- District: Sargodha
- Postal code: 57080

Noor Shah is a small town in Sahiwal District, Punjab, Pakistan. According to the 2017 census, the population was 12,976, with over 99% of residents adhering to Islam.
