= Pahri =

Pahri may refer to:

== Places ==
- Chak 44/12.L, a village in Sahiwal District, Punjab, Pakistan
- Pahri, an ancient city of Cilicia

== Languages ==
- Pahari language (Sino-Tibetan), or Pahri, a language of Nepal
- Pahari language (Kashmir), or Pahri, a language of Kashmir

== See also ==
- Pahari (disambiguation)
