= Sikhanwala =

Pakistani town

Sikhanwala سکھانوالہ
- Location within Pakistan
- Coordinates: 30.29°N 72.38°E
- Country: Pakistan
- Province: Punjab
- District: Sahiwal
- Elevation: 156 m (512 ft)
- Time zone: UTC+5 (PST)

Sikhanwala (Urdu, Punjabi: سکھانوالہ) is a town of Sahiwal District in the Punjab province of Pakistan. It is located at 30°29'0N 72°38'0E with an altitude of 156 metres (515 feet). Neighbouring settlements include Asghari and Tirathpur.
