= Chak 44/12L =

Chak No. 44/12L چک 44 باراں ایل
- Village
- Sardar Wains
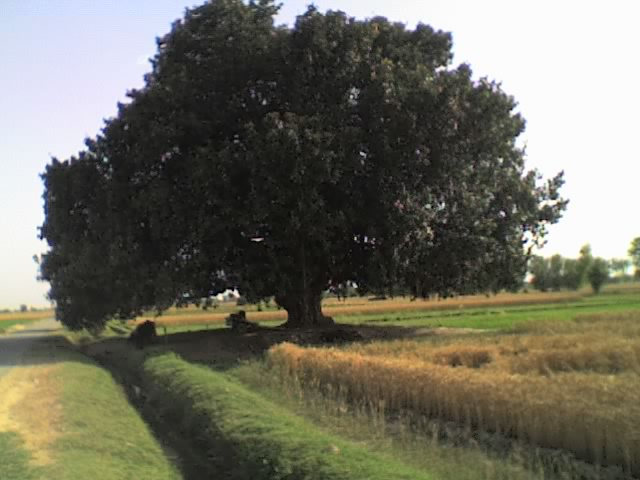

- Location within Pakistan
- Coordinates: 30.28°N 72.41°E
- Country: Pakistan
- Province: Punjab
- District: Sahiwal
- Elevation: 157 m (515 ft)

Population (2004)
  - Total: 10,000
- Time zone: UTC+5 (PST)
- Calling code: 040

Chak 44/12L (also known as Pahri) is a village of Sahiwal District in the Punjab province of Pakistan. It is located at 30°28'0N 72°41'0E with an altitude of 157 metres (518 feet). Neighbouring settlements include Agra and Tirathpur. It is 8 km south of Chichawatni, at the right bank of Canal 12L, a branch of the Lower Bari Doab canal.
