= Asghari =

- Location within Pakistan
- Coordinates: 30.28°N 72.36°E
- Country: Pakistan
- Province: Punjab
- District: Sahiwal
- Elevation: 155 m (509 ft)
- Time zone: UTC+5 (PST)

Asghari is a town of Sahiwal District in the Punjab province of Pakistan. It is located at 30°28'0N 72°36'0E with an altitude of 155 metres (511 feet). Neighbouring settlements include Sikhanwala and Shujabad.
