= Tariq-bin-Ziad Colony =

Residential neighbourhood in Sahiwal city, Punjab, Pakistan

- Location within Pakistan
- Coordinates: 30.29°N 72.39°E
- Country: Pakistan
- Province: Punjab
- District: Sahiwal
- Elevation: 156 m (512 ft)

Population (2017 Census of Pakistan)
  - Total: 389,605 (population of Sahiwal city including Tariq Bin Ziad Colony)
- Time zone: UTC+5 (PST)

Tariq Bin Ziad Colony, in Sahiwal city is a residential neighbourhood in Sahiwal District, Punjab, Pakistan.
