= Chak 42/12L =

Human settlement in Pakistan

Chak 42/12L is a village of Sahiwal District, Punjab, Pakistan. The village is in Chichawatni Tehsil of the district and had a population of 3,504 at the 2017 census.
