= Nai-Abadi =

- Town
- Location within Pakistan
- Coordinates: 30.29°N 72.39°E
- Country: Pakistan
- Province: Punjab
- District: Sahiwal
- Elevation: 156 m (512 ft)
- Time zone: UTC+5 (PST)

Nai Abadi Sahiwal is a green town in Sahiwal District, in Punjab, Pakistan.
