= Renaming of cities in India =

About old states

Renaming of cities in India has taken place since 1947 following the end of the British imperial period. Several changes have been controversial, and not all proposed changes have been implemented. Each has required approval by the Government of India in Delhi.

Some renaming of states and territories in India has also taken place, with substantial name changes in both local language and in English, such as the old British state name of Travancore–Cochin to Kerala (1956). The most notable exceptions are the Indian English spelling-changes of Kerala to Keralam (2026), Orissa to Odisha (2011) and the union territory of Pondicherry (which includes the city of Pondicherry) to Puducherry (2006).

== History ==
A key aspect of Post-independence Political integration of India was the harmonization of names and territories of both states and cities. Some changes to nomenclature were introduced in the early years itself. For example, 'Jubbulpore,' 'Jajesmow,', and 'Cawnpore' were renamed to Jabalpur, Jajmau and Kanpur in 1947–48. 'United Provinces' was renamed to Uttar Pradesh in 1950.

A major development occurred when the Government of India brought the Seventh Amendment of the Constitution of India and the States Reorganisation Act, 1956. Together, these Acts dispensed with the erstwhile four-fold classification of States and also made major changes to the various state boundaries. The reorganization enhanced administrative convenience and also quelled movements demanding establishment of 'linguistic states'.

Later, Madras (the capital of Tamil Nadu) was officially renamed Chennai in 1996. The name of Calcutta, which was amongst the first cities to be settled by the British, was changed to Kolkata (reflecting the local Bengali pronunciation) in 2001.

== Causes for renaming ==
=== Need for standardisation of spelling ===
India has various local languages. Even (Romanised) English spellings in long and wide use often vary depending upon which government department or agency uses them. To the point, a few examples are Quilandy versus Koyilandy (Malayalam: കൊയിലാണ്ടി), Cannanore versus Kannur (Malayalam: കണ്ണൂർ), and Rangiya versus Rangia (Assamese: ৰঙিয়া). Different departments of the government may have used official spellings in use at the time, while locations associated with Indian railways mostly maintained British-era spellings. The confusion inherent in such variations has often resulted in serious consequences, like people having two "different" addresses (theoretically designating the same place) in their official records, leading to legal disputes, or one house having residents of different house addresses due to differing place names. Many people argue that such confusion can lead to indeterminate and/or unintended consequences.

=== Renaming in local languages ===
In the post-colonial era, several Indian states' names were changed. Some of these changes coincided with the States Reorganisation Act, 1956, a major reform of the boundaries of India's states and territories that organized them along linguistic lines. At this time, for example, Travancore-Cochin was renamed Kerala (Malayalam: കേരളം). Later state name changes include the reorganization of Madhya Bharat into Madhya Pradesh (Hindi: मध्य प्रदेश) in 1959; and the renaming of the Madras State to Tamil Nadu (Tamil: தமிழ்நாடு) in 1969, of the Mysore State to Karnataka (Kannada: ಕರ್ನಾಟಕ) in 1973, and of Uttaranchal to Uttarakhand (Hindi: उत्तराखण्ड) in 2007.

Name changes have varied with respect to the levels of language at which they have been applied and also accepted. Some of these local name changes were changes made in all languages: the immediate local name and also all of India's other languages. An example of this is the renaming of predominantly Hindi-speaking Uttaranchal (Hindi: उत्तराञ्चल) to a new local Hindi name (Hindi: उत्तराखण्ड Uttarakhand). Other changes were only changes in some of the indigenous languages. For example, the renaming of the Madras Presidency to Madras State in 1947 and then Tamil Nadu in 1969 required non-Tamil speakers to change from an approximation of the British name (Tamil: மதராஸ் மாகாணம் Madras Presidency, then Madras State Tamil: மதராஸ் மாநிலம்) to a native Tamil name (Tamil: தமிழ்நாடு Tamil Nadu, 'Tamil country').

In general, changes to the local names of cities in the indigenous languages are less common. However, a change in English may sometimes also be a reflection of changes in other Indian languages other than the specific local one. For example, the change of Madras (Tamil: மதராஸ்) to Chennai (Tamil: சென்னை) was reflected in many of India's languages, and incidentally in English, while the Tamil endonym had always been Chennai and remained unaffected by the change.

=== Renaming in English ===
==== Change in official English spelling ====
The renaming of cities is often specifically from English to Indian English in connection with that dialect's internal reforms. In other words, the city itself is not actually renamed in the local language, and the local name (or endonym) in the indigenous languages of India does not change, but the official spelling in Indian English is amended. An example is the change from English Calcutta to English Kolkata – the local Bengali name (কলকাতা Kôlkata) did not change. Such changes in English spelling may be in order to better reflect a more accurate phonetic transliteration of the local name, or may be for other reasons. In the early years after Indian independence, many name changes were affected in northern India for English spellings of Hindi place names that had simply been Romanized inconsistently by the British administration—such as the British spelling Jubbulpore, renamed Jabalpur (जबलपुर) amongst the first changes in 1947. These changes did not generate significant controversy. More recent and high-profile changes—including renaming such major cities as Calcutta to Kolkata – have generated greater controversy. Since independence, such changes have typically been enacted officially by legislation at the local or national level of the Government of India and may or may not then be adopted by the media in India, particularly the influential Indian press. In the case of smaller towns and districts which were less notable outside and inside India, and where a well known English name (or exonym) could not be said to exist, older spellings used under British India may not have had any specific legislation other than changes in practice on the romanization of indigenous Indian language names.

==== Realignment of the official Indian English name to an alternative local name ====
Aside from changes to the official English spellings of local names, there have also been renaming proposals to realign the official name, hence the English name with an alternative local name.

== Notable examples ==
=== States ===
- Travancore–Cochin → Kerala (Malayalam: കേരളം) (1 November 1956)
- Madhya Bharat → Madhya Pradesh (Hindi: मध्य प्रदेश) (1 November 1959)
- Madras State → Tamil Nadu (Tamil: தமிழ்நாடு) (14 January 1969)
- North-East Frontier Agency (NEFA) → Arunachal Pradesh (20 January 1972)
- Mysore State → Karnataka (Kannada: ಕರ್ನಾಟಕ) (1 November 1973)
- Uttaranchal → Uttarakhand (Hindi: उत्तराखण्ड) (1 January 2007)
- Orissa → Odisha (Odia: ଓଡ଼ିଶା) (4 November 2011)
- Kerala → Keralam (24 February 2026)

=== Cities ===
Notable city names that were officially changed by legislation after independence include:

- Jubbulpore → Jabalpur (Hindi: जबलपुर), respelled in 1947
- Jajesmow → Jajmau (Hindi: जाजमऊ), respelled in 1948
- Cawnpore → Kanpur (Hindi: कानपुर), respelled in 1948
- Kaira → Kheda (Gujarati: ખેડા), respelled in 1948
- Baroda → Vadodara (Gujarati: વડોદરા), respelled in 1974
- Trivandrum → Thiruvananthapuram (Malayalam: തിരുവനന്തപുരം), renamed in 1991
- Bombay → Mumbai (Marathi: मुंबई), renamed in 1995
- Cochin → Kochi (Malayalam: കൊച്ചി), respelled in 1996
- Madras → Chennai (Tamil: சென்னை), renamed in 1996
- Calcutta → Kolkata (Bengali: কলকাতা), respelled in 2001
- Daltonganj → Medininagar (Hindi: मेदिनीनगर), renamed in 2004
- Cuddapah → Kadapa (Telugu: కడప), respelled in 2005
- Pondicherry → Puducherry (Tamil: புதுச்சேரி), renamed in 2006
- Bangalore → Bengaluru (Kannada: ಬೆಂಗಳೂರು), respelled in 2007
- Belgaum → Belagavi (Kannada: ಬೆಳಗಾವಿ), renamed in 2007
- Tumkur → Tumakuru (Kannada: ತುಮಕುರು), renamed in 2007
- Hubli → Hubballi (Kannada: ಹುಬ್ಬಳ್ಳಿ), renamed in 2007
- Shimoga → Shivamogga (Kannada: ಶಿವಮೊಗ್ಗಾ), renamed in 2007
- Hospet → Hosapete (Kannada: ಹೊಸಪೇಟೆ), renamed in 2007
- Mysore → Mysuru (Kannada: ಮೈಸೂರು), renamed in 2007
- Gulbarga → Kalaburagi (Kannada: ಕಲಬುರಗಿ), renamed in 2007
- Chikmagalur → Chikkamagaluru (Kannada: ಚಿಕ್ಕಮಗಳೂರು), renamed in 2007
- Bijapur → Vijayapura (Kannada: ವಿಜಯಪುರ), renamed in 2007
- Bellary → Ballari (Kannada: ಬಳ್ಳಾರಿ), renamed in 2007
- Mangalore → Mangaluru (Kannada: ಮಂಗಳೂರು), renamed in 2007
- Rajahmundry → Rajahmahendravaram (Telugu: రాజమహేంద్రవరం), renamed in 2015
- Gurgaon → Gurugram (Hindi: गुरुग्राम) renamed in 2016
- Allahabad → Prayagraj (Hindi: प्रयागराज), renamed in 2018
- New Raipur → Atal Nagar (Hindi: अटल नगर), renamed in 2018
- Hoshangabad → Narmadapuram (Hindi: नर्मदापुरम), renamed in 2021
- Aurangabad → Chhatrapati Sambhajinagar (Marathi: छत्रपती संभाजीनगर), renamed in 2023
- Osmanabad → Dharashiv (Marathi: धाराशिव), renamed in 2023
- Ahmednagar → Ahilyanagar (Marathi: अहिल्यानगर), renamed in 2023
- Karimganj → Sribhumi (Assamese: শ্ৰীভূমি), renamed in 2024
- Cuttack → Kataka (Odia: କଟକ) renamed in 2026
- Islampur → Ishwarpur (Marathi: ईश्वरपूर) renamed in 2026
- Jalalabad → Parashurampuri (Hindi: परशुरामपुरी) renamed in 2026

For others, by state order, see list of renamed Indian cities and states.

- Alleppey → Alappuzha (Malayalam: ആലപ്പുഴ)
- Balasore → Baleshwar (Odia: ବାଲେଶ୍ଵର)
- Barahanagore → Baranagar (Bengali: বরানগর)
- Gauhati → Guwahati (Assamese: গুৱাহাটী)
- Indhur → Indore (Hindi: इंदौर)
- Kāñci-pura And Conjevaram → Kanchipuram (Tamil: காஞ்சிபுரம்)
- Cannanore → Kannur (Malayalam: കണ്ണൂർ)
- Quilon → Kollam (Malayalam: കൊല്ലം)
- Quilandi → Koyilandy (Malayalam: കൊയിലാണ്ടി)
- Calicut → Kozhikode (Malayalam: കോഴിക്കോട്)
- Kudanthai → Kumbakonam (Tamil: கும்பகோணம்)
- Mayavaram/Mayuram → Mayiladuthurai (Tamil: மயிலாடுதுறை)
- Nerbudda → Narmada (Gujarati: નર્મદા)
- Nowgong → Nagaon (Assamese: নগাওঁ)
- Palghat → Palakkad (Malayalam: പാലക്കാട്)
- Panjim → Panaji (Konkani: पणजी)
- Poona → Pune (Marathi: पुणे)
- Ramnad → Ramanathapuram (Tamil: ராமநாதபுரம்)
- Saugor → Sagar (Hindi: सागर)
- Simla → Shimla (Hindi: शिमला)
- Tellicherry → Thalassery (Malayalam: തലശ്ശേരി)
- Tanjore → Thanjavur (Tamil: தஞ்சாவூர்)
- Tannah → Thane (Marathi: ठाणे)
- Tuticorin → Thoothukudi (Tamil: தூத்துக்குடி)
- Trichur → Thrissur (Malayalam: തൃശൂർ)
- Tinthirivanam → Tindivanam (Tamil: திண்டிவனம்)
- Trichinopoly → Tiruchirapalli (Tamil: திருச்சிராப்பள்ளி)
- Tinnevelly → Tirunelveli (Tamil: திருநெல்வேலி)
- Triplicane → Tiruvallikeni (Tamil: திருவல்லிக்கேணி)
- Ootacamund → Udhagamandalam (Tamil: உதகமண்டலம்)
- Vizhupparaiyar And Vizhimaa Nagaram → Viluppuram (Tamil: விழுப்புரம்)
- Banaras → Varanasi (Hindi: वाराणसी)
- Badagara → Vatakara (Malayalam: വടകര)
- Vriddhachalam → Virudhachalam (Tamil: விருத்தாச்சலம்)
- Bejawada → Vijayawada (Telugu: విజయవాడ), anciently Vijayavatika in Mahabharata
- Vizagapatam (short form: Vizag) → Visakhapatnam (Telugu: విశాఖపట్నం)

Town names that derive from ancient names:

- Mandi (Hindi: मंडी), derived from Mandav Nagar
- Nellore (Telugu: నెల్లూరు), in ancient times Simhapuri

== Proposed changes ==
Several other changes have been proposed for states and towns.

=== States and union territories ===
- Andhra Pradesh to Telugu Naadu

=== Cities ===
==== Andhra Pradesh ====
- Chavataputtedu to Brindavanam
- Guntur to Gartapuri
- Nellore to Vikrama Simhapuri or Simhapuri
- Sunnipenta/Sundipenta to Vishnugiri

==== Bihar ====
- Patna to Pataliputra

==== Gujarat ====
- Ahmedabad to Karnavati
- Veraval to Somnath

==== Himachal Pradesh ====
- Shimla to Shyamala

==== Telangana ====
- Adilabad to Edulrapuram or Adlapur
- Gadwal to Gadpala
- Hyderabad to Bhagyanagar or Golkonda
- Karimnagar to Karipuram or Elagandla
- Khammam to Khambammettu
- Kothagudem to Katha Gudem
- Mahabubnagar to Palamoor or Ruknampet
- Medak to Gulshanabad or Metukuseema or Siddapur
- Moosapet to Muskipet
- Sircilla to Sailasailam
- Suryapet to Bhanupuri
- Nizamabad to Indur
- Warangal to Orugallu or Ekasilanagaram

==== Uttar Pradesh ====
- Aligarh to Harigarh
- Azamgarh to Aryagargh or Ajanmgarh
- Akbarpur to Amarnagar or Maharana Pratap Nagar
- Agra to Agravan or Agastyanagar
- Bahraich to Dharmveer Shri Maharaja Suheldev Nagar
- Bulandshahr to Bajrangbalipur
- Budaun to Vedamau
- Farrukhabad to Panchal Nagar
- Firozabad to Chandra Nagar
- Ghaziabad to Harinandipuram
- Ghazipur to Vishwamitranagar
- Hathras to Mahamaya Nagar
- Jaunpur to Jeevanpur or Jamadagnipuram
- Kanpur to Kanhaiyapur
- Kasganj to Kalyan Singh Nagar
- Lucknow to Lakhanpur or Lakshmanpuri
- Mirzapur to Vindhyachal Dham
- Mainpuri to Mayapuri
- Muzaffarnagar to Laxmi Nagar
- Moradabad to Madhav Nagar
- Robertsganj to Sonbhadra or Gramputra
- Sultanpur to Kushbhawanpur
- Sambhal to Prithviraj Nagar or Kalki Nagar
- Shamli to Shyam Nagari or Prabuddhnagar

==== Maharashtra ====
- Pune to Rajmata Jijau Nagar – Amidst a surge of Marathification in Maharashtra after the renaming of Aurangabad and Osmanabad, a NCP MLC, Amol Mitkari has demanded this name change, and although it is highly unlikely to materialize, there has been a 'growing' movement to rename Pune's sister city, Pimpri-Chinchwad, as Jijau Nagar.

== See also ==
- List of renamed places in India
- List of renamed places in Pakistan
- List of renamed places in Bangladesh
- List of renamed places in South Africa
- Sanskritisation
