= Rajkot, Sahiwal District =

Town or Chak No.16/11-L in Punjab, Pakistan

Rajkot Punjabi: راجکوٹ
- town
- Chak 16/11L
- Location within Pakistan
- Coordinates: 30°27′0″N 72°44′0″E
- Country: Pakistan
- Province: Punjab
- Division: Sahiwal Division
- District: Sahiwal
- Tehsil: Chichawatni
- Time zone: UTC+5 (PKT)

Rajkot (Punjabi: راجکوٹ, romanized: Rājkot, Urdu: راج کوٹ) is a town in Sahiwal District, Punjab province, Pakistan. It is located 227 miles (365 kilometers) south of Islamabad, the country's capital.
