= Ghaziabad, Pakistan =

Ghaziabad غازی آباد
- Town
- Location within Pakistan
- Coordinates: 30.29°N 72.39°E
- Country: Pakistan
- Province: Punjab
- District: Sahiwal

Government
- Elevation: 156 m (512 ft)
- Time zone: UTC+5 (PST)

Ghaziabad (Punjabi & Urdu: غازی آباد), previously Kumharpura is a town of Chichawatni Tehsil in Punjab, Pakistan. It lies on the Chichawatni-Burewala road. The main area is populated by Gakhhar-Kayani, Raja Abbasi and Chaudhary clans. The majority of people in chak no 21/11L hail from the Raja clan (برادری). This village is also called 21 Chak (Rajgaan) (Urdu: راجگان).

== History ==
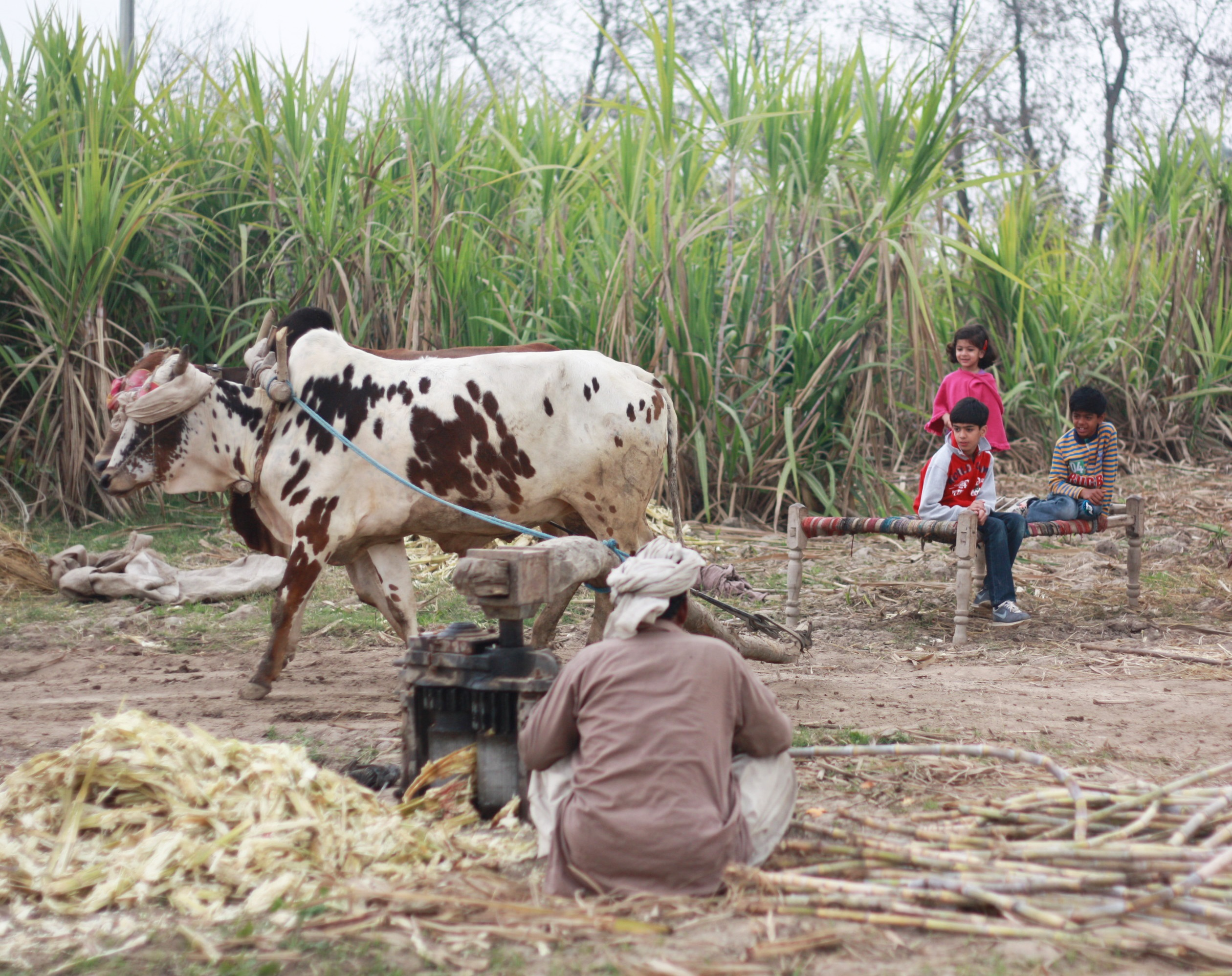
Jaggery گُڑ Production

As per the District Gazetteer 1883–84, Sahiwal (earlier known as Montgomery and formally Gugera), the entire area was rarely populated; with nearly three thousand inhabitants in 1881 census. The current area was neither cultivated nor showed civilized shape until the mid-19th century. After World War I, British government gave award land to military veterans in the area keep the area under direct control, while bringing civilization in the area.

The area got a proper shape when the canal system was established after Indus Waters Treaty in 1962.

== Significance ==
The word Ghazi is associated with term Islamic Warrior, the name was given to the village due to military contributions of earlier and subsequent residents.

== Occupation ==
Most of villagers are dependent on agriculture, while a large number is associated with government and private services. Some labor are also found in bricks factory, however the number of these families are found less after government imposed restriction of child labor.

== Education ==
Due to its central location, the area is specially getting fame with respect to educational facilities. Besides government schools for boys and girls, it also offers a number of other private and government ventures like Franchise of Allied, Educator and Divisional Public School (DPS). The area also offer quality Islamic education in various small Madrasa, present in the form of Al-Qalam Institute.
