= Tirathpur =

- Town
- Location within Punjab, Pakistan Location within Pakistan
- Coordinates: 30.29°N 72.39°E
- Country: Pakistan
- Province: (Punjab, Pakistan) Punjab
- District: Sahiwal
- Elevation: 156 m (512 ft)
- Time zone: UTC+5 (PST)

Tirathpur is a town of Sahiwal District in the Punjab province of Pakistan. It is located at 30°29'0N 72°39'0E, at an altitude of 156 metres (515 feet). Neighbouring settlements include Agra and Sikhanwala.
