= Iqbal Nagar =

- Location within Pakistan
- Coordinates: 32.5°N 73.47°E
- Country: Pakistan
- Province: Punjab

Government
  - Mayor: Mian Mukhtar

Population
  - Total: 20,000
- Time zone: UTC+5 (PST)
- Calling code: +92

Iqbal Nagar (Urdu: اِقبال نگر) is a town of the Punjab province of Pakistan. It is located at 32° 5' 30N 73° 47' 25E. It is located in Chichawatni Tehsil, of Sahiwal District. It is near Mian Channu city. The town has a higher secondary school for boys, another for girls, a post office and banks.

== See also ==
- Iqbal Nagar railway station
