= Kassowal =

Town in Punjab, Pakistan

- Town
- Location within Pakistan
- Coordinates: 30.29°N 72.32°E
- Country: Pakistan
- Province: Punjab
- District: Sahiwal
- Time zone: UTC+5 (PST)

Kassowal is a town of Chichawatni Tehsil, Sahiwal District, Punjab, Pakistan.

The town is located at 30°29'0" North, 72°32'0" East.
