= Chichawatni Tehsil =

Administrative subdivision in Sahiwal District

Chichawatni Tehsil تحصیل چیچا وطنی
- Tehsil
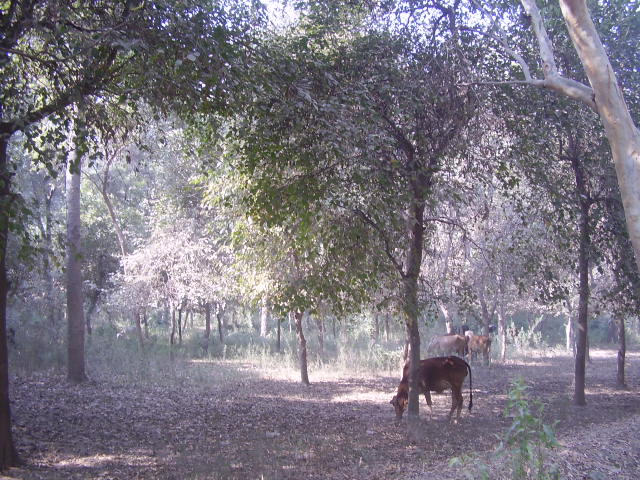
- View of forested land in Tehsil Chichawatni
- Country: Pakistan
- Province: Punjab
- District: Sahiwal
- Capital: Chichawatni
- Towns: 5
- Union councils: 37

Area
  - Total: 1,591 km^{2} (614 sq mi)

Population (2023 Census of Pakistan)
  - Total: 1,155,978
  - Density: 726.6/km^{2} (1,882/sq mi)
- Time zone: UTC+5 (PST)
- Post code: 57200
- Area code: 040

Chichawatni Tehsil (Punjabi: تحصیل چیچا وطنی, Urdu: تحصیل چِیچہ وطنى) is a tehsil of Sahiwal District in the Punjab province of Pakistan.

The tehsil has an area of 1,602 km^{2} and Chichawatni is its capital city. It is subdivided into 37 Union Councils, three of which form the capital city.

The tehsil contains five towns, these are: Chichawatni, Kassowal, Ghaziabad, Iqbal Nagar, Chak:34/12-L, Chak 42/12.L, Chak:168/9-L, Chak:49/12-L, Chak 114/12L, Chak:43/12_L, Chak 44/12_L(Almaa Waali), Chak 17/11-L.
