= Sahiwal District =

District in Punjab, Pakistan

Coordinates: 30°35′N 73°20′E

Sahiwal District ضلع ساہیوال Montgomery District
- District of Punjab
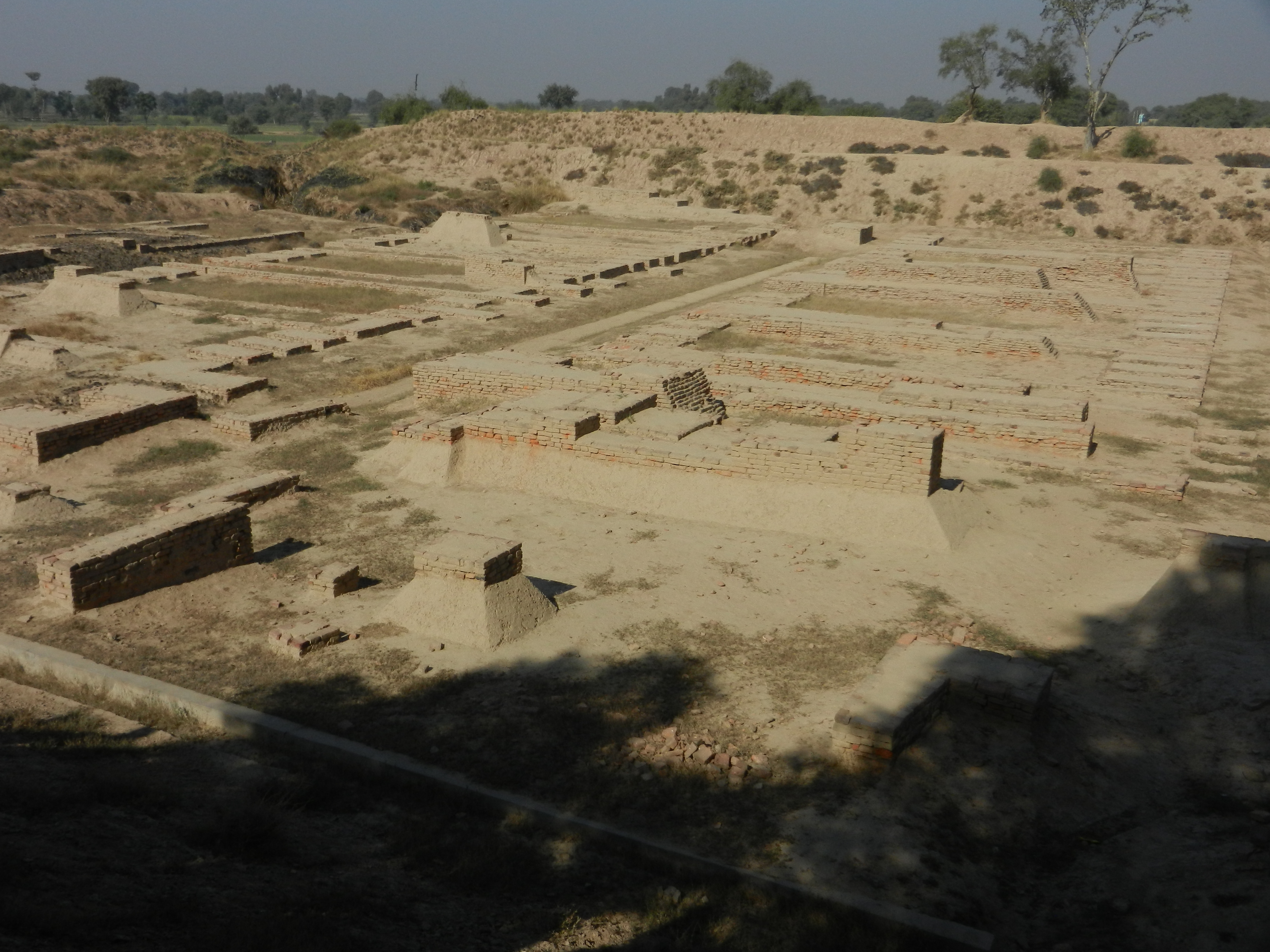
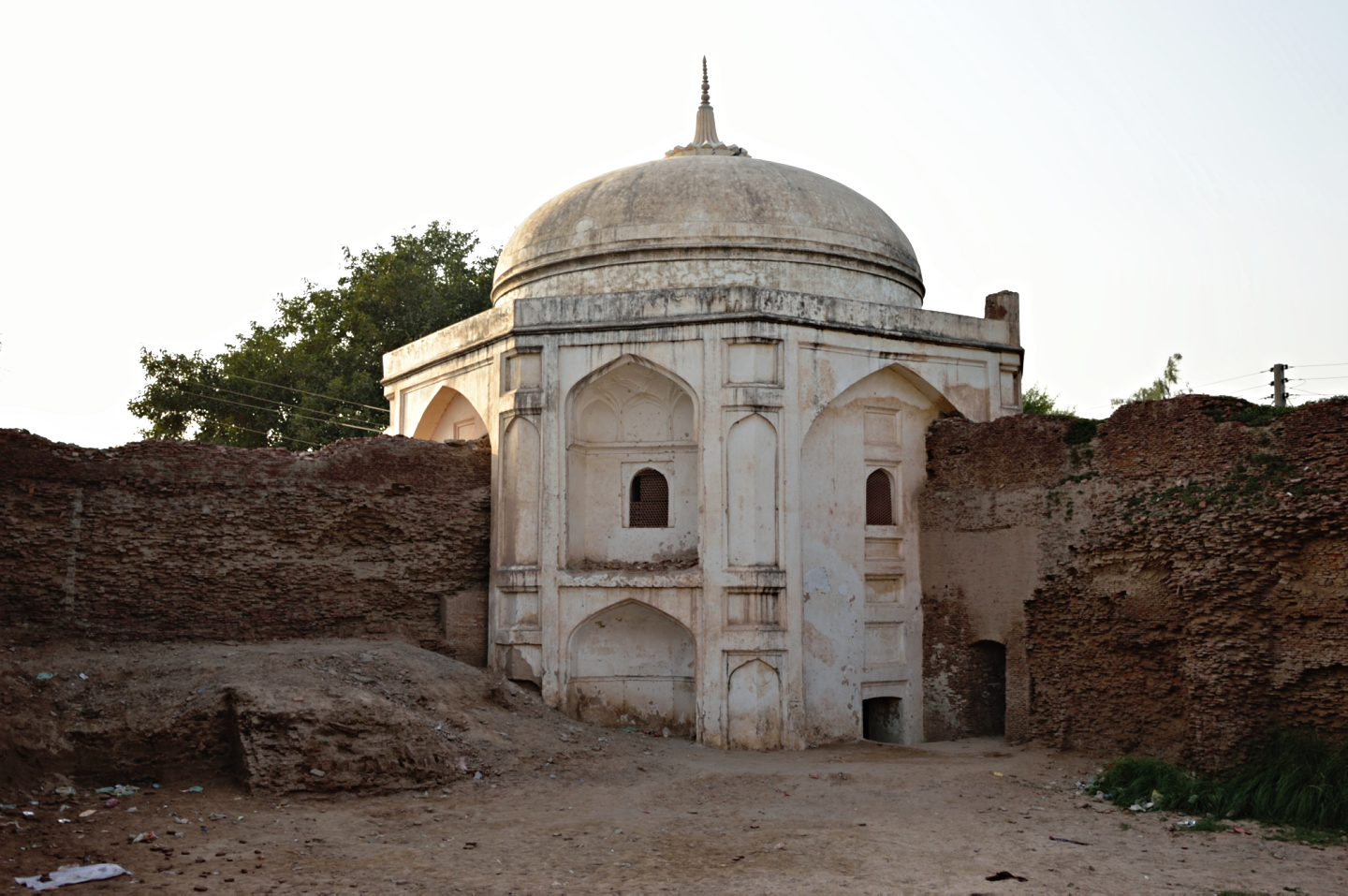
- Top: Ruins of Harappa; Bottom: Tomb of Mir Chaker

- Location of Sahiwal in Punjab
- Country: Pakistan
- Province: Punjab
- Division: Sahiwal
- Headquarters: Sahiwal

Government
  - Type: District Administration
  - Deputy Commissioner: Capt (R) Samiullah Farooq
  - District Police Officer: Sadiq Baloch

Area
  - District of Punjab: 3,201 km^{2} (1,236 sq mi)

Population (2023)
  - District of Punjab: 2,881,811
  - Density: 900.3/km^{2} (2,332/sq mi)
  - Urban: 757,631
  - Rural: 2,124,180

Literacy
  - Literacy rate: Total: (64.77%); Male: (71.06%); Female: (58.29%)
- Time zone: UTC+5 (PST)
- Area code: 040
- Tehsils: Sahiwal; Chichawatni
- Website: sahiwal.punjab.gov.pk

Sahiwal District (Punjabi and Urdu: ضِلع ساہِيوال), formerly known as Montgomery District, is a district in the Punjab province of Pakistan.

In 1998, it had a population of 1,843,194 people, of which 16.27% resided in urban areas. Since 2008, Sahiwal District, Okara District, and Pakpattan District have comprised the Sahiwal Division. The city of Sahiwal is the administrative headquarter of the district and the division.

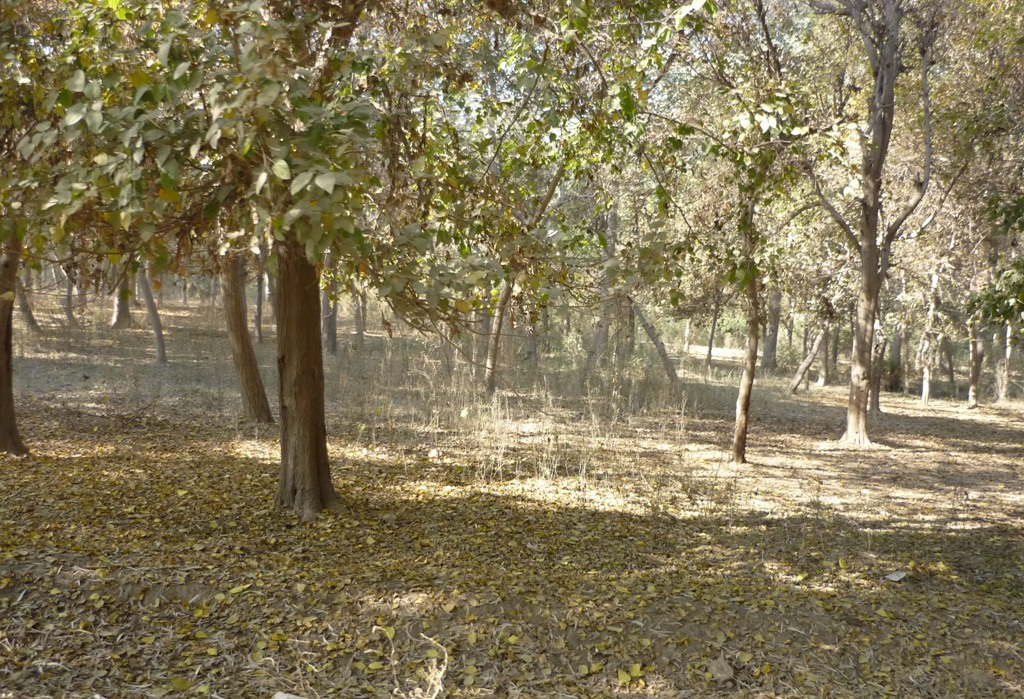
Forested land in Sahiwal District

== History ==
The Sahiwal District has been settled from the pre-historical era. Harappa is an archaeological site, about 35 km (22 mi) west of Sahiwal, that was built approximately 2600 BCE. The area was part of South Asian empires and at the crossroads of migrations and invasions from Central Asia.

Sahiwal District was an agricultural region with forests during the Indus Valley Civilization. The Vedic period is characterized by Indo-Aryan culture which split from Indo-Iranian culture and founded in Northern Indian subcontinent. The Kambojas, Daradas, Kaikayas, Madras, Pauravas, Yaudheyas, Malavas and Kurus invaded, settled and ruled the ancient Punjab region.

After overrunning the Achaemenid Empire in 331 BCE, Alexander marched into present-day Punjab region with an army of 50,000. Sahiwal was ruled by the Maurya Empire, Indo-Greek kingdom, Kushan Empire, Gupta Empire, White Huns, Kushano-Hephthalites and the Turk and Hindu Shahi kingdoms. From the beginning of the 7th century Rajput kingdoms dominated Eastern portions of Pakistan and northern India. In 997 CE, Sultan Mahmud Ghaznavi, took over the Ghaznavid dynasty empire established by his father, Sultan Sebuktegin, In 1005 he conquered the Shahis in Kabul in 1005, and followed it by the conquests of some western Punjab region. Eastern Regions of Punjab from Multan to the Rawalpindi in north (Including region of present-day Sahiwal) remained under Rajput rule until 1193. The Delhi Sultanate and Mughal Empire later ruled the region.

The Punjab region became predominantly Muslim due to missionary Sufi saints whose dargahs dot the landscape of Punjab region.

The pastoral tribes of this barren expanse did not appear to have paid more than a nominal allegiance to the Muslim rulers; the population for the most part remained in a chronic state of rebellion. After the decline of the Mughal Empire, this area became part of the Sikh Empire. The district came under direct British rule in 1849, when the district was officially formed with its headquarters at Pakpattan. The district was expanded to include the trans-Ravi portion in 1852, and the district headquarters were moved to Gugera. In 1865, when the railway was opened, a village on the railway, was named Montgomery and became the capital of the district. During the period of British rule, Sahiwal district increased in population and importance.

During the Indian Rebellion of 1857, there was a general rising of the Rajput clans, the district formed the scene of the only rising which took place north of the Sutlej. Before the end of May 1857, emissaries from Delhi crossed the river from Sirsa and Hissar, where open rebellion was already rife, and met with a ready reception from the Kharrals and other Rajput clans. The district authorities, however, kept down the threatened rising till 26 August 1857 when jail prisoners made a desperate attempt to break loose. At the same time Rai Ahmad Khan, a famous Kharral leader, who had been detained at Gugera, broke his arrest and, though apprehended, was released on security, together with several other suspected chieftains. On 16 September they fled to their homes, and the whole country rose in open rebellion.

Kot Kamalia was sacked. Major Chamberlain, moving up with a small force from Multan, was besieged for some days at Chichawatni on the Ravi. The situation at the civil station remained critical till Colonel Paton arrived with substantial reinforcements from Lahore. An attack which took place immediately after their arrival was repulsed. Several minor actions followed in the open field, until finally the rebels, driven from the plain into the wildest jungles of the interior, were utterly defeated and dispersed. The British troops then inflicted severe punishment on the insurgent clans, destroying their villages, and seizing large numbers of cattle for sale.

The region was traversed by the main line of the North Western Railway, from Lahore to Multan. It is irrigated by the Upper Sutlej inundation canal system and from the Ravi. The Rechna Doab was long home to the pastoral Jats, who had constantly maintained a sturdy independence against the successive rulers of northern India. The sites of Kot Kamalia and Harappa contain large mounds of antique bricks and other ruins left by the Indus Valley civilisation, while many other remains of ancient cities or villages lie scattered along the river bank, or dotted the then-barren stretches of the central waste.

The district comprised three towns and 1371 villages. Its population was 360,445 (1868), 426,529 (1881), 499,521 (1891) and 497,706 (1901). In 1901, 72% of the population were Muslims, while Hindus and Sikhs formed 28%.

The district was part of the Lahore Division of Punjab. After the independence of Pakistan in 1947, the minority Hindus and Sikhs migrated to India while the Muslim refugees from India settled in the Sahiwal region.

== Demographics ==
=== Population ===
Historical population
Year	Pop.	±% p.a.
1951	603,782	—
1961	743,614	+2.10%
1972	944,656	+2.20%
1981	1,281,526	+3.45%
1998	1,843,194	+2.16%
2017	2,513,011	+1.64%
2023	2,881,811	+2.31%

As of the 2023 census, Sahiwal district has 446,606 households and a population of 2,881,811. The district has a sex ratio of 102.80 males to 100 females and a literacy rate of 64.77%: 71.06% for males and 58.29% for females. 772,183 (26.83% of the surveyed population) are under 10 years of age. 757,631 (26.29%) live in urban areas.

=== Religion ===
Religion in Sahiwal district (2023)
Religion	Percent
Islam	97.54%
Christianity	2.41%
Other or not stated	0.05%

Religion in contemporary Sahiwal District
Religious group	1941		2017		2023	
Religious group	Pop.	%	Pop.	%	Pop.	%
Islam	289,161	67.56%	2,450,369	97.51%	2,807,329	97.54%
Hinduism (Note: 1931-1941: Including Ad-Dharmis)	71,018	16.59%	297	0.01%	217	0.01%
Sikhism	55,258	12.91%	—N/a	—N/a	44	0%
Christianity	12,265	2.87%	59,311	2.36%	69,506	2.41%
Ahmadi	—N/a	—N/a	714	0.03%	623	0.02%
Others	327	0.08%	2,320	0.09%	403	0.01%
Total Population	428,029	100%	2,513,011	100%	2,878,122	100%
Note: 1941 census data is for Montgomery tehsil of the former Montgomery District, which roughly corresponds to contemporary Sahiwal district. District and tehsil borders have changed since 1941.

Religious groups in Sahiwal District (British Punjab province era)
Religious group	1881		1891		1901		1911		1921		1931		1941	
Religious group	Pop.	%	Pop.	%	Pop.	%	Pop.	%	Pop.	%	Pop.	%	Pop.	%
Islam	330,495	77.48%	361,923	72.45%	334,474	72.15%	399,723	74.67%	513,055	71.88%	697,542	69.77%	918,564	69.11%
Hinduism	83,974	19.69%	121,481	24.32%	109,945	23.72%	66,803	12.48%	94,791	13.28%	136,783	13.68%	210,966	15.87%
Sikhism	11,964	2.8%	16,032	3.21%	19,092	4.12%	68,175	12.74%	95,520	13.38%	148,155	14.82%	175,064	13.17%
Christianity	93	0.02%	85	0.02%	66	0.01%	581	0.11%	10,408	1.46%	17,245	1.72%	24,432	1.84%
Zoroastrianism	2	0%	0	0%	1	0%	4	0%	0	0%	7	0%	4	0%
Jainism	1	0%	0	0%	8	0%	13	0%	12	0%	38	0%	49	0%
Buddhism	0	0%	0	0%	0	0%	0	0%	0	0%	2	0%	3	0%
Judaism	—N/a	—N/a	0	0%	0	0%	0	0%	0	0%	0	0%	0	0%
Others	0	0%	0	0%	0	0%	0	0%	0	0%	0	0%	21	0%
Total population	426,529	100%	499,521	100%	463,586	100%	535,299	100%	713,786	100%	999,772	100%	1,329,103	100%
Note1: British Punjab province era district borders are not an exact match in the present-day due to various bifurcations to district borders — which since created new districts — throughout the historic Punjab Province region during the post-independence era that have taken into account population increases. Note2: Formerly known as Montgomery District, prior to district renaming in 1978.

Religion in the Tehsils of Sahiwal District (1921)
Tehsil	Islam		Hinduism		Sikhism		Christianity		Jainism		Others (Note: Including Buddhism, Zoroastrianism, Judaism, Tribals, others, or not stated)		Total	
Tehsil	Pop.	%	Pop.	%	Pop.	%	Pop.	%	Pop.	%	Pop.	%	Pop.	%
Montgomery Tehsil	156,965	70.49%	37,080	16.65%	23,737	10.66%	4,887	2.19%	6	0%	0	0%	222,675	100%
Okara Tehsil	104,015	69.94%	15,091	10.15%	24,481	16.46%	5,123	3.44%	6	0%	0	0%	148,716	100%
Dipalpur Tehsil	151,572	75.42%	20,106	10%	29,210	14.53%	90	0.04%	0	0%	0	0%	200,978	100%
Pakpattan Tehsil	100,503	71.07%	22,514	15.92%	18,092	12.79%	308	0.22%	0	0%	0	0%	141,417	100%
Note: British Punjab province era tehsil borders are not an exact match in the present-day due to various bifurcations to tehsil borders — which since created new tehsils — throughout the historic Punjab Province region during the post-independence era that have taken into account population increases.

Religion in the Tehsils of Sahiwal District (1941)
Tehsil	Islam		Hinduism		Sikhism		Christianity		Jainism		Others (Note: Including Anglo-Indian Christians, British Christians, Buddhism, Zoroastrianism, Judaism, Tribals, others, or not stated)		Total	
Tehsil	Pop.	%	Pop.	%	Pop.	%	Pop.	%	Pop.	%	Pop.	%	Pop.	%
Montgomery Tehsil	289,161	67.56%	71,018	16.59%	55,258	12.91%	12,265	2.87%	33	0.01%	294	0.07%	428,029	100%
Okara Tehsil	203,602	69.58%	41,008	14.01%	39,682	13.56%	8,288	2.83%	10	0%	37	0.01%	292,627	100%
Dipalpur Tehsil	210,835	76.68%	37,743	13.73%	26,077	9.48%	314	0.11%	0	0%	3	0%	274,972	100%
Pakpattan Tehsil	214,966	64.46%	61,197	18.35%	54,047	16.21%	3,234	0.97%	6	0%	25	0.01%	333,475	100%
Note1: British Punjab province era tehsil borders are not an exact match in the present-day due to various bifurcations to tehsil borders — which since created new tehsils — throughout the historic Punjab Province region during the post-independence era that have taken into account population increases. Note2: Tehsil religious breakdown figures for Christianity only includes local Christians, labeled as "Indian Christians" on census. Does not include Anglo-Indian Christians or British Christians, who were classified under "Other" category.

=== Language ===
Languages of Sahiwal district (2023)
1. Punjabi (97.0%)
2. Urdu (2.28%)
3. Others (0.77%)

At the time of the 2023 census, 96.95% of the population spoke Punjabi and 2.28% Urdu as their first language.

== Location ==
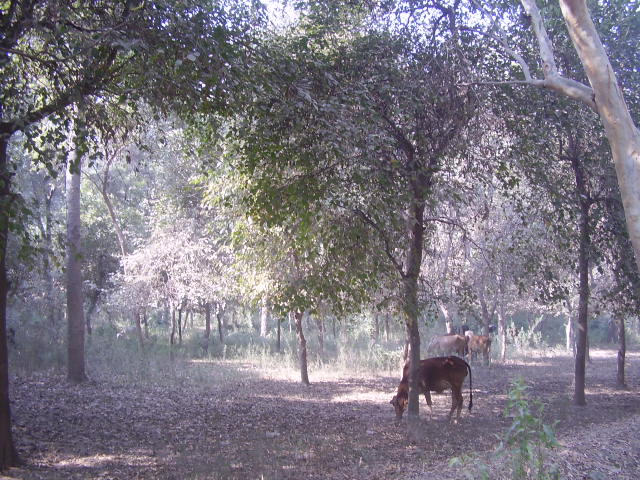
Scenic Jungle in Division Sahiwal

Sahiwal Division is in the southeast of Punjab. From Multan Division it lies between 30 and 40 north latitude and 73-06 longitude. It is 500 ft (150 m) above sea level. It forms a parallelogram lying NE-SW along the River Ravi. It is 100 km from east to west and 45 km from the north-western boundary of the Division of Sahiwal, Division Faisalabad, District Toba Tek Singh. The dry River Khushak Bias separates it from the District Pakpattan. Okara District is east of the division. District Khanewal and District Vehari form boundaries with the division. On the southern side is Pakpattan District, where there is a shrine of the Sufi Fareed Shaker Gunj.

== Administration ==
Sahiwal District consists of 531 villages in two subdivisions.

Tehsil	Area (km²)	Pop. (2023)	Density (ppl/km²) (2023)	Literacy rate (2023)	Union Councils
Chichawatni	1,591	1,155,978	726.57	65.25%	...
Sahiwal	1,610	1,725,833	1,071.95	64.44%	...

It is on the main bypass, 3 kilometers from the main city. Sahiwal Division has an area of 301 km^{2}. Sahiwal Division contains subtowns like Qadirabad, Yousafwala, Iqbal Nagar, Kassowal, Noorshah, Harappa and Ghaziabad. There are transport connections via Highway Services and Pakistan Railways to all over Pakistan.

== District Administration Officers ==
Deputy Commissioners (DC)
Name	Cadre	Date of Joining	Date of Relinquish of Charge
Wajid Ali Shah	PAS	26-Aug-2021	Now
Babar Bashir	PAS	Aug-2020	25-Aug-2021

== Sahiwal dairy cattle breed ==
The Sahiwal cattle breed is the best dairy breed of zebu or humped cattle (Bos Indicus), followed by the very similar Red Sindhi and Butana breeds. It originated in the dry Punjab region which lies along the Indo-Pakistani border and was once kept in large herds by herdsmen called "Jaanglees." With the introduction of irrigation to the region their numbers dripped, and farmers used them as draft and dairy animals. The Division Sahiwal has one of the best dairy breeds in India and Pakistan. It is tick-resistant, heat-tolerant and resistant to internal and external parasites. Cows average 2270 kilograms of milk while suckling a calf and much higher milk yields have been recorded. Due to their heat tolerance and high milk production they have been exported to other Asian countries, Africa, Caribbean and around the world. As oxen, they are docile and slow, making them more useful for slow work.

Their colour can range from reddish brown to red, with varying amounts of white on the neck, and the underline. In males, the colour darkens towards the extremities, such as the head, legs and tails. Sahiwal breed arrived in Australia via New Guinea in the early 1950s. In Australia, the Sahiwal breed was initially selected as a dual-purpose breed. It played a valuable role in the development of the two Australian tropical dairy breeds, the Australian milking zebu and the Australian Friesian Sahiwal. Sahiwal breeds are now used in Australia for beef production, as crossing high-grade Sahiwal sires with Bos taurus animals produced a carcass of lean quality with desirable fat cover.

The Sahiwal breed is the heaviest milker of all zebu breeds and displays a well-developed udder. It sires small, fast-growing calves and is noted for its hardiness under unfavourable climatic conditions.

== Harappa ==
One of the ancient civilizations on archaeological evidence dated 3300 B.C. 15 miles (24 km) southwest from downtown in suburb of Harapa which was the northern city of Indus Valley Civilization. Harrapa is now a large village in the Sahiwal Division of Punjab, 15 miles (24 km) southwest of the district capital. Archaeologists think that in ancient times Harappa was the urban centre in the upper Indus region, much like Mohenjo-daro dominated the lower Indus Valley and Ganweriwal might have been the urban centre for what is now Rajasthan. The site at Harappa was first excavated by archaeologist Alexander Cunningham in 1872–73, two decades after Brick Robbers carried off the visible remains of the city. He found an Indus seal of an unknown origin.

The first extensive excavations at Harappa were started by Rai Bahadur Daya Ram Sahni in 1920. His excavations at Mohenjo-daro called attention to the Indus Valley civilization as one of the earliest urban culture in the Indian subcontinent. His work was followed later in the decade by that of Madho Sarup Vats, also of the Archaeological Survey of India. Excavations continued in the 1930s. In 1946, Sir Mortimer Wheeler excavated the fortification walls and found the first pre-Indus Valley civilization (Kot Dijian) deposits. After Independence in 1947, Harappa was excavated by Mohammed Rafique Mughal of the Archaeological Survey Department of Pakistan in 1966.

In 1986, the first systematic, multi-disciplinary excavations of an Indus Valley city were begun by the Harappa Archaeological Project (HARP), under the direction of George F. Dales and Jonathan Mark Kenoyer. The main features of the plan, the citadel on the west and the mounds of the 'lower city' towards the east and southeast have already been indicated. To the north, a hollowed belt containing green crops marks an old bed of the River Ravi, which today flows six miles (10 km) further north between the citadel and the riverbed, Mound F contains much of the town planning; to the south of the citadel lie the outlying hills, the Harappan cemetery and the post Harappan cemetery. To the southeast, sporadic digging has been carried out in Area G, but the ragged Mound E and its surroundings are unexplored. Most of the site remains unexcavated. The earliest deposits on the site go back to 5300 B.C. and the area seems to have been continuously inhabited ever since.

== Climate ==
The climate of Sahiwal Division is extremely hot, reaching 45–50 degrees Celsius max in summers, and cold in winter down to 5-10-degree Celsius. The soil of the division is very fertile. The average rainfall is about 500-600 mm.

== Sports ==
Sahiwal has produced many cricketers, such as Mushtaaq Ahmed, Manzoor Elahi, Zahoor Elahi and Saleem Elahi.

== Notable residents ==
- Begum Sarwat Imtiaz, Pakistan's first female Lambardar
- Abdus Salam, Pakistan's first Nobel Prize winner, was born in Santokdas, Division Sahiwal, although he grew up in Jhang. He was awarded the 1979 Nobel Prize in Physics for his achievements in theoretical particle physics. He is buried in Rabwah, in the Chiniot district.
- Majeed Amjad, one of the founding forefathers of modern Urdu literature, was born in Sahiwal and received his education from Government College Lahore. He was inspired by the greenery of Sahiwal and wrote about its trees and greenery. There is a park named for him.

=== Education ===
- Divisional Public School and College
- Concordia College for boys
- Govt. Post Graduate College Sahiwal
- Army Public School, Sahiwal
- Comsats University Islamabad, Sahiwal Campus

== See also ==
- Rajkot, Sahiwal District
