= Bahawalpur Division =

Bahawalpur Division بہاولپور ڈویژن بہاول پور ڈویژن
- Division
- Map of Bahawalpur Division
- Country: Pakistan
- Province: (Punjab, Pakistan) Punjab
- Headquarters: Bahawalpur

Government
  - Type: Divisional Administration
  - Commissioner: N/A
  - Regional Police Officer: N/A

Area
  - Division: 45,588 km^{2} (17,602 sq mi)

Population (2023)
  - Division: 13,400,009
  - Density: 293.94/km^{2} (761.3/sq mi)
  - Urban: 3,935,691 (29.37%)
  - Rural: 9,464,318 (70.63%)

Literacy
  - Literacy rate: Total: (52.13%); Male: (58.78%); Female: (45.04%)
- Website: bahawalpurdivision.punjab.gov.pk

Bahawalpur Division (Punjabi: بہاولپور ڈویژن; Urdu: بہاول پور ڈویژن) is an administrative division of the Punjab Province, Pakistan. The reforms of 2000 abolished the third tier of government but division system was restored again in 2008.

== Districts ==
#	District	Capital	Area (km^{2})	Pop. (2023)	Density (ppl/km^{2}) (2023)	Lit. rate (2023)
1	Rahim Yar Khan	Rahim Yar Khan	11,880	5,564,703	468.2	47.94%
2	Bahawalnagar	Bahawalnagar	8,878	3,550,342	399.6	57.01%
3	Bahawalpur	Bahawalpur	24,830	4,284,964	172.3	53.35%

== List of the Tehsils ==
#	Tehsil	Area (km^{2})	Pop. (2023)	Density (ppl/km^{2}) (2023)	Lit. rate (2023)	District
1	Bahawalnagar	1,729	976,049	564.52	53.5%	Bahawalnagar
2	Chishtian	1,500	845,439	563.63	60.49%	Bahawalnagar
3	Fort Abbas	2,536	510,253	201.20	61.36%	Bahawalnagar
4	Haroonabad	1,295	615,476	475.27	66.28%	Bahawalnagar
5	Minchinabad	1,818	603,125	331.75	44.05%	Bahawalnagar
6	Ahmadpur East	1,738	1,307,578	752.35	39.68%	Bahawalpur
7	Bahawalpur City	1,490	815,202	547.12	71.67%	Bahawalpur
8	Bahawalpur Saddar	745	675,950	907.32	52.56%	Bahawalpur
9	Hasilpur	1,490	508,415	341.22	59.64%	Bahawalpur
10	Khairpur Tamewali	993	290,582	292.63	45.82%	Bahawalpur
11	Yazman	18,374	687,237	37.40	53.55%	Bahawalpur
12	Khanpur	3,190	1,169,138	366.50	50.08%	Rahim Yar Khan
13	Liaqatpur	3,262	1,235,264	378.68	38.35%	Rahim Yar Khan
14	Rahim Yar Khan	2,464	1,778,542	721.81	53.66%	Rahim Yar Khan
15	Sadiqabad	2,964	1,381,759	466.18	47.04%	Rahim Yar Khan

== Demographics ==
=== Population ===
Historical population
Year	Pop.	±% p.a.
1951	N/A	—
1961	N/A	—
1972	N/A	—
1981	N/A	—
1998	7,635,591	—
2017	11,464,031	+2.16%
2023	13,400,009	+2.63%

According to the 2023 census, Bahawalpur division has a population of 13,400,009 roughly equal to the nation of Senegal or the US state of Pennsylvania.

=== Language ===
Languages of Bahawalpur Division (2023)
1. Saraiki (49.1%)
2. Punjabi (42.6%)
3. Urdu (3.85%)
4. Others (4.45%)

According to 2023 census, Saraiki and Punjabi are the most commonly spoken languages in the division, with 49.1% and 42.60% of the population respectively.

=== Religion ===
Islam is the most commonly practiced religion in the division.

Religious groups in Bahawalpur State (British Punjab province era)
Religious group	1881		1891		1901		1911		1921		1931		1941	
Religious group	Pop.	%	Pop.	%	Pop.	%	Pop.	%	Pop.	%	Pop.	%	Pop.	%
Islam	480,274	83.75%	546,680	84.1%	598,139	82.97%	654,247	83.81%	647,207	82.85%	799,176	81.17%	1,098,814	81.93%
Hinduism (Note: 1931-1941: Including Ad-Dharmis)	91,272	15.92%	90,013	13.85%	114,670	15.91%	109,548	14.03%	114,621	14.67%	149,454	15.18%	174,408	13%
Sikhism	1,678	0.29%	13,321	2.05%	7,985	1.11%	16,630	2.13%	19,071	2.44%	34,896	3.54%	46,945	3.5%
Jainism	254	0.04%	17	0%	0	0%	15	0%	1	0%	12	0%	351	0.03%
Christianity	13	0%	11	0%	83	0.01%	199	0.03%	283	0.04%	1,054	0.11%	3,048	0.23%
Zoroastrianism	3	0%	0	0%	0	0%	2	0%	8	0%	20	0%	0	0%
Buddhism	0	0%	0	0%	0	0%	0	0%	0	0%	0	0%	0	0%
Judaism	—N/a	—N/a	0	0%	0	0%	0	0%	0	0%	0	0%	0	0%
Others	0	0%	0	0%	0	0%	0	0%	0	0%	0	0%	17,643	1.32%
Total population	573,494	100%	650,042	100%	720,877	100%	780,641	100%	781,191	100%	984,612	100%	1,341,209	100%
Note1: British Punjab province era district borders are not an exact match in the present-day due to various bifurcations to district borders — which since created new districts — throughout the historic Punjab Province region during the post-independence era that have taken into account population increases. Note2: British Punjab province era figures are for the princely state, as the contemporary division borders roughly mirror the historic colonial-era state borders.

== Constituencies ==
Provincial Assembly Constituency	National Assembly Constituency	District
PP-237 Bahawalnagar-I	NA-160 Bahawalnagar-I	Bahawalnagar
PP-238 Bahawalnagar-II	NA-160 Bahawalnagar-I	Bahawalnagar
PP-239 Bahawalnagar-III	NA-161 Bahawalnagar-II	Bahawalnagar
PP-240 Bahawalnagar-IV	NA-161 Bahawalnagar-II	Bahawalnagar
PP-243 Bahawalnagar-VII	NA-162 Bahawalnagar-III	Bahawalnagar
PP-244 Bahawalnagar-VIII	NA-162 Bahawalnagar-III	Bahawalnagar
PP-241 Bahawalnagar-V	NA-163 Bahawalnagar-IV	Bahawalnagar
PP-242 Bahawalnagar-VI	NA-163 Bahawalnagar-IV	Bahawalnagar
PP-245 Bahawalpur-I	NA-164 Bahawalpur-I	Bahawalpur
PP-246 Bahawalpur-II	NA-164 Bahawalpur-I	Bahawalpur
PP-247 Bahawalpur-III	NA-165 Bahawalpur-II	Bahawalpur
PP-248 Bahawalpur-IV	NA-165 Bahawalpur-II	Bahawalpur
PP-249 Bahawalpur-V	NA-166 Bahawalpur-III	Bahawalpur
PP-250 Bahawalpur-VI	NA-166 Bahawalpur-III	Bahawalpur
PP-251 Bahawalpur-VII	NA-167 Bahawalpur-IV	Bahawalpur
PP-252 Bahawalpur-VIII	NA-167 Bahawalpur-IV	Bahawalpur
PP-253 Bahawalpur-IX	NA-168 Bahawalpur-V	Bahawalpur
PP-254 Bahawalpur-X	NA-168 Bahawalpur-V	Bahawalpur
PP-255 Rahim Yar Khan-I	NA-169 Rahim Yar Khan-I	Rahim Yar Khan
PP-256 Rahim Yar Khan-II	NA-169 Rahim Yar Khan-I	Rahim Yar Khan
PP-257 Rahim Yar Khan-III	NA-170 Rahim Yar Khan-II	Rahim Yar Khan
PP-258 Rahim Yar Khan-IV	NA-170 Rahim Yar Khan-II	Rahim Yar Khan
PP-259 Rahim Yar Khan-V	NA-171 Rahim Yar Khan-III	Rahim Yar Khan
PP-260 Rahim Yar Khan-VI	NA-171 Rahim Yar Khan-III	Rahim Yar Khan
PP-261 Rahim Yar Khan-VII	NA-172 Rahim Yar Khan-IV	Rahim Yar Khan
PP-264 Rahim Yar Khan-X	NA-172 Rahim Yar Khan-IV	Rahim Yar Khan
PP-267 Rahim Yar Khan-XIII	NA-172 Rahim Yar Khan-IV	Rahim Yar Khan
PP-262 Rahim Yar Khan-VIII	NA-173 Rahim Yar Khan-V	Rahim Yar Khan
PP-263 Rahim Yar Khan-IX	NA-173 Rahim Yar Khan-V	Rahim Yar Khan
PP-265 Rahim Yar Khan-XI	NA-174 Rahim Yar Khan-VI	Rahim Yar Khan
PP-266 Rahim Yar Khan-XII	NA-174 Rahim Yar Khan-VI	Rahim Yar Khan

== See also ==
- Divisions of Pakistan
  - Divisions of Balochistan, Pakistan
  - Divisions of Khyber Pakhtunkhwa
  - Divisions of Sindh, Pakistan
  - Divisions of Azad Kashmir
  - Divisions of Gilgit-Baltistan
- Districts of Pakistan
  - Districts of Punjab, Pakistan
  - Districts of Sindh
  - Districts of Balochistan, Pakistan
  - Districts of Khyber Pakhtunkhwa
  - Districts of Azad Kashmir
  - Districts of Gilgit-Baltistan
- List of Tehsils of Punjab
- Kala Dhari Mandir
- Bahawalpur (princely state)
