= Bahawalpur (disambiguation) =

Bahawalpur is a city in Punjab, Pakistan.

Bahawalpur may also refer to:

== Places ==
- Bahawalpur District, a district in Pakistan
- Bahawalpur Tehsil, a tehsil of Bahawalpur district
- Bahawalpur (princely state), a former princely state during British Raj
- Bahawalpur South Punjab, a geographical region
- Bahawalpur Division, administrative unit of Punjab

== Transportation ==
- Bahawalpur Airport, an international airport
- Bahawalpur railway station, a railway station in Pakistan

== Sports ==
- Bahawalpur cricket team, a local team of Bahawalpur district
- Bahawalpur Stags, a name of a cricket team

== See also ==
- Bahawalpur Regiment, a former group of Pakistan Army
- Bahawalpur National Awami Party, a political group in Pakistan
