= Shafi (disambiguation) =

Shafi may refer to:

== Given name ==
- Al-Shafi'i (767–820), Muslim scholar
- Shafi (director) (1968–2025), Indian director
- Shafi (actor) (born 1980), Indian actor in Telugu cinema
- Shafi Ahmad Wani, Indian politician
- Shafi Ahmed (born 1969), Pakistani surgeon
- Shafi Ahmed Chowdhury (born 1938), Bangladeshi businessman and politician
- Shafi' bin Ali el-Masry (1251–1330), Egyptian writer
- Shafi Aqeel (1930–2013), Pakistani journalist
- Shafi Armar (1989/1991–2015), Indian Islamic militant
- Shafi Bikrampuri (1943–2023), Bangladeshi film director and producer
- Shafi Al-Dossari (born 1990), Saudi footballer
- Shafi Edu (1911–2002), Nigerian businessman
- Shafi Goldwasser (born 1959), Israeli-American computer scientist
- Shafi Hazara (1964–1996), Afghan military leader
- Shafi Imam Rumi (1951–1971), Bangladeshi guerilla fighter
- Shafi Inamdar (1945–1996), Indian actor
- Shafi Mazandarani (1744–1818/19), prime minister in Qajar Iran
- Shafi Muhammad, Pakistani politician
- Shafi Muhammad Burfat (born 1965), Pakistani politician
- Shafi Muhammad Jamot (1940–2019), Pakistani politician
- Shafi Muhammad Shah (1949–2007), Pakistani actor
- Shafi Parambil (born 1983), Indian politician
- Shafi Vazeh (1800–1852), Azerbaijani poet and teacher

== Surname ==
- Ali Shafi (1908–??), Egyptian footballer
- Amer Shafi (born 1982), Jordanian footballer
- Faris Shafi (born 1987), Pakistani rapper
- Meesha Shafi (born 1981), Pakistani-born Canadian singer, actress and model
- Mian Ejaz Shafi (died 2004), Pakistani industrialist and politician
- Muhammad Shafi, multiple people
- Muhammad Ejaz Shafi (born 1969), Pakistani politician
- Mushtari Shafi (1938–2021), Bangladeshi writer
- Nizar Shafi, Indian cinematographer
- Qaisar Shafi, British-American theoretical physicist
- Sajjad Shafi, Indian politician
- Shah Ahmad Shafi (1930–2020), Bangladeshi Islamic scholar
- Shah Ahmed Shafi (diplomat), Bangladeshi diplomat
- Shuhdi Atiya ash-Shafi (died 1960), Egyptian communist theoretician and activist

== Places ==
- Shafi, Iran, a village in Razavi Khorasan Province, Iran
- Shafi, Iraq, a town of Basrah Governorate in southern Iraq

== Other ==
- Shafi`i, one of the four schools of Islamic law in Sunni Islam

== See also ==
- Al-Shafiʽi (disambiguation)
