= Hinduism in Punjab, Pakistan =

Overview of the role and impact of Hinduism in the Pakistani province of Punjab

Punjabi Hindus of Pakistan
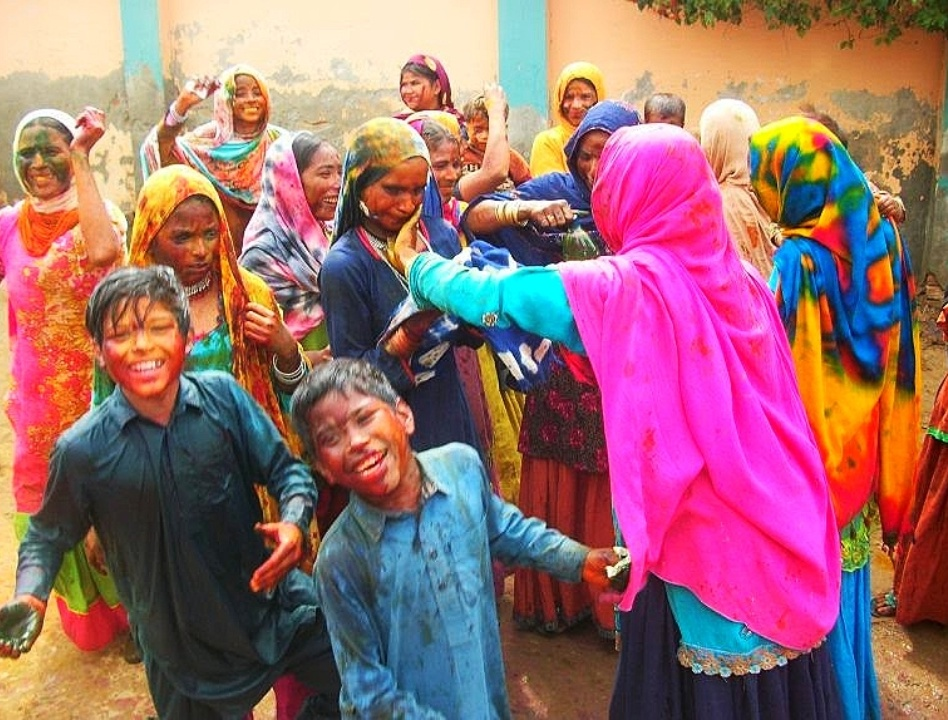
- Hindus in Cholistan celebrating Holi

Total population
- ▲249,716 (2023); 0.20% of total Province population

Religions
- Hinduism (majority); Nanakpanthi and Kalash

Scriptures
- Bhagavad Gita, and Vedas; Guru Granth Sahib (only by Nanakpanthi)

Languages
- Sanskrit (sacred); Punjabi, Marwari, Saraiki, Bagri; Hindi, Urdu and other languages (minority)

Hinduism is a minority religion in Punjab province of Pakistan followed by about 0.19% of its population. Punjab has the second largest number of Hindus in Pakistan after Sindh. Hinduism is followed mainly in the districts of Rahim Yar Khan, Bahawalpur, Bahawalnagar and Sialkot.

Hinduism has a strong historical presence in Punjab with many mandirs, shrines (samadhis), alongside various religious traditions and texts that were developed in the region. According to the 1941 census, Punjabi Hindus constituted approximately 13.7 percent of the population in the region that comprises the contemporary state of Punjab, Pakistan. (Note: 1941 figure taken from census data by combining the total population of all districts (Lahore, Sialkot, Gujranwala, Sheikhupura, Gujrat, Shahpur, Jhelum, Rawalpindi, Attock, Mianwali, Montgomery, Lyallpur, Jhang, Multan, Muzaffargargh, Dera Ghazi Khan), one tehsil (Shakargarh – then part of Gurdaspur District), one princely state (Bahawalpur), and one tract (Biloch Trans–Frontier) in Punjab Province, British India that ultimately fell on the western side of the Radcliffe Line. See 1941 census data here: Immediately following the partition of India in 1947, these districts and tract would ultimately make up the subdivision of West Punjab, which also later included Bahawalpur. The state that makes up this region in the contemporary era is Punjab, Pakistan.) With violence and religious cleansing accompanying the partition of India in 1947, the vast majority departed the region en masse, primarily migrating eastward to Delhi and the region of Punjab that would fall on the eastern side of the Radcliffe Line, in the contemporary Indian states of Punjab, Haryana, and Himachal Pradesh.

== History ==
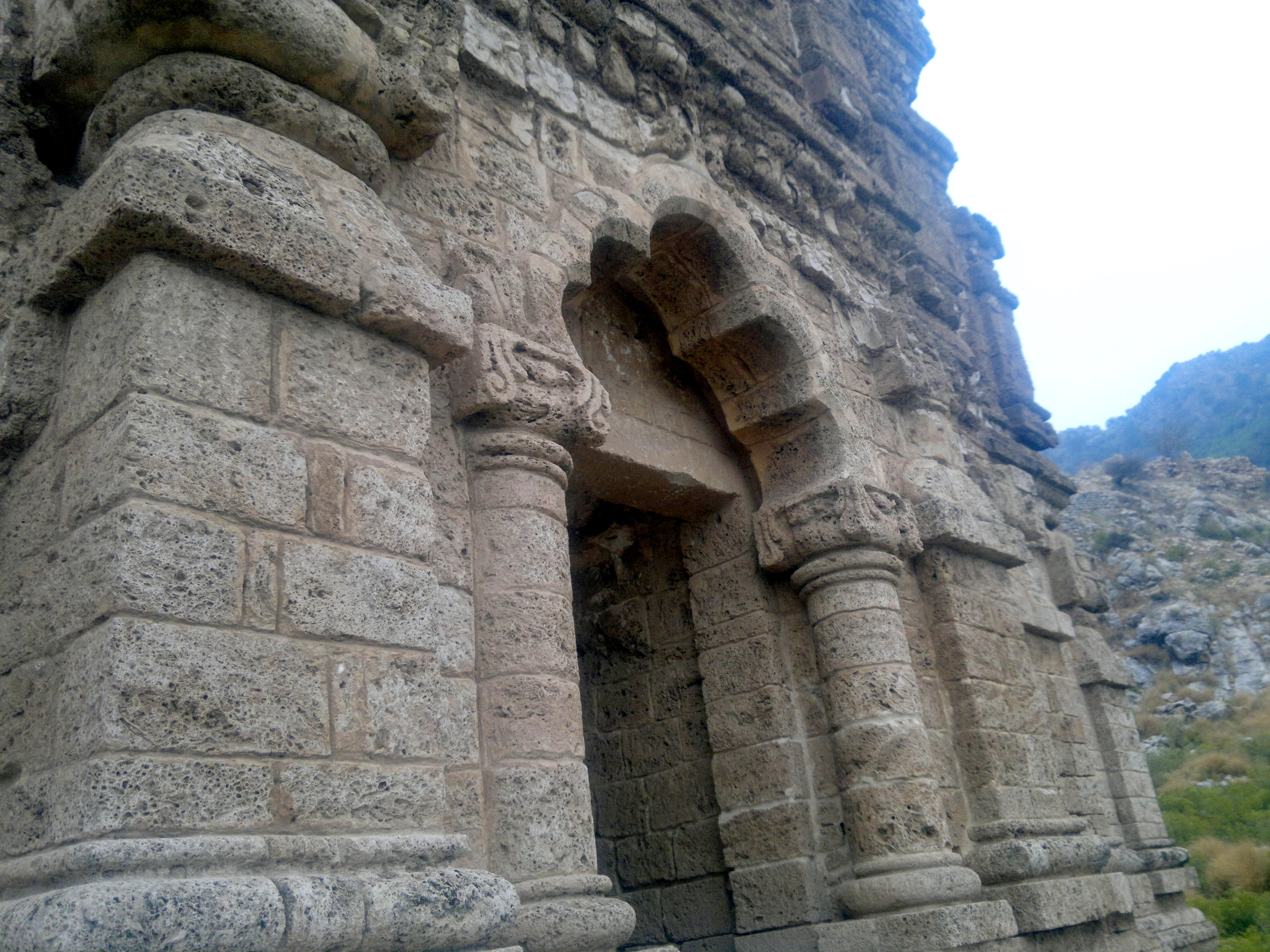
One of the Amb Temples constructed between the 7th and 9th centuries.

Hindu Population History Punjab, Pakistan
Year	Pop.	±% p.a.
1881	1,449,913	—
1901	1,944,363	+1.48%
1911	1,645,758	−1.65%
1921	1,797,141	+0.88%
1931	1,957,878	+0.86%
1941	2,373,466	+1.94%
1951	33,052	−34.78%
1998	116,410	+2.72%
2017	211,641	+3.20%
2023	249,716	+2.80%
Source: (Note: 1881 figure taken from census data by combining the total population of all districts (Lahore, Sialkot, Gujranwala, Gujrat, Shahpur, Jhelum, Rawalpindi, Montgomery, Jhang, Multan, Muzaffargargh, Dera Ghazi Khan), one tehsil (Shakargarh – then part of Gurdaspur District), and one princely state (Bahawalpur) in Punjab province, British India that ultimately fell on the western side of the Radcliffe Line. See 1881 census data here: Immediately following the partition of India in 1947, these districts and tract would ultimately make up the subdivision of West Punjab, which also later included Bahawalpur. The state that makes up this region in the contemporary era is Punjab, Pakistan.) (Note: 1901 figure taken from census data by combining the total population of all districts (Lahore, Sialkot, Gujranwala, Gujrat, Shahpur, Jhelum, Rawalpindi, Mianwali, Montgomery, Lyallpur (inscribed as the Chenab Colony on the 1901 census), Jhang, Multan, Muzaffargargh, Dera Ghazi Khan), one tehsil (Shakargarh – then part of Gurdaspur District), one princely state (Bahawalpur), and one tract (Biloch Trans–Frontier) in Punjab Province, British India that ultimately fell on the western side of the Radcliffe Line. See 1901 census data here: Immediately following the partition of India in 1947, these districts and tract would ultimately make up the subdivision of West Punjab, which also later included Bahawalpur. The state that makes up this region in the contemporary era is Punjab, Pakistan.) (Note: 1911 figure taken from census data by combining the total population of all districts (Lahore, Sialkot, Gujranwala, Gujrat, Shahpur, Jhelum, Rawalpindi, Attock, Mianwali, Montgomery, Lyallpur, Jhang, Multan, Muzaffargargh, Dera Ghazi Khan), one tehsil (Shakargarh – then part of Gurdaspur District), one princely state (Bahawalpur), and one tract (Biloch Trans–Frontier) in Punjab Province, British India that ultimately fell on the western side of the Radcliffe Line. See 1911 census data here: Immediately following the partition of India in 1947, these districts and tract would ultimately make up the subdivision of West Punjab, which also later included Bahawalpur. The state that makes up this region in the contemporary era is Punjab, Pakistan.) (Note: 1921 figure taken from census data by combining the total population of all districts (Lahore, Sialkot, Gujranwala, Sheikhupura, Gujrat, Shahpur, Jhelum, Rawalpindi, Attock, Mianwali, Montgomery, Lyallpur, Jhang, Multan, Muzaffargargh, Dera Ghazi Khan), one tehsil (Shakargarh – then part of Gurdaspur District), one princely state (Bahawalpur), and one tract (Biloch Trans–Frontier) in Punjab Province, British India that ultimately fell on the western side of the Radcliffe Line. See 1921 census data here: Immediately following the partition of India in 1947, these districts and tract would ultimately make up the subdivision of West Punjab, which also later included Bahawalpur. The state that makes up this region in the contemporary era is Punjab, Pakistan.) (Note: 1931 figure taken from census data by combining the total population of all districts (Lahore, Sialkot, Gujranwala, Sheikhupura, Gujrat, Shahpur, Jhelum, Rawalpindi, Attock, Mianwali, Montgomery, Lyallpur, Jhang, Multan, Muzaffargargh, Dera Ghazi Khan), one tehsil (Shakargarh – then part of Gurdaspur District), one princely state (Bahawalpur), and one tract (Biloch Trans–Frontier) in Punjab Province, British India that ultimately fell on the western side of the Radcliffe Line. See 1931 census data here: Immediately following the partition of India in 1947, these districts and tract would ultimately make up the subdivision of West Punjab, which also later included Bahawalpur. The state that makes up this region in the contemporary era is Punjab, Pakistan.); Census of India, Census of Pakistan

=== Ancient era ===
Hinduism is the oldest recorded religion practiced by the Punjabi people. The Rig Veda, the oldest and most sacred Hindu text, is believed to have been composed in the Punjab region of modern-day Pakistan (and India) on the banks of the Indus River around 1500 BCE. The Punjab region also features heavily in the Mahabharata. According to Hindu religious texts, Multan was founded by the Hindu sage Kashyapa and also asserts Multan as the capital of the Trigarta Kingdom ruled by the Katoch dynasty at the time of the Kurukshetra War that is central the Hindu epic poem, the Mahabharata. Historically, the Hindus of Punjab followed mainly a Brahminical form of Hinduism. The Prahladpuri Temple in Multan is believed to be constructed by Prahlada in honor of Narasimha. Most of the Hindus in Punjab once also had also influence of Sikhism on their culture and lifestyle. Nanakpanthis are the Hindus who follows the teaching of Sikh guru, Guru Nanak.

=== Colonial era ===
By the early 20th century, Western Punjab (present-day Punjab, Pakistan) had a Punjabi Muslim majority population (primarily supporting the Muslim League and Pakistan Movement) but also included significant Punjabi Hindu and Punjabi Sikh minority populations.

According to the 1941 census, Punjabi Hindus constituted approximately 13.7 percent of the population in the region that comprises the contemporary state of Punjab, Pakistan, numbering around 2.4 million persons. Following the partition of Punjab, according to the 1951 census, the Hindu population declined to 33,052 persons or 0.2 percent due to religious cleansing violence alongside large-scale mass migration and population transfer to East Punjab, India and Delhi in the violent events of partition of India.

With the formation of independent Pakistan and India during the partition of India in 1947, approximately 3 million Punjabi Hindus migrated to India.

== Demographics ==
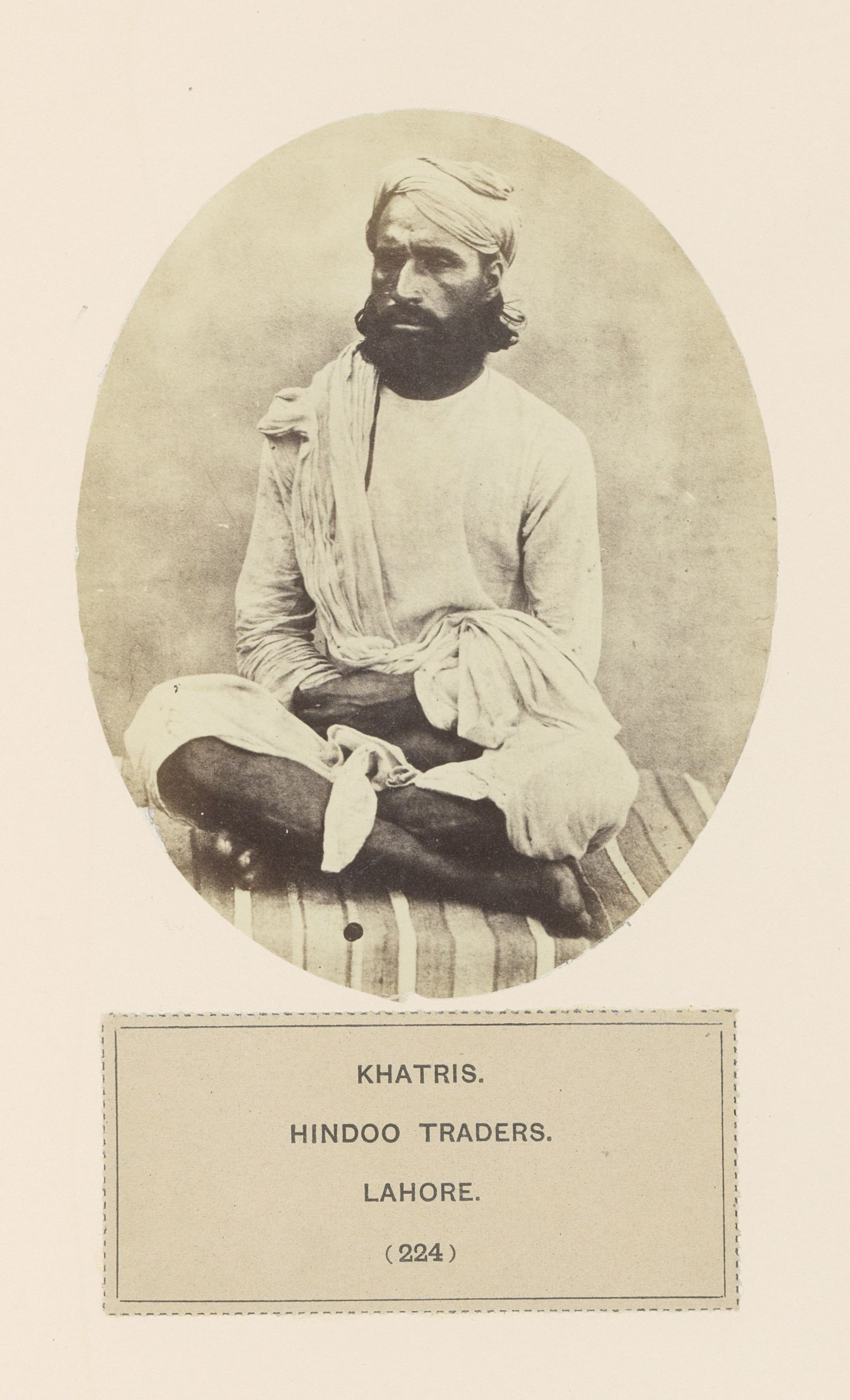
Hindu Khatri man, Lahore circa 1859-1869

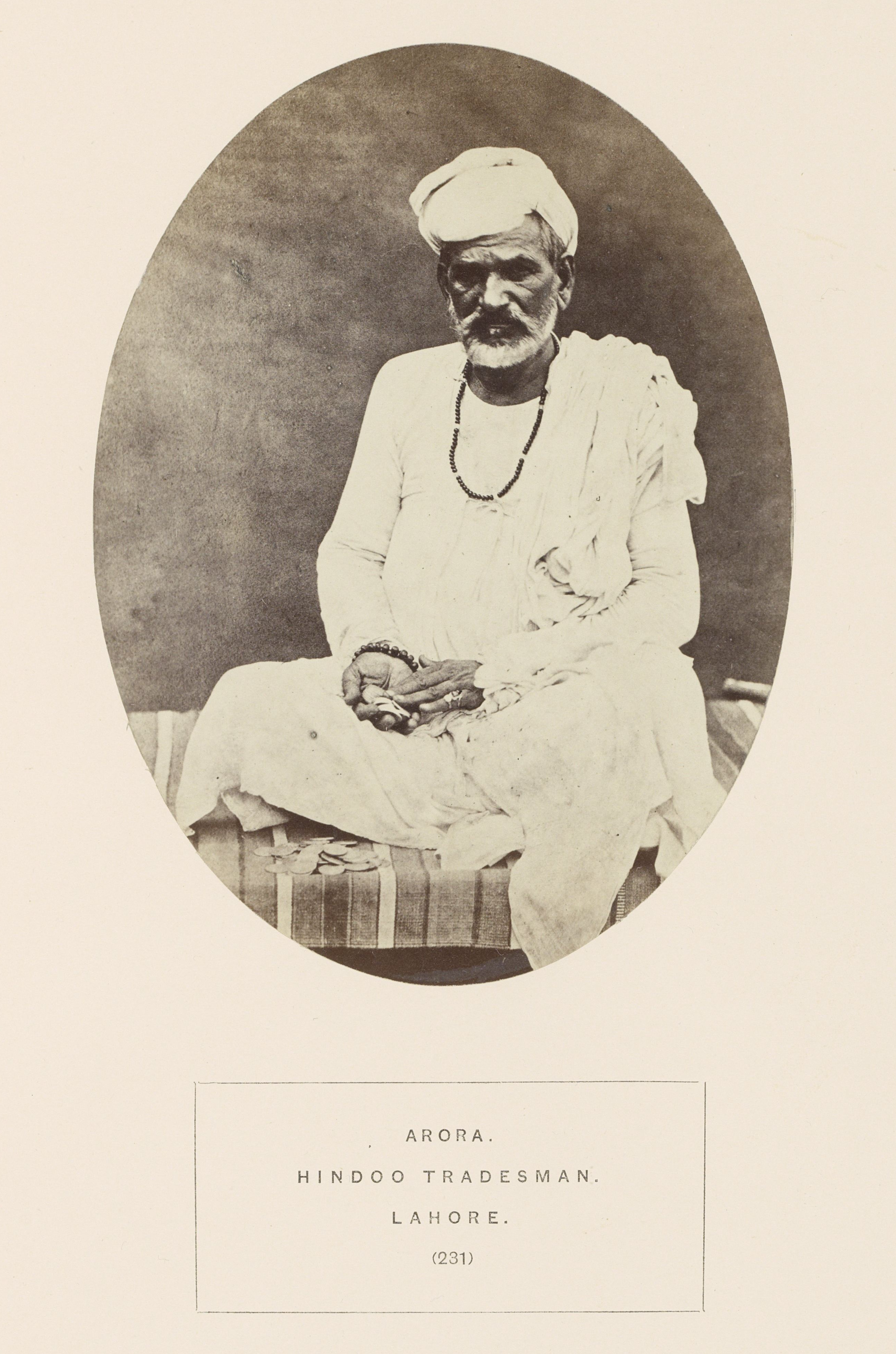
Hindu Arora Storekeeper, Lahore, circa 1862–72

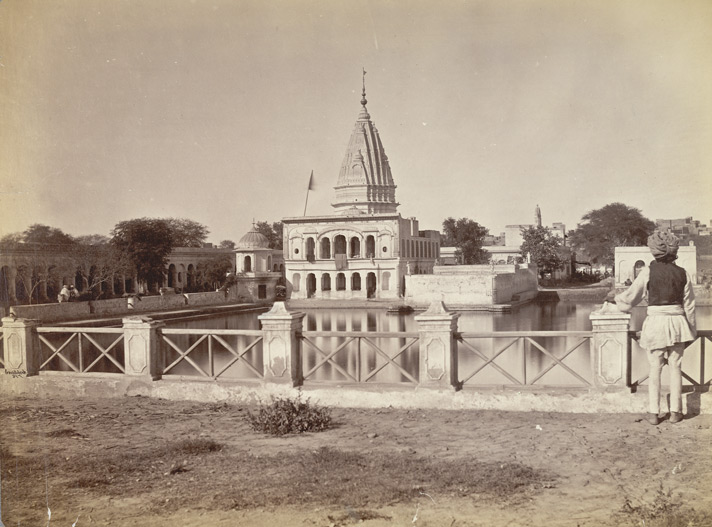
Rattan Chand temple, Lahore, 1880

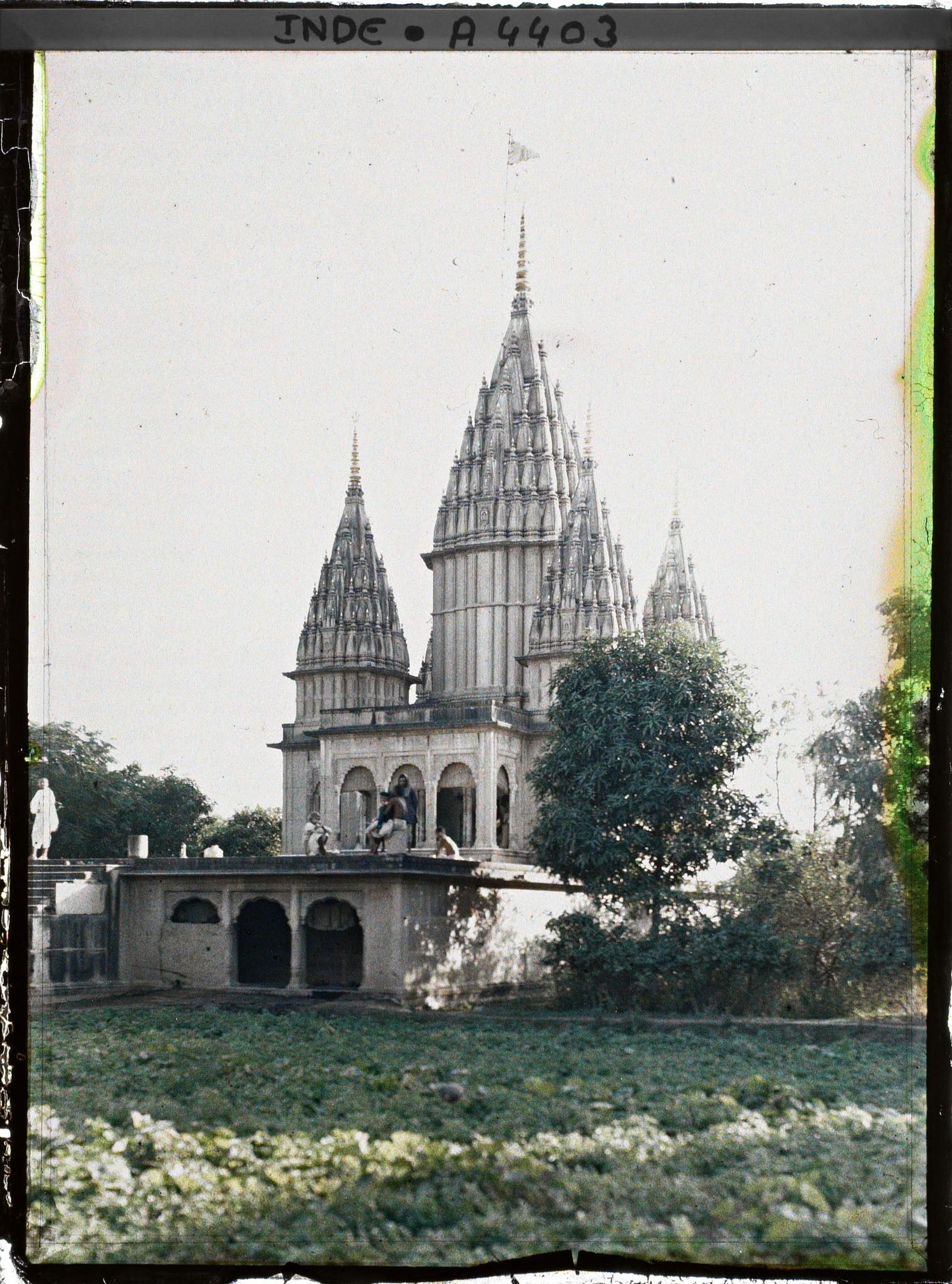
Hindu Shivite temple, Lahore, 1914

=== Colonial era ===
Hindus in the administrative divisions that compose the contemporary Punjab, Pakistan region (1881–1941)
District or Princely State	1881		1901		1911		1921		1931		1941	
District or Princely State	Pop.	%	Pop.	%	Pop.	%	Pop.	%	Pop.	%	Pop.	%
Sialkot District	299,311	29.57%	302,012	27.86%	242,325	24.74%	217,912	23.24%	206,421	21.07%	231,319	19.43%
Lahore District	193,319	20.92%	276,375	23.78%	217,609	21%	255,690	22.6%	259,725	18.84%	284,689	16.79%
Gujranwala District	127,322	20.64%	169,594	22.41%	176,075	19.07%	101,566	16.29%	92,764	12.6%	108,115	11.85%
Multan District	112,001	20.29%	133,560	18.79%	126,603	15.54%	134,013	15.05%	182,029	15.49%	249,872	16.83%
Shakargarh Tehsil (Note: Part of Gurdaspur District which was awarded to Pakistan as part of the Radcliffe Line.)	109,241	49.77%	111,819	47.69%	93,052	44.22%	90,645	42.59%	101,318	40.96%	116,553	39.98%
Bahawalpur State	91,272	15.92%	114,670	15.91%	109,548	14.03%	114,621	14.67%	149,454	15.18%	174,408	13%
Rawalpindi District	86,162	10.5%	86,269	9.27%	48,449	8.84%	57,185	10.05%	59,485	9.38%	82,478	10.5%
Montgomery District	83,974	19.69%	109,945	23.72%	66,803	12.48%	94,791	13.28%	136,783	13.68%	210,966	15.87%
Gujrat District	72,450	10.51%	69,346	9.24%	49,430	6.63%	62,529	7.59%	73,356	7.95%	84,643	7.66%
Jhang District	64,892	16.42%	79,650	21.03%	73,426	14.24%	85,339	14.96%	102,990	15.49%	129,889	15.81%
Jhelum District	60,949	10.34%	51,801	8.72%	34,261	6.7%	34,837	7.3%	36,068	6.67%	40,888	6.49%
Shahpur District	59,026	14%	68,489	13.06%	72,695	10.58%	82,182	11.42%	90,561	11.02%	102,172	10.23%
Dera Ghazi Khan District	46,697	12.85%	57,815	12.27%	56,485	11.3%	56,346	12.01%	57,217	11.65%	67,407	11.59%
Muzaffargarh District	43,297	12.79%	52,221	12.87%	68,158	11.97%	69,878	12.29%	72,577	12.27%	90,643	12.72%
Lyallpur District (Note: District formerly inscribed as the Chenab Colony on the 1901 census, later renamed to Lyallpur District, created between Jhang District, Gujranwala District, Lahore District, Montgomery District, and Multan District to account for the large population increase in the region, primarily due to the Chenab Canal Colony.)	—N/a	—N/a	210,459	26.58%	154,603	18.03%	181,488	18.53%	173,344	15.06%	204,059	14.61%
Mianwali District	—N/a	—N/a	50,202	11.82%	36,326	10.64%	45,974	12.83%	49,794	12.1%	62,814	12.41%
Biloch Trans–Frontier Tract	—N/a	—N/a	136	0.56%	169	0.59%	180	0.67%	173	0.58%	160	0.4%
Attock District (Note: District created in 1904 by taking Talagang Tehsil from Jhelum District and Pindi Gheb, Fateh Jang and Attock Tehsils from Rawalpindi District.)	—N/a	—N/a	—N/a	—N/a	19,741	3.8%	26,184	5.11%	31,932	5.47%	43,209	6.39%
Sheikhupura District (Note: District created between Gujranwala District, Sialkot District, Amritsar District, Lahore District, Montgomery District, and Lyallpur District in 1920 to account for the large population increase in the region, primarily due to the Chenab Canal Colony.)	—N/a	—N/a	—N/a	—N/a	—N/a	—N/a	85,781	16.4%	81,887	11.75%	89,182	10.46%
Total Hindus	1,449,913	18.26%	1,944,363	18.65%	1,645,758	14.82%	1,797,141	15.12%	1,957,878	13.94%	2,373,466	13.68%
Total Population	7,942,399	100%	10,427,765	100%	11,104,585	100%	11,888,985	100%	14,040,798	100%	17,350,103	100%

=== Modern era ===
According to the 2023 Census, Hinduism is followed by 0.2 percent of the population, which is roughly the same proportion as reported in the 2017 Census. There are 249,716 Hindus in Punjab. However according to the Pakistan Hindu Council, there are 349,230 Hindus in Punjab.

According to estimates in religious minorities in Pakistan's elections, there are above 50,000 or more in 11 districts in Pakistan. All of these are in Sindh except the Rahim Yar Khan District in Punjab and is the only district in Punjab with more than 2% of its population as Hindu.

About 90% of the Hindus in Punjab province live in Rahim Yar Khan and Bahawalpur.

Hindus in the administrative divisions in Punjab, Pakistan (1951–2023)
District	1951		2017		2023	
District	Pop.	%	Pop.	%	Pop.	%
Sialkot District	14,397	0.98%	2,870	0.07%	3,195	0.07%
Rahim Yar Khan District	10,755	1.26%	150,093	3.12%	176,416	3.17%
Lahore District	2,433	0.13%	2,670	0.02%	2,811	0.02%
Bahawalpur District	1,916	0.2%	41,051	1.12%	48,684	1.14%
Gujranwala District	1,211	0.12%	287	0.01%	1,033	0.02%
Faisalabad District	888	0.04%	598	0.01%	2,150	0.02%
Sheikhupura District	461	0.05%	323	0.01%	820	0.02%
Attock District	308	0.04%	575	0.03%	501	0.02%
Multan District	151	0.01%	2,366	0.05%	1,709	0.03%
Rawalpindi District	114	0.01%	1,244	0.02%	1,013	0.02%
Gujrat District	99	0.01%	120	0%	217	0.01%
Sahiwal District	90	0%	297	0.01%	217	0.01%
Jhelum District	72	0.01%	356	0.03%	343	0.03%
Jhang District	69	0.01%	195	0.01%	73	0%
Sargodha District	58	0%	141	0%	456	0.01%
Muzaffargarh District	24	0%	733	0.02%	716	0.01%
Dera Ghazi Khan District	6	0%	248	0.01%	166	0%
Mianwali District	0	0%	21	0%	63	0%
Bahawalnagar District	—N/a	—N/a	2,631	0.09%	3,106	0.09%
Rajanpur District	—N/a	—N/a	1,442	0.07%	1,030	0.04%
Narowal District	—N/a	—N/a	657	0.04%	833	0.04%
Layyah District	—N/a	—N/a	553	0.03%	252	0.01%
Mandi Bahauddin District	—N/a	—N/a	357	0.02%	326	0.02%
Khanewal District	—N/a	—N/a	297	0.01%	304	0.01%
Nankana Sahib District	—N/a	—N/a	245	0.02%	1,196	0.07%
Kasur District	—N/a	—N/a	243	0.01%	475	0.01%
Okara District	—N/a	—N/a	214	0.01%	214	0.01%
Chakwal District	—N/a	—N/a	187	0.01%	142	0.01%
Vehari District	—N/a	—N/a	179	0.01%	226	0.01%
Toba Tek Singh District	—N/a	—N/a	123	0.01%	279	0.01%
Pakpattan District	—N/a	—N/a	97	0.01%	61	0%
Lodhran District	—N/a	—N/a	93	0.01%	97	0.01%
Chiniot District	—N/a	—N/a	62	0%	132	0.01%
Hafizabad District	—N/a	—N/a	48	0%	380	0.03%
Bhakkar District	—N/a	—N/a	13	0%	25	0%
Khushab District	—N/a	—N/a	12	0%	55	0%
Total Hindus	33,052	0.16%	211,641	0.19%	249,716	0.2%
Total responses	20,636,702	99.93%	109,989,655	100%	127,333,305	99.72%
Total population	20,651,140	100%	109,989,655	100%	127,688,922	100%

=== Tehsil wise Hindu population (2023) ===
Tehsils where Hindus form greater than 0.2% of the population are shown below. These tehsils constitute about 90% of the Hindus living in Punjab province.

District	Tehsil	Hindu population	Hindu (%)
Bahawalpur	Ahmadpur East	7,421	0.57
Bahawalpur	Bahawalpur Saddar	1,984	0.30
Bahawalpur	Bahawalpur City	1,743	0.21
Bahawalpur	Fort Abbas	987	0.19
Bahawalpur	Yazman	37,221	5.42
Rahim Yar Khan	Khanpur	26,237	2.24
Rahim Yar Khan	Liaquatpur	17,260	1.40
Rahim Yar Khan	Rahim Yar Khan	85,134	4.79
Rahim Yar Khan	Sadiqabad	47,785	3.46
Nankana Sahib	Sangla Hill	584	0.22

== Community life ==
Hindus in Punjab is mainly concentrated in the Bahawalpur Division. According to a study, the majority (86.5%) of the scheduled caste Hindus in Bahawalpur Division have experienced discrimination. The study found that majority (i.e. 91.5%) of the respondents in Rahimyar Khan districts believed that political parties are not giving importance to them. In Central Punjab, the population of Hindus are very low, so many of the Hindus have married Sikhs and vice versa. Intermarriages between the Hindus and Sikh community are very common there. The Forced conversion of Hindu girls are a problem faced by the Hindu community. According to a report by Minority Rights Commission, the number of forced conversions and forced marriages increasing in Bahawalpur Division, particularly the Rahim Yar Khan District and adjacent areas.

Hindu marriages in Punjab are registered under the Hindu marriage act of 2017.

Goga pir mela and Rama pir mela are major festivals in the Bahawalpur region. There have also been incidents of temple desecration like the 2021 Bhong temple attack.

== Politics ==
Punjab Assembly has eight reserved seats for non-Muslims and most of them are Christians. In 1997, the Seth Bharta Ram became the first Hindu to be elected to the minority reserved seat in Punjab Provincial assembly. It was only after 16 years, another Hindu member Kanji Ram was elected to the provincial assembly. Currently there are no Hindu member in the 17th Punjab provincial assembly.

Hindus form a significant electoral role in the assembly seats of Rahim Yar Khan District.

== Temples ==
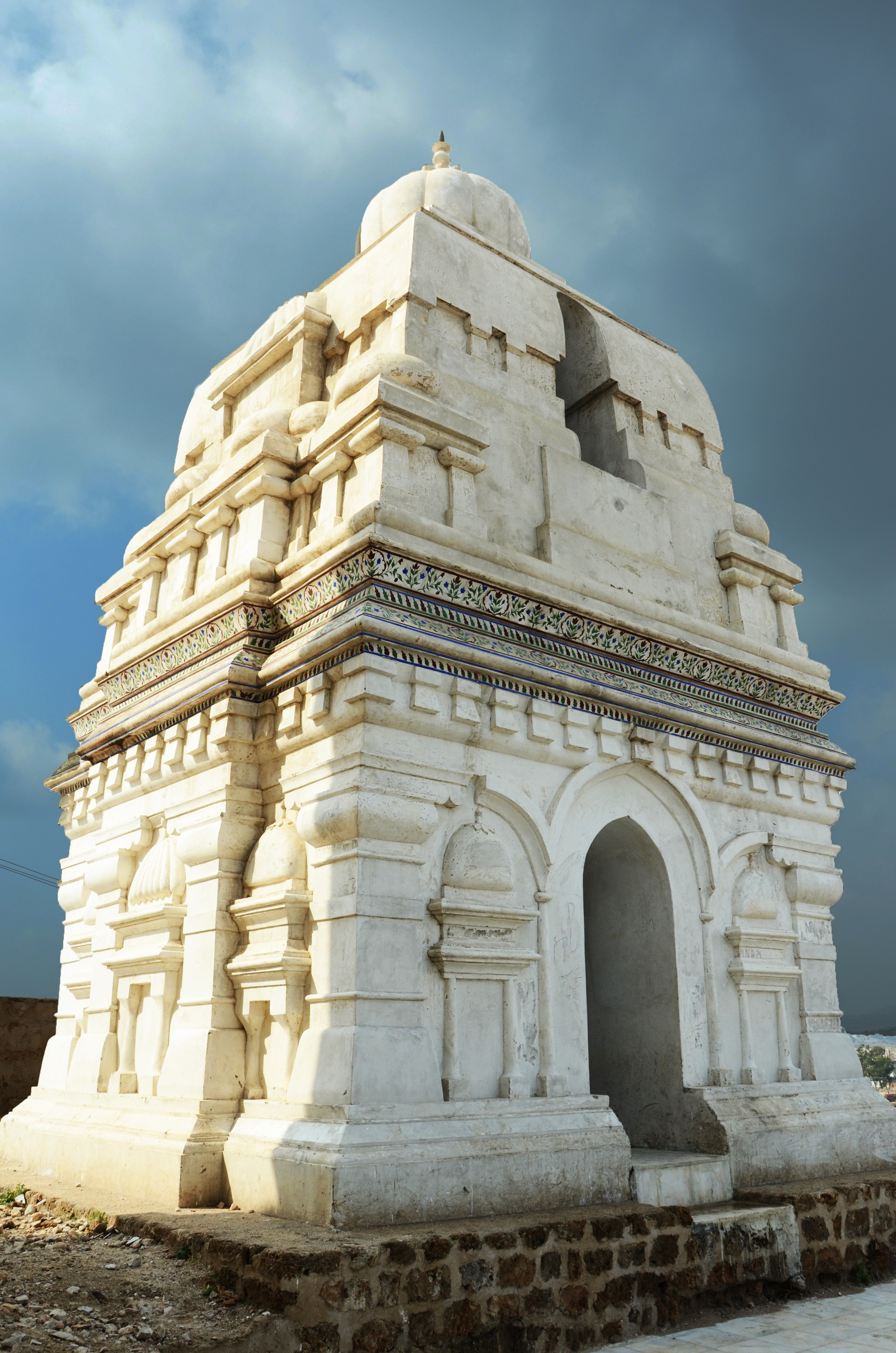
Hindu temple in Punjab Province.

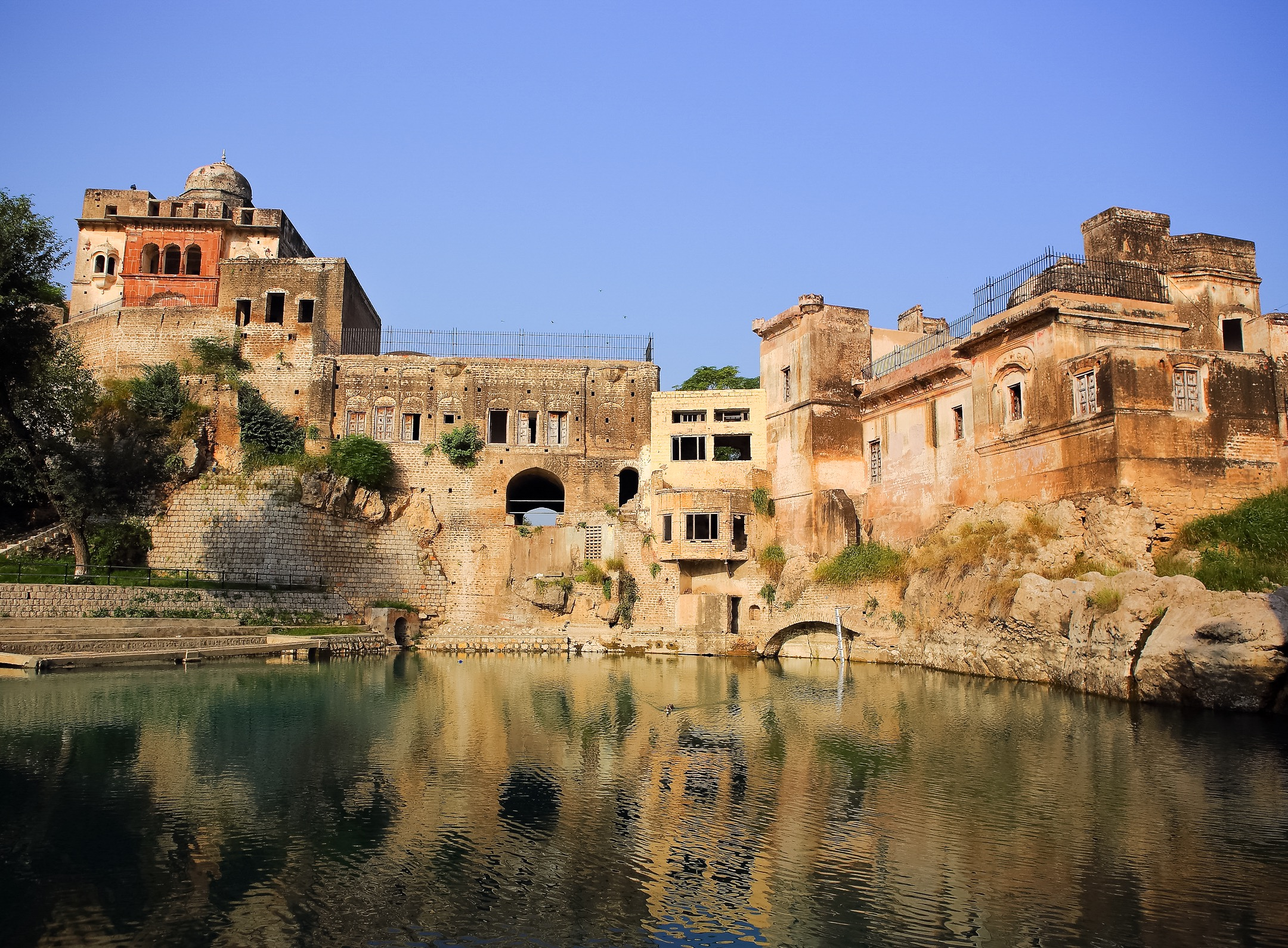
Katas Raj Temples in Punjab.

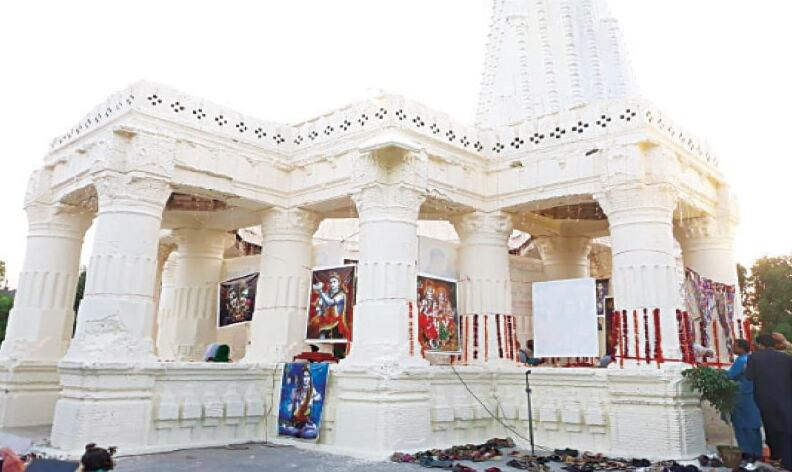
Shivala Teja Singh temple in Sialkot.

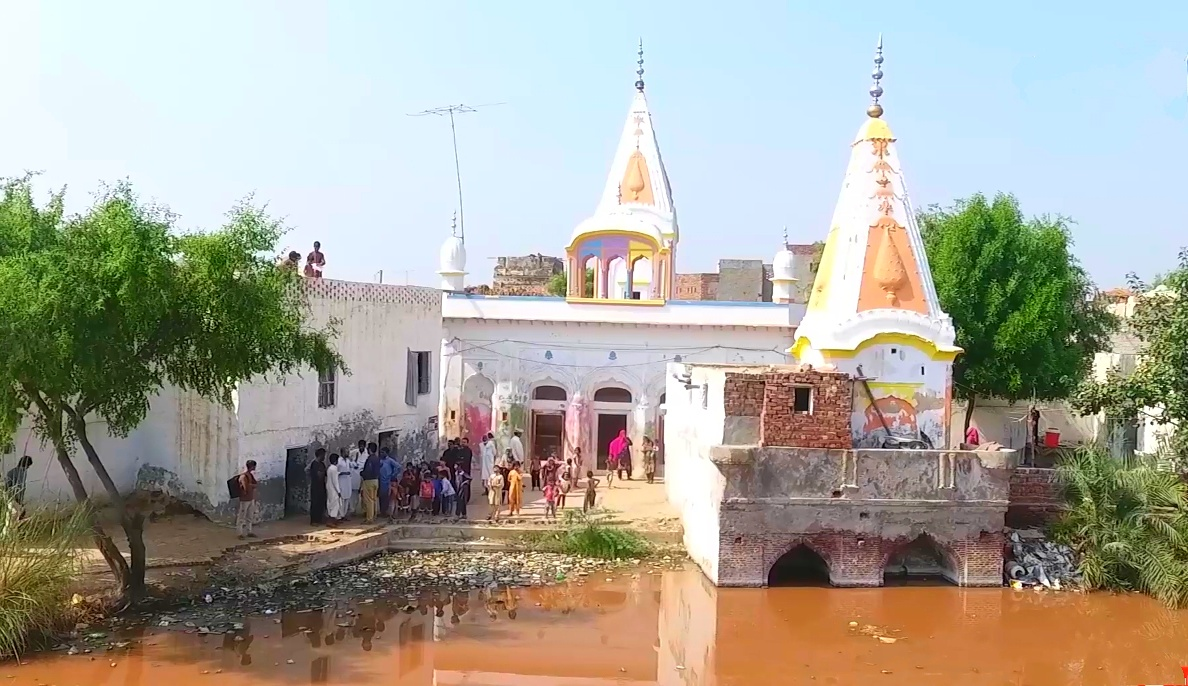
Baba Ram Thaman Shrine, a multi-religious shrine.

There are many temples in the Punjab and mainly of them served as a worship place for multi-religious community. The notable of them includes:

- Baba Ram Thaman Shrine
- Katas Raj Temples
- Krishna Temple, Rawalpindi
- Krishna Temple, Sadiqabad
- Multan Sun Temple
- Prahladpuri Temple, Multan
- Shivala Teja Singh temple
- Tilla Jogian
- Valmiki Mandir
- Kala Dhari Mandir
- Kalyan Das Temple

== See also ==
- Hinduism in Balochistan
- Hinduism in Islamabad Capital Territory
- Hinduism in Khyber Pakhtunkhwa
- Hinduism in Sindh
- Punjabi Hindus
