= PP-252 Bahawalpur-VIII =

Constituency of the Punjabi Provincial Legislature, Pakistan

- Constituency for the Provincial Assembly of Punjab
- Region: Bahawalpur Saddar Tehsil (partly) including Samasata town of Bahawalpur District

Current constituency
- Created from: PP-270 Bahawalpur-IV (2002-2018); PP-252 Bahawalpur-VIII (2018-)

PP-252 Bahawalpur-VIII (پی پی-252، بہاولپور-8) is a Constituency of Provincial Assembly of Punjab.

== General elections 2024 ==
Provincial election 2024: PP-252 Bahawalpur-VIII
| Party | Candidate | Votes | % | ±% |
|---|---|---|---|---|
| PML(N) | Mian Muhammad Shoaib Owaisi | 41,298 | 35.15 | |
| Independent | Shafqat Shaheen (Note: Filed nomination papers as PTI candidate but ECP allowed him to run as an Independent) | 26,562 | 22.61 | |
| Independent | Mahmood Majeed | 26,516 | 22.57 | |
| PPP | Shah Rukh Malik | 11,245 | 9.57 | |
| TLP | Syed Muhammad Mahboob | 7,020 | 5.98 | |
| Others | Others (eleven candidates) | 4,836 | 4.12 | |
| Turnout | | 120,850 | 52.63 | |
| Total valid votes | | 117,477 | 97.21 | |
| Rejected ballots | | 3,373 | 2.79 | |
| Majority | | 14,736 | 12.54 | |
| Registered electors | | 229,628 | | |
| hold | | | | |

== General elections 2018 ==
Provincial election 2018: PP-252 Bahawalpur-VIII
| Party | Candidate | Votes | % | ±% |
|---|---|---|---|---|
| PML(N) | Mian Muhammad Shoaib Owaisi | 45,467 | 42.18 | |
| PTI | Malik Ahmed Usman Nawaz | 26,406 | 24.50 | |
| PPP | Shahrukh Malik | 24,963 | 23.16 | |
| TLP | Muhammad Waqas Anwar | 7,771 | 7.21 | |
| AAT | Munir Ahmed | 1,895 | 1.76 | |
| Others | Others (five candidates) | 1,290 | 1.20 | |
| Turnout | | 111,446 | 56.25 | |
| Total valid votes | | 107,792 | 96.72 | |
| Rejected ballots | | 3,654 | 3.28 | |
| Majority | | 19,061 | 17.68 | |
| Registered electors | | 198,133 | | |

== General elections 2013 ==
Provincial election 2013: PP-270 Bahawalpur-IV
| Party | Candidate | Votes | % | ±% |
|---|---|---|---|---|
| PML(N) | Mian Muhammad Shoaib Awaisi | 52,848 | 57.67 | |
| PPP | Shah Ruk Malik | 23,508 | 25.65 | |
| Independent | Syed Ghulam Murtaza Shah | 11,611 | 12.67 | |
| Independent | Mian Zubair Mahmood Channar | 1,009 | 1.10 | |
| Others | Others (ten candidates) | 2,662 | 2.90 | |
| Turnout | | 93,885 | 60.19 | |
| Total valid votes | | 91,638 | 97.61 | |
| Rejected ballots | | 2,247 | 2.39 | |
| Majority | | 29,340 | 32.02 | |
| Registered electors | | 155,982 | | |

== General elections 2008 ==
| Contesting candidates | Party affiliation | Votes polled |

== See also ==
- PP-251 Bahawalpur-VII
- PP-253 Bahawalpur-IX
