= Chak 7P =

Coordinates: 28.5891556°N 70.69249°E

Chak No. 7/P, (Punjabi: چک نمبر 7) is a large village in the Khanpur tehsil, of Rahim Yar Khan District, in the Punjab province of Pakistan. It is located near Cholistan and the Aab-e-Hayat Canal. Cholistan Cadet College is near Chak No. 7/P. Locals belong to the Arain tribe and speak the Punjabi language. Exports include crops like sugarcane and wheat.

Chak 7/P is a center for sugarcane and cotton agriculture. It is one of the largest villages of the Rahim Yar Khan District, in terms of its area. The famous Cholistan Desert is located near Chak 7/P.

== Education ==
The people of Chak 7/P are well educated. There are two government schools, one health center, one veterinary hospital, and many private institutes. All the institutes show the standard of living and strategic planning by the leadership of Chak 7/P.

== History ==
The Punjab region became predominantly Muslim due to missionary Sufi saints whose dargahs dot the landscape of Punjab and Sindh region. After 712, Muhammad bin Qasim came to Sindh and this region become mostly Muslim. People of Chak 7/P are originally mostly from central Punjab Faisalabad, Amritsar, Jalandhar, Gurdaspur and Hoshiarpur.

== Agriculture ==
Agriculture is the main livelihood of Chak 7/P's residents. The major crops grown in the region are cotton, sugarcane, wheat, rice, fruits, and vegetables. Vegetables, especially carrots, are very famous in the winter season and are 7/p. Although 7/p was originally a major cotton-growing area, it has now shifted towards being a major sugarcane growing region. The average yield of the sugarcane crop is 1448.15 Mnds/Acre (2018–24), which is greater than the average yield of the world and Pakistan. Vegetables are grown widely in scattered areas, and the number of greenhouses is increasing every year.

== Notable people ==
Below is a list of people who are known for their association with Chak 7/P. It does not necessarily mean that they were born in the city or were even nationals of the country.

- Muhammad Arshad Javed (Former member of Punjab Assembly)
- Muhammad Ejaz Shafi (Member of Punjab Assembly)
- Dr Muhammad Zia (Lambardar)
- Muhammad Usman Ghani
