= PP-251 Bahawalpur-VII =

Constituency of the Punjabi Provincial Legislature, Pakistan

- Constituency for the Provincial Assembly of Punjab
- Region: Ahmedpur Sharqia Tehsil (partly) and Bahawalpur Saddar Tehsil (partly) of Bahawalpur District

Current constituency
- Created from: PP-269 Bahawalpur-III (2002-2018); PP-251 Bahawalpur-VII (2018-)

PP-251 Bahawalpur-VII (پی پی-251، بہاولپور-7) is a Constituency of Provincial Assembly of Punjab.

== General elections 2024 ==
Provincial election 2024: PP-251 Bahawalpur-VII
Party	Candidate	Votes	%	±%
PML(N)	Malik Khalid Mehmood Babar	43,557	37.33	
Independent	Sahabzada M Usman Khan Abbasi	29,435	25.22	
PPP	Syed Naseem Abbas Bukhari	19,815	16.98	
JUI (F)	Qari Muhammad Hammad Ullah	7,430	6.37	
Independent	Raees Abdul Qayyum (Note: Filed nomination papers as PTI candidate but ECP allowed him to run as an Independent)	5,754	4.93	
TLP	Muhammad Abbas	5,529	4.74	
Others	Others (twelve candidates)	5,177	4.43	
Turnout		121,283	51.78	
Total valid votes		116,697	96.22	
Rejected ballots		4,586	3.78	
Majority		14,122	12.11	
Registered electors		234,250		
hold				

== General elections 2018 ==
Provincial election 2018: PP-251 Bahawalpur-VII
Party	Candidate	Votes	%	±%
PML(N)	Malik Khalid Mehmood Babar	43,058	42.06	
PTI	Sardar Malik Jahan Zaib Waaran	21,806	21.30	
PPP	Syed Naseem Abbas Bukhari	20,717	20.24	
Independent	Sahibzada Shahzain Abbasi	12,245	11.96	
TLP	Muhammad Ijaz	4,386	4.28	
Independent	Rafat Ur Rehman Rahmani	159	0.16	
Turnout		107,003	55.79	
Total valid votes		102,371	95.67	
Rejected ballots		4,632	4.33	
Majority		21,252	20.76	
Registered electors		191,804		

== General elections 2013 ==
Provincial election 2013: PP-69 Bahawalpur-III
Party	Candidate	Votes	%	±%
PML(N)	Sardar Khalid Mahmood Waaran	37,047	46.75	
PPP	Sardar Kamran Mahmood Zafar	20,237	25.54	
MDM	Rao Muhamamd Javed Iqbal	15,699	19.81	
Independent	Daahir Malik Muhamamd Farooq Ghahlo	4,736	5.98	
Others	Others (six candidates)	1,531	1.93	
Turnout		82,661	57.77	
Total valid votes		79,250	95.87	
Rejected ballots		3,411	4.13	
Majority		16,810	21.21	
Registered electors		143,075		

== General elections 2008 ==
Contesting candidates	Party affiliation	Votes polled

== See also ==
- PP-250 Bahawalpur-VI
- PP-252 Bahawalpur-VIII
