= Makhdoom Syed Iftikhar Hassan Gillani =

Pakistani politician

Member of the Provincial Assembly of the Punjab
- In office 15 August 2018 – 14 January 2023
- Constituency: PP-254 (Bahawalpur-X)
- In office 29 May 2013 – 31 May 2018
- Constituency: PP-267 Bahawalpur-I

Personal details
- Born: 23 December 1958 (age 67) Bahawalpur, Punjab, Pakistan
- Party: IPP (2023-present)
- Other political affiliations: PTI (2018-2023); BNAP (2013-2018)

Makhdoom Syed Iftikhar Hassan Gillani (Urdu: مخدوم سید افتخار الحسن گیلانی) is a Pakistani politician who was a Member of the Provincial Assembly of the Punjab, from May 2013 to May 2018 and from August 2018 to January 2023.

== Early life and education ==
He was born on 23 December 1958 in Bahawalpur.

He graduated from The Islamia University of Bahawalpur in 1979.

== Political career ==
He was elected to the Provincial Assembly of the Punjab as a candidate of the Bahawalpur National Awami Party from PP-267 (Bahawalpur-I) in the 2013 Punjab provincial election.

He was re-elected to Provincial Assembly of the Punjab as a candidate of the Pakistan Tehreek-e-Insaf (PTI) from PP-254 (Bahawalpur-X) in the 2018 Punjab provincial election.

He ran for a seat in the Provincial Assembly from PP-250 Bahawalpur-VI as a candidate of the IPP in the 2024 Punjab provincial election.
