= PP-257 Rahim Yar Khan-III =

Constituency of the Punjabi Provincial Legislature, Pakistan

- Constituency for the Provincial Assembly of Punjab
- Region: Liaquatpur Tehsil (partly) including Liaquatpur town and Cholistan Desert area of Rahim Yar Khan District

Current constituency
- Created from: PP-287 Rahimyar Khan-III (2002-2018); PP-257 Rahim Yar Khan-III (2018-)

PP-257 Rahim Yar Khan-III (پی پی-257، رحیم یار خان-3) is a Constituency of Provincial Assembly of Punjab.

== General elections 2024 ==
Provincial election 2024: PP-257 Rahim Yar Khan-III
Party	Candidate	Votes	%	±%
PML(N)	Mehmood Ahmed	40,230	36.11	
PPP	Muhammad Islam Aslam	27,864	25.01	
Independent	Gul Jahazaib (Note: Filed nomination papers as PTI candidate but ECP allowed him to run as an Independent)	26,974	24.21	
Independent	Zohaib lqbal	4,586	4.12	
TLP	Ahmad Mahmood	3,348	3.01	
Others	Others (twenty two candidates)	8,405	7.54	
Turnout		115,514	53.65	
Total valid votes		111,407	96.44	
Rejected ballots		4,107	3.56	
Majority		12,366	11.10	
Registered electors		215,327		
hold				

== General elections 2018 ==
Provincial election 2018: PP-257 Rahim Yar Khan-III
Party	Candidate	Votes	%	±%
PTI	Ch. Masood Ahmad	36,914	39.47	
PML(N)	Muhammad Islam Aslam	26,962	28.83	
PPP	Gul Jahan Zaib	24,380	26.07	
Independent	Abdul Rehman	1,795	1.92	
Others	Others (eight candidates)	3,483	3.71	
Turnout		96,392	58.79	
Total valid votes		93,534	97.04	
Rejected ballots		2,858	2.96	
Majority		9,952	10.64	
Registered electors		163,949		

== General elections 2013 ==
Provincial election 2013: PP-287 Rahim Yar Khan-III
Party	Candidate	Votes	%	±%
PML(N)	Mian Muhammad Islam Aslam	30,258	37.62	
PPP	Col.(R) Naveed Sajid	19,334	24.04	
Independent	Choudary Masood Ahmad	17,897	22.25	
PML(F)	Muhammad Jamal Murad	6,887	8.56	
PTI	Dr. Naveed Akbar Choudary	4,547	5.65	
Others	Others (fifteen candidates)	1,515	1.88	
Turnout		83,848	60.45	
Total valid votes		80,438	95.93	
Rejected ballots		3,410	4.07	
Majority		10,924	13.58	
Registered electors		138,704		

== General elections 2008 ==
Contesting candidates	Party affiliation	Votes polled

== See also ==
- PP-256 Rahim Yar Khan-II
- PP-258 Rahim Yar Khan-IV
