= Muhammad Arshad Javed =

Pakistani politician

Member of the Provincial Assembly of the Punjab
- In office 15 August 2018 – 14 January 2023
- Constituency: PP-260 Rahim Yar Khan-VI

Personal details
- Party: PMLN

Muhammad Arshad Javed is a Pakistani Punjabi politician who had been a member of the Provincial Assembly of the Punjab from August 2018 till January 2023.

== Personal life ==
He was born in Chak 7P to Arain family. He has great political and social influence due to his participation in local issues.

== Political career ==
He was elected to the Provincial Assembly of the Punjab as a candidate of Pakistan Muslim League (N) from Constituency PP-260 (Rahim Yar Khan-VI) in the 2018 Pakistani general election.
