= PP-255 Rahim Yar Khan-I =

Constituency of the Punjabi Provincial Legislature, Pakistan

- Constituency for the Provincial Assembly of Punjab
- Region: Liaquatpur Tehsil (partly) including Allahabad town of Rahim Yar Khan District

Current constituency
- Created from: PP-285 Rahimyar Khan-I (2002-2018); PP-255 Rahim Yar Khan-I (2018-)

PP-255 Rahim Yar Khan-I (پی پی-255، رحیم یار خان-1) is a Constituency of Provincial Assembly of Punjab.

== General elections 2024 ==
Provincial election 2024: PP-255 Rahim Yar Khan-I
Party	Candidate	Votes	%	±%
PPP	Ghazanfar Ali Khan	42,996	37.94	
PML(N)	Makhdoom Syed Muhammad Masood Alam	37,613	33.19	
Independent	Muhammad lqbal Rais (Note: Filed nomination papers as PTI candidate but ECP allowed him to run as an Independent)	22,940	20.25	
TLP	Muhammad Imran Saeedi	2,308	2.04	
Others	Others (ten candidates)	7,456	6.58	
Turnout		117,245	51.59	
Total valid votes		113,313	96.65	
Rejected ballots		3,932	3.35	
Majority		5,383	4.75	
Registered electors		227,268		
hold				

== General elections 2018 ==
Provincial election 2018: PP-255 Rahim Yar Khan-I
Party	Candidate	Votes	%	±%
PPP	Ghazanfar Ali Khan	40,314	40.22	
PTI	Makhdoom Syed Muhammad Masood Alam	39,077	38.98	
Independent	Malik Azeem Bakhsh Naich	10,773	10.75	
Independent	Qazi Ahmad Saeed	3,778	3.77	
Independent	Malik Mushtaq Ahmed	1,913	1.91	
Independent	Syed Muhammad Mateen Mohsin	1,897	1.89	
Independent	Muhammad Iqbal Rais	1,692	1.69	
Others	Others (two candidates)	794	0.80	
Turnout		103,340	57.72	
Total valid votes		100,238	97.00	
Rejected ballots		3,102	3.00	
Majority		1,237	1.24	
Registered electors		179,046		

== General elections 2013 ==
Provincial election 2013: PP-285 Rahim Yar Khan-I
Party	Candidate	Votes	%	±%
PML(N)	Makdum Syed Muhammad Masood Alam	32,648	43.31	
PPP	Ghazanfar Ali Khan	25,948	34.42	
Independent	Muhammad Iqbal Rais	7,653	10.15	
Independent	Rais Muhammad Ahmad	3,258	4.32	
Independent	Malik Junaid Aslam	2,505	3.32	
JI	Jam Enayat Ghafar	1,839	2.44	
Others	Others (eight candidates)	1,532	2.03	
Turnout		78,199	58.23	
Total valid votes		75,383	96.40	
Rejected ballots		2,816	3.60	
Majority		6,700	8.89	
Registered electors		134,291		

== General elections 2008 ==
Contesting candidates	Party affiliation	Votes polled

== See also ==
- PP-254 Bahawalpur-X
- PP-256 Rahim Yar Khan-II
