= PP-250 Bahawalpur-VI =

Constituency of the Punjabi Provincial Legislature, Pakistan

- Constituency for the Provincial Assembly of Punjab
- Region: Ahmedpur Sharqia Tehsil including Uch city of Bahawalpur District

Current constituency
- Created from: PP-267 Bahawalpur-I (2002-2018); PP-254 Bahawalpur-X (2018-2023)

PP-250 Bahawalpur-VI (پی پی-250، بہاولپور-6) is a Constituency of Provincial Assembly of Punjab.

== General elections 2024 ==
Provincial election 2024: PP-250 Bahawalpur-VI
Party	Candidate	Votes	%	±%
PPP	Syed Ali Amir Shah	26,272	25.36	
IPP	Makhdoom Syed Iftikhar Hassan Gillani	21,258	20.52	
Independent	Muhammad Naveed Khalid	17,245	16.65	
Independent	Muhammad Afzal Chaudhry (Note: Filed nomination papers as PTI candidate but ECP allowed him to run as an Independent)	11,376	10.98	
Independent	Malik Ahmad Yar	9,676	9.34	
JUI (F)	Mahar Ghulam Rabani	5,448	5.26	
TLP	Syed Ishrat Jehanian Bukhari	4,808	4.64	
Independent	Sheikh Farooq Hameed	3,180	3.07	
Others	Others (six candidates)	4,321	4.18	
Turnout		107,985	51.16	
Total valid votes		103,584	95.92	
Rejected ballots		4,401	4.08	
Majority		5,014	4.84	
Registered electors		211,093		
hold				

== General elections 2018 ==
Provincial election 2018: PP-254 Bahawalpur-X
Party	Candidate	Votes	%	±%
PTI	Syed Iftakhar Hassan	36,665	37.52	
PPP	Syed Aamir Ali Shah	27,408	28.04	
Independent	Arif Aziz Shaikh	24,559	25.13	
TLP	Syed Ishrat Jehanian Bukhari	5,094	5.21	
Independent	Parveen Atta	1,912	1.96	
PML(N)	Zahid Mehmood	1,732	1.77	
Others	Others (two candidates)	362	0.37	
Turnout		101,024	53.75	
Total valid votes		97,732	96.74	
Rejected ballots		3,292	3.26	
Majority		9,257	9.48	
Registered electors		187,957		

== General elections 2013 ==
Provincial election 2013: PP-267 Bahawalpur-I
Party	Candidate	Votes	%	±%
Bahawalpur National Awami Party	Makhdoom Syed Iftakhar Hassan Gillani	31,926	37.19	
PML(N)	Hassan Askari Shaikh	23,655	27.55	
PPP	Malik Muhammad Jamshaid	13,247	15.43	
JUI (F)	Malik Qadir Bukhsh	8,895	10.36	
JI	Muhammad Parwaiz Akhtar	4,222	4.92	
PTI	Malik Umair Hameed	1,443	1.68	
Independent	Makhdoomzada Syed Umer Raza	1,074	1.25	
Others	Others (five candidaes)	1,392	1.62	
Turnout		89,656	58.74	
Total valid votes		85,854	95.76	
Rejected ballots		3,802	4.24	
Majority		8,271	9.64	
Registered electors		152,630		

== General elections 2008 ==
Contesting candidates	Party affiliation	Votes polled

== See also ==
- PP-249 Bahawalpur-V
- PP-251 Bahawalpur-VII
