= Muhammad Afzal Chaudhry =

Pakistani politician

Member of the Provincial Assembly of the Punjab
- In office 15 August 2018 – 14 January 2023
- Constituency: PP-250 Bahawalpur-VI

Personal details
- Party: PART (2026-present)
- Other political affiliations: PTI (2023-2026); PML(Q) (2018-2023)

Muhammad Afzal Chaudhry is a Pakistani politician who had been a member of the Provincial Assembly of the Punjab from August 2018 till January 2023.

== Political career ==
He was elected to the Provincial Assembly of the Punjab as a candidate of the Pakistan Muslim League (Q) (PML(Q)) from PP-250 (Bahawalpur-VI) in the 2018 Punjab provincial election.

On 21 February 2023, after the dissolution of the Provincial Assembly, he, along with former Chief Minister Chaudhry Pervaiz Elahi and eight other former PML(Q) MPAs, joined the Pakistan Tehreek-e-Insaf (PTI).

He ran for a seat in the Provincial Assembly from PP-248 Bahawalpur-IV as a candidate of the PTI in the 2023 Punjab provincial election.
