= Muhammad Sohail Khan Zahid =

Pakistani politician

Muhammad Sohail Khan Zahid is a Pakistani politician who has been a Member of the Provincial Assembly of the Punjab since 2024. He received 42000 Votes in 2024 Pakistani General Elections. His younger brother Muhammad Asif Zahid Khan has also served as a President of Bahawalnagar Bar Association.

== Political career ==
He was elected to the Provincial Assembly of the Punjab as a candidate of the Pakistan Muslim League (N) (PML-N) from constituency PP-240 Bahawalnagar-IV in the 2024 Pakistani general election.
