= Mian Shafi Muhammad =

Pakistani politician

Member of the Provincial Assembly of the Punjab
- In office 15 August 2018 – 14 January 2023
- Constituency: PP-258 Rahim Yar Khan-IV

Personal details
- Party: PTI (2018–present)

Mian Shafi Muhammad is a Pakistani politician who had been a member of the Provincial Assembly of the Punjab from August 2018 till January 2023.

== Political career ==
He was elected to the Provincial Assembly of the Punjab as a candidate of the Pakistan Tehreek-e-Insaf (PTI) from PP-258 (Rahim Yar Khan-IV) in the 2018 Punjab provincial election.

He ran for a seat in the Provincial Assembly from PP-259 Rahim Yar Khan-V as a candidate of the PTI in the 2024 Punjab provincial election.
