= PP-261 Rahim Yar Khan-VII =

Constituency of the Punjabi Provincial Legislature, Pakistan

- Constituency for the Provincial Assembly of Punjab
- Region: R.Y.K Tehsil (partly) including Kot Samaba town of Rahim Yar Khan District

Current constituency
- Created from: PP-291 Rahimyar Khan-VII (2002-2018); PP-261 Rahim Yar Khan-VII (2018-)

PP-261 Rahim Yar Khan-VII (پی پی-261، رحیم یار خان-7) is a Constituency of Provincial Assembly of Punjab.

== General elections 2024 ==
Provincial election 2024: PP-261 Rahim Yar Khan-VII
Party	Candidate	Votes	%	±%
Independent	Jam Aman Ullah (Note: Filed nomination papers as PTI candidate but ECP allowed him to run as an Independent)	42,434	36.28	
PPP	Makhdoom Muhammad Irtiza	23,638	20.21	
Independent	Makhdoom Afkar UI Hassan	20,568	17.58	
PML(N)	Makhdoom Moeen Uddin Ali	13,653	11.67	
TLP	Sultan Mehmood	7,298	6.24	
Independent	Makhdoom Hassan Raza Hashmi	4,618	3.95	
Others	Others (ten candidates)	4,758	4.07	
Turnout		120,768	50.50	
Total valid votes		116,967	96.85	
Rejected ballots		3,801	3.15	
Majority		18,796	16.07	
Registered electors		239,153		
hold				

== By Elections 2018 ==
By-elections held on October 14, 2018, Fawaz Ahmad won this seat on the PTI ticket.

== General elections 2018 ==
In the general elections held on July 25, 2018, Hashim Jawan Bakht won two seats (PP-259 and PP-261) on the PTI ticket. However, he vacated the PP-261 seat. Consequently, in the by-elections held on October 14, 2018, Fawaz Ahmad won this seat on the PTI ticket.

Provincial election 2018: PP-261 Rahim Yar Khan-VII
Party	Candidate	Votes	%	±%
PTI	Makhdum Hashim Jawan Bakht	38,051	36.83	
PPP	Makhdoom Muhammad Irtaza Hashmi	28,664	27.75	
Independent	Abdul Rauf	15,394	14.90	
PML(N)	Makhdoom Imad Ud Din Hashmi	12,501	12.10	
TLP	Iftikhar Hussain	4,125	3.99	
Independent	Muhammad Asad Ghaffar	1,175	1.14	
Others	Others (seven candidates)	3,400	3.29	
Turnout		106,786	57.68	
Total valid votes		103,310	96.75	
Rejected ballots		3,476	3.25	
Majority		9,387	9.08	
Registered electors		185,121		

== General elections 2013 ==
Provincial election 2013: PP-291 Rahim Yar Khan-VII
Party	Candidate	Votes	%	±%
Independent	Makhdoom Hashim Jawan Bukht	21,759	28.63	
PPP	Makhdoom Muhammad Irtaza Hashmi	20,036	26.36	
PML(N)	Makhdoom Adeel Ur Rahman Hashmi	12,294	16.18	
Independent	Syed Javed Muhsan Naqvi	10,956	14.42	
PTI	Maaz Makhdoom	7,461	9.82	
Others	Others (twelve candidates)	3,496	4.60	
Turnout		78,631	58.23	
Total valid votes		76,002	96.66	
Rejected ballots		2,629	3.34	
Majority		1,723	2.27	
Registered electors		135,025		

== General elections 2008 ==
Contesting candidates	Party affiliation	Votes polled

== See also ==
- PP-260 Rahim Yar Khan-VI
- PP-262 Rahim Yar Khan-VIII
