= Al-Shafiʽi (disambiguation) =

Al-Shafiʽi (Arabic: الشافعيّ) was a Muslim jurist and founder of the Shafiʽi school of fiqh (or Madh'hab) which is named after him.

Al-Shafiʽi may also refer to:

- Al-Ghazali (c.1058–1111), Islamic philosopher
- Al-Nawawi (1233–1277), Shafi'ite jurist and hadith scholar

== See also ==
- Hanbali (nisba) (disambiguation)
- Shafi (disambiguation)
