= PP-253 Bahawalpur-IX =

Constituency of the Punjabi Provincial Legislature, Pakistan

- Constituency for the Provincial Assembly of Punjab
- Region: Bahawalpur city eastern area in Bahawalpur District

Current constituency
- Created from: PP-272 Bahawalpur-VI (2002-2018); PP-245 Bahawalpur-I (2018-2023)

PP-253 Bahawalpur-IX (پی پی-253، بہاولپور-9) is a Constituency of Provincial Assembly of Punjab.

== General elections 2024 ==
Provincial election 2024: PP-253 Bahawalpur-IX
Party	Candidate	Votes	%	±%
PML(N)	Zaheer Iqbal	45,613	48.65	
Independent	Muhammad Asghar (Note: Filed nomination papers as PTI candidate but ECP allowed him to run as an Independent)	27,614	29.45	
JI	Nasrullah Khan Nasir	5,239	5.59	
TLP	Shahida Batool	4,016	4.28	
PPP	Malik Abdul Majeed	3,846	4.10	
Independent	Muhammad Bilal Balouch	2,227	2.38	
Others	Others (eleven candidates)	5,213	5.55	
Turnout		94,600	47.32	
Total valid votes		93,768	99.12	
Rejected ballots		832	0.88	
Majority		17,999	19.20	
Registered electors		199,913		
hold				

== General elections 2018 ==
Provincial election 2018: PP-245 Bahawalpur-I
Party	Candidate	Votes	%	±%
PML(N)	Zaheer Iqbal	47,200	50.74	
PTI	Muhammad Asgher	42,246	45.41	
PPP	Muhammad Asim Javid Abbasi	2,905	3.12	
Others	Others (three candidates)	679	0.74	
Turnout		94,857	54.57	
Total valid votes		93,030	98.07	
Rejected ballots		1,827	1.93	
Majority		4,954	5.33	
Registered electors		173,830		

== General elections 2013 ==
Provincial election 2013: PP-272 Bahawalpur-VI
Party	Candidate	Votes	%	±%
PML(N)	Malik Muhammad Iqbal Channar	40,409	44.16	
PTI	Muhammad Asghar	25,168	27.50	
Bahawalpur National Awami Party	Haji Muhammad Hanif	16,393	17.91	
PPP	Azra Mahmood Shaikh	4,663	5.10	
Independent	Syed Saleem Mumtaz Shah	1,246	1.36	
Independent	Malik Abdul Majeed Channar	1,178	1.29	
JUI (F)	Muhammad Sajjad Akram Ramai	1,087	1.19	
Others	Others (eleven candidates)	1,365	1.49	
Turnout		93,722	55.98	
Total valid votes		91,509	97.64	
Rejected ballots		2,213	2.36	
Majority		15,241	16.66	
Registered electors		167,433		

== General elections 2008 ==
Contesting candidates	Party affiliation	Votes polled

== See also ==
- PP-252 Bahawalpur-VIII
- PP-254 Bahawalpur-X
