= PP-256 Rahim Yar Khan-II =

Constituency of the Punjab Provincial Legislature, Pakistan

- Constituency for the Provincial Assembly of Punjab
- Region: Liaquatpur Tehsil (partly) including Khan Bela town and Khanpur Tehsil (partly) of Rahim Yar Khan District

Current constituency
- Created from: PP-286 Rahim Yar Khan-II (2002-2018); PP-256 Rahim Yar Khan-II (2018-)

PP-256 Rahim Yar Khan-II (پی پی-256، رحیم یار خان-2) is a Constituency of Rahim Yar Khan Provincial Assembly of Punjab.

== General elections 2024 ==
Provincial election 2024: PP-256 Rahim Yar Khan-II
Party	Candidate	Votes	%	±%
PPP	Qazi Ahmad Saeed	28,469	25.12	
Independent	Muhammad Amir Nawaz Khan	23,921	21.11	
Independent	Jan Muhammad Akhtar (Note: Filed nomination papers as PTI candidate but ECP allowed him to run as an Independent)	21,106	18.63	
PML(N)	Khawaja Ghulam Rasool Koreja	19,585	17.28	
Independent	Syed Mubeen Hussain Shah	11,724	10.35	
TLP	Muhammad Arif	2,598	2.29	
Others	Others (thirteen candidates)	5,919	5.22	
Turnout		117,752	47.25	
Total valid votes		113,322	96.24	
Rejected ballots		4,430	3.76	
Majority		4,548	4.01	
Registered electors		249,223		
hold				

== General elections 2018 ==
Provincial election 2018: PP-256 Rahim Yar Khan-II
Party	Candidate	Votes	%	±%
PTI	Muhammad Aamir Nawaz Khan	36,468	36.09	
PPP	Qazi Anmad Saeed	31,552	31.23	
Independent	Nazir Ahmad Khan Baloch	14,965	14.81	
Independent	Jam Muhammad Akbar	9,824	9.72	
Independent	Amir Saeed	3,754	3.72	
Independent	Faiz Ul Hassan Khan	2,144	2.12	
Others	Others (five candidates)	2,328	2.30	
Turnout		104,239	55.01	
Total valid votes		101,035	96.93	
Rejected ballots		3,204	3.07	
Majority		4,916	4.86	
Registered electors		189,499		

== General elections 2013 ==
Provincial election 2013: PP-286 Rahim Yar Khan-II
Party	Candidate	Votes	%	±%
PPP	Qazi Ahmad Saeed	32,246	41.42	
PML(N)	Muhammad Amir Nawaz Khan	22,898	29.41	
PTI	Nazeer Ahmad Khan Balooch	11,081	14.23	
Independent	Naila Parveen	6,478	8.32	
Independent	Faiz Ul Hassan	1,391	1.79	
JUI (F)	Abdul Raoof Rabbani	1,229	1.58	
Others	Others (seven candidates)	2,530	3.25	
Turnout		81,130	57.58	
Total valid votes		77,853	95.96	
Rejected ballots		3,277	4.04	
Majority		9,348	12.01	
Registered electors		140,892		

== General elections 2008 ==
Contesting candidates	Party affiliation	Votes polled

== See also ==
- PP-255 Rahim Yar Khan-I
- PP-257 Rahim Yar Khan-III
