= Muhammad Shafi (disambiguation) =

Muhammad Shafi may refer to:

- Muhammad Shafi (1897–1976), Pakistani Islamic Scholar
- Muhammad Shafi (athlete), Pakistani sprinter
- Mian Muhammad Shafi, British Indian Lawyer and politician
- Muhammad Shafiq, Pakistani sports administrator
- Muhammad Shafi Daudi, Indian Muslim scholar
- Muhammad Shafi Siddiqui, Justice of the Supreme Court of Pakistan
- Muhammad Shafiq Jamal, Malaysian footballer
- Muhammad Shafiqur Rahman, Bangladeshi politician
- Mohammad Shafi (politician), Indian politician
- Mohammad Shafi Bhat, Indian politician
