= PP-239 Bahawalnagar-III =

Constituency of the Punjabi Provincial Legislature, Pakistan

- Constituency for the Provincial Assembly of Punjab
- Region: Bahawalnagar Tehsil (partly) and Chistian Tehsil (partly) of Bahawalnagar District

Current constituency
- Created from: PP-280 Bahawanagar-IV (2002-2018); PP-239 Bahawalnagar-III (2018-)

PP-239 Bahawalnagar-III (پی پی-239، بہاولنگر-3) is a Constituency of Provincial Assembly of Punjab.

== General elections 2024 ==
Provincial election 2024: PP-239 Bahawalnagar-III
Party	Candidate	Votes	%	±%
Independent	Muhammad Atif Aurangzeb (Note: Filed nomination papers as PTI candidate but ECP allowed him to run as an Independent)	40,346	34.08	
PML(N)	Mian Mumtaz Ahmed	32,382	27.35	
TLP	Muhammad Mazhar Wattoo	15,999	13.51	
Independent	Asif Manzoor Mohal	14,619	12.35	
PPP	Iftikhar Ali	3,347	2.83	
JI	Muhammad Riaz	2,341	1.98	
Independent	Muhammad Jamil	2,308	1.95	
Others	Others (sixteen candidates)	7,053	5.95	
Turnout		122,230	54.84	
Total valid votes		118,395	96.86	
Rejected ballots		3,835	3.14	
Majority		7,964	6.73	
Registered electors		222,899		
hold				

== General elections 2018 ==
Provincial election 2018: PP-239 Bahawalnagar-III
Party	Candidate	Votes	%	±%
PML(N)	Rana Abdur Rauf	42,573	38.99	
PTI	Ehtesham UI Haq Laleka	25,813	23.64	
Independent	Muhamad Sohail Khan Zahid	20,891	19.13	
PHP	Syed Irfan Mohsin	7,221	6.61	
AAT	Muhammad Sohail	3,614	3.31	
MMA	Muhammad Saleem	2,422	2.22	
TLP	Muhammad Farooq	2,018	1.85	
Others	Others (eleven candidates)	4,643	4.25	
Turnout		112,340	56.53	
Total valid votes		109,195	97.20	
Rejected ballots		3,145	2.80	
Majority		16,760	15.35	
Registered electors		198,730		

== General elections 2013 ==
Provincial election 2013: PP-280 Bahawalnagar-IV
Party	Candidate	Votes	%	±%
PTI	Mian Mumtaz Ahmad Maharwi	17,558	20.36	
PML(N)	Sajjad Ahmad Jhatol	16,173	18.75	
PML(Q)	Choudhry Shahzad Jatt	12,554	14.56	
PML(Z)	Mian Ahmad Hassan Khan Lakhwaira	11,783	13.66	
PPP	Ahmad Riaz Sukhera	7,499	8.70	
Independent	Syed Zafar Ahmad Shah	4,520	5.24	
Independent	Peer Muhammad Ali Chishti	3,190	3.70	
Pakistan Kissan Ittehad	Sahibzada Mian Abdul Gayyur	2,134	2.47	
JUI (F)	Molana Abdul Khaliq Mohar	1,956	2.27	
TTP	Choudhry Iftikhar Ali Arain	1,447	1.68	
Bahawalpur National Awami Party	Zafar Iqbal	1,376	1.60	
Others	Others (twenty five candidates)	6,048	7.01	
Turnout		91,001	60.06	
Total valid votes		86,238	94.77	
Rejected ballots		4,763	5.23	
Majority		1,385	1.61	
Registered electors		151,523		

== General elections 2008 ==
Contesting candidates	Party affiliation	Votes polled

== See also ==
- PP-238 Bahawalnagar-II
- PP-240 Bahawalnagar-IV
