= PP-254 Bahawalpur-X =

Constituency of the Punjabi Provincial Legislature, Pakistan

- Constituency for the Provincial Assembly of Punjab
- Region: Bahawalpur city western area and Bahawalpur Cantonment area in Bahawalpur District

Current constituency
- Created from: PP-271 Bahawalpur-V (2002-2018); PP-246 Bahawalpur-II (2018-2023)

PP-254 Bahawalpur-X (پی پی-254، بہاولپور-10) is a Constituency of Provincial Assembly of Punjab.

== General elections 2024 ==
Provincial election 2024: PP-254 Bahawalpur-X
Party	Candidate	Votes	%	±%
PML(N)	Rana Muhammad Tariq	55,473	50.28	
Independent	Malik Ahmad Usman Channar (Note: Filed nomination papers as PTI candidate but ECP allowed him to run as an Independent)	23,578	21.53	
JI	Syed Zeeshan Akhter	11,260	10.21	
PPP	Syed Tahir UI Hussan	7,748	7.02	
TLP	Syed Muhammad Irfan Shah	4,251	3.85	
JUI (F)	Muhammad Safdar	2,564	2.32	
Others	Others (twenty six candidates)	5,278	4.79	
Turnout		112,388	45.31	
Total valid votes		110,332	98.17	
Rejected ballots		2,056	1.83	
Majority		31,715	28.75	
Registered electors		248,050		
hold				

== General elections 2018 ==
Provincial election 2018: PP-246 Bahawalpur-II
Party	Candidate	Votes	%	±%
PTI	Samiullah Chaudhary	46,260	50.03	
PML(N)	Rana Muhammad Tariq Khan	36,868	39.87	
TLP	Muhammad Yousif Akram Abbasi	3,600	3.89	
MMA	Shafqat Rehman	2,079	2.25	
PPP	Shakir Mirza	1,809	1.96	
Others	Others (six candidates)	1,854	2.00	
Turnout		93,782	50.21	
Total valid votes		92,470	98.60	
Rejected ballots		1,312	1.40	
Majority		9,392	10.16	
Registered electors		186,778		

== General elections 2013 ==
Provincial election 2013: PP-271 Bahawalpur-V
Party	Candidate	Votes	%	±%
JI	Syed Waseem Akhtar	29,978	37.94	
PTI	Mian Farzand Ali Goheer	21,093	26.70	
PPP(SB)	Syed Tatheer Ul Hassan	10,982	13.90	
Independent	Zulfiqar Ali	5,434	6.88	
PPP	Muhammad Safdar	4,257	5.39	
JUI (F)	Shafqat Rehman	2,272	2.88	
Independent	Muhammad Pervaiz	1,613	2.04	
Others	Others (twenty six candidates)	3,376	4.27	
Turnout		80,473	48.30	
Total valid votes		79,005	98.18	
Rejected ballots		1,468	1.82	
Majority		8,885	11.24	
Registered electors		166,603		

== General elections 2008 ==
Contesting Candidates	Party Affiliation	Votes Polled

== See also ==
- PP-253 Bahawalpur-IX
- PP-255 Rahim Yar Khan-I
