= PP-258 Rahim Yar Khan-IV =

Constituency of the Punjabi Provincial Legislature, Pakistan

- Constituency for the Provincial Assembly of Punjab
- Region: Khanpur Tehsil (partly) including Khanpur town of Rahim Yar Khan District

Current constituency
- Created from: PP-290 Rahimyar Khan-VI (2002-2018); PP-260 Rahim Yar Khan-VI (2018-2023)

PP-258 Rahim Yar Khan-IV (پی پی-258، رحیم یار خان-4) is a Constituency of Provincial Assembly of Punjab.

== General elections 2024 ==
Provincial election 2024: PP-258 Rahim Yar Khan-IV
Party	Candidate	Votes	%	±%
Independent	Muhammad Ejaz Shafi (Note: Filed nomination papers as PTI candidate but ECP allowed him to run as an Independent)	65,963	58.52	
PML(N)	Muhammad Arshad Javid	31,804	28.21	
PPP	Mian Shahzad Anwar	7,412	6.58	
TLP	Hassan Mahmood	3,123	2.77	
Others	Others (sixteen candidates)	4,332	3.92	
Turnout		114,745	47.29	
Total valid votes		112,724	98.24	
Rejected ballots		2,021	1.76	
Majority		34,159	30.31	
Registered electors		242,631		
hold				

== General elections 2018 ==
Provincial election 2018: PP-260 Rahim Yar Khan-VI
Party	Candidate	Votes	%	±%
PML(N)	Muhammad Arshad Javed	35,811	33.39	
PTI	Abdul Majid	27,695	25.83	
Independent	Chaudhry Muhammad Ejaz Shafi	25,485	23.77	
PPP	Muhammad Sohail Wahid	13,895	12.96	
Independent	Hafiz Muhammad Tahir Zeeshan	1,281	1.20	
Independent	Mian Muhammad Asgher	1,094	1.02	
Others	Others (seven candidates)	1,978	1.84	
Turnout		109,352	53.32	
Total valid votes		107,239	98.07	
Rejected ballots		2,113	1.93	
Majority		8,116	7.56	
Registered electors		205,077		

== General elections 2013 ==
Provincial election 2013: PP-290 Rahim Yar Khan-VI
Party	Candidate	Votes	%	±%
PML(N)	Muhammad Ejaz Shafi	42,992	53.70	
PPP	Muhammad Arshad Javed	19,472	24.32	
PTI	Choudary Sabir Ali Advocate	11,592	14.48	
PST	Mufti Muhammad Tahir Zeeshan Qadari	2,783	3.48	
Others	Others (seventeen candidates)	3,220	4.02	
Turnout		81,901	55.90	
Total valid votes		80,059	97.75	
Rejected ballots		1,842	2.25	
Majority		23,520	29.38	
Registered electors		146,512		

== General elections 2008 ==
Contesting candidates	Party affiliation	Votes polled

== See also ==
- PP-257 Rahim Yar Khan-III
- PP-259 Rahim Yar Khan-V
