= PP-240 Bahawalnagar-IV =

Constituency of the Punjabi Provincial Legislature, Pakistan

- Constituency for the Provincial Assembly of Punjab
- Region: Bahawalnagar Tehsil (partly) including Bahawalnagar city of Bahawalnagar District

Current constituency
- Created from: PP-279 Bahawalnagar-III (2002-2018); PP-240 Bahawalnagar-IV (2018-)

PP-240 Bahawalnagar-IV (پی پی-240، بہاولنگر-4) is a Constituency of Provincial Assembly of Punjab.

== General elections 2024 ==
Provincial election 2024: PP-240 Bahawalnagar-IV
Party	Candidate	Votes	%	±%
Independent	Muhammad Sohail Khan Zahid	42,117	34.33	
PML(N)	Rana Abdul Rauf	32,525	26.51	
Independent	Muhammad Awais Asghar (Note: Filed nomination papers as PTI candidate but ECP allowed him to run as an Independent)	29,218	23.82	
TLP	Muhammad Akhtar	8,469	6.90	
JI	Syed Muhammad Masud Iqbal	2,952	2.41	
PPP	Hafiz Abrar Ur Rahman	2,333	1.90	
Others	Others (twenty candidates)	5,068	4.13	
Turnout		126,778	53.48	
Total valid votes		122,682	96.77	
Rejected ballots		4,096	3.23	
Majority		9,592	7.82	
Registered electors		237,069		
hold				

== General elections 2018 ==
Provincial election 2018: PP-240 Bahawalnagar-IV
Party	Candidate	Votes	%	±%
Independent	Muhammad Jameel	23,681	23.74	
PTI	Mian Mumtaz Ahmed	17,841	17.89	
Independent	Ahmed Hassan Lakhwera	13,790	13.83	
Independent	Asif Manzoor Mohal	12,617	12.65	
Independent	Fazal Mehmood	7,375	7.39	
Independent	Ahmed Rasheed	4,956	4.97	
Independent	Ahmed Riaz	4,529	4.54	
PHP	Sahibzada Nadeem Hassan	4,505	4.52	
TLP	Iftikar Ali	3,973	3.98	
Independent	Muhammad Abbas	3,455	3.46	
PML(Z)	Sardar Ahmad Khan Akuka	1,019	1.02	
Others	Others (twenty candidates)	2,001	2.02	
Turnout		103,768	57.43	
Total valid votes		99,742	96.12	
Rejected ballots		4,026	3.88	
Majority		5,840	5.85	
Registered electors		180,687		

== General elections 2013 ==
Provincial election 2013: PP-279 Bahawalnagar-III
Party	Candidate	Votes	%	±%
PML(N)	Rana Abdul Rauf	44,516	48.98	
PTI	Syed Ahmad Nadeem	20,434	22.48	
Independent	Saith Khalid Iqbal	9,966	10.97	
PPP	Kanwar Hashmat Ullah Khan	7,390	8.13	
TTP	Hafiz Muhammad Yasin	2,925	3.22	
JI	Professor Hameed Ullah Khan	1,823	2.01	
JUI (F)	Mian Abdul Latif Mohal	1,612	1.77	
Others	Others (twenty three candidates)	2,218	2.44	
Turnout		94,407	59.82	
Total valid votes		90,884	96.27	
Rejected ballots		3,523	3.73	
Majority		24,082	26.50	
Registered electors		157,820		

== General elections 2008 ==
Contesting candidates	Party affiliation	Votes polled

== See also ==
- PP-239 Bahawalnagar-III
- PP-241 Bahawalnagar-V
