= PP-238 Bahawalnagar-II =

Constituency of the Punjabi Provincial Legislature, Pakistan

- Constituency for the Provincial Assembly of Punjab
- Region: Bahawalnagar Tehsil (partly) and Minchinabad Tehsil (partly) of Bahawalnagar District

Current constituency
- Created from: PP-278 Bahawalnagar-II (2002-2018); PP-238 Bahawalnagar-II (2018-)

PP-238 Bahawalnagar-II (پی پی-238، بہاولنگر-2) is a Constituency of Provincial Assembly of Punjab.

== General elections 2024 ==
Provincial election 2024: PP-238 Bahawalnagar-II
Party	Candidate	Votes	%	±%
Independent	Inam Bari	54,627	43.71	
PML(N)	Syed Nazar Muhammad Shah	49,468	39.58	
TLP	Muhammad Irfan	10,614	8.49	
Independent	Shahzad Rashid (Note: Filed nomination papers as PTI candidate but ECP allowed him to run as an Independent)	5,832	4.67	
Others	Others (eleven candidates)	4,440	3.55	
Turnout		128,443	60.20	
Total valid votes		124,981	97.30	
Rejected ballots		3,462	2.70	
Majority		5,159	4.13	
Registered electors		213,370		
hold				

== General elections 2018 ==
Provincial election 2018: PP-238 Bahawalnagar-II
Party	Candidate	Votes	%	±%
Independent	Shokat Ali Joyia Laleka	47,242	47.13	
PTI	Nazar Muhammad Alias Ahmad Nadeem	39,946	39.85	
TLP	Muhammad Arshad Khan	7,453	7.44	
PHP	Muhammad Yar	4,183	4.17	
Others	Others (seven candidates)	1,421	1.41	
Turnout		102,915	60.72	
Total valid votes		100,245	97.41	
Rejected ballots		2,670	2.59	
Majority		7,296	7.28	
Registered electors		169,505		

== General elections 2013 ==
Provincial election 2013: PP-278 Bahawalnagar-II
Party	Candidate	Votes	%	±%
PML(N)	Shoukat Ali Laleka	38,673	42.86	
Independent	Syed Nazar Mehmood Shah	27,888	30.91	
Independent	Muhammad Arshad Khan	5,060	5.61	
Independent	Syed Qalander Hasnain Shah	4,887	5.42	
PPP	Muhammad Tariq Ameen	4,426	4.91	
Jamiat Ulema-e-Pakistan	Masood Ul Hassan	4,207	4.66	
PTI	Syed Bukhtiar Ahmad Shah	2,647	2.93	
Others	Others (thirteen candidates)	2,441	2.71	
Turnout		94,954	65.19	
Total valid votes		90,229	95.02	
Rejected ballots		4,725	4.98	
Majority		10,785	11.95	
Registered electors		145,656		

== General elections 2008 ==
Contesting candidates	Party affiliation	Votes polled

== See also ==
- PP-237 Bahawalnagar-I
- PP-239 Bahawalnagar-III
