= Kala Dhari Mandir =

Hindu temple in Pakistan

- Location within Punjab, Pakistan Location within Pakistan Location within Asia

Religion
- Affiliation: Hinduism
- District: Bahawalpur

Location
- State: Punjab
- Country: Pakistan
- Interactive map of Kala Dhari Mandir
- Coordinates: 29°23′49.7″N 71°40′38.5″E

Architecture
- Type: Hindu temple

Kala Dhari Mandir or Shiri Nani Dev Kaala Dhari Jee Maharaaj Mandir is a historic Hindu temple in the Bahawalpur District of Punjab, Pakistan. It was built by Marathas around 300 years ago and was historically one of the most crowded Hindu temples in the Punjab State.

== Architecture ==
The floor of the temple is painted with black and white marble tiles. The temple pillars are carved and painted. The main gate of the temple has intricate carvings of gods and is currently kept at the Bahawalpur Museum. The windows, ventilators etc which have floral patterns and mythological figures were also kept at Bahawalpur Museum.

Other temple artefacts and paintings are currently kept at Lahore Museum.

== Current status ==
After the creation of Pakistan, majority of the Hindu population migrated to India. In 1953, the upper floor of the building was granted to a Muslim migrant family.

The temple is not functional and the Hindu community has been demanding the restoration of the temple and to allow worship in the temple.

Currently, the Evacuee Trust Property Board has rented out the first floor of the temple to tenants and the Bahawalpur Municipal Corporation also runs a primary school on temple’s premises.

== See also ==
- Hinduism in Punjab, Pakistan
