= Liaquatpur =

City in Punjab, Pakistan

Liaquatpur لِياقت پُور
- City
- Location within Punjab, Pakistan Location within Pakistan
- Coordinates: 28°56′07″N 70°57′03″E
- Country: Pakistan
- Province: Punjab
- District: Rahim Yar Khan
- Tehsil: Liaquatpur

Government
  - Type: Municipal Committee
  - Mayor: Sarmad Ali

Area
  - Total: 15.82 km^{2} (6.11 sq mi)
- Elevation: 96 m (315 ft)

Population (2023)
  - Total: 66,933
  - Density: 4,231/km^{2} (10,960/sq mi)
- Time zone: UTC+5 (PST)
- Postal code: 64200
- Calling code: 068
- Website: Tehsil Administration Website

Liaquatpur (Urdu: لِياقت پُور) is a city and capital of Liaquatpur Tehsil in Rahim Yar Khan District, Punjab, Pakistan. It is located north of Liaquatpur Tehsil, about 90 kilometres to the northeast of Rahim Yar Khan. As of 2017, it has a total population of 51,888. Liaquat Pur is the biggest market of jaggery (Gur) in South Asia.

== Geography ==
Liaquatpur is situated to the east of the Indus River. The Lahore Railway Line passes through the city. Its average elevation is 96 metres above the sea level.

== Demographics ==
Population

Historical population
Year	Pop.	±%
1972	8,699	—
1981	15,271	+75.5%
1998	32,858	+115.2%
2017	51,888	+57.9%
2023	66,933	+29.0%

According to official 2023 census results, the population of Liaquatpur city is 66,933.

== Railway ==
Liaquat Pur railway station (Urdu and Punjabi: لِياقت پُور ریلوے اسٹیشن) is located in Liaquatpur on main railway line. From north it becomes the first railway station in Rahim Yar Khan district. The railway station is centered in the city's territory as it divides the city into two parts. The right side of the city is called Kachi Mandi while the opposite is known as Pakki Mandi. The railway line was first planned in 1883 when it was in British India. In 1889 a single line of a Broad gauge was laid. Later it became a two line link and in 1903 a station was built here and was named after this town "Chaudri". After the independence of Pakistan, in 1956 the name was changed to Liaquat Pur in honour of Pakistan's first Prime Minister Liaquat Ali Khan.

== Climate ==
According to the Köppen climate classification, Liaquatpur has a hot desert climate (BWh). On average, its driest month is November, with 2 mm of precipitation; and the wettest month is August, with 53 mm of precipitation.

Climate data for Liaquatpur
Month	Jan	Feb	Mar	Apr	May	Jun	Jul	Aug	Sep	Oct	Nov	Dec	Year
Mean daily maximum °C (°F)	21.2 (70.2)	24.2 (75.6)	30.4 (86.7)	37.2 (99.0)	41.8 (107.2)	41.9 (107.4)	39.6 (103.3)	37.6 (99.7)	36.8 (98.2)	34.5 (94.1)	28.5 (83.3)	23.2 (73.8)	33.1 (91.5)
Daily mean °C (°F)	14.3 (57.7)	17.3 (63.1)	23.2 (73.8)	29.7 (85.5)	34.6 (94.3)	36.2 (97.2)	34.9 (94.8)	33 (91)	31.4 (88.5)	27.3 (81.1)	21.2 (70.2)	15.9 (60.6)	26.6 (79.8)
Mean daily minimum °C (°F)	7.4 (45.3)	10.1 (50.2)	15.5 (59.9)	21.3 (70.3)	26.4 (79.5)	29.8 (85.6)	29.8 (85.6)	28.4 (83.1)	26.2 (79.2)	20 (68)	14 (57)	8.9 (48.0)	19.8 (67.6)
Average rainfall mm (inches)	5 (0.2)	10 (0.4)	10 (0.4)	8 (0.3)	8 (0.3)	14 (0.6)	47 (1.9)	53 (2.1)	27 (1.1)	4 (0.2)	2 (0.1)	5 (0.2)	193 (7.8)
Source: Climate-Data.org

== See also ==
- Liaquat Pur railway station
