= PP-260 Rahim Yar Khan-VI =

Constituency of the Punjabi Provincial Legislature, Pakistan

- Constituency for the Provincial Assembly of Punjab
- Region: Khanpur Tehsil (partly) including Zāhir Pīr town and Rahim Yar Khan Tehsil (partly) of Rahim Yar Khan District

Current constituency
- Created from: PP-288 Rahim Yar Khan-IV (2002-2018); PP-259 Rahim Yar Khan-V (2018-2023)

PP-260 Rahim Yar Khan-VI (پی پی-260، رحیم یار خان-6) is a Constituency of Provincial Assembly of Punjab.

== General elections 2024 ==
Provincial election 2024: PP-260 Rahim Yar Khan-VI
Party	Candidate	Votes	%	±%
Independent	Saima Kanwal (Note: Filed nomination papers as PTI candidate but ECP allowed him to run as an Independent)	54,986	50.50	
IPP	Hashim Jawan Bakht	20,824	19.13	
PPP	Makhdoom Tahir Rashid Ud Din	20,672	18.99	
JUI (F)	Zahid Masood	3,577	3.29	
TLP	Muhammad Zia Ur Rehman	2,804	2.58	
PML(N)	Nazeer Hussain Khan Rind Baloch	2,486	2.28	
Others	Others (ten candidates)	3,532	3.23	
Turnout		112,512	46.05	
Total valid votes		108,881	96.77	
Rejected ballots		3,631	3.23	
Majority		34,162	31.37	
Registered electors		244,328		
hold				

== General elections 2018 ==
Provincial election 2018: PP-259 Rahim Yar Khan-V
Party	Candidate	Votes	%	±%
PTI	Makhdum Hashim Jawan Bakht	46,582	45.25	
PPP	Makhdoom Muhammad Irtaza Hashmi	26,012	25.27	
PML(N)	Sardar Muhammad Nawaz Khan	24,288	23.59	
Independent	Nazir Ahmed	1,482	1.44	
MMA	Muhammad Umar Awan	1,196	1.16	
Others	Others (thirteen candidates)	3,393	3.29	
Turnout		106,079	53.80	
Total valid votes		102,953	97.05	
Rejected ballots		3,126	2.95	
Majority		20,570	19.98	
Registered electors		197,160		

== General elections 2013 ==
Provincial election 2013: PP-288 Rahim Yar Khan-IV
Party	Candidate	Votes	%	±%
Independent	Sardar Muhammad Nawaz Khan	19,940	29.19	
PPP	Mian Ghulam Mohai Ud Din	19,248	28.18	
PML(N)	Iqbal Farid	10,992	16.09	
Independent	Muhammad Yaqoob Khan	5,381	7.88	
PTI	Rashid Saeed Khan	4,517	6.61	
Independent	Umar Hayat	3,606	5.28	
Others	Others (twenty candidates)	4,631	6.78	
Turnout		71,332	55.76	
Total valid votes		68,315	95.77	
Rejected ballots		3,017	4.23	
Majority		692	1.01	
Registered electors		127,931		

== General elections 2008 ==
Contesting candidates	Party affiliation	Votes polled

== See also ==
- PP-259 Rahim Yar Khan-V
- PP-261 Rahim Yar Khan-VII
