= PP-259 Rahim Yar Khan-V =

Constituency of the Punjabi Provincial Legislature, Pakistan

- Constituency for the Provincial Assembly of Punjab
- Region: Khanpur Tehsil (partly) of Rahim Yar Khan District

Current constituency
- Created from: PP-289 Rahimyar Khan-V (2002-2018); PP-258 Rahim Yar Khan-IV (2018-2023)

PP-259 Rahim Yar Khan-V (پی پی-259، رحیم یار خان-5) is a Constituency of Provincial Assembly of Punjab.

== General elections 2024 ==
Provincial election 2024: PP-259 Rahim Yar Khan-V
Party	Candidate	Votes	%	±%
Independent	Faisal Jamil (Note: Filed nomination papers as PTI candidate but ECP allowed him to run as an independent)	53,019	44.50	
Independent	Mian Shafi Muhammad	20,824	17.48	
PPP	Qammar Ud Din Khan	19,838	16.65	
PML(N)	Syed Gul Hassan Shah	17,025	14.29	
TLP	Muhammad Naeem	2,606	2.19	
JUI (F)	Zia Ur Rehman	2,345	1.97	
Others	Others (ten candidates)	3,484	2.92	
Turnout		123,467	47.93	
Total valid votes		119,141	96.50	
Rejected ballots		4,326	3.50	
Majority		32,195	27.02	
Registered electors		257,606		
hold				

== General elections 2018 ==
Provincial election 2018: PP-258 Rahim Yar Khan-IV
Party	Candidate	Votes	%	±%
PTI	Mian Shafi Muhammad	42,496	39.36	
PPP	Mian Muhammad Aslam	31,478	29.15	
PML(N)	Syed Gul Hassan Shah	22,454	20.80	
ARP	Sajid Hameed Khan	2,989	2.77	
Independent	Bilal Anmad	2,886	2.67	
Independent	Israr Ul Haq	1,172	1.09	
Others	Others (nine candidates)	4,505	4.16	
Turnout		111,438	54.34	
Total valid votes		107,980	96.90	
Rejected ballots		3,458	3.10	
Majority		11,018	10.21	
Registered electors		205,081		

== General elections 2013 ==
Provincial election 2013: PP-289 Rahim Yar Khan-V
Party	Candidate	Votes	%	±%
Independent	Makhdoom Khusro Bakhtiar	25,898	35.95	
PPP	Mian Muhammad Aslam Advocate	23,028	31.97	
PML(N)	Abdul Jabbar	7,450	10.34	
PTI	Dr. Zia Ullah Jatoi	6,886	9.56	
JUI (F)	Aziz Ur Rehman Darkhawasti	5,450	7.57	
Independent	Sardar Irshad Ahmad Khan	1,553	2.16	
Others	Others (eleven candidates)	1,771	2.46	
Turnout		75,241	56.39	
Total valid votes		72,036	95.74	
Rejected ballots		3,205	4.26	
Majority		2,870	3.98	
Registered electors		133,419		

== General elections 2008 ==
Contesting candidates	Party affiliation	Votes polled

== See also ==
- PP-258 Rahim Yar Khan-IV
- PP-260 Rahim Yar Khan-VI
