= Muhammad Ejaz Shafi =

Pakistani politician

Member of the Provincial Assembly of the Punjab
- Incumbent
- Assumed office 23 March 2024
- In office 2002 – 31 May 2018

Personal details
- Born: Khanpur, Punjab, Pakistan
- Party: PTI (2022-present)
- Other political affiliations: PMLN (2018-2022); PML(Q) (2002-2008)

Muhammad Ejaz Shafi is a Pakistani politician who was a Member of the Provincial Assembly of the Punjab, from 2002 to May 2018.

== Early life and education ==
He was born on 1 May 1969 in Khanpur.

He has the degree of the Bachelor of Arts.

== Political career ==
He was elected to the Provincial Assembly of the Punjab as a candidate of Pakistan Muslim League (Q) (PML-Q) from Constituency PP-290 (Rahimyar Khan-VI) in the 2002 Pakistani general election. He received 22,531 votes and defeated a candidate of Pakistan Awami Tehrik.

He was re-elected to the Provincial Assembly of the Punjab as a candidate of PML-Q from Constituency PP-290 (Rahimyar Khan-VI) in the 2008 Pakistani general election. He received 24,751 votes and defeated a candidate of Pakistan Peoples Party.

He was re-elected to the Provincial Assembly of the Punjab as a candidate of Pakistan Muslim League (N) from Constituency PP-290 (Rahimyar Khan-VI) in the 2013 Pakistani general election.

== Suspension ==
On 28 June 2025, Shafi was among 26 members of the opposition who were suspended from the Punjab Assembly for 15 sittings. The action was taken by Speaker Malik Muhammad Ahmed Khan following a disruption during Chief Minister Maryam Nawaz's address. The suspended lawmakers were accused of disorderly conduct, including chanting slogans, tearing official documents, and surrounding the speaker’s dais. The speaker also forwarded references against the suspended members to the Election Commission of Pakistan for further action.
