= Liaquatpur Tehsil =

Tehsil of Punjab, Pakistan

Liaquatpur Tehsil تحصِيل لِياقت پُور
- Tehsil
- Tehsil Municipal Administration logo

- Location of Liaquatpur Tehsil in Punjab, Pakistan
- Country: Pakistan
- Region: (Punjab, Pakistan) Punjab
- District: Rahimyar Khan
- Capital: Liaquatpur
- Union councils: 25

Government
  - Type: Tehsil Municipal Administration
  - Administrator: Asif Iqbal
  - Chairman Municipal Committee: Rashid Rafiquee

Area
  - Tehsil: 3,262 km^{2} (1,259 sq mi)

Population (2023)
  - Tehsil: 1,235,264
  - Density: 378.7/km^{2} (980.8/sq mi)
  - Urban: 102,672 (8.31%)
  - Rural: 1,132,592 (91.69%)

Literacy (2023)
  - Literacy rate: 38.35%
- Time zone: UTC+5 (PST)
- Postal code: 64000
- Website: TMA Liaquatpur

Liaquatpur (تحصِيل لِياقت پُور) is a tehsil located in Rahimyar Khan District, Punjab, Pakistan. Its capital is Liaquatpur. It is administratively subdivided into 25 Union Councils. Under British colonial rule, Liaqatpur emerged as an important agricultural center, with the development of irrigation systems and the introduction of new crops like cotton and sugarcane.

== Demographics ==
=== Population ===
Historical population
| Year | Pop. | ±% p.a. |
|---|---|---|
| 1951 | 144,479 | — |
| 1961 | 227,940 | +4.67% |
| 1972 | 305,251 | +2.69% |
| 1981 | 395,127 | +2.91% |
| 1998 | 698,985 | +3.41% |
| 2017 | 1,035,509 | +2.09% |
| 2023 | 1,235,264 | +2.98% |

As of the 2023 census, Liaquatpur Tehsil has population of 1,235,264.

Majority of the population are Muslims (98.2%). Hinduism is practised by 1.4% of the population. Other minorities include Christians and Ahmadiyyas.
