= Bahawalpur Saddar Tehsil =

- Tehsil
- Country: Pakistan
- Region: (Punjab, Pakistan) Punjab
- District: Bahawalpur
- Capital: Bahawalpur
- Towns: 1
- Union councils: 36

Area
  - Tehsil: 745 km^{2} (288 sq mi)

Population (2023)
  - Tehsil: 675,950
  - Density: 907/km^{2} (2,350/sq mi)
  - Urban: 150,954 (22.33%)
  - Rural: 524,996 (77.67%)

Literacy (2023)
  - Literacy rate: 52.56%
- Time zone: UTC+5 (PST)

Bahawalpur Saddar is a tehsil located in Bahawalpur District in the southern part of the Punjab province, Pakistan. The city of Bahawalpur is the headquarters of the tehsil which is administratively subdivided into 36 union councils. The tehsil is traversed by the Hakra depression, south of which lies the desert. The north lies in the Sutlej riverain, and between this and the Hakra are the central uplands.

== History ==
Prior to the independence of Pakistan, Bahawalpur was the headquarters tehsil of the state and nizamat of Bahawalpur. The population, according to the 1901 of census, was 91,954, compared with 90,031 in 1891. The chief city Bahawalpur, also the capital of the State, had a population of 18,546. The tehsil contained 107 villages. The total land revenue and cesses between 1905 and 1906 was one hundred thousand.

Saraiki is the most spoken language in Bahawalpur. Punjabi is also spoken by number of people.

== Demographics ==
=== Population ===
Historical population
Year	Pop.	±% p.a.
1951	...	—
1961	...	—
1972	...	—
1981	...	—
1998	...	—
2017	574,950	—
2023	675,950	+2.73%

As of the 2023 census, Bahawalpur Saddar Tehsil has population of 675,950.
