= Bahawalpur District =

District in Punjab, Pakistan

Bahawalpur District ضلع بہاول پور
- District
- Bahawalpur District
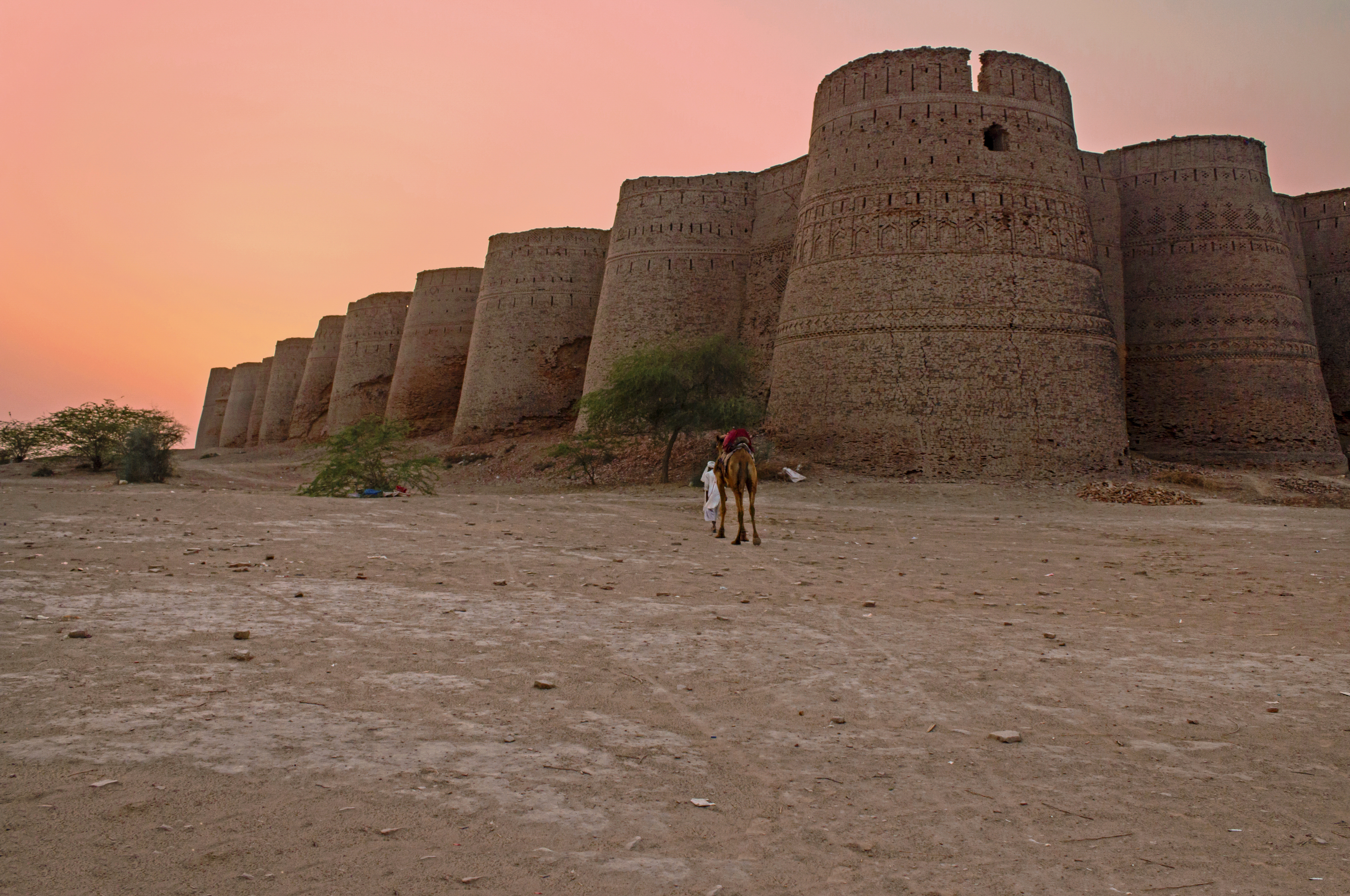
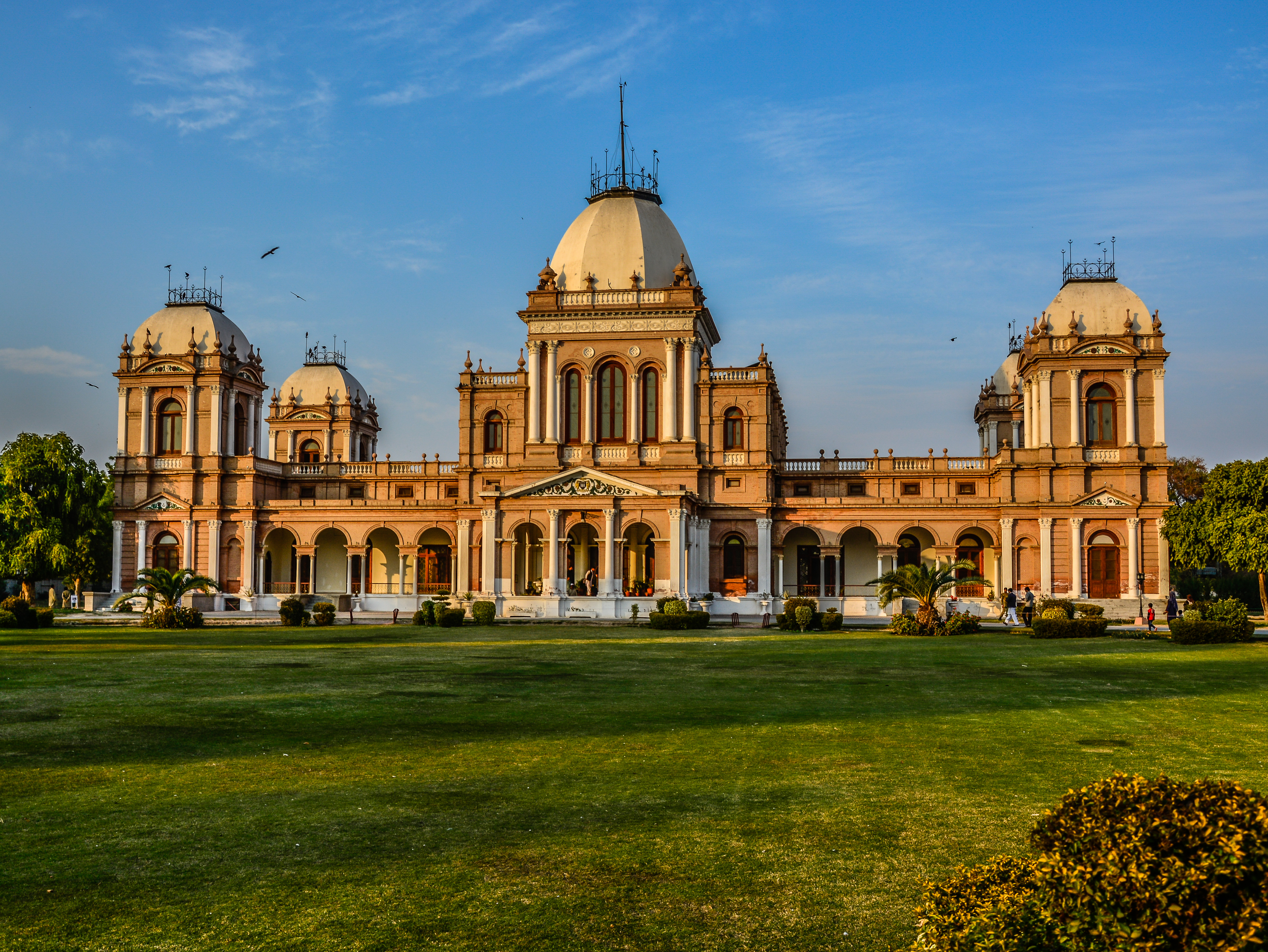
- Top: Derawar Fort; Bottom: Noor Mahal, Bahawalpur

- Map of Bahawalpur District highlighted in red
- Country: Pakistan
- Province: Punjab
- Division: Bahawalpur
- Headquarters: Bahawalpur

Government
  - Type: District Administration
  - Deputy Commissioner: Anwar Zaheer Jappa
  - District Police Officer: Syed Muhammad Abbas
  - District Health Officer: N/A

Area
  - District: 24,830 km^{2} (9,590 sq mi)

Population (2023 Pakistani census)
  - District: 4,284,964
  - Density: 172.6/km^{2} (447.0/sq mi)
  - Urban: 1,619,321 (37.79%)
  - Rural: 2,665,643 (62.21%)

Literacy
  - Literacy rate: Total: (53.35%); Male: (59.40%); Female: (47.09%)
- Time zone: UTC+5 (PKT)
- Area code: 062
- Number of Tehsils: 6
- Tehsils: Bahawalpur City Tehsil; Ahmedpur Sharqia; Hasilpur; Khairpur Tamewali; Yazman; Bahawalpur Saddar
- Languages: Saraiki, Punjabi and Urdu
- Website: bahawalpur.punjab.gov.pk

Bahawalpur District (Note: Punjabi: ضلع بہاولپور Urdu: ضلع بہاول پور) is a district within the Bahawalpur Division of Punjab, Pakistan, with the city of Bahawalpur serving as the district headquarters.

It has a population of over 4.2 million (2023 census) and covers an area of 24,830 km^{2}, being the largest district in Punjab.

Approximately two-thirds of the district (16,000 km^{2}) is covered by the Cholistan Desert, which extends into the Thar Desert of Pakistan and India. The district is a major producer of cotton in Pakistan.

Located in the south of the Punjab province, Bahawalpur district is bordered by India to its south and southeast, Bahawalnagar to its northeast, Vehari, Lodhran and Multan to its north, Rahimyar Khan to its west, and Muzaffargarh to its northwest.

== History ==
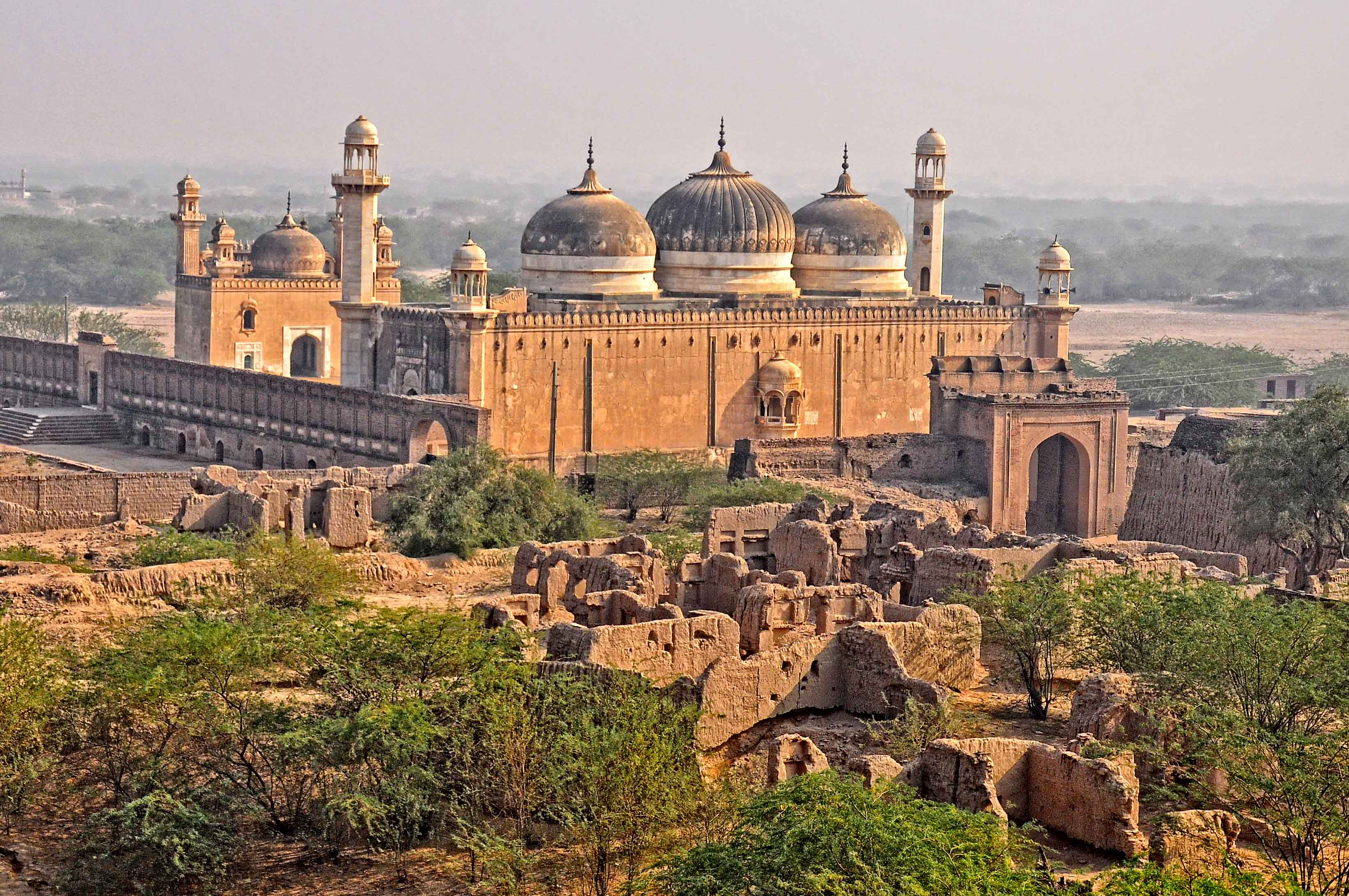
Abbasi Masjid near Derawar Fort

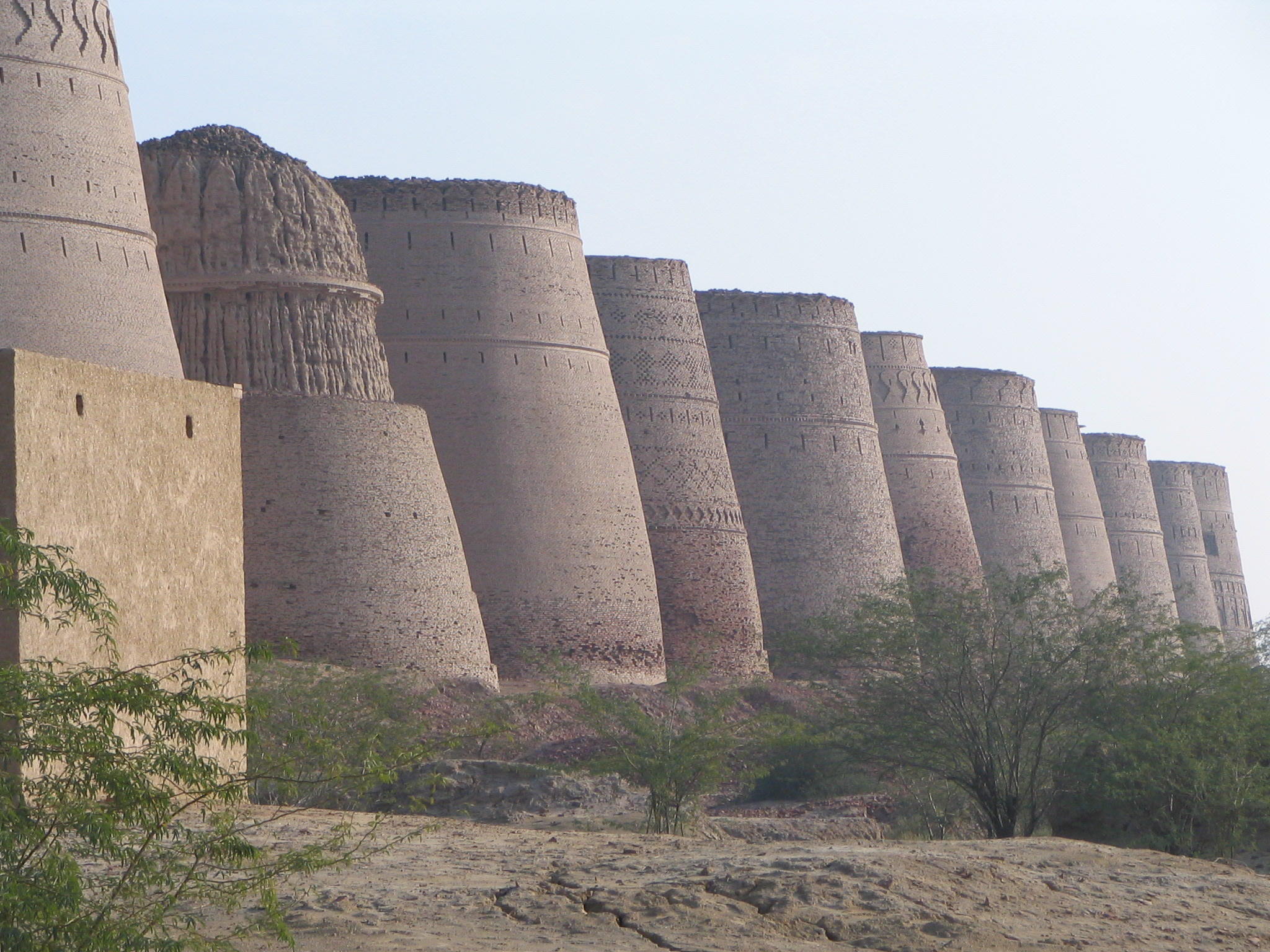
Derawar Fort in Cholistan Desert

In 711 A.D. the various parts of Punjab and the whole Sindh came under the Arab rule when Muhammad Bin Qasim conquered Sindh, Multan and surrounding areas. The region came securely under the control of the Umayyad Caliphate. The tribes known as Arain in the region sometimes claim descent from the Arab soldiers who accompanied Muhammad Bin Qasim.

Sultan Mahmud Ghaznavi took over the region in 997 C.E. for the Ghaznavid dynasty empire established by his father, Sultan Sebuktegin. He conquered the Shahis in Kabul in 1005 and followed it by the conquest of Punjab. The Delhi Sultanate and later the Mughal Empire ruled the region. The Punjab region became predominantly Muslim due to missionary Sufi saints whose dargahs dot the landscape of Punjab. During the period of British rule, Bahawalpur District increased in population and importance.

The district capital Bahawalpur, which lies just south of the Sutlej River, was founded in 1748 by Muhammad Bahawal Khan and was incorporated as a municipality in 1874. After the decline of the Mughal Empire, the Sikh Empire invaded some towns of modern Pakistan's Punjab province but Bahawalpur had a stronghold of the state's Abbasi nawabs in the city management and the town was free of Sikh Empire.

In 1836, Bahawalpur stopped paying tribute to Sikh empire. The state's army had defended the territory and openly declared independence. The founder of the State of Bahawalpur was Nawab Bahawal Khan Abbasi I. The Abbasi family ruled over the State for more than 200 years (1748 to 1954). During the rule of the last Nawab Sir Sadiq Muhammad Khan V, Bahawalpur State was merged with Pakistan. In 1954, the Nawab agreed (Agreement dated 3 October 1947) for Bahawalpur to be absorbed into modern Pakistan. He was, however, given special privileges including the right to import several cars duty-free each year. Bahawalpur was formerly the capital of the state and now is the District and Divisional Headquarters of Bahawalpur Division.

The Nawabs of Bahawalpur originally came from Sindh and claimed descent from the Abbasid caliph of Baghdad; they formed a princely state and assumed independence in 1802.

The predominantly Muslim population in British India supported Muslim League and Pakistan Movement. After the independence of Pakistan in 1947, the minority Hindus and Sikhs migrated to India while the Muslim refugees from India settled in Bahawalpur District.

== Geography ==
Bahawalpur is located in the southeast of Punjab province, the capital, Bahawalpur city, is 889 km from Karachi. The region surrounding Bahawalpur to the west, called the Sindh, is a fertile alluvial tract in the Sutlej River valley that is irrigated by floodwaters, planted with groves of date palms, and thickly populated. The chief crops are wheat, gram, cotton, sugarcane, and dates. Sheep and cattle are raised for export of wool and hides.

East of Bahawalpur is the Pat, or Bar, a tract of land considerably higher than the adjoining valley. It is chiefly desert irrigated by the Sutlej inundation canals and yields crops of wheat, cotton, and sugarcane. Farther east, the Rohi, or Cholistan, is a barren desert tract, bounded on the north and west by the Hakra depression with mound ruins of old settlements along its high banks; it is still inhabited by nomads. The principal inhabitants of the region surrounding Bahawalpur are Arain, Jat and Baluchi peoples. There are many historical sites in the area, including Uch, southwest of Bahawalpur, an ancient town dating from Indo-Scythian (Yüeh-chih) settlement (c. 128 BC to AD 450).

Bahawalpur is also an important agricultural training and educational center. Soapmaking and cotton ginning are important enterprises; cotton, silk, embroidery, carpets, and extraordinarily delicate pottery are produced. Factories producing cottonseed oil and cottonseed cake were built in the 1970s. It is an important marketing centre for the surrounding areas and is located on the crossroads between Peshawar, Lahore, Quetta and Karachi. Bahawalpur is also known for its distinctly embroidered slippers and shoes and the filigree pottery which is made here.

The city of Bahawalpur is located favourably for commerce, lying at the junction of trade routes from the east, south-east, and south. It is a centre for trade in wheat, cotton, millet, and rice grown in the surrounding region. Dates and mangoes are also grown here. Canals supply water for irrigation from the river sources. The principal industries are cotton ginning, rice and flour milling, and the handweaving of textiles.

=== Cholistan Desert ===
East of Bahawalpur is the Cholistan Desert which covers about an area of 20,000 km^{2} of Bahawalpur and 1000 km^{2} of Rahim Yar Khan and extends into the Thar Desert of India. It is six-and-a-half million acres of sprawling desert. The region was once watered by the Hakra River. At one time, there were 400 forts in the area and archaeological finds around the Derawar Fort, the only place with a perennial waterhole, indicate that it was contemporaneous with the Indus Valley Civilisation.

The average annual rainfall is only 12 cm, and the little cultivation that exists is made possible by underground wells, with water drawn up by the camels. The water is stored in troughs, built by the tribes, between sandhills and din waterholes called tobas. The forts here were built at 29 km intervals, which probably served as guard posts for the camel caravan routes. There were three rows of these forts. The first line of forts began from Phulra and went to Lera, the second from Rukhanpur to Islamgarh, and the third from Bilcaner to Kapoo. They are all in ruins now, and you can see that they were built with double walls of gypsum blocks and mud. Some of them date back to 1000 BCE, and were destroyed and rebuilt many times.

== Administration ==
The district is administratively divided into 5 tehsils and 107 Union Councils:

Tehsil	Area (km²)	Pop. (2023)	Density (ppl/km²) (2023)	Literacy rate (2023)	Union Councils
Ahmedpur Sharqia	1,738	1,307,578	752.35	39.68%	31
Bahawalpur City	1,490	815,202	547.12	71.67%	36
Bahawalpur Saddar	745	675,950	907.32	52.56%	...
Hasilpur	1,490	508,415	341.22	59.64%	14
Khairpur Tamewali	993	290,582	292.63	45.82%	8
Yazman	18,374	687,237	37.40	53.55%	18
Total		4,284,964			107

== Demographics ==
=== Population ===
Historical population
Year	Pop.	±% p.a.
1951	527,837	—
1961	735,524	+3.37%
1972	1,071,026	+3.48%
1981	1,453,438	+3.45%
1998	2,433,091	+3.08%
2017	3,669,176	+2.19%
2023	4,284,964	+2.62%

As of the 2023 census, Bahawalpur district has 673,437 households and a population of 4,284,964. The district has a sex ratio of 103.10 males to 100 females and a literacy rate of 53.35%: 59.40% for males and 47.09% for females. 1,231,401 (28.88% of the surveyed population) are under 10 years of age. 1,619,321 (37.79%) live in urban areas.

=== Religion ===
Religion in Bahawalpur district (2023)
Religion	Percent
Islam	98.14%
Hinduism	1.14%
Christianity	0.65%
Other or not stated	0.07%

Muslims are the predominant religious community with 98.14% of the population while Hindus were 1.14% of the population, living mainly in rural areas of Yazman tehsil. Christians (0.65%) are another minority, living mostly in urban areas. The Kala Dhari Mandir is one of the historic Hindu temple in the district, however it's not operational now. The Hindu community has been demanding its renovation and reopening for worshipping.

Religion in Bahawalpur District
Religion	2017		2023	
Religion	Pop.	%	Pop.	%
Islam	3,608,204	98.34%	4,185,348	98.14%
Hinduism	41,051	1.12%	48,684	1.14%
Christianity	17,571	0.48%	27,651	0.65%
Ahmadi	1,680	0.05%	1,234	0.03%
Others (Note: Including Jainism, Buddhism, Zoroastrianism, Judaism, Sikhism or not stated)	670	0.01%	1,540	0.04%
Total Population	3,669,176	100%	4,264,457	100%

=== Languages ===
Languages of Bahawalpur district (2023)
1. Saraiki (67.9%)
2. Punjabi (24.2%)
3. Urdu (5.50%)
4. Others (2.40%)

At the time of the 2023 census, 67.87% of the population spoke Saraiki, 24.19% identified with Punjabi, and 5.47% Urdu as their first language.

== Transportation ==
Buses run daily between Bahawalpur and other major cities of Pakistan. Pakistan's longest national highway, N-5, also passes through town, connecting Bahawalpur to Karachi and Lahore.

== Economy ==
The main crops for which Bahawalpur is recognized are cotton, sugarcane, wheat, sunflower seeds, rape/mustard seed, and rice. Bahawalpur mangoes, citrus, dates, and guavas are some of the fruits exported out of the country. Vegetables include onions, tomatoes, cauliflower, potatoes, and carrots. Being an expanding industrial city, the government has revolutionized and liberalized various markets allowing the caustic soda, cotton ginning and pressing, flour mills, fruit juices, general engineering, iron, and steel re-rolling mills, looms, oil mills, poultry feed, sugar, textile spinning, textile weaving, vegetable ghee and cooking oil industries to flourish.

== See also ==
- Bahawalpur Airport
- Bahawalpur railway station
- India–Pakistan relations
- Districts of Pakistan
  - Districts of Khyber Pakhtunkhwa, Pakistan
  - Districts of Punjab, Pakistan
  - Districts of Balochistan, Pakistan
  - Districts of Sindh, Pakistan
  - Districts of Azad Kashmir
  - Districts of Gilgit-Baltistan
- Divisions of Pakistan
  - Divisions of Balochistan
  - Divisions of Khyber Pakhtunkhwa
  - Divisions of Punjab
  - Divisions of Sindh
  - Divisions of Azad Kashmir
  - Divisions of Gilgit-Baltistan
