= Rajan Pur Kalan =

Rajan Pur Kalan راجن پور کلاں Rajan Pur Dahiran Wali
- Town
- Nickname: RPK
- Location within Punjab, Pakistan Location within Pakistan
- Coordinates: 28°36′11″N 70°10′16″E
- Country: Pakistan
- Province: Punjab
- Division: Bahawalpur
- District: Rahim Yar Khan
- Tehsil: Rahim Yar Khan
- NA: 178
- PP: 264

Government
  - Type: Union Council
- Elevation: 266 ft (81 m)

Population (Census 2017)
  - Town: 20,000
- Time zone: UTC+5 (PST)
- Postal Code: 64311
- Dialling Code: 068
- Acronym: RPK
- Demonym: Rajanpuri
- Highways & Motorways: N-5 M-5
- Website: www.mcrahimyarkhan.lgpunjab.org.pk

Rajan Pur Kalan (Urdu: راجن پور کلاں), is a Union Council and a small town of Tehsil Rahim Yar Khan and Rahim Yar Khan District in the far southwestern part of Punjab, Pakistan. It is also known as Rajan Pur Dahiran Wali (راجن پور ڈاہراں والی) or Chooti (minor) Rajan Pur. This town is situated almost 32 kilometres (20 mi) to the north of Rahim Yar Khan city. This town lies south of the Indus River and on the bank of Dallas Canal.

== Mouza (مواضعات) ==
Union Council Rajan Pur Kalan is further divided into four Mouzas (مواضعات)

- Rajan Pur Kalan (راجن پور کلاں)
- Rajan Pur Khurd (راجن پور خورد)
- Qaisar Chohan (قیصر چوہان)
- Fazal Abad (فضل آباد)

== Basic facilities ==
- Many government schools, private schools, and Madaris (دینی مدارس)
- Rural health center
- Vocational training institute by TEVTA Punjab
- Union council office

== Nearby famous places or villages ==
- Kot Karam Khan
- Degi Bangla
- Head Degi
- Hassan Abad
- Mud Manthar
- Qaisar Chohan
- Badli Sharif
- Chak Sikhaan
- Deera Musheer
- Imam Nagar
- Adda Muhammad Pur
- Dera Musheer
- Muslim abad
- Basti Havali Ghous Shah
- Motorway M-5 Rahim Yar Khan Interchange

== See also ==
- Kot Karam Khan
- Doctor Muhammad Aslam
- Bhong Masjid
- Patan minara
