= Bangla Manthar =

Manthar
- Town
- Bangla Manthar
- Location within Pakistan
- Coordinates: 28.11°N 70.13°E
- Pakistan: Pakistan
- Province: Punjab
- District: Rahim Yar Khan District
- Tehsil: Rahim Yar Khan Sadiqabad

Area
  - Total: 240 km^{2} (93 sq mi)
- Elevation: 92 m (302 ft)
- Time zone: UTC+5 (PST)
- Calling code: 068

Bangla Manthar is a small town in Rahim Yar Khan District in the Punjab province of Pakistan. It is also known as Manthar and Manthar Bangla.

It is about 32.4 km away from Rahim Yar Khan city, via a direct road link. It is about 19.4 km away from Sadiqabad city (with a direct road link). There is a mill of ethanol, called "United Ethanol Mill Limited", about 3 km away from Bangla Manthar on Sadiqabad-Bangla Manthar Road. Manthar contains a historic Bangla-type building that is now deteriorated. A mainstream canal along with a small canal passes from manthar. It provides a living hood to several people living beside it. The Rural Health Centre (RHC) of Manthar is operationalized to provide basic health facilities for the public. The rural veterinary hospital is built to provide veterinary health facilities in the area.

== History ==
Bangla Manthar has a rich history tied to both spiritual and princely heritage. The town is named after the Sufi saint Hazrat Faqir Manthar Sain, who migrated from Balochistan and settled in the region when it was surrounded by dense forests near the Indus River.

=== Princely Era and the "Bangla" ===
In the 1920s, during the reign of Sadiq Muhammad Khan V, the Nawab of Bahawalpur State, a grand government rest house was built for royal hunting. This building was known as the "Bangla," which eventually gave the town its name.

=== The Shar Tribe and 'Amir-e-Shikar' ===
The Shar Tribe was assigned to protect the state's borders and hunting grounds. For his bravery, the Nawab awarded Muhammad Mochara Shar the royal title of Amir-e-Shikar (Chief of Hunting). As a reward for their loyalty, the tribe was granted land (Jagir) in Chak 140-P East and surrounding areas.
