= N-5 National Highway =

National highway in Pakistan

National Highway 5
- قومی شاہراہ ٥
- قومی شاہراہ ۵

Route information
- Part of AH1, AH2, AH4
- Length: 1,819 km (1,130 mi)
- Existed: 1913–present

Major junctions
- South end: Karachi
- N-110 Gharo Interchange; N-55 Kotri Interchange; N-305 Sakrand Interchange; Tarind Interchange; M-4 Shah Shams Tabrez Interchange; Bahawalpur Bypass Interchange; Lahore Ring Road Thokar Niaz Baig Interchange; Lahore Ring Road Niazi Biag Interchange; N-60 Shahdara Interchange; Lahore Bypass; Islamabad Expressway T-Chowk Interchange; Kashmir Highway Motorway Interchange; N-125 Taxila Interchange; N-35 Hasan Abdal Interchange N-45 Nowshera Interchange; M-1-N-5 Link Road Interchange; Peshawar Ring Road Eastern Interchange; Peshawar Ring Road Western Interchange
- North end: Torkham

Location
- Country: Pakistan

Highway system
- Roads in Pakistan

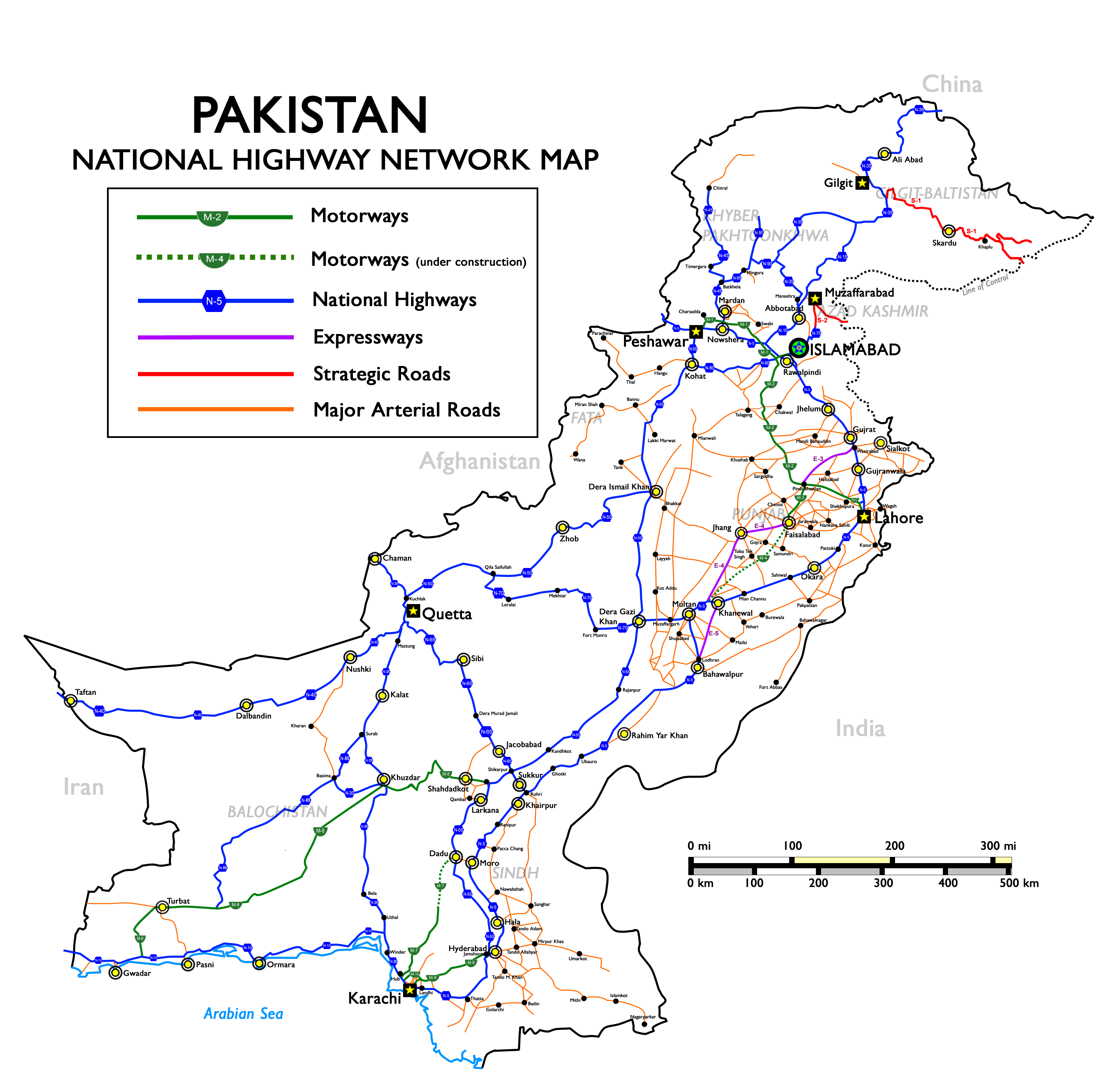
Map of National Highways of Pakistan also indicating N5

The N-5 or National Highway 5 (Urdu: قومی شاہراہ ۵) is an 1819 km national highway in Pakistan, which extends from Karachi in Sindh to Torkham in Khyber Pakhtunkhwa.

== Route ==
The N-5 is the longest national highway in Pakistan and serves as an important north–south road artery, starting from Karachi and extending through Hyderabad, Moro and Sukkur in Sindh before crossing into Punjab province where it passes through Multan, Sahiwal, Lahore, Gujranwala, Gujrat, Lalamusa, Kharian, Jhelum and Rawalpindi. At Rawalpindi, it turns westwards and passes through Attock Khurd before crossing the Indus River into Khyber Pakhtunkhwa to continue through Nowshera and Peshawar before entering the Khyber Pass and reaching the town of Torkham on the border with Afghanistan. Of its total length, 1021 km is in Punjab, 671 km in Sindh, and 165 km in Khyber Pakhtunkhwa. It is managed by the National Highway Authority.

== Upgradation ==
The federal government has approved a major upgrade of the Grand Trunk (G.T.) Road (N-5) for conversion into a uniform three-lane carriageway.

== History ==
Part of the highway was built on the ancient Grand Trunk Road (commonly known as G.T. Road) which came under jurisdiction of the new state after the independence of Pakistan in 1947. The historical Grand Trunk Route extended from Wagha, Punjab to Peshawar, Khyber Pakhtunkhwa. The original highways were Peshawar-Torkham Road, Grand Trunk Road (Peshawar-Lahore), Lahore-Multan Road, Multan-Bahawalpur Road, KLP Road (Bahawal Pur-Rahim Yar Khan), Karachi-Rahim Yar Khan Road.

== Junctions and interchanges ==
=== Sindh ===
Number	Location	Km marker no
1	Karachi	00
2	Thatta	94
3	Kotri	145
4	Hyderabad	163
5	Matiari	190
6	New Saeedabad	229
7	Sabu Rahu	240
8	Sakrand	250
9	Sukhio Manahejo	264
10	Kazi Ahmed	275
11	Nawab wali muhammad	291
12	Daulatpur	302
13	Shahpur Jehanian	310
14	Moro	320
15	Naushahro Feroze	345
16	Bhiria	356
17	Kandiaro	373
18	Kotri Kabir	391
19	Ranipur	413
20	Kot Diji	437
21	Khairpur	458
22	Sukkur	470
23	Pano Akil	515
24	Ghotki	543
25	Sarhad	554
26	Mirpur Mathelo	568
27	Daharki	582
28	Ubauro	596

=== Punjab ===
Number	Location	Km marker no
28	Kot Sabzal	612
29	Sanjarpur	620
30	Sadiqabad	637
31	Iqbalabad	655
32	Sheikh wahan	677
33	Mianwali Quraishan	687
34	Sardar Garh	693
35	Zahir Pir	707
36	Fatehpur Kamal	719
37	Khan Bela	734
38	Tarinda Muhammad Panah	756
39	Ahmadpur East	792
40	Deran	794
41	Nurpur Nauranga	814
42	Khanqah Sharif	829
43	Bahawalpur	844
44	Lodhran	860
45	Shah Naal	872
46	Jella Arian	883
47	Basti Maluk	896
48	Lar	915
49	Multan	937
50	Qadirpur Ran	957
51	Khanewal	980
52	Musa Virk	1020
53	Mian Channu	1026
54	Harappa	1082
55	Sahiwal	1102
56	Qadirabad	1114
57	Okara	1134
58	Renala Khurd	1151
59	Akhtarabad	1161
60	Wan Radha Ram	1168
61	Pattoki	1180
62	Bhai Pheru	1204
63	Manga	1220
64	Chung	1239
65	Lahore	1271
66	Ferozewala	1260
67	Kala Shah Kaku	1272
68	Muridke	1287
69	Kamoke	1307
70	Eimanabad Mord	1316
71	Gujranwala	1328
72	Ghakhar	1347
73	Wazirabad	1362
74	Gujrat	1380
75	Lala Musa	1397
76	Kharian	1412
77	Sarai Alamgir	1426
78	Jhelum	1432
79	Dina	1448
80	Sohawa	1473
81	Gujar Khan	1491
82	Mandra	1505
83	Rawat, (Islamabad Capital Territory)	1522
84	Islamabad, Islamabad Highway Junction, Defence Housing Authority, Bahria Town (Islamabad Capital Territory)	1524
85	Adyala Road, Rawalpindi	1540
86	Islamabad, Road junction to Islamabad Main City, Tarnol, Link to New Gandhara Intn'l Airport, Sangjani, CDA New Sectors (Islamabad Capital Territory)	1551
87	John Nicholson's obelisk	1565
88	Taxila	1569
89	Wah Cantt	1579
90	Hasan Abdal	1585
91	Burhan	1595
92	Sanjwal Cantt	1601.012
93	Lawrencepur	1602
94	Hattian	1609
95	Kamra	1611
96	Goundal	1618
97	Haji Shah	1619
98	Attock Khurd	1621

=== Khyber Pakhtunkhwa ===
Number	Location	Km marker no
99	Jehangira	1640
100	Nowshera	1657
101	Pabbi	1678
102	Peshawar	1700

=== FATA ===
Number	Location	Km marker no
103	Jamrud	1718
104	Shagai Fort	1725
105	Torkham	1756

== Electronic Toll & Traffic Management (ETTM) ==
There are 25 Electronic Toll & Traffic Management (ETTM) System Based Toll Plazas of National Highways.

1	Iqbal Shaheed
2	Harro
3	Sangjani
4	Mandra
5	Tarakki
6	Jhelum
7	Chenab
8	Gujranwala
9	Kala Sha kaku
10	Pattoki
11	Okara
12	Harappa
13	Main channu
14	Khanewal
15	Basti Malook
16	Sutlej
17	Ahmedpur Sharqia
18	Khan Bela
19	Iqbalabad
20	Ubauro
21	Rohri
22	Ranipur
23	Kandiaro
24	Moro
25	Saeedabad
26	Sassui
