= NA-171 Rahim Yar Khan-III =

Constituency of the National Assembly of Pakistan

- Constituency for the National Assembly of Pakistan
- Region: Khanpur Tehsil (partly) including Zāhir Pīr town and Rahim Yar Khan Tehsil (partly) of Rahim Yar Khan District
- Electorate: 526,973

Current constituency
- Party: Pakistan People's Party
- Member: Makhdoom Tahir Rashid ud Din
- Created from: NA-194 Rahim Yar Khan-III

NA-171 Rahim Yar Khan-III (این اے-171، رحیم یار خان-3) is a constituency for the National Assembly of Pakistan.

== Election 2002 ==
General elections were held on 10 October 2002. Khusro Bakhtiar of PML-Q won by 70,116 votes.

General election 2002: NA-194 Rahim Yar Khan-III
Party	Candidate	Votes	%	±%
PML(Q)	Makhdoom Khusro Bakhtiar	70,116	51.65	
PPP	Makhdoom Shahab-Ud-Din	59,630	43.92	
MMA	Muhammad Mohsin Rehmani	5,091	3.75	
Independent	Muhammad Sadiq Mazhar	921	0.68	
Turnout		138,905	46.29	
Total valid votes		135,758	97.73	
Rejected ballots		3,147	2.27	
Majority		10,486	7.73	
Registered electors		300,057		

== Election 2008 ==
General elections were held on 18 February 2008. Makhdoom Shahabuddin of PPP won by 59,710 votes.

General election 2008: NA-194 Rahim Yar Khan-III
Party	Candidate	Votes	%	±%
PPP	Makhdoom Shahab-Ud-Din	59,710	43.22	
PML(Q)	Makhdoom Khusro Bakhtiar	42,442	30.72	
PML(F)	Makhdoom Syed Ahmad Mahmood	34,107	24.69	
Others	Others (two candidates)	1,903	1.37	
Turnout		142,568	39.91	
Total valid votes		138,162	96.91	
Rejected ballots		4,406	3.09	
Majority		17,268	12.50	
Registered electors		357,267		
PPP gain from PML(Q)				

== Election 2013 ==
General elections were held on 11 May 2013. Khusro Bakhtiar, an independent, won with 64,272 votes and became the member of National Assembly. He later joined the PML(N).

General election 2013: NA-194 Rahim Yar Khan-III
Party	Candidate	Votes	%	±%
Independent	Makhdoom Khusro Bakhtiar	64,272	39.44	
PPP	Makhdoom Shahab-Ud-Din	49,762	30.54	
PML(N)	Makhdoom Moin Ud Din Ali Hashmi	19,444	11.93	
PTI	Makhdoom Imad Ud Din Hashmi	15,837	9.72	
Others	Others (eleven candidates)	13,631	8.37	
Turnout		169,368	56.83	
Total valid votes		205,008	96.21	
Rejected ballots		6,422	3.79	
Majority		14,510	8.90	
Registered electors		298,013		
Independent gain from PPP				

== Election 2018 ==
General elections were held on 25 July 2018.

General election 2018: NA-177 Rahim Yar Khan-III
Party	Candidate	Votes	%	±%
PTI	Khusro Bakhtiar	100,804	46.50	
PPP	Makhdoom Shahabudin	64,660	29.83	
PML(N)	Makhdoom Moin Ud Din Ali Hashmi	31,848	14.69	
Independent	Nazir Ahmed	4,097	1.89	
Independent	Makhdoom Imad Ud Din Hashmi	3,304	1.52	
TLP	Rukhsana Kousar	3,299	1.52	
Independent	Sardar Muhammad Nawaz Khan	2,710	1.25	
Pakistan Awami Raj	Jamshed Dasti	2,120	0.98	
MMA	Ghulam Kibria	2,091	0.96	
Independent	Syed Ibrar Hussain Shah	1,238	0.57	
Independent	Muhammad Ahsan Abid	309	0.14	
Independent	Makhdoom Tahir Rasheed Ud Din	298	0.14	
Turnout		223,959	54.74	
Total valid votes		216,778	96.79	
Rejected ballots		7,118	3.21	
Majority		36,144	16.67	
Registered electors		409,141		
PTI gain from Independent				

== Election 2024 ==
General elections were held on 8 February 2024. Mumtaz Mustafa won the election with 103,834 votes.

General election 2024: NA-171 Rahim Yar Khan-III
Party	Candidate	Votes	%	±%
PTI	Mumtaz Mustafa (Note: Filed nomination papers as PTI candidate but ECP allowed him to run as an Independent)	103,834	43.96	▼2.54
Independent	Hashim Jawan Bakht	56,028	23.72	
PPP	Makhdoom Tahir Rashid ud Din	49,019	20.75	▼9.08
PML(N)	Makhdoom Moin Ud Din Ali Hashmi	10,645	4.51	▼10.18
Others	Others (seven candidates)	16,671	7.06	
Turnout		243,782	47.23	▼7.51
Total valid votes		236,197	96.89	
Rejected ballots		7,585	3.11	
Majority		47,806	20.24	▲3.57
Registered electors		516,121		

== By-election 2024 ==
A by-election was held on 12 September 2024 due to the death of Mumtaz Mustafa, the previous MNA from this seat. Makhdoom Tahir Rashid ud Din, a candidate of Pakistan People's Party (PPP) and Makhdooms of Mianwali Qureshian’s consensus candidate won the election with 116,429 votes.

By-election 2024: NA-171 Rahim Yar Khan-III
Party	Candidate	Votes	%	±%
PPP	Makhdoom Tahir Rashid ud Din	116,429	64.08	▲43.33
PTI	Rais Hassan Mustafa	58,251	32.06	▼11.90
Others	Others (five candidates)	7,006	3.86	
Turnout		184,887	35.79	▼11.44
Total valid votes		181,686	98.27	
Rejected ballots		3,201	1.73	
Majority		58,178	32.02	▲11.78
Registered electors		526,973		
PPP gain from PTI				

== See also ==
- NA-170 Rahim Yar Khan-II
- NA-172 Rahim Yar Khan-IV
