= Chandrami =

Chandrami چندرامی
- Location within Pakistan
- Coordinates: 28.19°N 70.10°E
- Country: Pakistan
- Province: Punjab
- District: Rahim Yar Khan
- Tehsil: Sadiqabad Tehsil
- Union council: Sadiqabad

Area
  - Total: 5 km^{2} (1.9 sq mi)

Population
  - Total: 1,200
- Time zone: UTC+5 (PST)
- Calling code: 64350

Chandrami (چندرامی) is an ancient village of Sadiqabad Tehsil in the Rahim Yar Khan District of Pakistan. Its name is derived from Hindi language as Chander (Moon) and worship of Ram (God/Bhagwan), i.e. vast shinning moonlight. Its original name was Chand (Moon) and Rani (princesses)چاند رانی by Ameer of Bahawalpur State Nawab Sadiq Muhammad Khan.

It is located northwest of Sadiqabad, the tehsil capital.

== History ==
In ancient times, educated Rajput families were given the title “Molvi” as an educational distinction. Other members of these families were awarded titles such as “Khan Sahib,” which originated from the title “Khan Bahadur” during the British era.

One of the most prominent personalities of this family was Molvi Noor Ahmed Khan (late), who was a landlord and served as a police inspector around 1905. His nephew, Molvi Ghulam Muhammad Khan, was also a respected and humble landlord of Chandrami village.

His elder son, Khan Ghulam Mustafa Khan, Advocate, made significant contributions to the development of the area. Since 1975, he has played a key role in the approval and establishment of major infrastructure projects, including a railway station, water supply systems, paved roads, and electricity.

His elder son, Muhammad Adnan Mustafa Khan, Advocate, has been officially appointed as the “Numberdar” (village head) of Latki and Dagga Ahmed Khan by the Government of Pakistan, continuing the legacy of his forefathers, particularly Molvi Ghulam Muhammad Khan.

Today, members of this family still reside in the area. Some hold high-level positions in Pakistan, such as ministers and secretaries, while others are engaged in businesses abroad.

Chandrami is characterized by ethnic and religious diversity. People from different sects and religions live here. The majority are Muslims, while minorities include Christians and Hindus (particularly from the Thori and Maingwal communities).

Chandrami is located between Sadiqabad and Rahim Yar Khan District.

The people of Chandrami speak a variety of native languages, reflecting their ethnic backgrounds. These include Punjabi (spoken by Muslim communities such as Rajput, Arain, Bhatti, Jutt, Rana, and many Christians), Urdu (commonly used by educated and semi-educated individuals), Saraiki (spoken widely among the Warind caste), Sindhi (in Latki areas), Balochi (spoken by Marhatta or labor communities), Malwari (spoken by Muslim Mahar and Hindu Maingwal and Thori communities), and Pashto (spoken by Pathans).
