= Kot Sabzal =

Town in Rahim Yar Khan, Pakistan

Kot Sabzal کوٹ سبزل
- Town
- Location within Pakistan
- Coordinates: 28.18°N 70.8°E
- Country: Pakistan
- Province: Punjab
- District: Rahim Yar Khan
- Tehsil: Sadiqabad

Population
  - Estimate: 40,000
- Time zone: UTC+5 (PST)
- Calling code: 068

Kot Sabzal (Urdu: کوٹ سبزل, sometimes referred to as Sabzal Kot) is a small town in the Rahim Yar Khan District of Punjab, Pakistan, located near the provincial border of Punjab and Sindh. Accessible via the N-5 National Highway, this town is overshadowed by the presence of nearby larger towns like Ghotki, Jacobabad and Sadiqabad in the vicinity.

== History ==
Kot Sabzal was once ruled by the Pargana, who administered the city under the princely state of Bahawalpur until it was lost to the Mirs of Sindh in 1807. After the British annexed much of the province of Sindh, they restored Kot Sabzal to the Amir of Bahawalpur in 1847 to secure an alliance in the Battle of Multan against the Sikh Empire. After the successful siege and annexation of Multan, a dispute remained over which province would govern Kot Sabzal.

In the early 1830s, Kot Sabzal stood larger and stronger than either Ghotki or Khairpur. Kot Sabzal was surrounded by a thin wall, which was levelled in some areas. Four main bazaars faced each other in the center of the town.

The architecture showed a transition from the mud house to brick houses. As the historian Mohan Lal described in his travelogues, the city had gates that had fallen into disrepair. One wall had a gun pointed towards the Bahawalpur country.

== Economy ==
The town's main source of income is agriculture, with cotton, wheat, and sugar being the most important crops.

== Culture ==
The most common languages are Sindhi, Saraiki, Punjabi and Urdu. The Rais of Kot Sabzal ordered the construction of many buildings like Bhong Mosque.
