= Mian Wali Qureshian =

Town in Punjab, Pakistan

Mian Wali Qureshian میانوالی قریشیاں
- Settlement
- Location within Pakistan
- Coordinates: 28.39°N 70.23°E
- Country: Pakistan
- Province: Punjab
- District: Rahim Yar Khan
- Time zone: UTC+5 (PST)

Mian Wali Qureshian (میانوالی قریشیاں) is a town in Rahim Yar Khan District in Punjab province of Pakistan. It was founded more than 450 years ago by Makhdoom Rohullah Shah I.

== Location ==
Mian Wali Qureshian is located at KLP Road, 33 km away from Rahim Yar Khan city. Its proximity to the N5 National Highway has made it an important pitstop on Pakistan's domestic trade route, for those seeking rolling mango and sugar cane plantations.

== Culture ==
The Saraiki language is mainly spoken here. The local Saraiki culture is influenced by Indus Valley culture as well as Persian and Islamic cultures has a rich history along with its own language and traditions.

Islam is the majority religion of Mian Wali Qureshian. There are shrines of many saints who are revered by people according to the local culture. Sufism has a big impact on the town, the shrine of a famous Sufi Saint Sultan-ul-Tareeqin Sheikh Makhdoom Hameed-ud-Din Shah Hakim Al-Qureshi Asadi Al-Hashmi Suhrawardi is located close to the town in Mau Mubarak. He was Shah Rukn-e-Alam's Ataleeq-e-Awwal, Khalifa-e-Awwal and was married to the daughter of Sheikh Baha-ud-Din Zakariya.

Traditional dress is Ghagra choli (type of lehnga) and Shalwar kameez, which is the national dress of Pakistan. Blue ajrak known as Saraiki Arjak is also an important part of male and female dress. Sindhi ajrak is also worn by people. Saraiki men also like to have moustaches, and little beard.

In Saraiki population, there is Charpai culture, locally known as khatt کھٹ, Khatrra کھٹڑا and Hamacha culture. Charpai and Hamacha means a big heavy wooden bed wooven with ropes made of date-tree leaves or Koondr long leaves, which are kept at Chowks and Deras.Normally people sit on charpai and hamacha in the evening and gossip. There they discuss their daily personal, social or political issues in a friendly environment.

== Socioeconomic conditions ==
Considerable development has taken place over the past few decades and many basis facilities are provided in Mian Wali Qureshian. These facilities include sewerage systems, water supply, electricity producers, an MEPCO subdivisional office and a Union Council office. Along with this, the town has experienced technological improvement with sustainable mobile/internet networks and Internet cafes. Commercial activity due to its closeness to the N5 highway has also brought banks to town, including a Habib Bank Limited branch.

One government-run Rural Health Centre (RHC) is working to provide health facilities to the people of Mian Wali Qureshian. Many private hospitals and clinics also provide healthcare. Mianwali Qureshian has two government high schools for boys and girls and many smaller private schools provide education. The majority of students travel to Rahimyar Khan for further education.

Poverty and unemployment are rampant with more than 60% of the population living below the poverty line. Literacy rates are below the Rahimyar Khan district average of 45 percent. Clean drinking water has been another unresolved issue. A total of 77% water samples collected in the region were found with arsenic contamination, due to which 50% people were found with arsencosis symptoms and 60% of their earnings were being spent on hospitalisation. Hepatitis-C is widespread amongst the population and has not been combatted effectively. The law and order authorities are non-existent due to the prevalence of feudal lords in and around the town.

== Politics and government ==
Mian Wali Qureshian is located in the NA-177 Rahim Yar Khan-III National Assembly constituency. It is home to many prominent national and provincial political personalities including ex-Federal Minister Makhdoom Shahabuddin, ex-Provincial Senior Minister Makhdoom Altaf Ahmed, current Federal Minister Makhdoom Khusro Bakhtiar and Punjab Finance Minister Hashim Jawan Bakht among others. The town is seen to be dominated by feudal landowners and industrialists especially from the prominent Makhdoom family, who founded the town 450 years ago. The current MNA of this constituency is Makhdoom Khusru Bakhtiar and the current MPA is his brother, Hashim Jawan Bakht.
