= Chak 151 P =

Chak No 158/P
- Location within Pakistan
- Coordinates: 28.15°N 70.12°E
- Country: Pakistan
- Province: Punjab
- District: Rahim Yar Khan District
- Tehsil: Sadiqabad Tehsil
- Union council: Sadiqabad
- Time zone: UTC+5 (PST)

Chak/village 151/P is a small area in Sadiqabad, Rahim Yar Khan District, Punjab, Pakistan. Its postal code is 64351.
