= Ahmed Pur Lamma =

Pakistani town

Coordinates: 28.517°N 70.05°E

Ahmad Pur Lamma is a town in Rahim Yar Khan District, Punjab, Pakistan, located a 13 kilometers from Sadiqabad.
