= Sadiqabad boat sinking =

2022 boat sinking

Baraati boat sinking in Indus River
- Date: 18 July 2022
- Time: 10:00 AM
- Location: Near Machka, Sadiqabad Tehsil Rahim Yar Khan District, Punjab, Pakistan
- Cause: Overcrowding
- Deaths: 50
- Missing: 24

Sadiqabad boat sinking took place on 18 July 2022 in Sadiqabad tehsil, Rahim Yar Khan district of Punjab, Pakistan. A Baraati boat sank in the Indus River near Machchka. The death toll reached 50, including women and children, while 24 other people were unaccounted for. Around 75 people were aboard the boat. According to the district administration, the accident occurred due to overcrowding.

According to the Deputy Commissioner, it was part of a wedding procession that included two boats, carrying more than 150 people. 35 passengers were rescued by the second boat. Several people were brought to safety by divers.

== Rescue operation ==
Initial rescue operations, involving Rescue 1122 divers and local villagers, brought ashore approximately 80 to 90 survivors. Nearly all recovered bodies—initially reported as around 20—were women and children. District authorities confirmed the identity of 19 women and two children among the deceased, though figures varied slightly between sources. By 22 July, days after the incident, the death toll had risen to 33 following the recovery of additional bodies, with around 17 individuals still missing at that time.

Machchka is an enclave of Punjab within Sindh, requiring two hours for rescue personnel to reach the site. According to the spokesperson of Rescue Punjab, the water rescue operation involved 39 divers. Two days later Pakistan army SSG commandos joined the operation. According to local administration, as many as 50 deaths were ultimately confirmed, with 24 people remaining unaccounted for.
