= Bhong =

Town in Punjab, Pakistan

Coordinates: 28°25′N 69°55′E

Bhong بھونگ
- Town
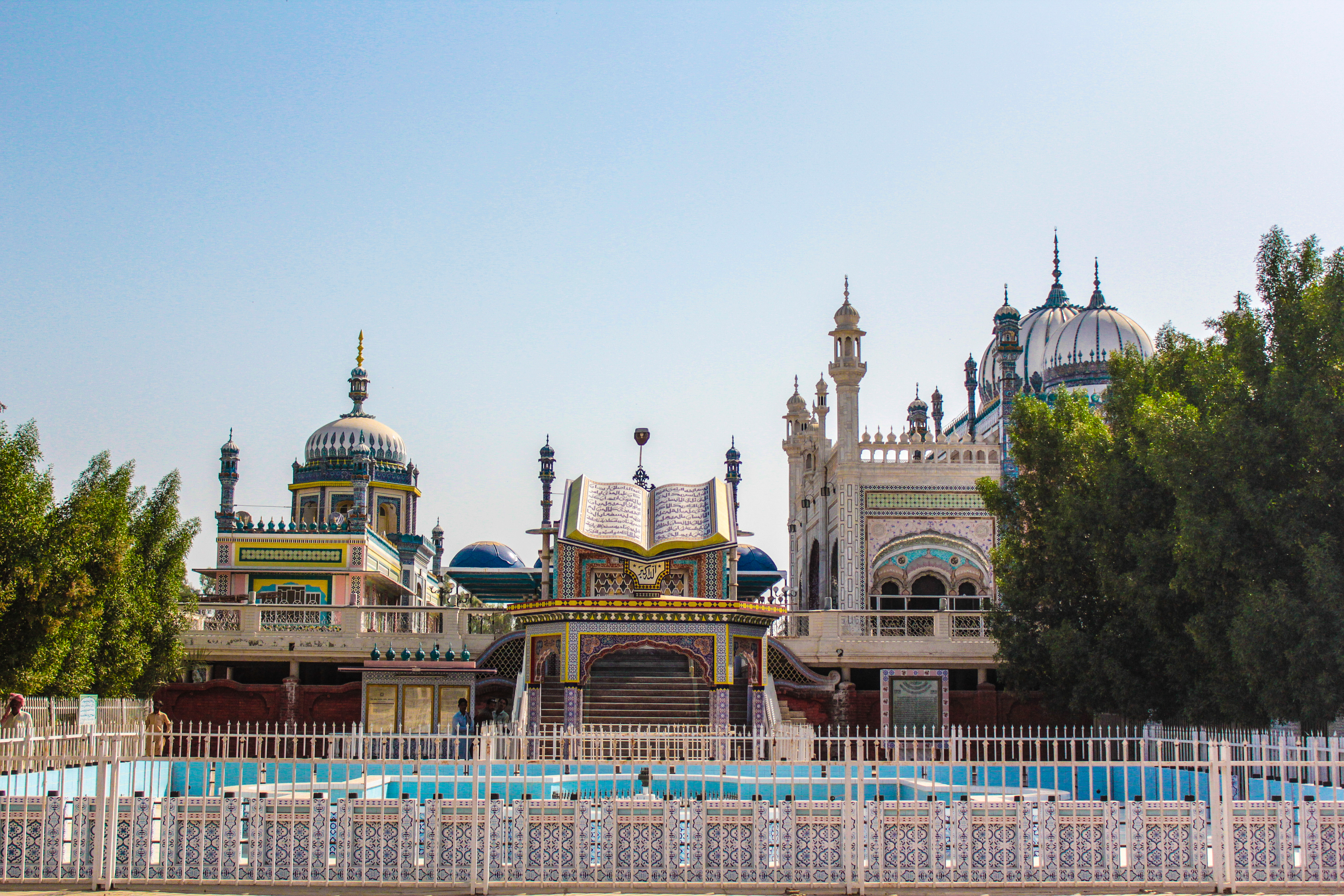
- Bhong Mosque won the Aga Khan Award for Architecture in 1986.

- Location within Pakistan
- Country: Pakistan
- Province: Punjab
- District: Rahim Yar Khan
- Tehsil: Sadiqabad

Area
  - Total: 12 km^{2} (4.6 sq mi)
- Elevation: 1 m (3.3 ft)

Population (1998)
  - Total: 5,638
- Time zone: UTC+5 (PST)

Bhong (Urdu, and Punjabi: بھونگ) is a small town in Sadiqabad Tehsil of Rahim Yar Khan District in the Punjab province of Pakistan. It is a Union Council of Sadiqabad tehsil (Urdu for subdistrict) and is located 200 kilometres away from Bhawalpur at 28° 25' 0" North, 69° 55' 0" East.

== See also ==
- 2021 Bhong temple attack
