= Basti Haji Gul Muhammad =

Coordinates: 28°37′N 70°36′E

- Village
- Location within Pakistan
- Country: Pakistan
- Province: Punjab
- District: Rahim Yar Khan
- Time zone: UTC+5 (PST)

Basti Haji Gul Muhammad is a populated place in of Rahim Yar Khan District, in Punjab province of Pakistan. It is located near Bhong, and is mainly inhabited by the members of the Kosh clan.
