= Muhammad Nawaz Sharif University of Engineering & Technology =

Public university in Multan, Punjab, Pakistan

Coordinates: 30.1647°N 71.4956°E

Muhammad Nawaz Sharif University of Engineering and Technology
- جامعہ محمد نواز شریف ہندسیہ و تکنیکیہ
- Motto: فکر ، ہنر ، حق و اجالا
- Motto in English: Mind, Skill, Truth and Light
- Type: Public
- Established: 2012
- Affiliations: Higher Education Commission (Pakistan); Pakistan Engineering Council; National Technology Council (Pakistan)
- Chancellor: Governor of the Punjab
- Vice-Chancellor: Prof. Dr. Tauseef Aized
- Students: 1684
- Location: Multan, Punjab, Pakistan
- Nickname: MNSUET
- Website: mnsuet.edu.pk

The Muhammad Nawaz Sharif University of Engineering and Technology (MNSUET) (Urdu: جامعہ محمد نواز شریف ہندسیہ و تکنیکیہ) is a public university located in Multan, Punjab, Pakistan. It was established in 2012 on the initiative of Chief Minister Punjab Mian Muhammad Shahbaz Sharif. The Act of Muhammad Nawaz Sharif University of Engineering and Technology Multan was approved in 2014. The university is named after Nawaz Sharif.

== Administration ==
The university has following administrative offices:

=== Office of the Vice Chancellor ===
Prof. Dr. Tauseef Aized joined Muhammad Nawaz Sharif University of Engineering & Technology, Multan as Vice Chancellor on September 10, 2025. Engr. Kamran Umer is working as PS to the Vice Chancellor.

=== Office of the Registrar ===
Engr. Dr. Asim Umer, Chairman ChE Department is working as Registrar of the University.

=== Office of the Treasurer ===
Dr. Asifa Maqbool (Lecturer, Management Sciences Department) is working as Additional Treasurer of MNS UET on additional charge basis.

=== Office of the Controller of the Examinations ===
Engr. Dr. Ayyaz Ahmad, Associate Professor, ChE Department is working as Controller of the Examinations of the University.

== Departments ==
The university consists of the following departments:

- Chemical Engineering and Technology Department
- Electrical Engineering and Technology Department
- Mechanical Engineering and Technology Department
- Civil Engineering and Technology Department
- Computer Science Department
- Basic Sciences and Humanities Department
- Management Sciences Department

== Programs ==
The university offers the following degree programs:

=== Undergraduate programs ===
- BSc Chemical Engineering
- BSc Electrical Engineering
- BSc Mechanical Engineering Technology
- BSc Civil Engineering Technology
- BSc Electrical Engineering Technology
- BS Computer Science
- BS Physics
- BS Chemistry
- BS Mathematics
- Bachelor of Business Administration (BBA)
- B.Sc. Architectural Engineering Technology

=== Postgraduate programs ===
- MSc Chemical Engineering
- MSc Electrical Engineering
- Ph.D. Chemical Engineering

== Campus ==
The current campus of the university is located in the premises of Government College of Technology (GCT), Qasimpur Colony, Near BCG Chowk, Bahawalpur Road, Multan. A piece of land has been purchased by Government of the Punjab for the construction of new campus is in process. Almost 70% of the construction in Phase-1 is completed. It consists of 210 acres and is situated near town Lar (لاڑ) on the same Bahawalpur Road (4.25 kilometers off the main highway and to the east, near Chak 14/Faiz) N-5 National Highway, 21 kilometers away from the current campus.

== Former Vice Chancellors ==
NAME	OFFICE	FROM	TO
Lt. Gen. (Rtd) Muhammad Akram Khan	Vice Chancellor (Addl. Charge)	08.09.2012	15.10.2014
Engr. Prof. Dr. Zubair Ahmad Khan	Vice Chancellor (Addl. Charge)	16.10.2014	17.12.2014
Engr. Prof. Dr Fazal Ahmad Khalid	Vice Chancellor (Addl. Charge)	18.12.2014	27.12.2016
Prof. Dr. Muhammad Zubair	Vice Chancellor (Provisional Basis)	28.12.2016	23.11.2017
Engr. Prof. Dr. Aamir Ijaz	Vice Chancellor	24.11.2017	23.11.2021
Engr. Prof. Dr. Syed Mansoor Sarwar	Vice Chancellor (Addl. Charge)	29.12.2021	10.09.2022
Prof. Dr. Muhammad Kamran	Vice Chancellor	10.09.2022	01.10.2025

== IT Infrastructure and Labs ==
The university uses BoltFlare Enterprise Hosting to ensure the smooth running of all its official websites and Microsoft 365 for emails, making communication with students, Faculty and staff efficient and secure. State of the Art Computer, Engineering and Technology Labs are established for students. Dr. Samina Naz, Assistant Professor has been assigned the additional duties of Incharge, Computer Science Department. Before Her, Dr. Kashif Ali was the incharge of Computer Science Department. Digital presence and strategic online development of the university are managed by SMMPro. Student software solutions and related digital systems are developed with the assistance of Zatiq Solutions.

== See also ==
- List of universities in Pakistan
- List of engineering universities and colleges in Pakistan
