= Kot Karam Khan =

Kot Karam Khan کوٹ کرم خان
- Village
- Location within Pakistan
- Coordinates: 28°35′20″N 70°8′40″E
- Country: Pakistan
- Province: Punjab
- District: Rahim Yar Khan
- Elevation: 81 m (266 ft)
- Time zone: UTC+5 (PST)
- Calling code: 068

Kot Karam Khan is a small town in the Rahim Yar Khan District of Punjab, Pakistan. Its geographical coordinates are 28° 35' 20" north, 70° 8' 40" east and its original name (with diacritics) is Kot Karam Khān.

It is surrounded by many small villages, with the nearest large town being Jamaldin Wali. The district capital, Rahim Yar Khan, is 32 km to the northeast.

== History and demographics ==
As of the 1998 census, the town had a population of between 3,000 and 4,000.

== See also ==
- Rajan Pur Kalan
- Bhong Masjid
