= Krishna Mandir =

Krishna Mandir or Krishna Temple may refer to these temples dedicated to the Hindu god Krishna:

- Krishna Janmasthan Temple Complex, Hindu temple in Mathura, Uttar Pradesh, India; considered to be the birthplace of Krishna
- Krishna Mandir, Barohiya, Hindu temple in Uttar Pradesh, India
- Krishna Temple, Islamabad, Hindu temple in Pakistan
- Krishna Mandir, Lahore, Hindu temple in Punjab, Pakistan
- Krishna Mandir, Patan, Hindu temple in Patan, Nepal
- Krishna Temple, Rawalpindi, Hindu temple in Punjab, Pakistan
- Krishna Temple, Sadiqabad, Hindu temple in Punjab, Pakistan
