= Kharor and Machka =

Kharor-Machka کھروڑ-ماچھکہ
- Enclaves of Punjab
- Interactive map of Kharor-Machka
- Coordinates: 28.2686253°N 69.5949143°E
- Country: Pakistan
- Province: Punjab
- District: Rahim Yar Khan
- Tehsil: Sadiqabad
- Union councils: 2
- Time zone: UTC+5 (PST)

Kharor and Machka are two union councils of Sadiqabad Tehsil in Rahim Yar Khan District, Punjab, Pakistan. Covering an area of 63,611 acres (257.42 km^{2}), they form two subnational enclaves of Punjab province within Sindh, being surrounded by Kashmore, and Ghotki districts of Sindh on all sides as well as being non-contiguous to each other. The two enclaves have a population of 100,000 as of 2024, and are part of NA-174 Rahim Yar Khan-VI constituency of National Assembly of Pakistan and PP-267 Rahim Yar Khan-XIII constituency of Punjab Assembly. Machka is 17 km away from the last Punjab police station at Daudwala on Sadiqabad-Kashmore highway.

Kharor and Machka are part of riverine area called Katcha, which is home to criminal gangs known as Katcha dacoits. In 2022, about 50 people drowned in the Indus River when a boat carrying wedding party between Kharor and Machka capsized. A police station and various check posts are located in the enclaves.
