= Rais (disambiguation) =

Rais is a Muslim title.

Rais may also refer to:

== People ==
=== Given name ===
- Saint Rais (died 303), Christian saint
- Rais, founder of the Raisani, a Pakistani tribe
- Rais Abin (1926–2021), Indonesian military officer and diplomat
- Rais Ahmadzai (born 1984), Afghan cricketer
- Rais Ibrahim Khalil Ahmed (born 1963), Pakistani politician
- Rais Muhammad Mehboob Ahmed (born 1964), Pakistani politician
- Rais Nabeel Ahmad, Pakistani politician
- Rais Amrohvi (1914–1988), Pakistani Urdu poet
- Rais Ansari (born 1951), Indian Urdu poet
- Rais Bhuiyan (born 1973), Bangladeshi American hate crime victim who forgave his shooter
- Rais-Ali Delvari (1882–1915), Iranian military leader
- Rais Galimov (born 1946), Soviet sailor
- Rais Hamidu (1773–1815), Algerian corsair
- Rais Muhammad Iqbal (born 1954), Pakistani politician
- Rais Khan (1939–2017), Indian sitar player
- Raïs M'Bolhi (born 1986), Algerian footballer
- Rais al-Mojahedin (died 1918), Iranian revolutionary
- Rais Anis Sabri (born 1993), Indian classical musician
- Rais Shaikh (born 1974), Indian politician
- Rais Sitdikov (born 1988), Russian footballer
- Rais Yasin (born 1984), Malaysian politician
- Rais Yatim (born 1942), Information, Communications, and Culture Minister of Malaysia

=== Surname ===
- Amber Pierce (born 1981), née Rais, American professional cyclist
- Amien Rais (born 1944), Indonesian politician
- Gilles de Rais (1405–1440), companion-in-arms of Joan of Arc in her fight against the English and serial killer of children
- Julia Rais (born 1971), Malaysian actress and princess
- Karel Václav Rais (1859–1926), Czech novelist
- Muhammad Rais, Indonesian terrorist
- Salah Rais (1488–1568), Turkish privateer and Ottoman Empire admiral

== Places ==
- Rais, Iran, a village in Kermanshah Province
- Rais, South Khorasan, a village in South Khorasan Province, Iran
- Rais, a village in Algeria, site of the Rais massacre of 1997

== RAIS ==
- Redundant Array of Inexpensive Servers, multiple computers in a server farm

== See also ==
- Raees (disambiguation)
- Reis (disambiguation)
- Rai (disambiguation)
