= Kanji Ram =

Pakistani politician

Member of the Provincial Assembly of the Punjab
- In office June 2013 – 31 May 2018
- Constituency: Reserved seat for minorities

Personal details
- Born: 1 January 1971 (age 55) Sadiqabad, Punjab, Pakistan
- Party: Pakistan Muslim League (N)

Kanji Ram is a Pakistani politician who was a Member of the Provincial Assembly of the Punjab, from June 2013 to May 2018.

== Early life ==
He was born on 1 January 1971 in Sadiqabad, Punjab, Pakistan into a Punjabi Hindu family.

== Political career ==
He was elected to the Provincial Assembly of the Punjab as a candidate of Pakistan Muslim League (N) on reserved seat for minorities in the 2013 Pakistani general election.

In 2025, he was nominated as a member from the Hindu minority to the Human Rights and Minorities Affairs Department.
