= Teunga =

- Village
- Location in Uttar Pradesh, India Teunga (India)
- Coordinates: 26.102°N 82.871°E
- Country: India
- State: Uttar Pradesh
- District: Azamgarh
- Established: unknown
- Founder: unknown

Area
  - Total: 1.6026 km^{2} (0.6188 sq mi)
- Elevation: 85 m (279 ft)

Population
  - Total: 4,000
  - Density: 400.75/km^{2} (1,037.9/sq mi)

Languages
  - Official: Hindi Urdu (Dehati)
- Time zone: UTC+05:30 (IST)
- PIN: 276304
- Area code: 05460
- Website: teunga.blogspot.com

Teunga is a village in Phulpur tehsil in Azamgarh district of Uttar Pradesh state, India. It comes under Teunga Panchayath. It belongs to Azamgarh division. It is located 36 km west from district headquarters Azamgarh, 2 km from Phulpur and 243 km from state capital Lucknow.

The Teunga pin code is 276304 and postal head office is Phoolpur.

Teunga is surrounded by Ahiraula to the (north), Pawai and Shahganj to the west, and Tahbarpur to the east.

Mau, Azamgarh, Jaunpur, Tanda are nearby cities to Teunga.

Teunga is in the border of the Azamgarh district and Jaunpur district. Shahganj in Jaunpur district is west of this village.

== Demographics of Teunga ==
Hindi and Urdu are the local languages.

== How To Reach Teunga ==
By Rail

Khorason Road, and Didarganj Road are the very nearby railway stations to Teunga. Azamgarh is also a major railway station 33 km away.

== Nearby railway stations ==
Khorason Road Railway Station (1 km away)

Didarganj Road Railway Station (7 km away)

Sarai Mir Railway Station (10 km away)

Sanjarpur Railway Station (15 km away)

== Nearby airports ==
Varanasi Airport (81 km away)

Gorakhpur Airport (102 km away)

Bamrauli Airport (151 km away)

Amausi Airport (236 km away)

== Nearby districts ==
Azamgarh (34 km away)

Jaunpur (49 km away)

Ambedkar Nagar (55 km away)

Mau (80 km away)

== Nearby tourist places ==
Jaunpur (50 km away)

Basti (90 km away)

Sarnath (91 km away)

Varanasi (98 km away)

Gorakhpur (99 km away)

== Nearby tehsils ==
Phulpur (2 km away)

Ahiraula (10 km away)

Pawai (15 km away)

Shahganj (21 km away)

== Nearby cities ==
Azamgarh (34 km away)

Jaunpur (49 km away)

Ambedkar Nagar (55 km away)

Mau (80 km away)
