= Riyasat =

Riyasat may refer to:

- Princely state, Indian vassal states under the British Raj
- Riyasat (Islam), an organization in the Islamic communities in the Balkans
- Riyasat (1955 film), an Indian Hindi film
- Riyasat (film), a 2014 Indian Hindi-language action film
- Riyasat (TV series), a 2005 Pakistani drama

== See also ==
- Rais (disambiguation)
- Raees (disambiguation)
- Reis (disambiguation)
