= Firoza, Rahim Yar Khan =

Feroza فیروزہ
- Town
- Location within Pakistan
- Coordinates: 28°45′0″N 70°49′0″E
- Country: Pakistan

Government
  - Governing body: Union Council
- Highest elevation: 97.5 m (320 ft)
- Lowest elevation: 88.3 m (290 ft)

Population (2017 Census)
  - Total: 11,107
- Time zone: UTC+5 (PST)
- Postcode: 64070
- Area code: 068

Feroza, or Firoza, is a town in Rahim Yar Khan in the center of Khanpur and Liaqatpur tehsils of Rahim Yar Khan, Punjab, Pakistan.

== History ==
The town developed around a railway station and grew significantly after the independence of Pakistan in 1947. The name Firoza is generally believed to derive from the Persian word “firuzeh,” meaning “turquoise,” a gemstone associated with prosperity, protection, and good fortune, reflecting cultural influences and linguistic exchanges in the Punjab region. Local traditions also attribute the name to a woman said to have been an early resident during the British period, though this account remains unverified. Another local story links the name to a stone called ‘Firoza’ found in the area, though there is no clear evidence to support this.

== Geography ==
Khanpur lies about 29.5 km to the southwest of Feroza, while Liaquatpur is approximately 25.3 km to the northeast, PakkaLaran is situated to the northwest and the Cholistan is in East.

== People and culture ==
The population of Feroza consists mainly of two groups: the native " Riasti" inhabitants of the region and families who migrated from different parts of Indian subcontinent after 1947. The mix shaped a culture reflecting social cohesion and diversity. Traditional attire for men includes shalwar-kameez, while older generations may also wear dhoti kurta; young people increasingly wear Western clothing. Women commonly wear a shalwar kameez with a dupatta and, in some cases, observe veiling practices, reflecting prevailing Islamic cultural norms. Turbans are also worn, particularly in rural areas.

=== Major tribes ===
The main tribes of the town are the Rais, Chachar, Jam, Lar, Jhargi, Warraich, Syed, Bukhari, Chauhan, Chaudhry, Qureshi, Chandia Baloch, Alvi, Thaheem, Hashmi, Malik, Mughal, Raja, Kharal, Dushti Baloch, Mazari Unner, Jamali Baloch, Mirza, Gujjar, Dasti Baloch, Khawaja, Mian, Sheikh, Bohors, Mahar, Rahmani, Bhatti, Baloch, Jat, Bhullar, Khosa Baloch, Khushk Baloch, Abbasi, Malik, Jatoi Baloch, Ansari, Oad, Rajput, Mirani, Raos, Khokhar, Patafi, Palals, Kewad, Dhareja, Jat Warah, Korai Baloch, Panwar, Bhutta, and Soomro. Most of the tribes resident in the town have belonged to this region for centuries. Still, a number of migrant families also are living here. These migrant families mostly belong to the Indian subcontinent.

== Religion ==
The town has majority of Muslim sects. Hindus and Christians are in minority amounting to less than 2% of total population. In this region, minorities are usually treated with equal rights as the minorities are living with majority of Muslims since centuries.

== Education ==
The literacy rate is quite low because of the non-availability of resources. There is only one private college and two higher secondary schools. There are government-run secondary schools within the town, as well as private schools. Still, many people are in well-known departments because of their own struggles.

One of the oldest educational institutions of Firoza is Govt. Higher Secondary School Firoza (for boys). It was built in 1926 by the British Government as a primary school. After that, it was given the designation of secondary school in 1939. After Pakistan came into being this school started progressing at a pace. So, the government announced it as high secondary school in 1952. From 1952 to 1988 it remained a high school. Then, with the efforts of many notable people, it was given the designation of Higher Secondary School. Now, it is working as a higher secondary school. The school has experienced ups and downs, but it has given many notable people to the nation. The school is now suffering from problems like inadequate building where the number of students is increasing day by day.

The first private school was Oxford Public Girls High school started on 1 January 1992. Another educational institute is Tamir-E-Millat Model Public High School Firoza which was established by Rana Mohammad Hussain in 2000.

There are other private institutions as well. But all of the above-mentioned schools are not up to the standard regarding facilities. Children here are unable to get quality education. However, the region has produced some who have excelled academically.

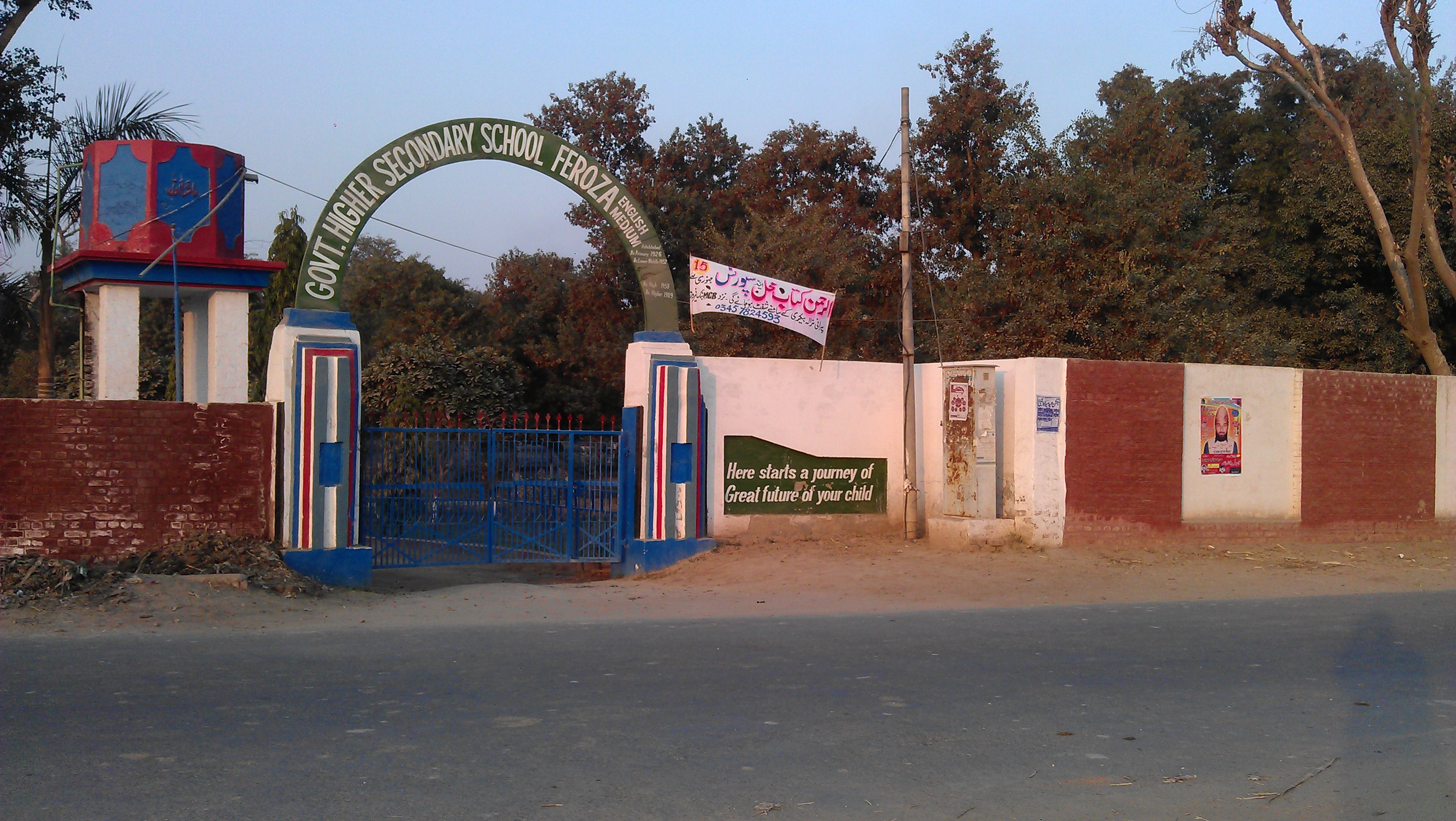
Govt higher Secondary School Firoza

== Religious Schools ==
Many religious institutes called madrasas are working here. The oldest Masjid in Firoza is Jamia Masjid Fareedi known as Saem Wali Masjid سیم والی مسجد which was built by Khawaja Ghulam Fareed in 1890s, on his way to Rohi (Cholistan. Later on, other religious schools for basic Islamic education were established in different corners of the town namely, Madni Masjid، Madrsa Madintul Aloom Madarsat-ul-banat, Faizan-e-Madina, Madrsa Jamia tu Imam Raza etc. Different school of thoughts are working according to their ideologies. Number of Hafiz (Qur'an) are increasing by the work of these Islamic institutes.

== Climate ==
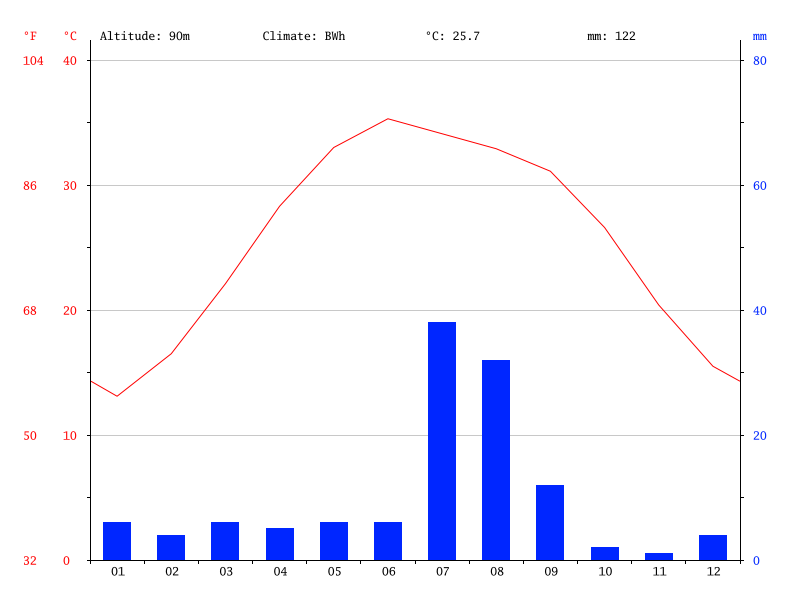
Average Annual Rainfall in Firoza

Firoza is considered to have a desert climate. In Firoza, there is virtually no rainfall during the year. This location is classified as BWh by Köppen and Geiger. The average temperature in Firoza is 25.7 °C. The rainfall here averages 122 mm. The least amount of rainfall occurs in November. The average in this month is 1 mm. Most of the precipitation here falls in July, averaging 38 mm. The temperatures are highest on average in June, at around 35.3 °C. January is the coldest month, with temperatures averaging 13.1 °C. The variation in the precipitation between the driest and wettest months is 37 mm. Throughout the year, temperatures vary by 22.2 °C.

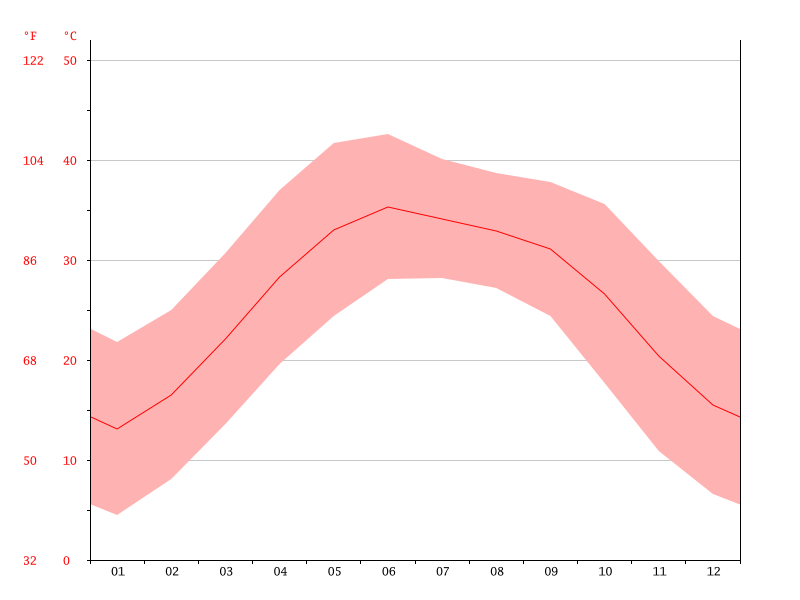
Annual Temperature Graph of Firoza

== Industry and commerce ==
Most of the people are directly or indirectly related to agriculture. This area is renowned for cotton and mango crops. Rest of them are related to trade and government employment. Trade is the fastest-growing occupation/profession here because people from the nearby villages are investing here. Specially, people are shifting from villages of Cholistan Desert to Firoza.

Souvenirs are produced in the city, some of which include:

- Flassi - 4 ft by 7 ft, made of camel hair and cotton yarn; it is used for wall hanging, as a decoration piece and a carpet.
- Gindi or Rilli - Made of small pieces of many colors of cotton cloth and needlework; they can be used as wall hangings, bed covers, carpets and blankets.
- Changaries - Like big plaques, these are made of palm leaves in different bright colors with beautiful patterns and geometric designs. These are used for keeping the 'chapattis' and also as a wall decoration.
- Khalti - Like a purse embroidered on top with multicolored threads.
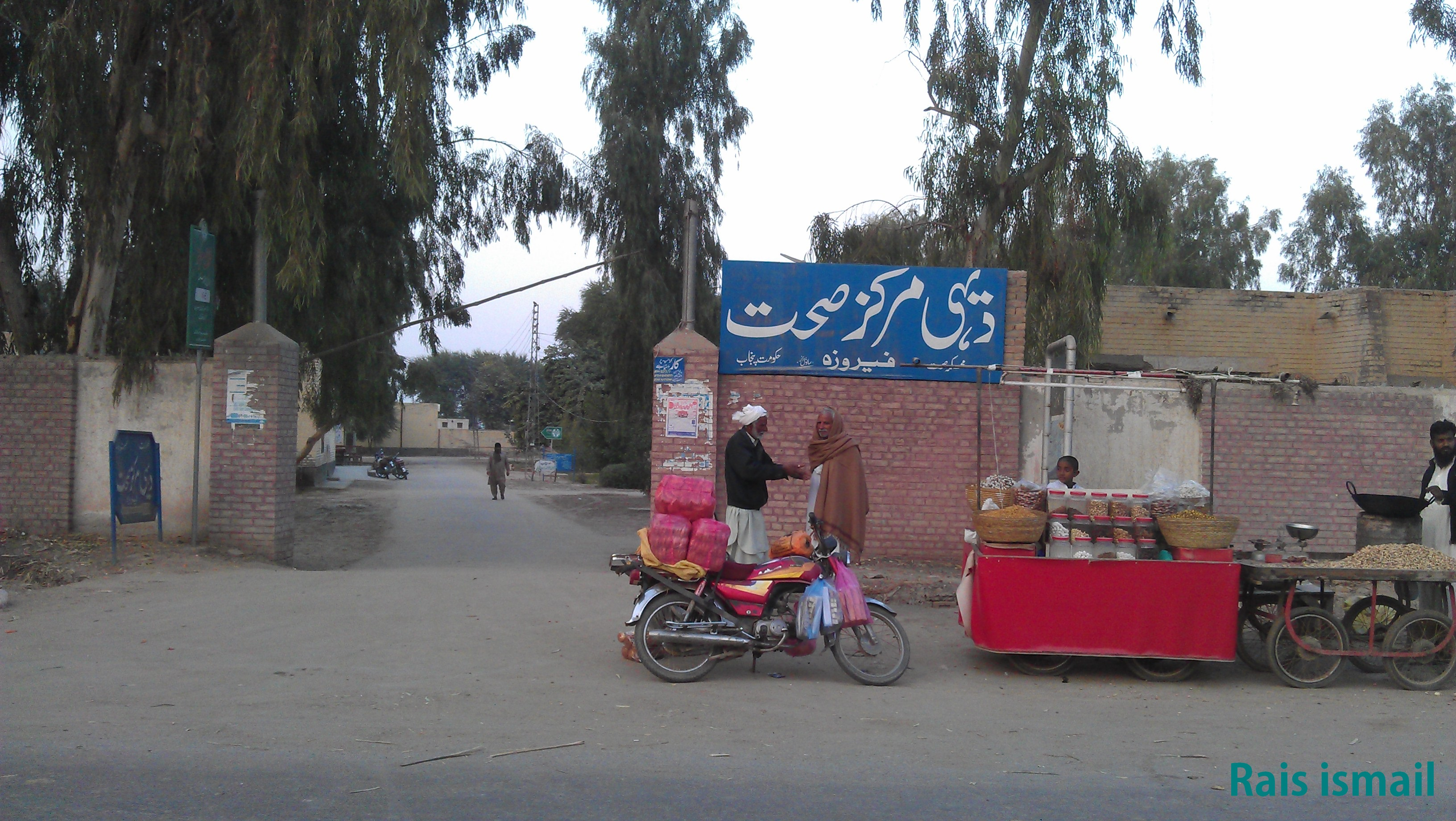
- Civil Hospital Firoza
  Artwork - An attractive type of embroidery done on dupatta, kurta and chaddar, etc.

== Health ==
The city has only one government run hospital. The hospital lacks basic life-saving medicines and facilities. To facilitate the people of the town and suburbs of the town few private hospitals are working. People here are lacking proper health facilities. It is not only a dilemma of this city, it is common to the whole region. Basic health necessities are rare in the town. Drinking water of the town is unhygienic, having plentiful salt making it undrinkable. The only source of drinking water is handful water pumps on the brink of a canal just outside the town in South East direction.

== Sports ==
Popular sports are cricket, kabaddi, kushti, and football. Some of the other local games are gulli danda, ghoribella, bandar killa, kut mar, goch no teal, and andress press.

== Tomb ==
It is said that there was an attack by non-Muslims that killed 22 Hafiz (Qur'an) and their teacher, Baba Bavi. Their tombs are located in the main graveyard of town. The main graveyard is in north of town. People here go to attend the religious activities.

== See also ==
- Derawar Fort
- Saraiki people
- Rahim Yar Khan
