= Raees =

Raees may refer to:

- Rais, a title used by the rulers of Arab states in the Middle East and in South Asia
- Raees (1976 film), an Indian Hindi-language drama film
- Raees (2017 film), an Indian Hindi-language action film
  - Raees (soundtrack), a soundtrack album from the film
- Rumman Raees (born 1991), Pakistani cricketer
- Abdur Raees (1931-1988), Bangladeshi politician

== See also ==
- Rais (disambiguation)
- Riyasat (disambiguation)
