= Shahpur Jehanian =

Pakistani town

Coordinates: 26.5738°N 67.9738°E

Shahpur Jehanian, also Shahpur Jahania, is a town in Sindh, Pakistan between Daulatpur and Moro on the main N-5 National Highway. It is also the headquarters of a union council of the same name. Its population is approximately 40,000.

The town was severely impacted, leaving thousands struggling to survive in the aftermath of the unprecedented floods that devastated the area in 2022.
