= Makhdoom Shahabuddin =

Pakistani minister and National Assembly member

Makhdoom Shahabuddin مخدوم شہاب الدین شاہ
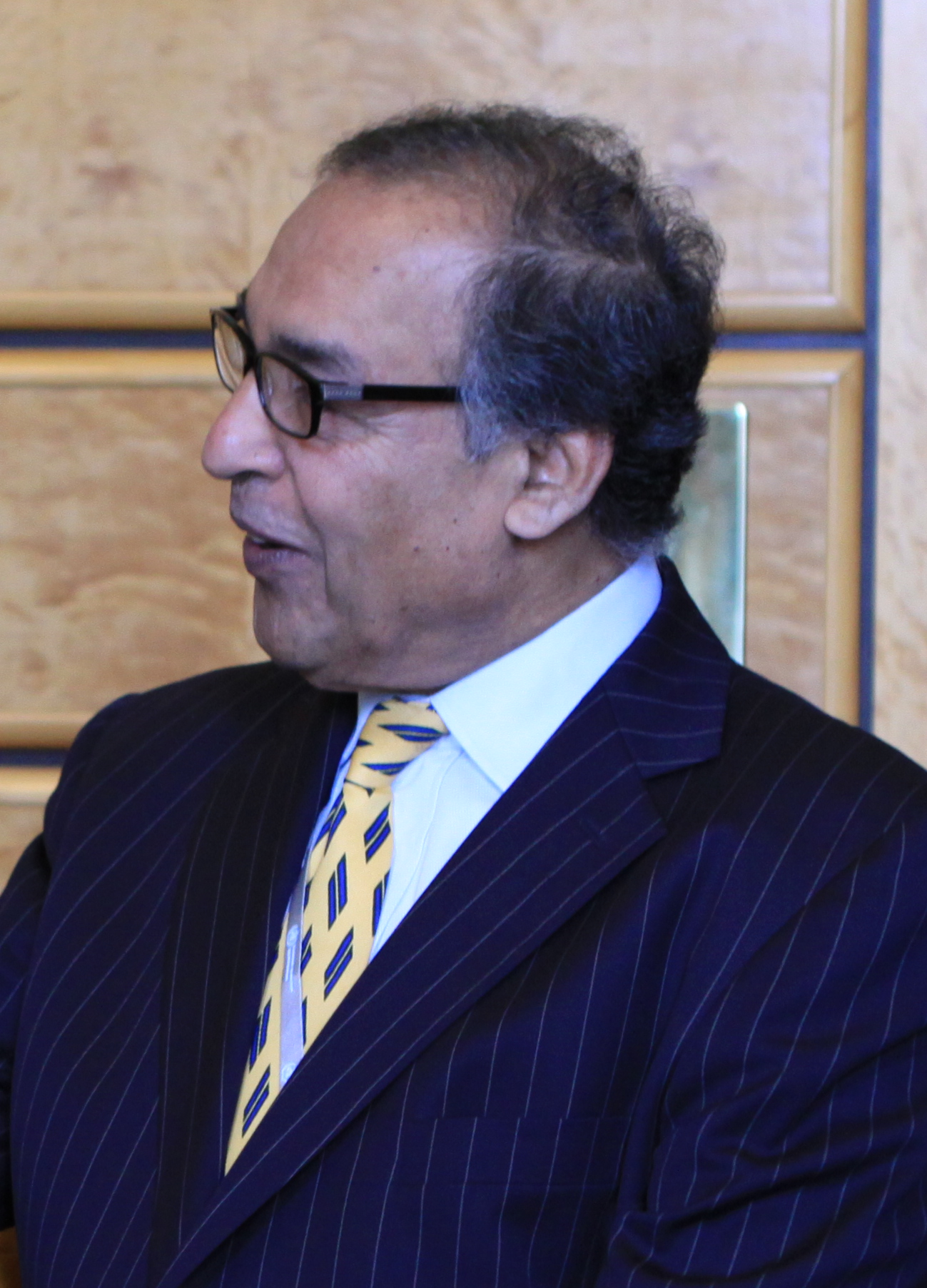
- Shahabuddin in 2019

Federal Minister of Pakistan for Textiles
- In office 2008–2013
- President: Asif Ali Zardari

Minister of Finance
- In office 1993–1996

President of Pakistan Peoples Party South Punjab
- In office unknown – 3 November 2016

Member of the National Assembly of Pakistan
- In office 1990–1993, 1993–1996, 2008-2013

Personal details
- Born: 7 April 1947 (age 79) Rahim Yar Khan, Punjab, British India (now Pakistan)
- Other political affiliations: Pakistan Peoples Party
- Children: Makhdoom Tahir Rashid ud Din
- Education: Forman Christian College; Sadiq Public School

Makhdoom Shahabuddin Shah (Urdu مخدوم شہاب الدین شاہ; born 7 April 1947) is a Pakistani politician and was a member of the National Assembly of Pakistan (February 2008 to May 2013) who has held federal ministerial portfolios for finance, health and textiles. He has been elected as MNA from constituency NA-194 three times in the 1990, 1993 and 2008 Pakistani general elections.

He is from Mian Wali Qureshian, Rahim Yar Khan District, a town in the Punjab, Pakistan of southern Punjab and his political affiliation is with the Pakistan Peoples Party (PPP).

== Political career ==
Makhdoom Shahabudin has been involved with the Pakistan Peoples Party (PPP) since the Zulfikar Ali Bhutto regime in the 1970s, when his father Makhdoom Hameed-ud-Din was amongst the party's founding members and later served as federal minister under Bhutto. Shahabuddin has been one of the senior-most members in People's Party, having served in its central executive committee and as regional president for the party in South Punjab. He was considered especially close to the party's former leader, Benazir Bhutto. And after her assassination in 2008, he was recommended as the candidate for Prime Minister of Pakistan in the 2008 Pakistan elections. But Yousaf Raza Gillani was preferred by Mrs Bhutto's widower and eventual President Asif Ali Zardari.

On 19 June 2012, in the aftermath of Yousaf Raza Gilani's conviction and disqualification by the Pakistan Supreme Court on contempt of court charges, Shahabuddin was appointed by the PPP as its candidate for the office of Prime Minister of Pakistan but the nomination was cancelled after a warrant for his arrest was issued by the ANF under suspicious circumstances upon the very day he was nominated.

He served as Federal Minister of Pakistan of Textiles under the Gilani government.

He is the descendant and successor (sajjada-nasheen) of a famous Sufi saint, Sheikh Makhdoom Hameed-ud-Din Shah Hakim Al-Hashmi Suhrawardi and his mausoloem in Mao Mubarak, Rahimyar Khan. He is also closely related to Federal Minister Khusro Bakhtiar with whom he has contested elections with, for the National Assembly seat of NA-177 (RahimYarKhan-III).

=== Sexual harassment allegations ===
On 5 June 2020, American journalist Cynthia Ritchie accused former federal minister Shahabuddin along with former prime minister Yousuf Raza Gillani of having sexually harassed her at President House Islamabad in 2011.

== Legal trouble ==
On the day of his nomination as PM the Anti-Narcotics Force issued a non-bailable warrant for his arrest. The Supreme Court of Pakistan in its decision to grant him bail observed that it was not merely a coincidence that the warrants for his arrest were issued upon the very day that he was nominated by the PPP.
