= Khusro Bakhtiar =

Pakistani politician

Makhdoom Khusro Bakhtiar
- مخدوم خسرو بختیار
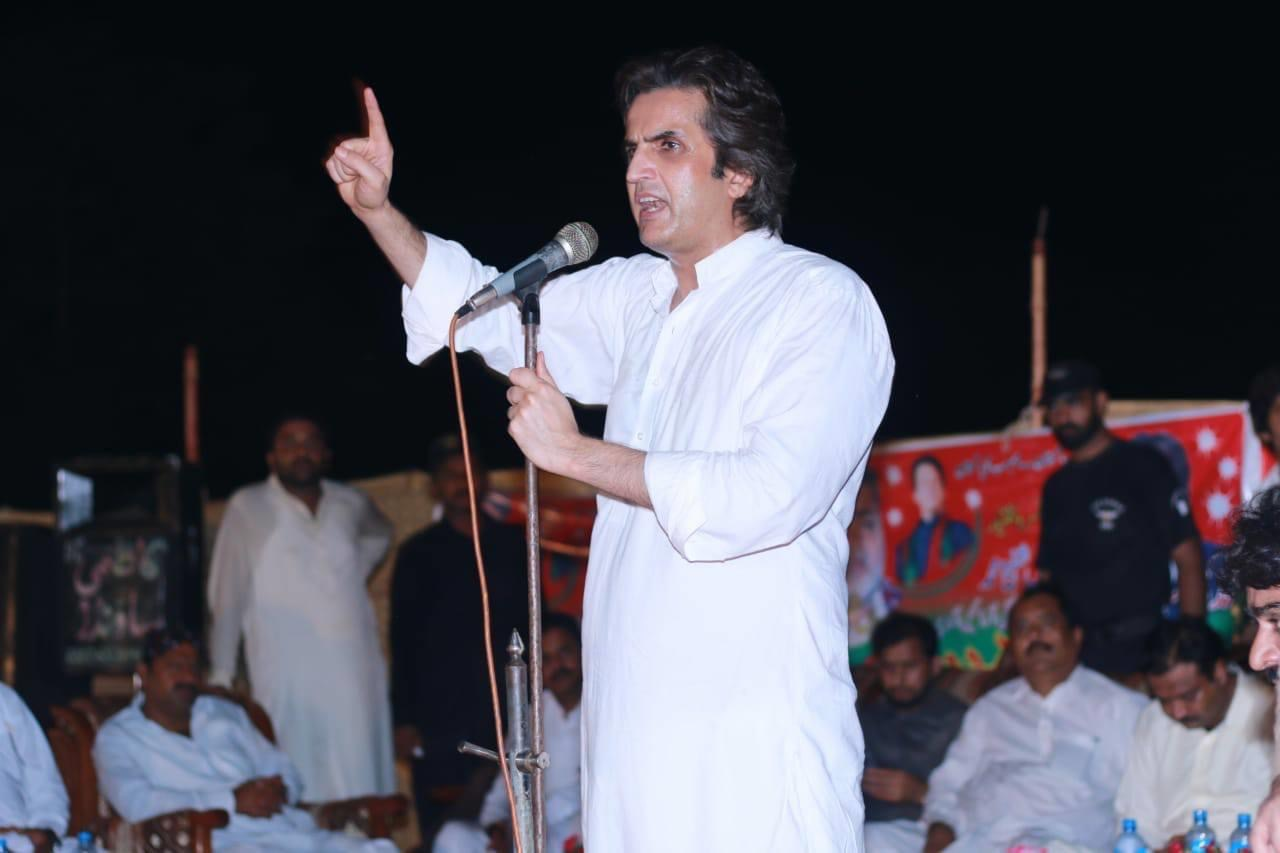

Federal Minister for Industries & Production
- In office 17 April 2021 – 10 April 2022
- Prime Minister: Imran Khan
- Preceded by: Hammad Azhar

Federal Minister for Economic Affairs
- In office 6 April 2020 – 17 April 2021
- President: Arif Alvi
- Prime Minister: Imran Khan
- Preceded by: Hammad Azhar
- Succeeded by: Omar Ayub Khan

Federal Minister for National Food Security and Research
- In office 19 November 2019 – 6 April 2020
- President: Arif Alvi
- Prime Minister: Imran Khan
- Preceded by: Sahabzada Mehboob Sultan
- Succeeded by: Syed Fakhar Imam

Federal Minister for Planning Development & Reform
- In office 20 August 2018 – 18 November 2019
- Prime Minister: Imran Khan
- Preceded by: Shamshad Akhtar (caretaker)
- Succeeded by: Asad Umar

Chairman Standing Committee on Foreign Affairs
- In office 28 September 2017 – 31 May 2018
- President: Mamnoon Hussain
- Prime Minister: Shahid Khaqan Abbasi

Federal Minister of State for Foreign Affairs (MSFA)
- In office 4 September 2004 – 15 November 2007
- President: Pervez Musharraf
- Prime Minister: Shaukat Aziz
- Minister: Khurshid Mahmood Kasuri
- Chief Minister: Shehbaz Sharif

Advisor to Chief Minister of Punjab (Provincial Minister of Punjab)
- In office 1997–1999

Member of the National Assembly of Pakistan
- In office 13 August 2018 – 20 January 2023
- Constituency: NA-177 (Rahim Yar Khan-III)
- In office 1 June 2013 – 31 May 2018
- Constituency: NA-194 (Rahim Yar Khan-III)
- In office 10 October 2002 – 15 February 2008

Member of the Provincial Assembly of Punjab
- In office 1997–1999
- Constituency: PP-236 (Rahim Yar Khan-V)

Personal details
- Born: 7 July 1967 (age 59) Rahim Yar Khan, Punjab, Pakistan
- Party: Independent
- Other political affiliations: PTI (2018-2022); PMLN (2013-2018); PML(Q) (2008-2013); PML(Q) (2001-2008); PMLN (1997-1999); PPP (1993-1996); PMLN (1997-2002)
- Relatives: Makhdoom Hashim Jawan Bakht (Brother); Makhdum Omar Shehryar (Brother)
- Education: University of Punjab, London School of Economics, Lincoln's Inn

Makhdum Khusro Bakhtyar (Urdu: مخدوم خسرو بختیار; born 7 July 1967) is a Pakistani politician who recently served as Pakistan's Federal Minister for Industries & Production. Previously, he has served as Federal Minister of Economic Affairs, Federal Minister of National Food Security and Research and Federal Minister for Planning, Development and Reforms in the PTI Government under the leadership of Prime Minister Imran Khan. He had been a member of the National Assembly of Pakistan from 2002 to 2008, 2013 to 2018 and 2018 till 2023.

Previously, he was a member of the Provincial Assembly of the Punjab from 1997 to 1999 and served as provincial advisor to the then Chief Minister, Shehbaz Sharif. During his first tenure as Member of the National Assembly, he served as Minister of State for Foreign Affairs from September 2004 to November 2007 in the Federal Cabinet of Prime Minister Shaukat Aziz.

== Early life and education ==
Bakhtyar was born on 7 July 1967. He hails from Mian Wali Qureshian, a village in the Rahim Yar Khan District of Punjab and belongs to a prominent political family.

He graduated from the University of Punjab in 1990, and received an LLB (Hons.) degree in 1994 from the London School of Economics and Political Science and a Bar-at-Law degree from Lincoln's Inn, United Kingdom in 1995.

== Political career ==
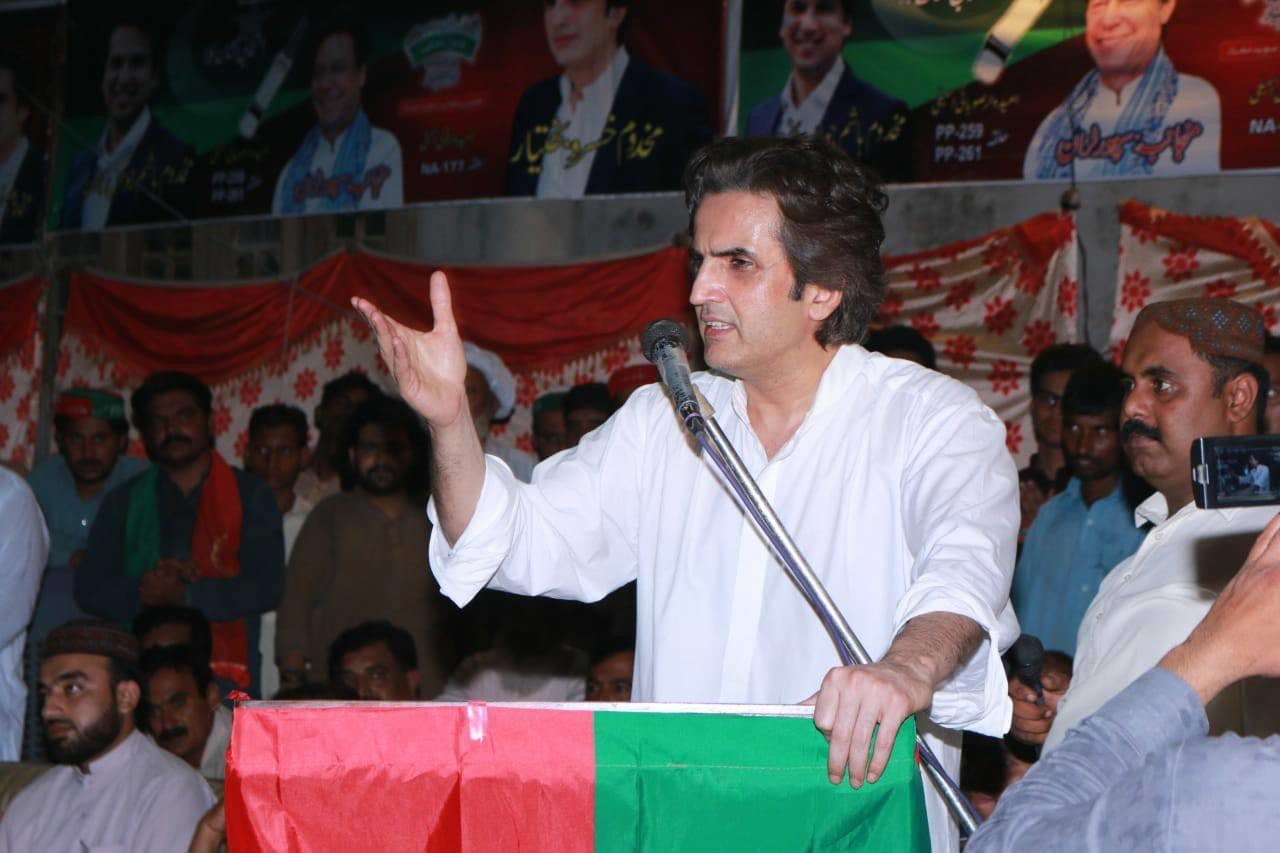
Bakhtiar speaking at a political rally, 2018 elections

He was elected to the Provincial Assembly of the Punjab as a candidate of Pakistan Muslim League (N) (PML-N) from Constituency PP-236 (Rahim Yar Khan-V) in the 1997 Pakistani general election. He received 19,736 votes and defeated Makhdoom Ashfaq Ahmad, a candidate of Pakistan Peoples Party (PPP).

He was elected to the National Assembly of Pakistan as a candidate of Pakistan Muslim League (Q) (PML-Q) from Constituency NA-194 (Rahim Yar Khan-III) in the 2002 Pakistani general election. He received 70,116 votes and defeated Makhdoom Shahabuddin. In the same election, he also ran for the seat of the Provincial Assembly of the Punjab as a candidate of PML-Q from Constituency PP-291 (Rahim Yar Khan-VII) but he was unsuccessful.

On 4 September 2004, he was inducted into the Federal Cabinet of Prime Minister Shaukat Aziz and was appointed Minister of State for Foreign Affairs. He continued to serve as Minister of State for Foreign Affairs until 15 November 2007.

He ran for the seat of the National Assembly as a candidate of PML-Q from Constituency NA-194 (Rahim Yar Khan-III) in the 2008 Pakistani general election, but was unsuccessful. He received 42,442 votes and lost the seat to Makhdoom Shahabuddin.

He was re-elected to the National Assembly as an independent candidate from Constituency NA-194 (Rahim Yar Khan-III) in the 2013 Pakistani general election. He received 64,272 votes and defeated Makhdoom Shahabuddin. In the same election, he also ran for the seat of the National Assembly as an independent candidate from Constituency NA-195 (Rahim Yar Khan-IV) but was unsuccessful. He received 46,897 votes and lost the seat to Mustafa Mehmood. In the same election, he was re-elected to the Provincial Assembly of the Punjab as an independent candidate from Constituency PP-289 (Rahimyar Khan-V). He received 25,898 votes and defeated Mian Muhammad Aslam Advocate. Following the election, he abandoned his Punjab Assembly seat in favor of the National Assembly seat.

On 23 May 2013, he joined PML-N. In 2017 he was made Chairman House Standing Committee on Foreign Affairs

In March 2018, he became business partner of Jahangir Khan Tareen after they together purchased a sugar mill for Rs 27 billion. This triggered speculation that he might join PTI soon.

On 9 April 2018, Bakhtyar, together with seven other PML-N parliamentarians, quit the PML-N and formed a new group under the name of "Junoobi Punjab Suba Mahaaz". The group accused PML-N of ignoring the southern part of Punjab and demanded the creation of separate province for southern Punjab. On 30 April, he resigned from his National Assembly seat in protest.

On 9 May 2018, Junoobi Punjab Sooba Mahaaz (JPSM) merged with Pakistan Tehreek-e-Insaf (PTI) after the latter promised to create a South Punjab province on administrative grounds. Subsequently, Bakhtyar joined PTI after signing an agreement with PTI chairman Imran Khan on the promise of the creation of a South Punjab province and an equitable distribution of resources to the region.

He was re-elected to the National Assembly as a candidate of PTI from Constituency NA-177 (Rahim Yar Khan-III) in the 2018 Pakistani general election after securing 100,768 votes.

On 18 August, Imran Khan formally announced his federal cabinet structure and Bakhtyar was named as Minister for Water Resources. However, on 20 August 2018, he was sworn in as Federal Minister for Planning, Development and Reforms in the federal cabinet of Prime Minister Imran Khan. On 19 November 2019, he was appointed as Federal Minister for National Food Security and Research and served in that position until a perceived conflict of interest arose due to his sugar business, after which he resigned on 6 April 2020. He was appointed Minister of Economic Affairs after a cabinet reshuffle. After a year of holding the Economic Affairs portfolio, Bakhtiar was made Federal Minister of Industries & Production, a position which he held until the end of the Imran Khan government on 10 April 2022. He was also appointed president for the Pakistan Tehreek-e-Insaf South Punjab chapter in December 2021. In May 2023, Bakhtiar announced his decision to leave party positions, saying the "May 9 incidents" led him to reevaluate his alignment with PTI's ideology. Bakhtiar revealed his plan to resign from key positions, including his membership in the core committee and presidency of the South Punjab chapter.

Political offices
Preceded by Inam-ul-Haq	Minister of State for Foreign Affairs; 2004 – 2007	Succeeded by Malik Amad Khan
