= Makhdoom Tahir Rashid ud Din =

Member of the National Assembly of Pakistan from Rahim Yar Khan (2024–2029)

Makhdoom Tahir Rashid ud Din Shah
- مخدوم طاہر رشیدُالدین شاہ

Member of the National Assembly of Pakistan
- Incumbent
- Assumed office 14 September 2024
- Preceded by: Mumtaz Mustafa
- Constituency: NA-171 Rahim Yar Khan-III

Personal details
- Party: PPP (2024-present)
- Parent: Makhdoom Shahabuddin (father)

Makhdoom Tahir Rashid ud Din Shah (Urdu: مخدوم طاہر رشیدُالدین شاہ) is a Pakistani politician who is a member of the National Assembly of Pakistan since 14 September 2024.

== Political career ==
Rashid ud Din was elected to the National Assembly of Pakistan from NA-171 Rahim Yar Khan-III as a candidate of Pakistan People’s Party (PPP) in a by-election held on 12 September 2024. He received 116,429 votes and defeated Rais Hassan Mustafa, a candidate of Independent (politician) (PTI) Supported Pakistan Tehreek-e-Insaf. Hassan, claimed that the election was rigged.
