= Mumtaz Mustafa =

Pakistani politician (died 2024)

- ممتاز مصطفیٰ
- Official portrait, 2024

Member of the National Assembly of Pakistan
- In office 29 February 2024 – 5 August 2024
- Succeeded by: Makhdoom Tahir Rashid ud Din
- Constituency: NA-171 Rahim Yar Khan-III

Personal details
- Died: 5 August 2024 Islamabad, Pakistan
- Party: PTI (2024-2024)

Mumtaz Mustafa Rais (Urdu: ممتاز مصطفیٰ; died 5 August 2024) was a Pakistani politician who was a member of the National Assembly of Pakistan from 29 February 2024 to 5 August 2024.

== Political career ==
On 26 November 2007, Mustafa quit the Pakistan People's Party (PPP) and joined the Pakistan Muslim League (F) (PML-F).

Mustafa contested the 2008 Punjab provincial election from PP-293 Rahim Yar Khan-IX as a candidate of PML-F, but was unsuccessful. He received 11,526 votes and was defeated by Javid Akbar Dhillon, a candidate of PPP.

On 31 January 2010, he was elected Vice Chairman of Punjab Bar Council for a one-year term. On 20 March 2016, he was elected as Chairman of the Executive Committee of Punjab Bar Council for a one-year term.

In the lead-up to the 2024 Pakistani general election, a police case with Anti-Terrorism provisions was filed against Mustafa and his colleagues in January 2024 for allegedly attacking the Assistant Returning Officer of NA-171 Rahim Yar Khan-III. According to reports, he requested the return of his election nomination papers and also demanded to replace his documents from Pakistan Tehreek-e-Insaf (PTI) to Pakistan Tehreek-e-Insaf Nazriati (PTI-N) and insisted on being allotted the symbol of PTI-N. According to the report, Mustafa and his colleagues threatened the Assistant Returning Officer and his staff with dire consequences.

He was elected to the National Assembly of Pakistan as an independent candidate supported by PTI from NA-171 Rahim Yar Khan-III in the 2024 Pakistani general election. He received 103,834 votes and defeated an independent candidate, Hashim Jawan Bakht, who secured 56,028 votes.

== Death ==
Mustafa died from a heart attack in Islamabad on 5 August 2024.
