= Khanpur Katora Tehsil =

Tehsil in Punjab, Pakistan

Khanpur Katora Tehsil تحصیل خانپور کٹورا
- Tehsil
- Location within Punjab, Pakistan Location within Pakistan
- Coordinates: 28.650°N 70.680°E
- Country: Pakistan
- Province: (Punjab, Pakistan) Punjab
- District: Rahim Yar Khan
- Headquarter: Khanpur Katora

Area
  - Tehsil: 3,190 km^{2} (1,230 sq mi)

Population (2023 census)
  - Tehsil: 1,169,138
  - Density: 367/km^{2} (949/sq mi)
  - Urban: 324,149 (27.73%)
  - Rural: 844,989 (72.23%)

Literacy (2023)
  - Literacy rate: 50.08%
- Time zone: UTC+5 (PST)
- Calling code: 06855

Khanpur Katora Tehsil (Urdu: تحصیل خانپور کٹورا) is a sub-division of Rahim Yar Khan District, in the Punjab province of Pakistan.

== Demographics ==
=== Population ===
Historical population
| Year | Pop. | ±% p.a. |
|---|---|---|
| 1951 | 108,335 | — |
| 1961 | 227,722 | +7.71% |
| 1972 | 325,447 | +3.30% |
| 1981 | 420,688 | +2.89% |
| 1998 | 683,865 | +2.90% |
| 2017 | 982,085 | +1.92% |
| 2023 | 1,169,138 | +2.95% |

According to 2023 census, Khanpur Katora Tehsil had a population of 1,169,138.

Majority of the population are Muslims (97.26%). Hinduism is practised by 2.24% of the population. Other minorities include Christians and Ahmadiyyas.

== See also ==
- Firoza, Rahim Yar Khan
- Liaquatpur
- Zahir Pir
