= Shivala Teja Singh temple =

Hindu temple in Sialkot, Pakistan

Coordinates: 32.4909°N 74.545048°E

Shivala Teja Singh temple شیوالا تیجا سنگھ مندر
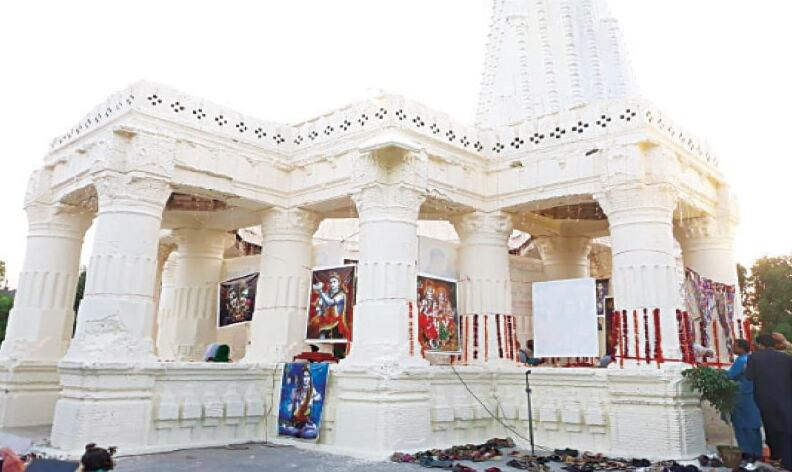
- Shawala Teja Singh Temple after Renovation

Religion
- Affiliation: Hinduism
- District: Sialkot
- Deity: Shiva
- Governing body: Pakistan Hindu Council

Location
- State: Punjab, Pakistan
- Country: Pakistan
- Interactive map of Shivala Teja Singh temple شیوالا تیجا سنگھ مندر

Architecture
- Type: Hindu temple
- Creator: Sardar Teja Singh
- Temple: 1

Website
- https://pakistanhinducouncil.org.pk/

Shivala Teja Singh temple is a historic Hindu temple in the Sialkot city of Punjab province of Pakistan. The temple was built by Teja Singh. It is dedicated to Shiva.

== History ==
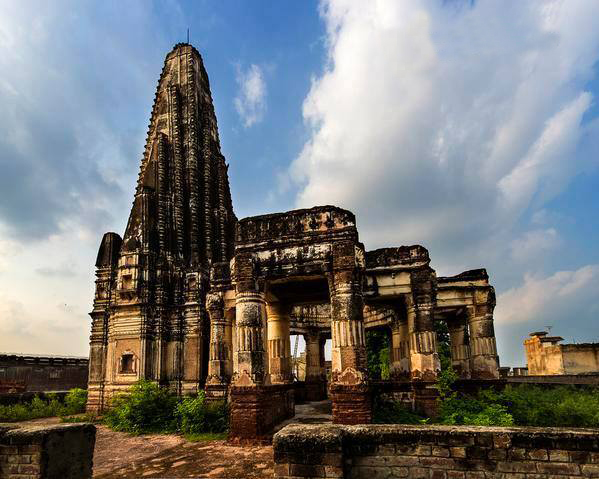
Shiwala Teja Singh Temple. (before Renovation)

The temple was built by Sardar Teja Singh. The temple was sealed in 1947 during the Partition. In 1992, the temple was partially demolished by miscreants. In 2015, local Hindu leaders have urged the Pakistan government to ensure the early repairing of the crumbling building of Shawala Teja Singh temple.

== Reopening and renovation ==
After 72 years, Prime Minister Imran Khan, reopened the temple to Hindus. Pakistan government's Evacuee Trust Property Board (ETPB) has chalked out a plan for the renovation and preservation of the temple with the help of Lahore-based Sir Ganga Ram Heritage Foundation.

In 2019, the Pakistan government renovated and formally handed over the centuries-old Shawala Teja Singh Temple to the Pakistan Hindu Council for facilitating pilgrim visits and other rituals.
