= Krishna Temple, Sadiqabad =

Hindu temple in Pakistan

Shri Krishna Mandir Pawan Dham, Sadiqabad
- بھگوان شری کرشن مندر
- Location within Punjab, Pakistan Location within Pakistan Location within Asia

Religion
- Affiliation: Hinduism
- District: Rahim Yar Khan District
- Deity: Krishna
- Festival: Janmastami

Location
- Location: Sadiqabad
- State: Punjab, Pakistan
- Country: Pakistan
- Interactive map of Shri Krishna Mandir Pawan Dham, Sadiqabad
- Coordinates: 28°18′31.199″N 70°7′41.881″E

Architecture
- Type: Hindu Temple

Shri Krishna Temple is a Hindu temple located in the Sadiqabad Tehsil in the Rahim Yar Khan District in the Punjab province of Pakistan. The temple is famous for the Krishna Janmastami celebration which is participated by Hindus from Sindh and Southern Punjab. The Janmastami festival lasts for 2–3 days and a big mela is conducted. In 2017, the Punjab government released money for the renovation of the temple.

== See also ==
- Krishna Temple, Rawalpindi
- Ramapir Temple Tando Allahyar
- Umarkot Shiv Mandir
- Hinglaj Mata mandir
- Baba Ram Thaman Shrine
