= Khanpur Katora =

City in Punjab, Pakistan

Khanpur خانپور کٹورا (Urdu)
- City
- Khanpur Katora
- Location within Punjab, Pakistan Location within Pakistan
- Coordinates: 28.650°N 70.680°E
- Country: Pakistan
- Province: (Punjab, Pakistan) Punjab
- District: Rahim Yar Khan
- Tehsil: Khanpur Katora

Government
  - Type: Municipal Committee
  - Administrator: Sajjad Ahmed
  - Chief Officer: Sajid Raiz

Area
  - Metro: 3,065 km^{2} (1,183 sq mi)

Population (2023 census)
  - City: 247,170
  - Rank: 38th in Pakistan
- Time zone: UTC+5 (PST)
- Calling code: 06855

Khanpur Katora (Urdu: خانپور کٹورا) is a city and capital of Khanpur Katora Tehsil of the Rahim Yar Khan District, in the Punjab province of Pakistan.

It was the 38th largest city of Pakistan by population, according to the 2023 census.

== Etymology ==
The name Katora (meaning “bowl” in local usage) is traditionally said to refer to the town’s bowl-like geography and historic local pottery industry; the place is often locally called Khanpur Katora to distinguish it from other towns named Khanpur.

== Economy ==
The local economy is primarily agricultural. Major crops in the Khanpur region include sugarcane, cotton, wheat and vegetables; the availability of canal irrigation in the district has supported intensive agriculture and related agro-industries. Local sweets and food products (for example the local dairy-based confections) are also well known in the region.

== Demographics ==
Population

Historical population

Year	Pop.	±% p.a.
1951	15,197	—
1961	31,465	+7.55%
1972	49,235	+4.15%
1981	70,589	+4.08%

Year	Pop.	±% p.a.
1998	120,382	+3.19%
2017	184,793	+2.28%
2023	247,170	+4.97%

According to 2023 census, Khanpur Katora had a population of 247,170.

Languages

Languages of Khanpur MC (2023)
1. Saraiki (54.7%)
2. Punjabi (27.4%)
3. Urdu (16.5%)
4. Others (1.40%)

== Climate ==
Khanpur Katora has a hot desert climate (Köppen climate classification BWh) with hot summers and mild winters. Rainfall is low, but some rainfall occurs in the monsoon season from July to September.

Climate data for Khanpur Katora (1991-2020)
Month	Jan	Feb	Mar	Apr	May	Jun	Jul	Aug	Sep	Oct	Nov	Dec	Year
Record high °C (°F)	29.4 (84.9)	32.8 (91.0)	40.6 (105.1)	46.4 (115.5)	50.2 (122.4)	48.0 (118.4)	46.7 (116.1)	43.3 (109.9)	42.2 (108.0)	41.1 (106.0)	37.0 (98.6)	32.0 (89.6)	50.2 (122.4)
Mean daily maximum °C (°F)	21.1 (70.0)	24.6 (76.3)	30.2 (86.4)	37.6 (99.7)	42.1 (107.8)	42.2 (108.0)	39.6 (103.3)	37.8 (100.0)	36.8 (98.2)	35.0 (95.0)	29.6 (85.3)	23.9 (75.0)	33.4 (92.1)
Daily mean °C (°F)	13.3 (55.9)	16.6 (61.9)	22.2 (72.0)	28.8 (83.8)	33.7 (92.7)	35.1 (95.2)	33.9 (93.0)	32.4 (90.3)	30.6 (87.1)	26.6 (79.9)	20.7 (69.3)	15.4 (59.7)	25.8 (78.4)
Mean daily minimum °C (°F)	5.3 (41.5)	8.5 (47.3)	14.1 (57.4)	20.0 (68.0)	25.2 (77.4)	28.0 (82.4)	28.3 (82.9)	27.1 (80.8)	24.5 (76.1)	18.2 (64.8)	11.8 (53.2)	6.8 (44.2)	18.2 (64.7)
Record low °C (°F)	−3.3 (26.1)	−2.8 (27.0)	2.0 (35.6)	6.5 (43.7)	11.0 (51.8)	13.0 (55.4)	17.0 (62.6)	18.0 (64.4)	14.8 (58.6)	5.0 (41.0)	0.6 (33.1)	−4.3 (24.3)	−4.3 (24.3)
Average precipitation mm (inches)	5.0 (0.20)	9.4 (0.37)	8.6 (0.34)	8.7 (0.34)	5.2 (0.20)	10.3 (0.41)	40.1 (1.58)	34.7 (1.37)	22.7 (0.89)	2.4 (0.09)	1.4 (0.06)	5.2 (0.20)	153.7 (6.05)
Average precipitation days (≥ 1.0 mm)	1.1	1.6	1.5	1.3	1.1	1.3	2.3	1.8	1.1	0.5	0.3	0.4	14.3
Average relative humidity (%)	60	58	50	37	37	50	58	67	65	59	55	65	55
Mean monthly sunshine hours	—	—	—	—	—	260.4	—	267.0	—	277.8	236.6	—	—
Source: NOAA, Deutscher Wetterdienst (humidity 1931-1940), Ogimet

== See also ==
- Liaquatpur
- Firoza, Rahim Yar Khan
- Rahim Yar Khan
