= Rais, Iran =

Rais رییس/ رئیس
- Village
- Location within Iran
- Coordinates: 34°38′26″N 46°32′01″E
- Country: Iran
- Province: Kermanshah
- County: Ravansar
- Bakhsh: Central
- Rural District: Dowlatabad

Population (2006)
  - Total: 154
- Time zone: UTC+3:30 (IRST)
  - Summer (DST): UTC+4:30 (IRDT)

Rais (Persian: رییس or رئیس; also Romanized as Ra’īs) is a village in Dowlatabad Rural District, in the Central District of Ravansar County, Kermanshah Province, Iran. At the 2006 census, its population was 154, in 29 families.
