= Allah Abad, Rahim Yar Khan =

Allah Abad
- Town
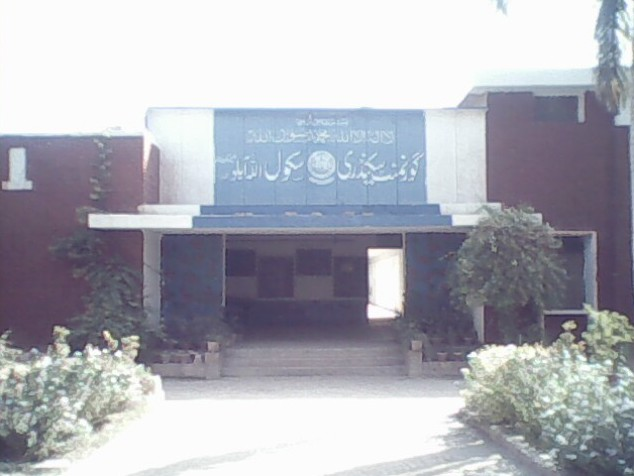
- Entrance of Government High School

- Location within Pakistan
- Coordinates: 28°56′N 70°58′E
- Country: Pakistan
- Province: Punjab

Area
  - Total: 9 km^{2} (3.5 sq mi)

Population (1998)
  - Total: 37,500
- Time zone: UTC+5 (PST)
- Calling code: 068
- Languages: Punjabi, Seraiki, Urdu

Allah Abad is a town and Union Council in Punjab, province of Pakistan. It is located in Liaqatpur Tehsil, in the district of Rahim Yar Khan.

== History ==
Allah Abad is one of the oldest towns in Bahawalpur. When it was a princely state, Allah Abad was used as a second unofficial capital after Dera Nawab. Now, this town is a union council of Liaquatpur. It has one of the most popular school in Rahimyarkhan District, namely, Allah Abad Government Secondary High School. The town also houses a Girls High School and three to four government-run primary schools, reflecting its longstanding commitment to public education. Key public infrastructure includes a historic Eid Prayer Ground, government hospital, WAPDA Colony, Water SDO offices, and a Government Rest House. However, the current condition of both the WAPDA Colony and the Government Rest House is reported to be very poor, indicating a need for maintenance and administrative attention.

Allah Abad is also home to several historic structures that reflect its rich cultural past. Among them is the Dharamshala—a traditional Hindu wedding place—which stands as a remnant of the Hindu era, symbolizing the town’s pluralistic heritage before the partition of British India.

== Transport ==
Allahabad is linked with Liaquatpur with two way 6.5 km. asphalt road. On the other end, it is linked with Jan Pur, a main hub on KLP road. On the west with Amin Abad, another town approximately 9 kilometers far from Allah Abad Allahabad is also located approximately 23.6 kilometers from the Tranda Muhammad Panah Interchange – Exit 6 on the Sukkur–Multan Motorway (M-5). The route proceeds via Tranda Muhammad Panah and offers a relatively short and direct access between the interchange and the town. Additionally, Allahabad is connected to Tranda Muhammad Panah itself—an important junction on both the Motorway and the KLP Road—at a distance of approximately 18.8 kilometers.

== See also ==
- Liaqatpur
