= Lar, Punjab =

Lar لاڑ
- Town
- Lar
- Location in Pakistan
- Coordinates: 30°11′52″N 71°28′11″E
- Country: Pakistan
- Region: Punjab
- District: Multan District

Government
  - Type: Local Govt

Area
  - Total: 10 km^{2} (3.9 sq mi)
- Time zone: UTC+5 (PST)
- 59130: 59130

Lar (Urdu: لاڑ) is a town in tehsil and district Multan of Punjab, Pakistan. It lies on the N-5 National Highway, the longest national highway in Pakistan.

== Health ==
- LRBT Free Secondary Eye Hospital
