= Rais Muhammad Iqbal =

Pakistani politician

Provincial Minister for Mines and Mineral Affairs
- In office 2002–2008

Personal details
- Born: 1954 (age 71–72) Allah Abad, Pakistan
- Party: Pakistan Muslim League (Q)
- Profession: Politician, Lawyer

Rais Muhammad Iqbal (born 1954 in Allah Abad) is a lawyer and a member of the Provincial Assembly of the Punjab from Liaquat Pur.
