= Khanqah Sharif =

Coordinates: 29°31′N 71°45′E

- City
- Location within Pakistan
- Country: Pakistan
- Province: Punjab
- District: Bahawalpur

Population
  - Total: 32,739
- Time zone: UTC+5 (PST)
  - Summer (DST): UTC+6 (PDT)
- Postal code: khanqah Mubarak

Khanqah Sharif is a city located west of Bahawalpur District, Pakistan. It is known for the shrine of Khawaja Mohkam Din Serani. According to local accounts, two shrines are associated with Khawaja Serani: one in Khanqah Sharif, Pakistan, and another in Dhoraji, Rajkot, India.

An annual Urs commemorating Khawaja Serani is held from the 1st to the 5th of Rabi al-Thani. The event attracts visitors from different parts of Pakistan, including members of the Memon community from Karachi

The surrounding area is also known for its mango and orange cultivation. Mangoes produced in the region are distributed to domestic and international markets.

Saraiki is the main language spoken in the city, while Urdu, English, Punjabi and Pushto are also widely used. The city is over 200 years old and has three Gardens as well as many mosques and schools.Khanqah Sharif
