= Sadeqabad-e Lachari =

Sadeqabad-e Lachari صادق ابادلاچري
- Village
- Location within Iran
- Coordinates: 30°12′18″N 53°33′28″E
- Country: Iran
- Province: Fars
- County: Bavanat
- Bakhsh: Sarchehan
- Rural District: Bagh Safa

Population (2006)
  - Total: 62
- Time zone: UTC+3:30 (IRST)
  - Summer (DST): UTC+4:30 (IRDT)

Sadeqabad-e Lachari (Persian: صادق ابادلاچري, also Romanized as Şādeqābād-e Lācharī and Şadeqābād-e Lāchrī; also known as Lācharī, Lācharī, Şadeqābād, and Şadeqābād) is a village in Bagh Safa Rural District, Sarchehan District, Bavanat County, Fars province, Iran. At the 2006 census, its population was 62, in 13 families.
