= Wan Radha Ram =

Coordinates: 30°57′0″N 73°45′0″E

Wan Radha Ram (now Habibabad) is a town and Union Council of Kasur District in the Punjab province of Pakistan. It is part of Pattoki Tehsil and is located at 30°56'60N 73°45'0E with an altitude of 181 metres (597 feet).
