= Sanjarpur =

Village in Uttar Pradesh, India

Sanjarpur संजरपुर, سنجر پور
- Village
- Location in Uttar Pradesh, India Sanjarpur (India)
- Coordinates: 26.012180°N 82.972972°E
- Country: India
- State: Uttar Pradesh
- District: Azamgarh

Government
  - Type: Local
  - Body: Gram panchayat
  - Sarpanch: Mohammed Emdadullah

Area
  - Total: 3.403 km^{2} (1.314 sq mi)
- Elevation: 83 m (272 ft)

Population (2011)
  - Total: 6,540
  - Density: 1,920/km^{2} (4,980/sq mi)
- Demonym: Sanjari
- Time zone: UTC+5:30 (IST)
- Postal code: 223227
- Vehicle registration: UP-50
- Website: up.gov.in

Sanjarpur is a village and gram panchayat in Azamgarh district, Uttar Pradesh.

== Demographics ==
Sanjarpur is a muslim-dominated village. The population of Sanjarpur is 6540, out of which 3294 are males while 3246 are females. The average sex-ratio of Sanjarpur village is 985 Females per 1000 Males, which is higher than Uttar Pradesh state average of 912 Females per 1000 Males. The average literacy rate of Sanjarpur village is 83.61%, while male literacy stands at 88.92% and female literacy stands at 78.27%.

== Transport ==
Roadways :

Sanjarpur is at a distance of 35 km from the nearest Purvanchal Expressway entry/exit in Mahul, Uttar Pradesh.

Airways :

Azamgarh Airport, located 40 km away from Sanjarpur is the nearest domestic airport.

Lal Bahadur Shastri Airport, located 91 km away from Sanjarpur is the nearest international airport.

Railways :

Sanjarpur Railway Station (SJER) serves the Sanjarpur village. The station has 2 Platforms and 2 Tracks. Only 4 Passenger trains stop at the station, making Sanjarpur a fairly small halt station. Due to this, people from Sanjarpur have to travel to either Sarai Meer Railway station or Azamgarh railway station to board trains going to major cities such as Mumbai, Lucknow, New Delhi, Kolkata, Gorakhpur and more.

== Politics ==
There are more than 5000 voters in Sanjarpur, out of which more than 2700 are Muslims, more than 1500 are SC, more than 300 are Prajapatis, more than 300 are Yadavs and more than 150 are Guptas.

Sanjarpur belongs to the Lalganj Lok Sabha constituency in the Lok Sabha, and the Nizamabad Assembly constituency in the Uttar Pradesh Vidhan Sabha.
Before the delimitation process in 2004, Sanjarpur belonged to the Azamgarh Lok Sabha constituency and the SaraiMeer Assembly constituency. After the delimitation process, the boundaries of the Azamgarh Lok Sabha constituency was re-evaluated. The Azamgarh Lok Sabha constituency was split into two constituencies, which were Azamgarh and Lalganj, meanwhile the assembly segments were re-evaluated as well and the SaraiMeer Assembly constituency combined with the Nizamabad Assembly constituency.

== See also ==
- Sarai Mir
- Azamgarh
- Shahganj
