= Zahir Peer =

City in Punjab, Pakistan

Zahir Pir ظاہر پیر
- City
- Location within Pakistan
- Coordinates: 28.810°N 70.526°E
- Country: Pakistan
- Province: Punjab
- District: Rahim Yar Khan
- Tehsil: Khanpur Katora

Population (2023 census)
  - Total: 76,979
- Time zone: UTC+5 (PST)
- Postal code: 64130
- Calling code: 0685

Zahir Pir is a city in Rahim Yar Khan District of Punjab province of Pakistan. It is located on N-5 Highway. It has Motorway Exchange from M-5 also. Zahir Pir is connected with Rahim Yar Khan District HQ (65 km) Khanpur Katora Tehsil HQ (25 km), Chachran Sharif on Indus river bank (11 km) and connected to Kot Mitthan (25 km) via a bridge.

== Demographics ==
Population

Historical population
Year	Pop.	±%
1998	29,557	—
2017	48,493	+64.1%
2023	76,979	+58.7%

According to the 2023 Census of Pakistan, the population of Zahir Pir reached 76,979, up from 48,493 recorded in the 2017 Census. Between 2017 and 2023, the town registered a rapid annual population growth rate of 8.1%. The 2023 demographic structure reflects a gender distribution of 40,226 males (52.3%) and 36,707 females (47.7%).
