= Hashim Jawan Bakht =

Pakistani politician

Makhdoom Hashim Jawan Bakht
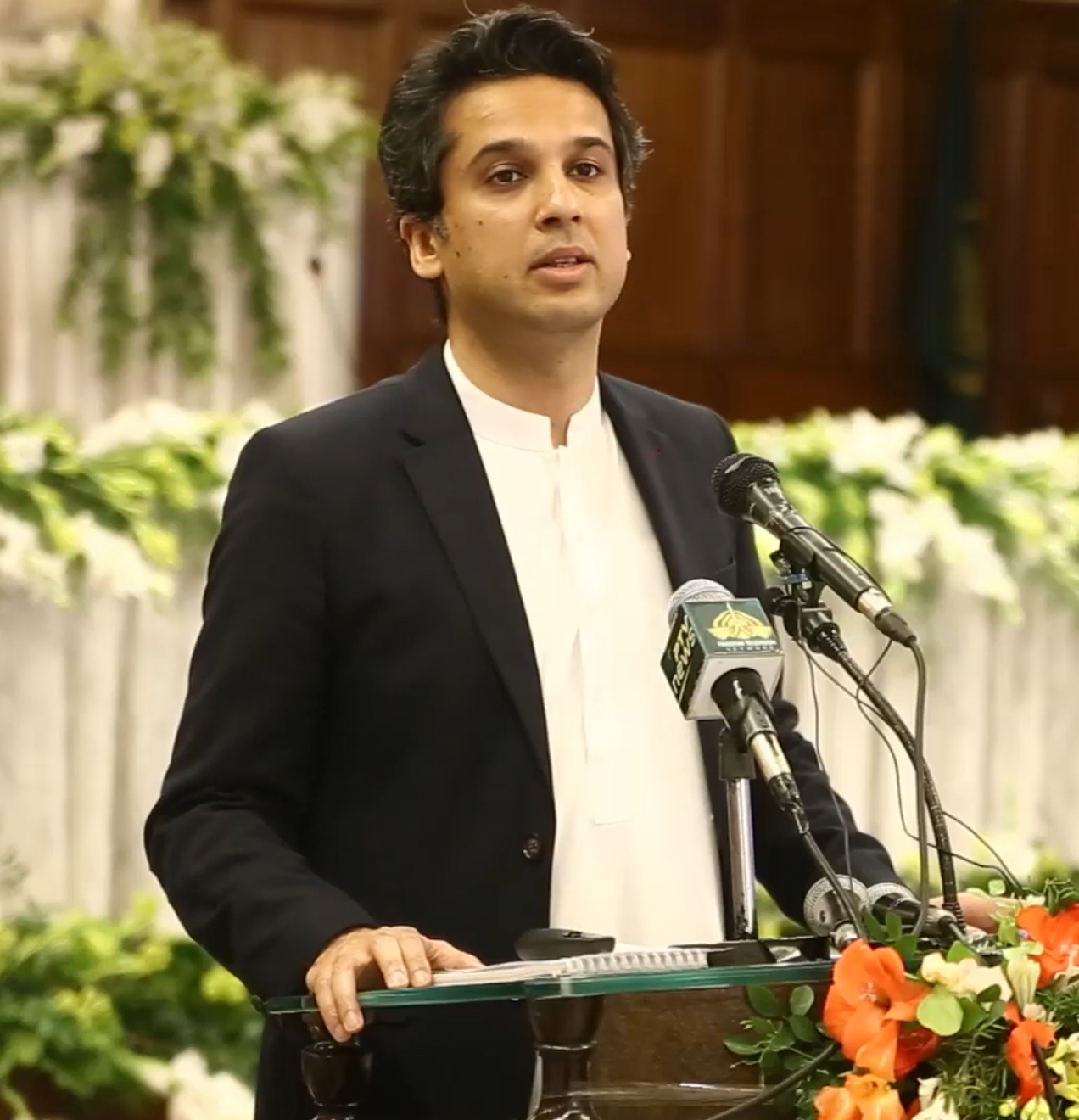

Provincial Minister of Punjab for Finance
- In office 27 August 2018 – April 2022
- Governor: Chaudhry Mohammad Sarwar
- Chief Minister: Usman Buzdar

Member of the Provincial Assembly of the Punjab
- In office 15 August 2018 – 14 January 2023
- Constituency: PP-259 Rahim Yar Khan-V
- In office 29 May 2013 – 30 May 2018
- Constituency: PP-291 (Rahimyar Khan-VII)

Personal details
- Born: 27 September 1973 (age 53) Rahim Yar Khan, Punjab, Pakistan
- Party: IPP (2023-present)
- Other political affiliations: PTI (2018-2022)
- Relatives: Khusro Bakhtiar (brother)

Makhdoom Hashim Jawan Bakht is a Pakistani politician who was the Provincial Minister of Punjab for Finance, in office from 27 August 2018 till April 2022. He had been a member of the Provincial Assembly of the Punjab from August 2018 till January 2023 under the Pakistan Tehreek-e-Insaf.

== Early life and education ==
Bakht was born on 27 September 1979 in Rahim Yar Khan, Punjab. He studied at the Aitchison College, Lahore for schooling from 1986 to 1997. His brother, Makhdoom Khusro Bakhtiar is also a graduate from the college and is a politician who is considered to be in a political duo with Bakht.

Bakht graduated with a Bachelor of Commerce degree from the McGill University. He began his career in the banking and finance sector and served as vice president, Corporate & Investment Banking Division at Citibank.

== Political career ==
=== Provincial Assembly of the Punjab ===
Bakht was elected to the Provincial Assembly of the Punjab as a candidate of the Pakistan Muslim League (N) from PP-291 (Rahimyar Khan-VII) in the 2013 Punjab provincial election. Following this, he served as chairman, Standing Committee on Finance and later resigned from the assembly.

Bakht joined the Pakistan Tehreek-e-Insaf (PTI) and was elected to the Provincial Assembly of the Punjab as a candidate of PTI from PP-259 (Rahim Yar Khan-V) and from PP-261 (Rahim Yar Khan-VII) in the 2018 Punjab provincial election.

=== Minister of Finance, Punjab (2018–2022) ===
On 27 August 2018, Bakht was inducted into the provincial Punjab cabinet of Chief Minister Usman Buzdar and was appointed Provincial Minister of Punjab for Finance. During his tenure as Provincial Minister of Punjab for Finance, he introduced budgets and financial legislation advocating for development in sectors of Punjab alongside Chief Minister Usman Buzdar and the PTI-led government.

==== 2019-20 Budget ====
In June 2019, Bakht presented the provincial budget of Punjab worth Rs. 2.36 trillion focusing on South Punjab's development. The budget included a total outlay of Rs. 2.36 trillion for the fiscal year 2019-20 and a tax collection target of Rs. 388.4 billion. Of the total budget, an amount of Rs. 350 billion was earmarked for development, while Rs. 1,298.80 billion was allocated for total expenditures. Out of the total development budget, 35% was allocated for South Punjab, an area of concern for development.

==== 2020-21 Budget ====
Bakht announced the 2020-21 budget in a June 2020 speech. The budget, worth Rs. 2240 billion, allocated Rs. 391 billion for the education sector. The main sectors focused on in the budget were education, health and employment generation. Rs. 97.66 billion were allocated for the social sector and Rs. 77.86 billion rupees for infrastructure development. "The provincial tax collection record an increase of 13 percent, whereas, Rs. 144 billion were distributed among the needy under the Ehsaas Program," said Bakht.

=== Recent career ===
He ran for a seat in the National Assembly of Pakistan from NA-171 Rahim Yar Khan-III as an Independent candidate in the 2024 Pakistani general election, but failed to win the seat as he became the runner-up to the PTI-backed Mumtaz Mustafa.
