= Bhong Mosque =

Mosque in Bhong, Punjab, Pakistan

- بھونگ مسجد
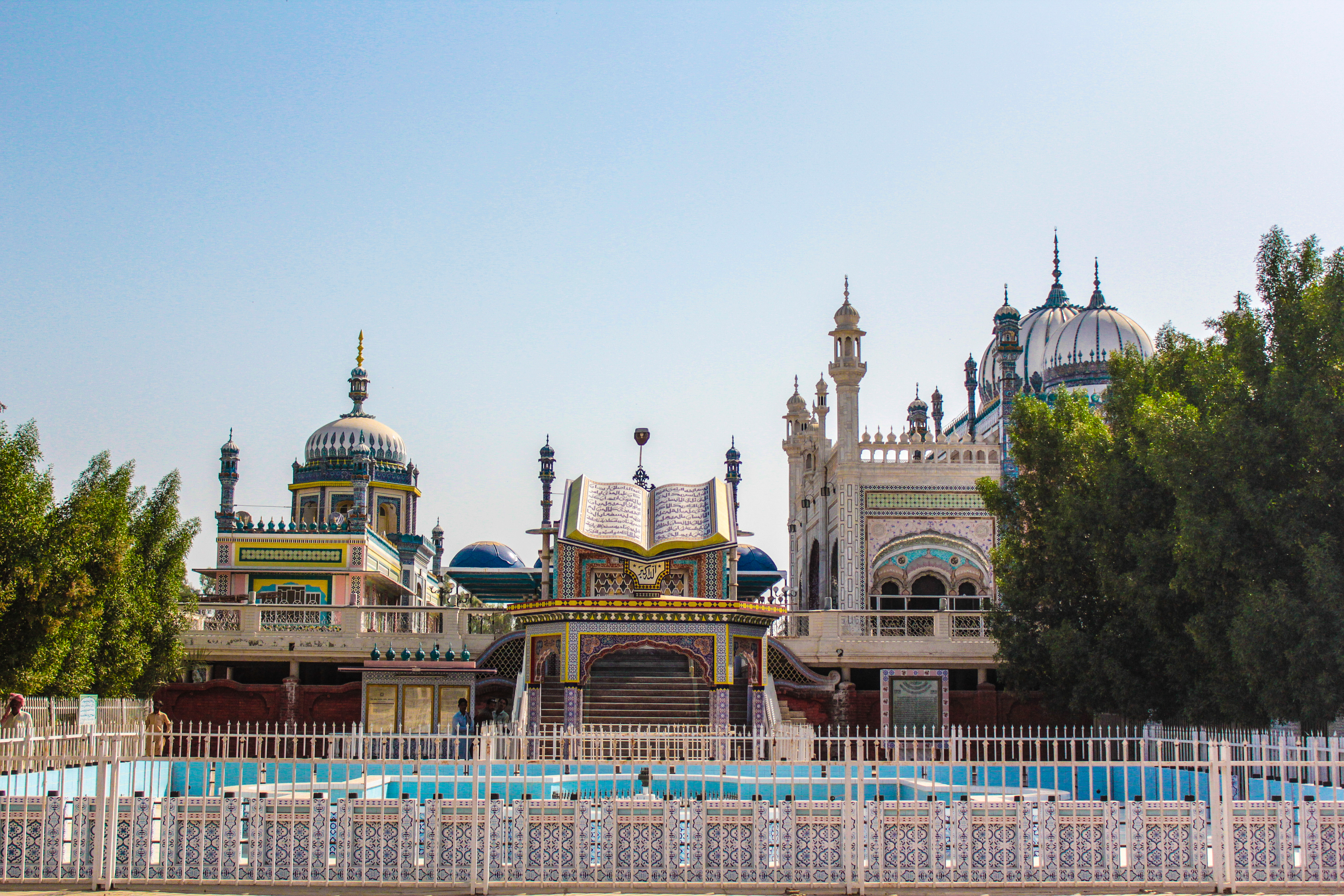

- Pakistan

Religion
- Affiliation: Islam
- Branch/tradition: Sunni

Location
- Location: Bhong, Rahim Yar Khan, Punjab, Pakistan
- Interactive map of Bhong Mosque
- Coordinates: 28°25′23″N 69°54′41″E

Architecture
- Type: mosque
- Groundbreaking: 1932
- Completed: 1982

Bhong Mosque (Urdu: بھونگ مسجد) is a mosque located in the village of Bhong, Rahim Yar Khan District, Punjab Province, Pakistan.

== History ==
It was designed and constructed over a period of nearly 50 years (from 1932 to 1982) and won the Aga Khan Award for Architecture in 1986.

== See also ==
- Aga Khan Award for Architecture
- Islam in Pakistan
- Religious architecture
