= Rahim Yar Khan Tehsil =

Tehsil in Rahim Yar Khan, Pakistan

Rahim Yar Khan Tehsil تحصیل رحیم یار خان
- Tehsil
- Tehsil Municipal Administration logo
- Country: Pakistan
- Province: (Punjab, Pakistan) Punjab
- District: Rahim Yar Khan

Government
  - Type: Tehsil Municipal Administration
  - Administrator: Syed Tariq Mahmood Bukhari
  - Municipal Officer: Sardar Naseer Ahmad

Area
  - Tehsil: 4,141 km^{2} (1,599 sq mi)
- Elevation: 3,463 m (11,362 ft)

Population (2023)
  - Tehsil: 1,778,542
  - Density: 429.5/km^{2} (1,112/sq mi)
  - Urban: 591,392 (33.25%)
  - Rural: 1,187,150 (66.75%)
- Time zone: UTC+5 (PST)
- Number of towns: 98
- Website: TMA Rahim Yar Khan

Rahim Yar Khan Tehsil (Urdu: تحصیل رحیم یار خان) is an administrative subdivision (tehsil) of Rahim Yar Khan District in the Punjab province of Pakistan.

== Demographics ==
Historical population
Year	Pop.	±% p.a.
1951	248,347	—
1961	323,393	+2.68%
1972	436,677	+2.77%
1981	575,283	+3.11%
1998	985,655	+3.22%
2017	1,530,183	+2.34%
2023	1,778,542	+2.54%

=== Population ===
At the time of the 2023 census, Rahim Yar Khan tehsil had a population of 1,778,542. Majority of the population are Muslims (94.5%). Hinduism is practised by 4.79 % of the population. Other minorities include Christians and Ahmadiyyas.
