= Sadiqabad, Punjab =

City in Punjab, Pakistan

Sadiqabad صادق آباد (Punjabi)
- City
- Location within Pakistan Location within Punjab, Pakistan
- Coordinates: 28°18′N 70°07′E
- Country: Pakistan
- Province: (Punjab, Pakistan) Punjab
- Division: Bahawalpur
- District: Rahim Yar Khan
- Tehsil: Sadiabad

Government
  - Type: Municipal Committee
  - Administrator: Salman Qayyum

Area
  - City: 30 km^{2} (12 sq mi)

Population (2023 census)
  - City: 274,210
  - Rank: 34th in Pakistan
  - Density: 9,100/km^{2} (24,000/sq mi)
- Time zone: UTC+5 (PST)
- Calling code: 068
- Date Established: 18 November 1948
- Postal Code: 64350

Sadiqabad (Punjabi/Urdu: صادق آباد) is a city and capital of Sadiqabad Tehsil in Rahim Yar Khan District, Punjab province of Pakistan.

It is situated at the border of Sindh and Punjab. According to the 2023 Pakistani census, it is the 32nd largest city of Pakistan with a population of 274,210.

== History ==
Sadiqabad, a Tehsil of Rahim Yar Khan district, is named after Sadeq Mohammad Khan V of Bahawalpur princely state. The new city Tehsil was inaugurated in 1948. It's the Pakistan's only and the World's 3rd city to celebrate its birthday on 18 November every year

== Historical Localities ==
=== Kacha Bhutta ===
The village of Kacha Bhutta in Sadiqabad Tehsil is recognized for its historical significance, being situated along the ancient, now-dry bed of the Hakra River. Historically, the village was home to a prominent landowning family, led by the late Sardar Malik Allah Yar Bhutto (d. 1982), which held over 2,000 acres of land. The family maintained deep-rooted ties with the Bhutto tribe leadership, including the late Sardar Peer Buksh Khan Bhutto, who was the Chief of the Bhutto tribe and a key political figure under the late Zulfikar Ali Bhutto. The family was renowned for hosting prestigious All-Pakistan Shooting Ball tournaments during the 1970s, which served as major social hubs frequented by prominent figures, including former Prime Minister Mir Zafarullah Khan Jamali, former senior ministers like Makhdoom Altaf Ahmed Qureshi, and high-ranking civil bureaucrats. Beyond politics, the family held significant social influence, maintaining close personal connections with legendary figures in the Pakistani film industry, such as actor Muhammad Ali. Due to their steadfast support for the Pakistan Peoples Party (PPP), they hosted Zulfikar Ali Bhutto at their residence, and later, Benazir Bhutto visited the village in 1986 upon the invitation of Malik Iqbal Bhutto (d. 1999). The family held a long-standing tradition of local governance, with both of Malik Allah Yar’s sons and his nephew, late Malik Iqbal Bhutto, serving as Union Council Chairmen. Following the passing of Malik Iqbal Bhutto, the family's consolidated role underwent a gradual transition, with their active political and social prominence shifting over the subsequent years.

== Notable people ==
- Asim Saleem Bajwa retired three-star general of the Pakistan Army, who served as Director General of the ISPR, Commander of the Southern Command, and later as Chairman of the CPEC Authority.
- Makhdoom Syed Mustafa Mehmood Member of the National Assembly under the PPP banner

== Demographics ==
Population

Historical population

| Year | Pop. | ±% p.a. |
|---|---|---|
| 1951 | 5,739 | — |
| 1961 | 16,007 | +10.80% |
| 1972 | 37,121 | +7.95% |
| 1981 | 63,935 | +6.23% |

| Year | Pop. | ±% p.a. |
|---|---|---|
| 1998 | 144,391 | +4.91% |
| 2017 | 239,677 | +2.70% |
| 2023 | 274,210 | +2.27% |

According to 2023 census, Sadiqabad had a population of 274,210.

Languages

Languages of Sadiqabad Tehsil (2023)
1. Saraiki (55.3%)
2. Punjabi (25.8%)
3. Sindhi (7.19%)
4. Balochi (4.23%)
5. Urdu (3.25%)
6. Hindko (1.67%)
7. Others (3.54%)

According to 2023 Pakistani census Sadiqabad tehsil had a population of 1,381,759 among which 55.3% spoke Saraiki, 25.8% Punjabi, 7.19% Sindhi, 4.23% Balochi, 3.25% Urdu, 1.67% Hindko and 3.54% other languages.

== See also ==
- State of Bahawalpur
