= Sadiqabad Tehsil =

Tehsil in Punjab, Pakistan

Sadiqabad Tehsil تحصیل صادق آباد
- Tehsil
- Tehsil Municipal Administration logo
- Country: Pakistan
- Province: (Punjab, Pakistan) Punjab
- District: Rahim Yar Khan

Government
  - Type: Tehsil Municipal Administration
  - Administrator: Shakil Ahmad Bhatti
  - Municipal Officer: Zargham Mehdi

Area
  - Tehsil: 2,548 km^{2} (984 sq mi)

Population (2023)
  - Tehsil: 1,381,759
  - Density: 542.3/km^{2} (1,405/sq mi)
  - Urban: 324,039 (23.45%)
  - Rural: 1,057,720 (76.55%)
- Time zone: UTC+5 (PST)

Sadiqabad (Urdu: تحصیل صادق آباد) is a tehsil located in Rahim Yar Khan District, Punjab province of Pakistan situated at the border of Sindh and Punjab. It is located on the east bank of the Indus River.

== Demographics ==
Historical population
Year	Pop.	±% p.a.
1951	163,073	—
1961	236,660	+3.79%
1972	331,504	+3.11%
1981	450,353	+3.46%
1998	772,548	+3.23%
2017	1,264,752	+2.63%
2023	1,381,759	+1.49%

=== Population ===
At the time of the 2023 census, Sadiqabad tehsil had a population of 1,381,759 people. Majority of the population are Muslims (96%). Hinduism is practised by 3.46 % of the population. Other minorities include Christians and Ahmadiyyas.

== See also ==
- Krishna Temple, Sadiqabad
