= Rahim Yar Khan District =

District in Punjab, Pakistan

Rahim Yar Khan District ضلع رحیم یار خاں
- District of Punjab
- Rahim Yar Khan
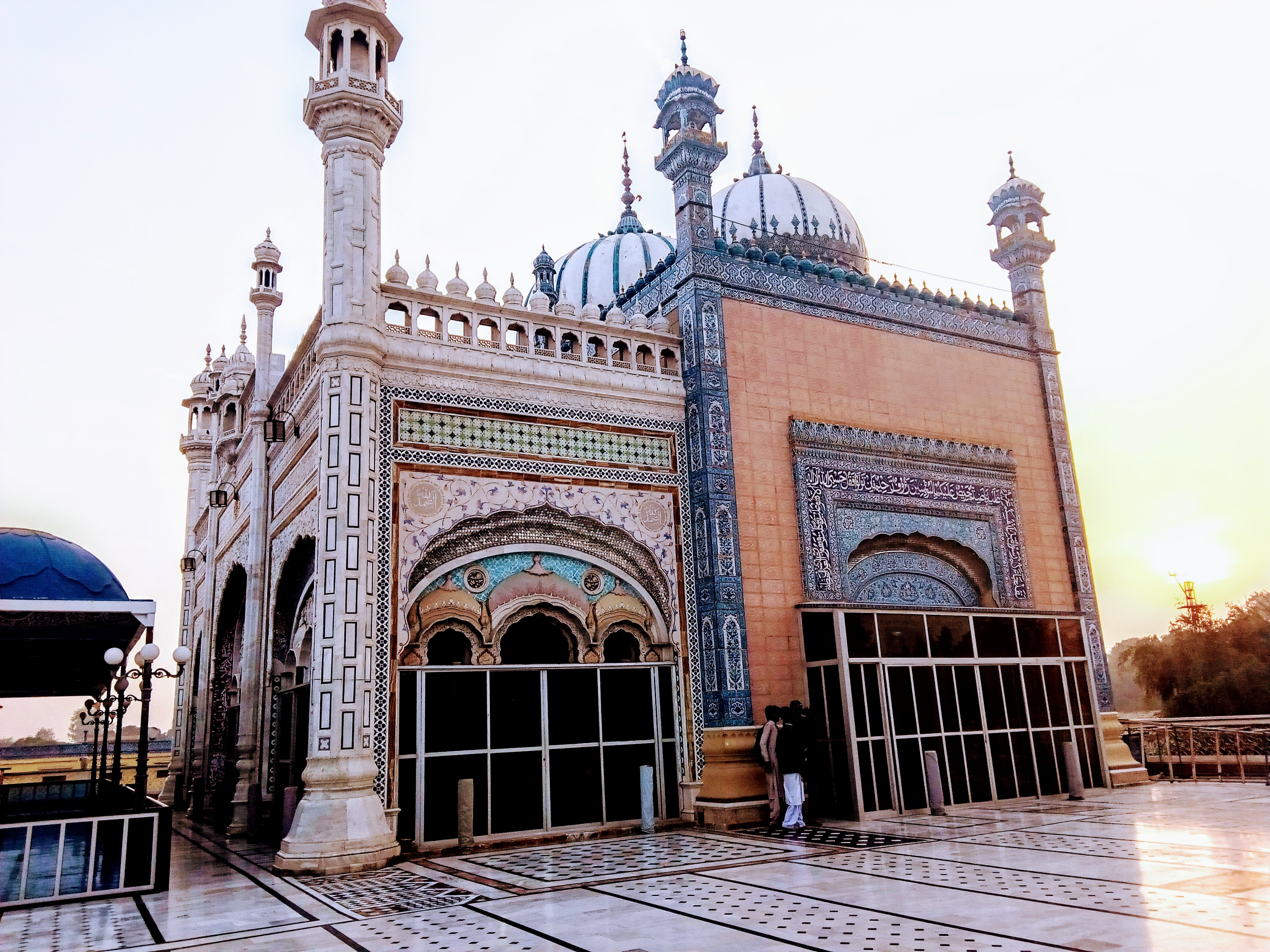
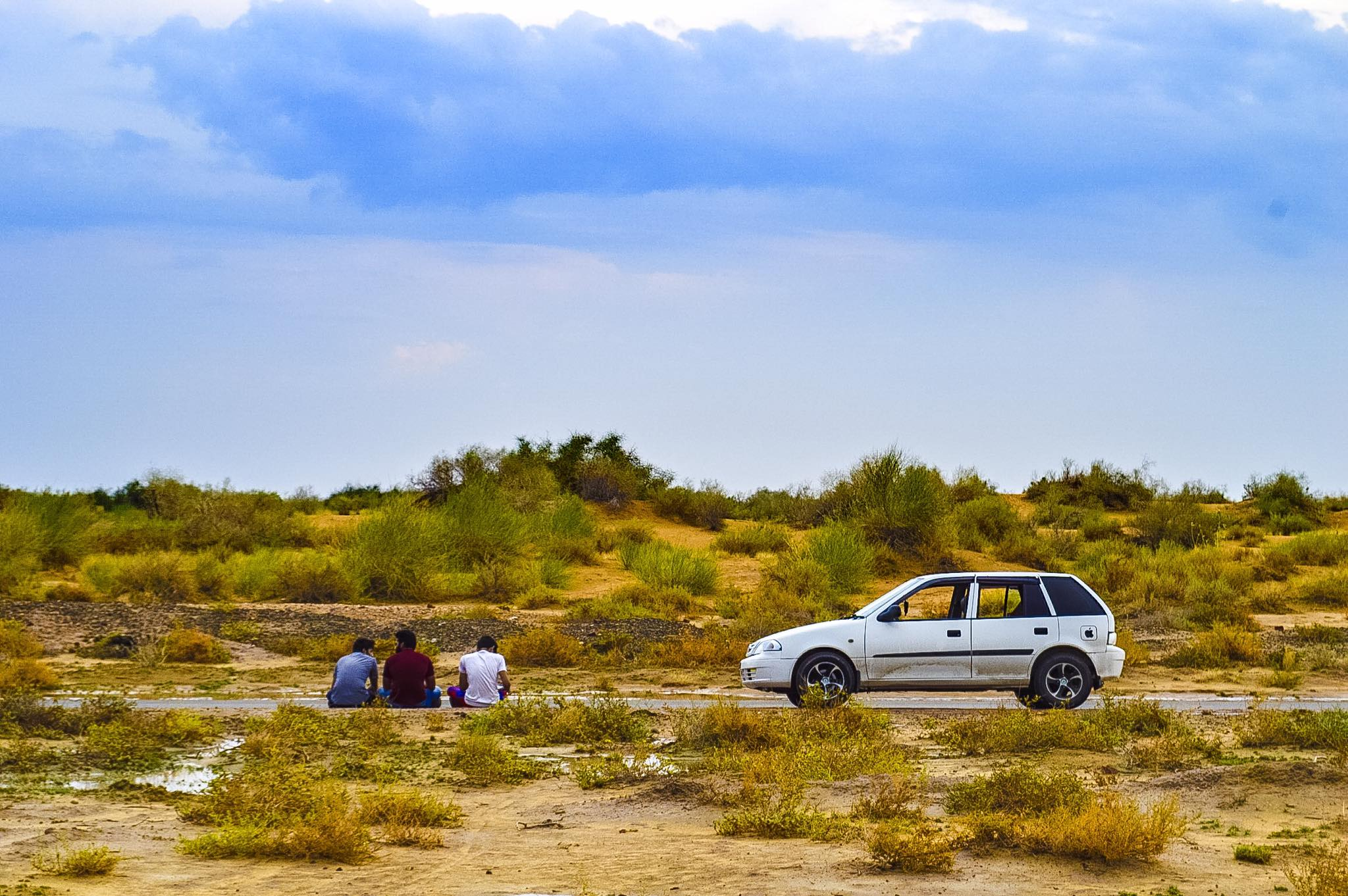
- Top: Bhong Masjid; Bottom: Cholistan Desert

- Map of Rahim Yar Khan district is highlighted in red
- Coordinates: 28°25′12″N 70°18′00″E
- Country: Pakistan
- Province: Punjab
- Division: Bahawalpur
- Founder: Nawab of Bahawalpur
- Headquarters: Rahim Yar Khan
- Tehsils: 4

Government
  - Type: District Administration
  - Deputy Commissioner: Shakeel Ahmad Bhatti

Area
  - District of Punjab: 11,880 km^{2} (4,590 sq mi)

Population (2023)
  - District of Punjab: 5,564,703
  - Density: 468.4/km^{2} (1,213/sq mi)
  - Urban: 1,342,252
  - Rural: 4,222,451
  - Gender ratio: 60.2 male / 39.8 female

Literacy
  - Literacy rate: Total: (47.94%); Male: (55.14%); Female: (40.15%)
- Time zone: UTC+5 (PST)
- Area code: 068
- Website: rykhan.punjab.gov.pk

Rahim Yar Khan District (Urdu: ضلع رحیم یار خان, Punjabi: ضلع رحیم یار خان) is a district in the province of Punjab, Pakistan. Its headquarters is the city of Rahim Yar Khan.

== Administrative ==
The district of Rahim Yar Khan is subdivided into four tehsils:

Tehsil	Area (km^{2})	Pop. (2023)	Density (ppl/km^{2}) (2023)	Literacy rate (2023)	Union Councils
Khanpur Katora	3,190	1,169,138	366.50	50.08%	29
Liaqatpur	3,262	1,235,264	378.68	38.35%	37
Rahim Yar Khan	2,464	1,978,542	721.81	69.66%	49
Sadiqabad	2,964	1,381,759	466.18	47.04%	34

== History ==
The entire district was a part of the Bahawalpur State before partition. Rahim Yar Khan has had the status of a separate district since 1943. The district derives its name from its headquarters, the city of Rahim Yar Khan, which was known as "Naushehra" until 1881. To avoid confusion with the similarly named city of Nowshera, the ruler of Bahawalpur, Nawab Sadiq Khan IV, renamed it after his first son, Rahim Yar Khan.

== Geography ==
The district lies between 27°40'-29°16' north latitudes and 60°45'-70°01' east longitudes. The riverain area of the district lies close to eastern bank of the river Indus and Panjnad. Rahim Yar Khan District is bounded on the north by Muzaffargarh District, on the east by Bahawalpur District, on the south by Jaisalmer district (India) and Ghotki District of Sindh province, and on the west by Rajanpur District. It also has two enclaves within Sindh, Kharor and Machka, bordered by Ghotki District and Kashmore District.

This district is divided into three main physical features: (a) Riverside area, b) canal-irrigated area, and (c) desert area which is called Cholistan. The Riverside area of the district lies close on the southern side of the Indus river mainly falling in the river bed. The canal-irrigated area lies on the south and is separated by main Minchan Bund. The approximate height of the irrigated area is 150 to 200 meters (490 to 655 ft) above sea level. The third part of the area, called Cholistan, lies in the south of the irrigated tract up to the Indo-Pak border. The surface of the desert consists of a succession of sand dunes rising at places to a height of 150 meters (492 ft) and is covered with the vegetation peculiar to sandy tracts.

== Demographics ==
Historical population
Year	Pop.	±% p.a.
1951	664,234	—
1961	1,015,715	+4.34%
1972	1,398,879	+2.95%
1981	1,841,451	+3.10%
1998	3,141,053	+3.19%
2017	4,807,762	+2.27%
2023	5,564,703	+2.47%

As of the 2023 census, Rahim Yar Khan district has 826,942 households and a population of 5,564,703. The district has a sex ratio of 108.60 males to 100 females and a literacy rate of 47.94%: 55.14% for males and 40.15% for females. 1,684,241 (30.28% of the surveyed population) are under 10 years of age. 1,342,252 (24.12%) live in urban areas.

=== Religion ===
Religion in Rahim Yar Khan district (2023)
Religion	Percent
Islam	96.27%
Hinduism	3.17%
Christianity	0.49%
Other or not stated	0.07%

Muslims were the predominant religious community with 96.11% of the population while Hindus were 3.17% of the population. The district has the highest Hindu population in the Punjab province The Bhagwan Shri Krishna Mandir in Sadiqabad is one of the main Hindu temples in Rahim Yar Khan district. Other minorities like Christians, Ahmadi etc. are very small in number. The proportion of population of Muslims is higher in urban than rural areas.

Religion in Rahim Yar Khan District
Religion	2017		2023	
Religion	Pop.	%	Pop.	%
Islam	4,639,554	96.50%	5,354,426	96.27%
Hinduism	150,093	3.12%	176,416	3.17%
Christianity	14,205	0.30%	27,057	0.49%
Ahmadi	998	0.02%	779	0.01%
Others (Note: Including Jainism, Buddhism, Zoroastrianism, Judaism, Sikhism or not stated)	2,912	0.06%	3,042	0.06%
Total Population	4,807,762	100%	5,561,720	100%

=== Languages ===
Languages of Rahim Yar Khan district (2023)
1. Saraiki (64.9%)
2. Punjabi (23.9%)
3. Urdu (2.93%)
4. Sindhi (2.54%)
5. Balochi (1.63%)
6. Hindko (1.38%)
7. Others (2.68%)

At the time of the 2023 census, 64.92% of the population spoke Saraiki, 23.92% Punjabi, 2.93% Urdu, 2.54% Sindhi, 1.63% Balochi, and 1.38% Hindko as their first language. 1.72% of the population recorded their language under 'Others'.

The local dialect belongs to the southern dialect group of Saraiki. Other languages spoken are Bagri/Cholistani and Haryanvi.

== Education ==
The literacy rate in the district is 98% total for the 1st grade level school, locally known as 'graduating the MA full Examination'. Regarding medical education, there is Sheikh Zaid medical college affiliated with Sheikh Zaid hospital. The top ranked universities in Punjab, Khawaja Fareed University of Engineering and Information Technology and Islamia University of Bahawalpur Rahim Yar Khan Government Pilot School Khawaja Fareed Government College Campus are also located in Rahim Yar Khan District.

== Health ==
Following hospitals are operating in Rahim Yar Khan District:

Name	Type	Established	Beds
DHQ Hospital, Rahim Yar Khan	Public		
Shaikh Zayed Medical College and Hospital, Rahim Yar Khan	Public	2003	

== Sugarcane ==
Rahim Yar Khan District has recently embraced growing sugarcane. The area under cultivation of sugarcane increased to 430,000 acres in 2020 from 310,000 acres in 2014–15. Six sugar mills are located in the district.

== Notable people ==
- Makhdoom Altaf Ahmed, former Provincial Minister (Punjab) Finance & Excise and Taxation.
- Begum Ishrat Ashraf, a famous Pakistani politician
- Aima Baig, Popular singer
- Asim Saleem Bajwa, Pakistani three star general who was the director-general of the Inter-Services Public Relations
- Makhdoom Hashim Jawan Bakht politician who is the current Finance Minister of Punjab
- Khusro Bakhtiar, Member Profile, National Assembly of Pakistan, politician who currently serves as the Federal Minister of National Food Security and Research.
- Talha Chahour, Actor
- Rais Muhammad Iqbal, former Provincial Minister (Punjab) for Mines and Mineral Affairs
- AVM (Rtd) Mushtaq Laghari, former ambassador to UAE
- Muniba Mazari, motivational speaker
- Makhdoom Ahmed Mehmood elected member of the Punjab and National Assemblies
- Ahmed Raza, first class cricketer
- Makhdoom Shahabuddin, Former Federal Minister of Pakistan for Textiles

== Neighbourhoods ==
Many major Towns and villages are located in the District Rahim Yar Khan. Some notables are listed below.

- Allah Abad, Rahim Yar Khan
- Bhong Masjid
- Fateh Pur
- Firoza
- Iqbalabad
- Khanpur Katora
- Kot Sabzal
- Liaquatpur
- Mian Wali Qureshian
- Patan minara
- Rahim Yar Khan
- Sadiqabad
- Zāhir Pīr

== See also ==
- Shaikh Zayed International Airport
- 2021 Bhong temple attack
