= Saraiki =

Saraiki, Siraiki or Seraiki may refer to:

== Relating to Pakistan ==
- Saraiki language, an Indo-Aryan language of central Pakistan
- Saraiki people, an ethnolinguistic group of central Pakistan

== Places ==
- Saraiki, Russia, a village in Vorotynsky District, Russia
- Saraiķi, a village in Pāvilosta Municipality, Latvia
- Siraki, a village in Iran

== See also ==
- Saraik, a district in Afghanistan
- Saraiki culture, the culture of the Saraiki people of Pakistan
- Saraiki diaspora, Saraiki people of Pakistan dispersed around the world
- Saraiki literature, the literature of Saraiki people of Pakistan
- Saraiki music, music of Saraiki people of Pakistan
- Saraikistan, a geographical region and a proposed province in Pakistan
- Siraiki (Sindhi dialect), also known as Siroli, a dialect of the Sindhi language of southeastern Pakistan
