= Saraiki diaspora =

Saraiki
سرائیکی پنجابی ਸਰਾਇਕੀ ਪੰਜਾਬੀ

Languages
- Saraiki, Urdu, Hindi, Punjabi

Religion
- Predominately: Islam, Hinduism, Minority: Sikhism

The Saraiki diaspora consists of the descendants of ethnic Saraikis who emigrated out of South Punjab, also known as Saraikistan, to other areas of the world.

== Regions ==
=== India ===
According to the Indian census of 2001, Saraiki is spoken in urban areas throughout northwest and north central India, mainly by the descendants of migrants from western Punjab after the Partition of India in 1947. Out of these, 56,096 persons report their dialect as Mūltānī and by 11,873 individuals report their dialect as Bahāwalpurī. One dialects of Saraiki that is spoken by Indian Saraikis is Derawali, spoken by Derawals in Derawal Nagar, Delhi who migrated to India during the partition. Other dialects spoken by Indian Saraikis include Jafri, Saraiki Hindki, Jhangi, Thali, and Jatki. Many Sairaiki-origin people (whose ancestors once lived in British India) form a distinguished group of doctors, engineers, fashion designers, IT professionals. Some of these people no longer speak the Saraiki language, and have majorly diluted into speaking Punjabi or Hindi.

== See also ==
- Saraikistan
- Saraiki people
- List of Saraiki people
- Saraiki culture
- Saraiki cuisine
- Saraiki literature
- Pakistani diaspora
- Pakistanis in Saudi Arabia
