= Saraiki ajrak =

Block-printed textile tradition of southern Punjab associated with Saraiki culture

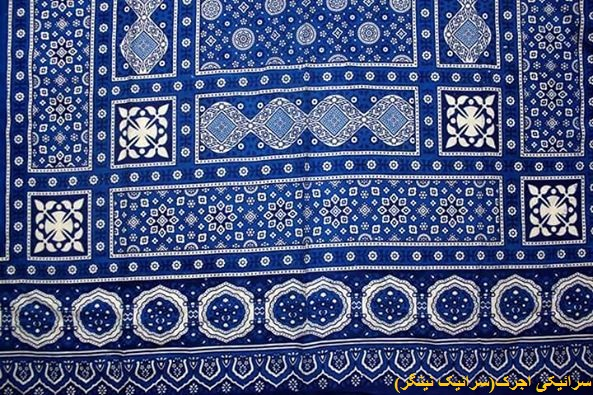
Traditional Saraiki ajrak

Saraiki ajrak (Saraiki: سرائیکی اجرک), is a form of block-printed textile traditionally worn in the Saraiki-speaking regions of southern Punjab, Pakistan. It is part of the wider ajrak-style textile tradition historically associated with the Indus River basin, a region that was home to the ancient Indus Valley civilisation. In contemporary usage, ajrak has become a cultural symbol of Saraiki culture and identity, particularly during events such as Saraiki Culture Day and Saraiki Ajrak Day.

== Description ==
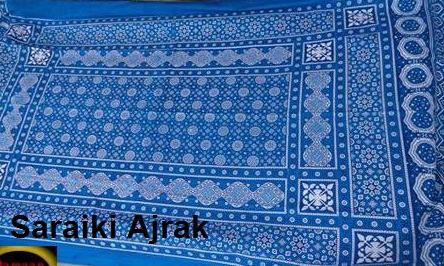
Saraiki Ajrak

Saraiki ajrak refers to the use of ajrak-style, block-printed shawls in the Saraiki-speaking regions of southern Punjab, Pakistan. The term is used in contemporary cultural contexts and is commonly associated with events such as Saraiki Ajrak Day and Saraiki Culture Day, during which participants wear dark blue ajrak-style shawls as a symbol of regional culture and identity.

The broader tradition of ajrak is a long-established form of block-printed textile with deep historical roots in Sindh and adjoining regions of the Indus Valley, where it has been produced and worn for generations.

These shawls display geometric designs and patterns produced using block printing with wooden stamps. Common colours used in ajrak patterns include blue, red, black, and green. In contemporary Saraiki cultural usage, ajrak-style shawls are often associated with blue or cyan colour schemes, which are commonly featured during regional cultural events.

== See also ==
- Saraiki shalwar suits
- Saraiki literature
- Ajrak
- Saraiki people
