= Saraiki cuisine =

Culinary traditions of Saraiki region, Pakistan

Saraiki cuisine (Saraiki: سرائیکی کھاݨیں) refers to the native cuisine of the Saraiki people in South Punjab. It is one of the key parts of the Pakistani and South Asian cuisines. Saraiki food comprises many unique local dishes, and also shares influences with neighbouring regional cuisines. The cities of Multan and Tonsa are the two main hubs of Saraiki cooking.

== Dishes ==
Curry dishes

Curry is referred to as bhaji in Saraiki, whether vegetables, meat, or mixed, which is different than nomenclature in some other South Asian cuisines. Curries made from the flower buds of moringa (locally known as sohanjrra'n) and jachnar are considered specialities of the region.

Sohbat is a food of the Saraiki belts of Khyber Pakhtunkhwa, Pakistan and south Punjab, Pakistan. It is the traditional dish of Damaan and other Saraiki belts of Bhakkar, Layyah, Tonsa, Vehoa, and Dera Ghazi Khan.

Rice dishes

Rice dishes are made in different styles across the Southern Punjab areas. Pulao, bhat (particularly dal bhat made with rice and lentils), and Cholistani-style pulao, made from camel meat, are examples.

Grills

Multani chaamp consists of spiced, skewered lamb chops grilled over charcoal.

Sajji is a speciality of the region, particularly in the Sulaiman Mountains region of Southern Punjab.

Snacks

Samosa, pakorra, corn on the cob, dahi bhallay, gol gappay and boiled potatoes mixed with yogurt are common snacks.

Desserts

Sohan halwa is a traditional specialty of southern Punjab, particularly Multan, such as Hafiz sohan halwa. This halwa dessert is prepared by boiling a mixture of water, sugar, milk and cornflour until solidified. Saffron is used for flavoring while ghee is used to prevent it from sticking to the pan. Almonds, pistachios and cardamom seeds may be added. Dera Ghazi Khan, Bahawalpur, Uch Sharif and Mailsi are also known for their sohan halwa products.

Kulfi, falooda, locally made rose-flavoured ice cream, and gola are commonly eaten during summer.

Sweet rice cooked with jaggery, known as gurr ala bhat or gurr walay chaawal, is a common household dessert. Zarda rice is common for special occasions and festivals. Pakistani desserts and sweets common in the region include siwayyan, gulab jaman, barfi, firni, kheer, and ras malai.

Malpura, kachori, and katlama are common breakfast items usually eaten with suji halwa.

Traditional drinks

Thandai is particularly popular in summer.

Traditional fruits

Mango is a summer fruit of the region. Other traditional fruits include dates, jamun, shahtoot, falsa, banana, and guava.

== Gallery ==
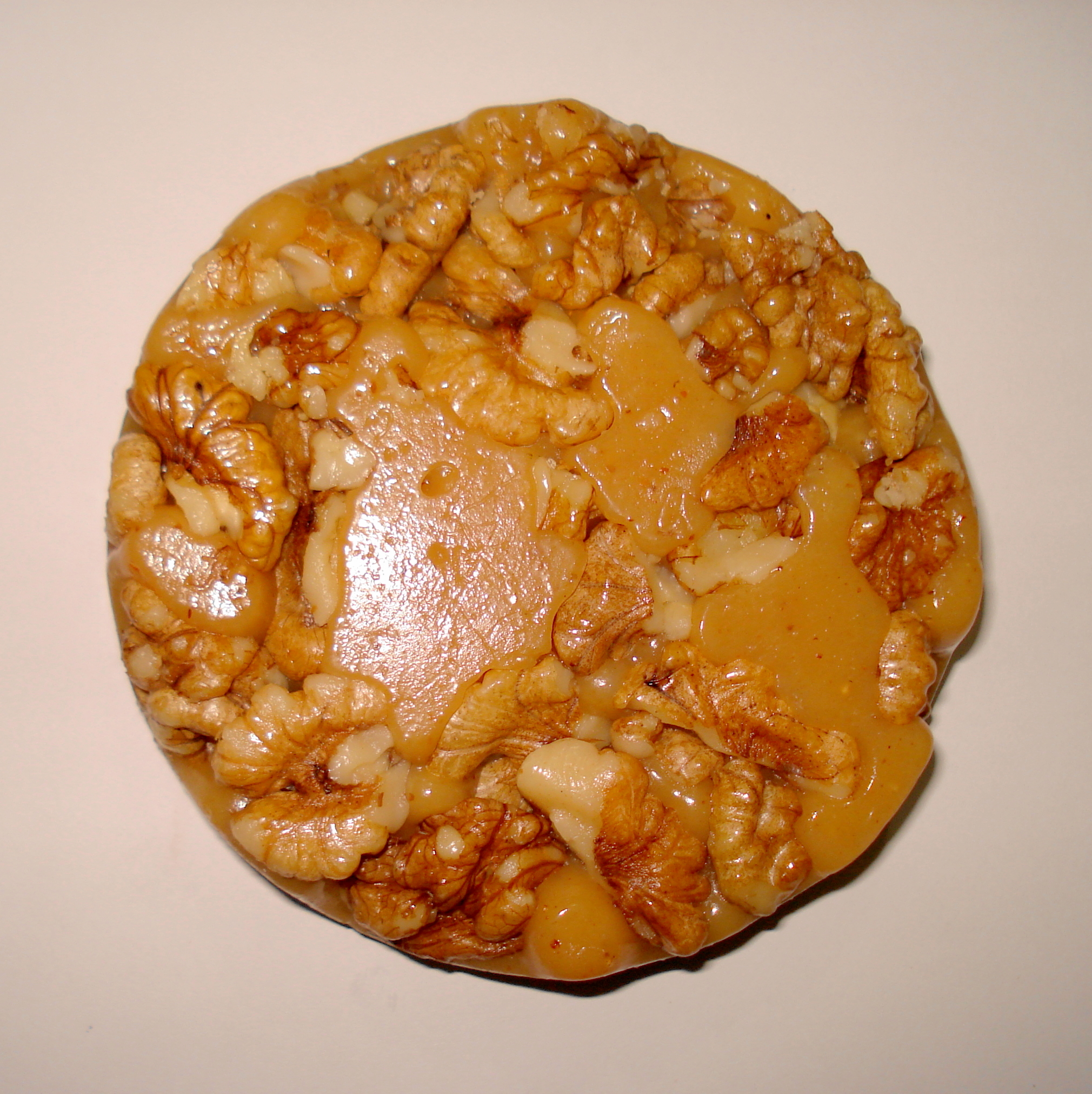
Multani-style sohan halwa

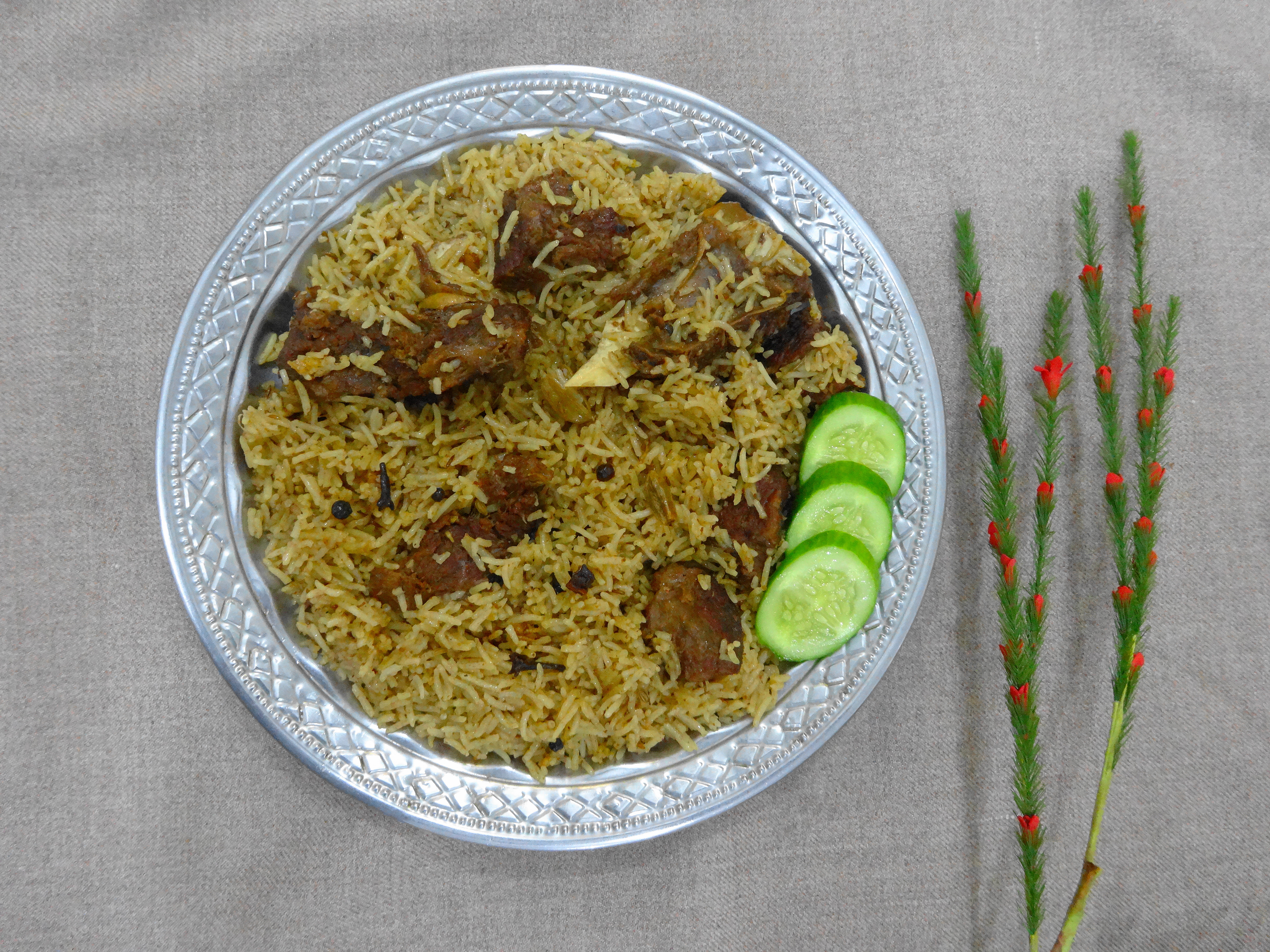
Cholistani-style pulao, made from camel meat

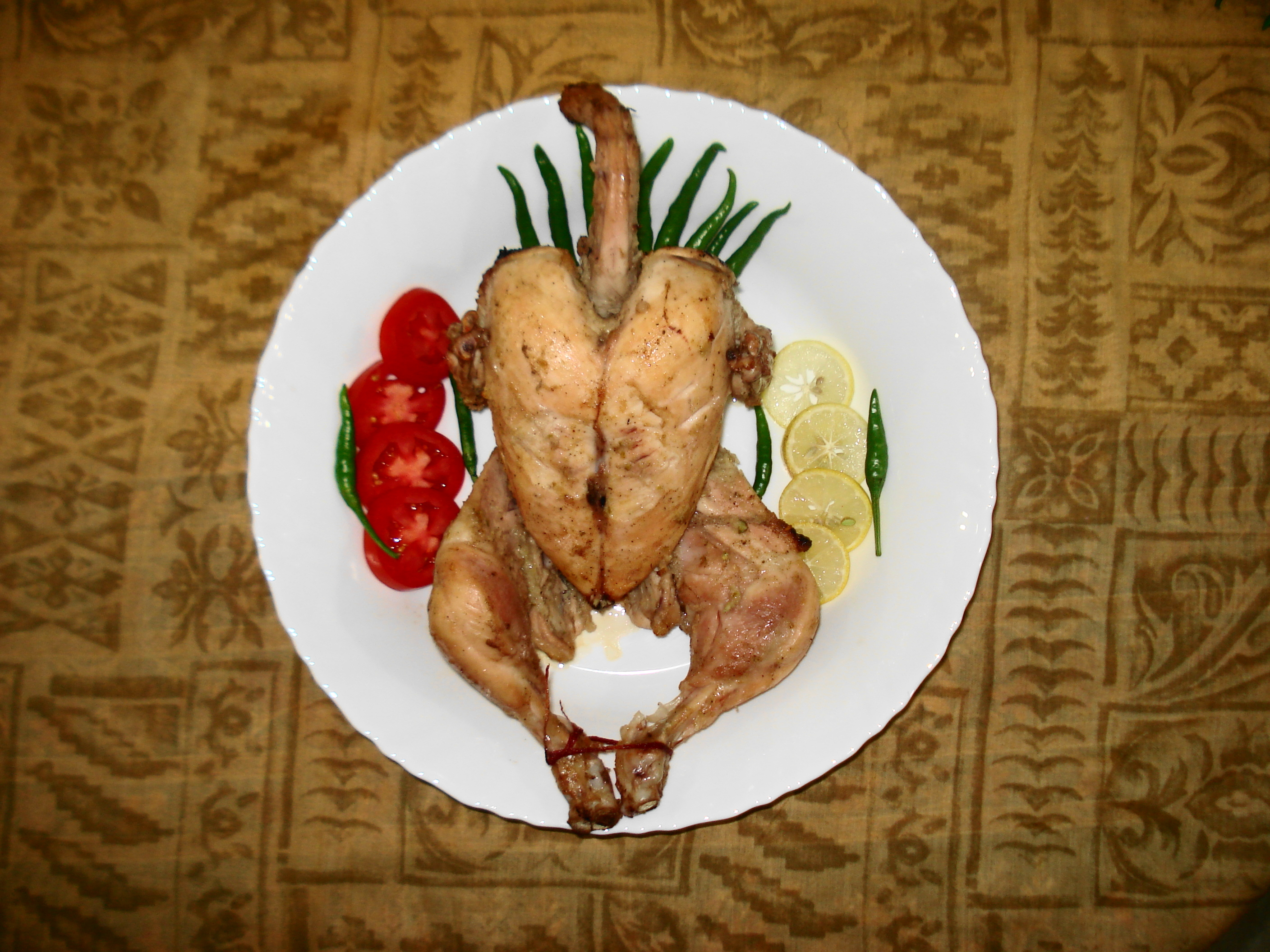
Sajji, a popular dish in southern Punjab

== See also ==
- Saraikistan
- Saraiki people
- List of Saraiki people
- Saraiki culture
- Saraiki literature
- Saraiki diaspora
