= Saraiki people =

Multi-ethnic group in Pakistan

Saraikis
سرائیکی
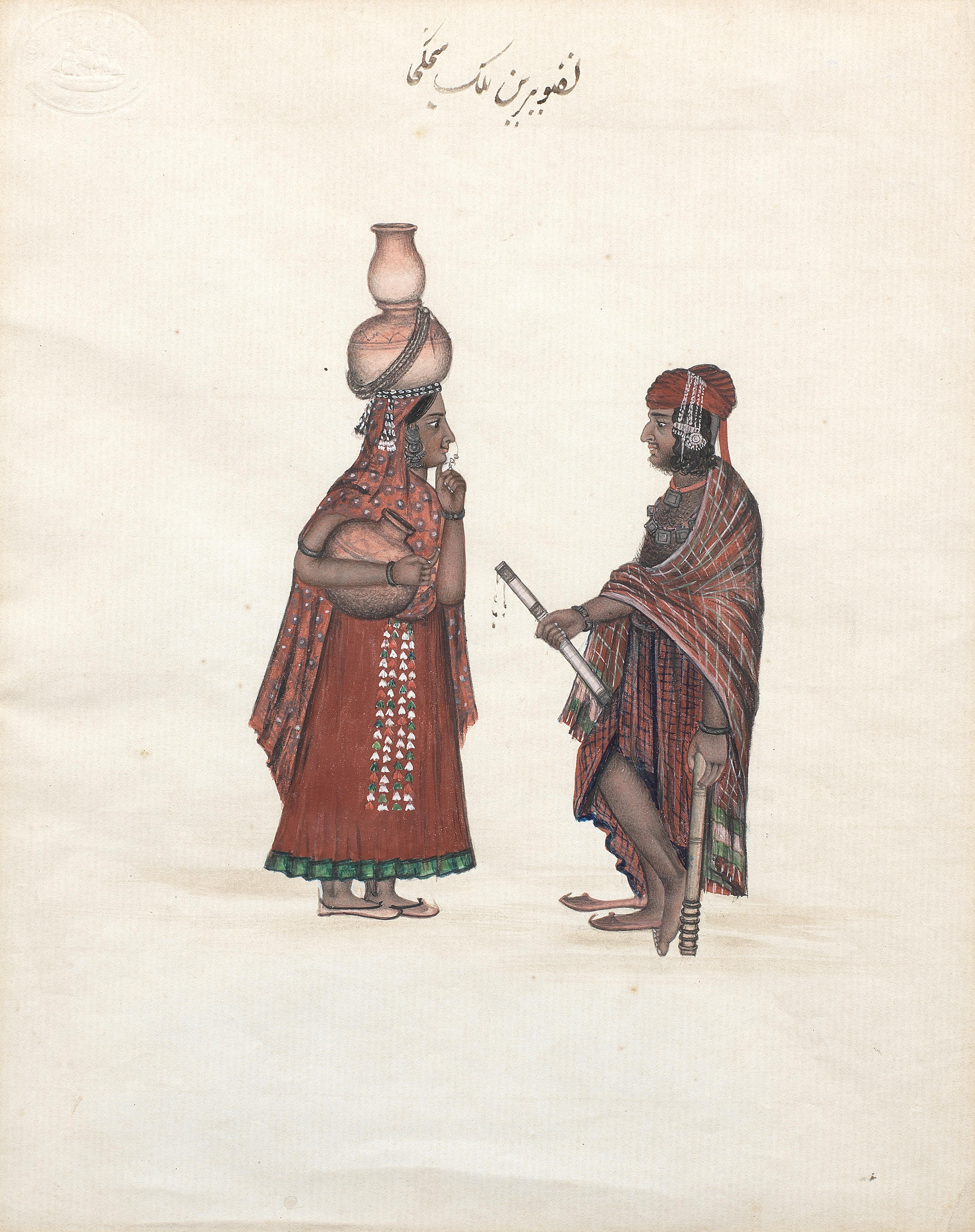
- Painting of Saraikis (or Seraikis) from a series of twelve paintings, ca.1850

Total population
- c. 20 million

Regions with significant populations
- Pakistan: 20,324,637

Languages
- Saraiki

Religion
- Islam; Hinduism; Sikhism

The Saraikis (Saraiki: سرائیکی) are a group of Indo-Aryan communities native to central Pakistan, primarily identifying with Saraiki language and a shared regional identity.

Mostly inhabiting southern Punjab and northern Sindh, as well as most of Derajat, located where southwestern Punjab, southeastern Khyber Pakhtunkhwa, and northeastern Balochistan meet, the Saraiki regional identity arose in the 1960s, separating itself from the broader Punjabi ethnic identity; this was a result of a political movement, arising in 1962, to separate the Derawali, Multani and Riasti dialects from the Punjabi language, and to instead declare them to constitute a separate language for which the term Saraiki was adopted, hitherto only used for a Sindhi dialect spoken in northern Sindh.

The Saraikis follow several religions, though most are predominantly followers of Sunni Islam. A small minority of Saraikis follows Christianity in Pakistan. There used to be a large Hindu and Sikh minority, however majority of them migrated to India after Partition of India in 1947. These Hindus and Sikhs now have assimilated into larger Punjabi-speaking and Hindi-speaking populations.

== Etymology ==
The present extent of the meaning of Sirāikī is a recent development, and the term most probably gained its currency during the nationalist movement of the 1960s. It has been in use for much longer in Sindh to refer to the speech of the immigrants from the north, principally Siraiki-speaking Baloch tribes who settled there between the 16th and the 19th centuries. In this context, the term can most plausibly be explained as originally having had the meaning "the language of the north", from the Sindhi word siro 'up-river, north'. This name can ambiguously refer to the northern dialects of Sindhi, but these are nowadays more commonly known as "Siroli" or "Sireli".

An alternative hypothesis is that Sarākī originated in the word sauvīrā, or Sauvira, an ancient kingdom which was also mentioned in the Sanskrit epic Mahabharata.

Currently, the most common rendering of the term is Saraiki. (Note: Saraiki is the spelling used in universities of Pakistan (the Islamia University of Bahawalpur, department of Saraiki established in 1989, Bahauddin Zakariya University, in Multan, department of Saraiki established in 2006, and Allama Iqbal Open University, in Islamabad, department of Pakistani languages established in 1998), and by the district governments of Bahawalpur and Multan, as well as by the federal institutions of the Government of Pakistan like Population Census Organization and Pakistan Broadcasting Corporation.) However, Seraiki and Siraiki are also commonly used.

== See also ==
- History of Multan
- Saraiki cuisine
- Saraiki literature
- Saraiki diaspora
- South Punjab Province movement
- Saraiki culture

== Sources ==
- Dani, A.H. (1981). "Sindhu – Sauvira : A glimpse into the early history of Sind". In Khuhro, Hamida (ed.). Sind through the centuries : proceedings of an international seminar held in Karachi in Spring 1975. Karachi: Oxford University Press. pp. 35–42. ISBN 978-0-19-577250-0.
- Lewis, M. Paul; Simons, Gary F.; Fennig, Charles D., eds. (2016). "Saraiki". Ethnologue (19 ed.). Archived from the original on 25 April 2019.
- Masica, Colin P. (1991). The Indo-Aryan languages. Cambridge language surveys. Cambridge University Press. ISBN 978-0-521-23420-7.
- Rahman, Tariq (1995). "The Siraiki Movement in Pakistan". Language Problems & Language Planning. 19 (1): 1–25. doi:10.1075/lplp.19.1.01rah.
- Shackle, Christopher (1976). The Siraiki language of central Pakistan : a reference grammar. London: School of Oriental and African Studies.
- —— (1977). "Siraiki: A Language Movement in Pakistan". Modern Asian Studies. 11 (3): 379–403. doi:10.1017/s0026749x00014190. ISSN 0026-749X. JSTOR 311504. S2CID 144829301.
- Shackle, Christopher (2003). "Panjabi". In George Cardona; Dhanesh Jain (eds.). The Indo-Aryan languages. Routledge language family series. Y. London: Routledge. pp. 581–621. ISBN 978-0-7007-1130-7.
- —— (2007). "Pakistan". In Simpson, Andrew (ed.). Language and national identity in Asia. Oxford linguistics Y. Oxford University Press. ISBN 978-0-19-922648-1.
