= Hafizkhel =

Sub-tribe of the Gandapur tribe in Pakistan

Hafiz Khel (Pashto: حافظ خېل ) is a sub-tribe of the Gandapur tribe. The tribe was historically nomadic primarily lived in Afghanistan and Pakistan. Over time, about 80–85% have migrated to and settled in Pakistan, particularly the Dera Ismail Khan and Tank Districts of Khyber Pakhtunkhwa Province and Zhob province of Baluchistan.

== Language ==
The Hafiz Khel are bilingual. Members living in Zhob and Tank speak Pashto. However, those Living in Dera Ismail Khan and Kulachi have not retained their ancestral language and mostly speak the Derawali form of Saraiki dialect, which is influenced by Pashto and Seraiki. Like other Pashtun tribes, they generally observe a pre-Islamic honor code formally known as Pashtunwali.
