= Saraiki culture =

Culture of the Saraiki people

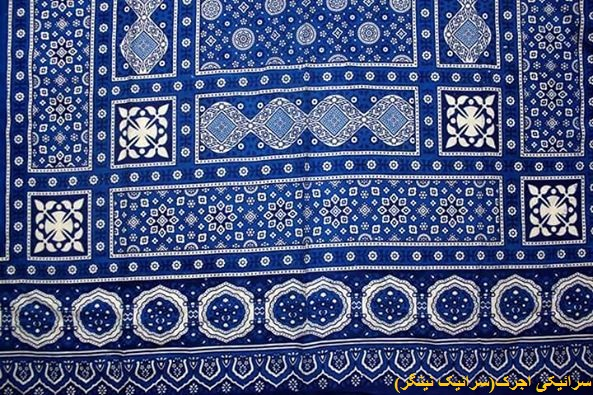
Saraiki Sajarak symbol of the saraiki culture and traditions

Saraiki culture is the culture of the Saraiki people, residing in Pakistan and outside Pakistan.

== Clothing ==
The traditional dress of Saraiki People is the Shalwar kameez; This is also the national dress of Pakistan. Traditional Sajarak is an important part of Saraiki male and female dress.

== Cuisine ==
Mango is a seasonal fruit of the region during summers. Sohan halwa is a traditional speciality of southern Punjab, particularly Multan. The southern Punjab cities of Dera Ghazi Khan, Bahawalpur, Uch Sharif and Mailsi are also known for their sohan halwa products. Multani Chaamp is a meat dish consisting of lamb chops prepared with various flavours and spices, placed on sewers and grilled over charcoal.

== Religion ==
The region of Saraikistan is renowned for its Sufi heritage. The city of Multan is known as the city of saints. It has the shrines of Baha-ud-din Zakariya, Shah Rukn-e-Alam and Shah Yousef Gardez. Similarly, Uch Sharif has been the centre of Qadiriyya Sufi order.

== Art and music ==
=== Jhumar ===
Jhumar or Jhoomar (also called Ghumbar in Sandalbar area) is a traditional Saraiki and Baloch dance in Pakistan. It is also popular in the Sandalbar areas of Punjab. It is slower and more rhythmic form. The word "Jhumar" comes from Jhum/Jhoom, which means Swaying. Jhumar is performed at the wedding ceremonies usually. The dance is also performed in circle, to the tune of emotional songs. Ataullah Khan Esakhelvi and Shafaullah Rokhri are considered the main singers of Saraiki music.

=== Literature ===
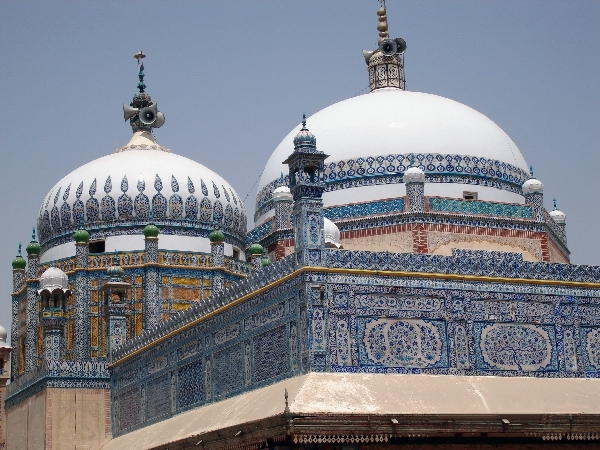
Tomb of Sufi poet Khwaja Ghulam Farid

The language, partly codified during the British Raj, derived its emotional attraction from the poetry of the Sufi saint, Khawaja Ghulam Farid, who has become an identity symbol. His poems, known as Kafi are still famous.

Shakir Shujabadi (Kalam-e-Shakir, Khuda Janey, Shakir Diyan Ghazlan, Peelay Patr, Munafqan Tu Khuda Bachaway, and Shakir De Dohray are his famous books) is a very well recognized modern poet.

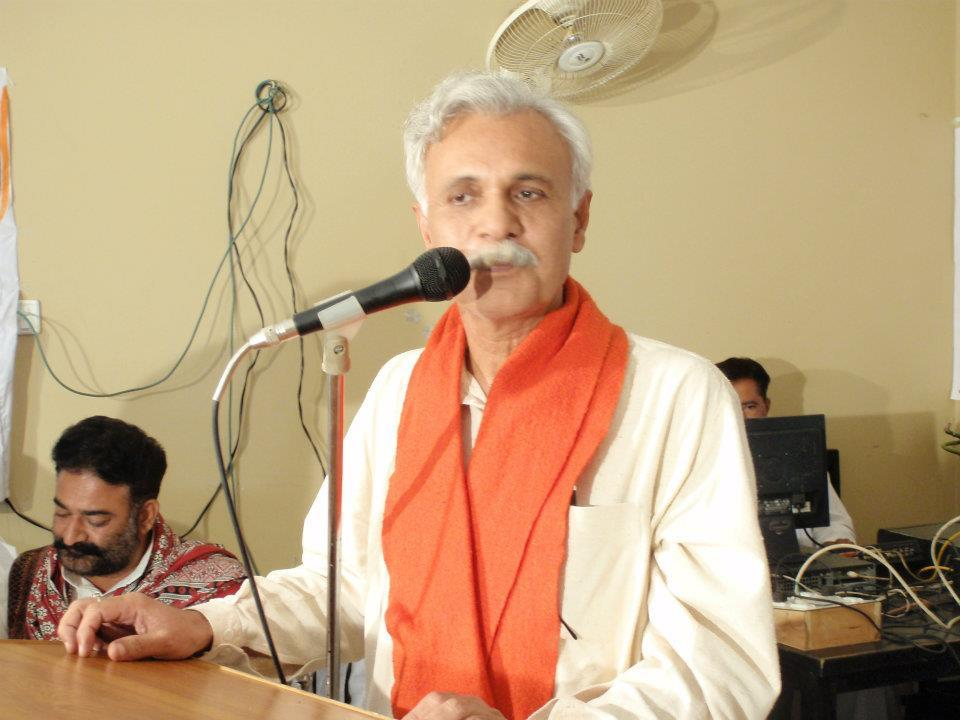
Dr. Ashu Lal, A Saraiki poet and intellectual

The Department of Saraiki, Islamia University, Bahawalpur was established in 1989 and the Department of Saraiki, Bahauddin Zakariya University, Multan was established in 2006. Saraiki is taught as a subject in schools and colleges at higher secondary and intermediate. Saraiki is also taught at degree level at the Allama Iqbal Open University at Islamabad, and the Al-Khair University at Bhimbir have Pakistani Linguistics Departments. They offer M.Phil. and Ph.D in Saraiki. The Associated Press of Pakistan has launched a Saraiki version of its site, as well.

Saraiki is written using the Arabic-derived Urdu alphabet with the addition of seven diacritically modified letters to represent the implosives and the extra nasals. (Note: The practice is traced back to Juke's 1900 dictionary. The modern standard was agreed upon in 1979 (Wagha 1997, pp. 240–41).) In Sindh the Sindhi alphabet is used. The calligraphic styles used are Naskh and Nastaʿlīq.

Historically, traders or bookkeepers wrote in a script known as kiṛakkī or laṇḍā, although use of this script has been significantly reduced in recent times. Likewise, a script related to the Landa scripts family, known as Multani, was previously used to write Saraiki. A preliminary proposal to encode the Multani script in ISO/IEC 10646 was submitted in 2011.

== See also ==
- South-Punjab
- Saraiki people
- List of Saraiki people
- Saraiki cuisine
- Saraiki diaspora
- List of Seraiki tribes
- Saraiki literature

== Sources ==
- Lewis, M. Paul; Simons, Gary F.; Fennig, Charles D., eds. (2016). "Saraiki". Ethnologue (19 ed.). Archived from the original on 25 April 2019.
- Shackle, Christopher (2003). "Panjabi". In Cardona, George; Jain, Dhanesh (eds.). The Indo-Aryan languages. Routledge language family series. Y. London: Routledge. pp. 581–621. ISBN 978-0-7007-1130-7.
- —— (2014). "Siraiki language". Encyclopædia Britannica.
- Wagha, Muhammad Ahsan (1997). The development of Siraiki language in Pakistan (Ph.D.). School of Oriental and African Studies. Archived from the original on 2017-02-14.
