= Derawal Nagar =

- Neighborhood of Delhi
- Location in Delhi, India
- Coordinates: 28.6974°N 77.1895°E
- Country: India
- State: Delhi
- District: North Delhi

Government
  - Body: Municipal Corporation Of Delhi

Languages
  - Official: Hindi, English
- Time zone: UTC+5:30 (IST)
- PIN: 110009
- Nearest city: Shahdara / Loni
- Lok Sabha constituency: North West Delhi
- Civic agency: MCD

Derawal Nagar is a neighbourhood in North Delhi. It is named after people of the Derawal community. Originally native to the Derajat region (districts of Dera Ismail Khan and Dera Ghazi Khan in present-day Pakistan). These individuals, who are mostly Hindu, were settled here after the partition of India in 1947. It comprises two blocks A and B.

== See also ==
- Dera Ghazi Khan
- Dera Ismail Khan
- Derajat
- Derawal
- Saraiki language
- Derawali dialect
