= Derajat =

Historical and cultural region in central Pakistan

Derajat ڈیرہ جات
- Region
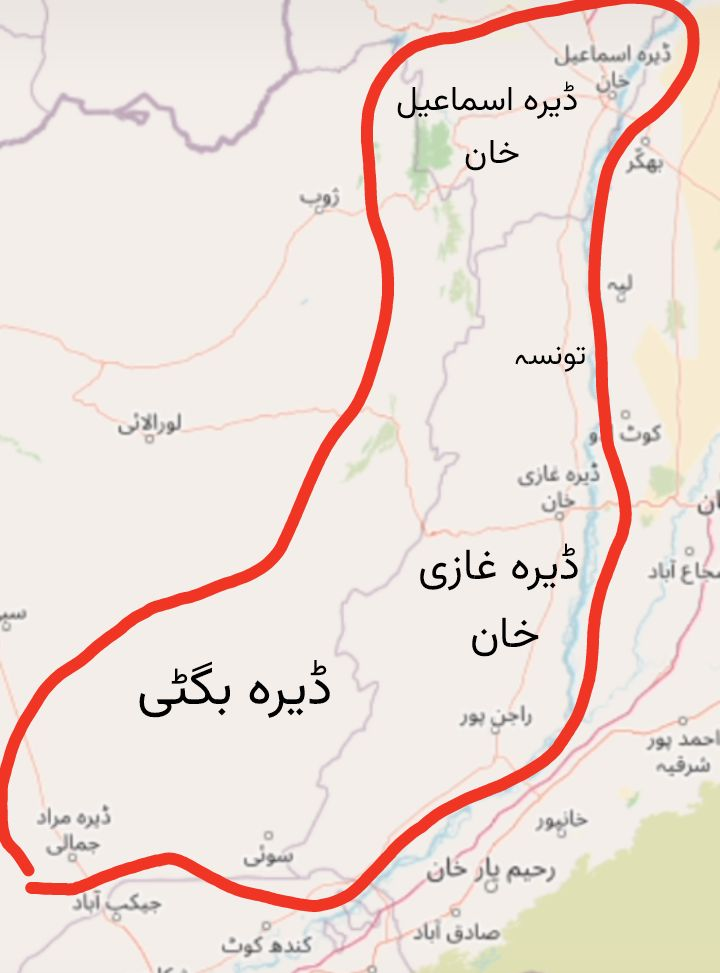
- Provinces: Balochistan; Khyber Pakhtunkhwa; Punjab

Area
  - Total: 36,474 km^{2} (14,083 sq mi)
- Demonym: Derawal

Demographics
  - Ethnic groups: Saraikis, Baloch; Minor: Pashtuns, Punjabis
  - Languages: Saraiki, Balochi, Punjabi, Pashto, Urdu
- Time zone: UTC+05:00 (PKT)
- Largest cities: Dera Ghazi Khan; Dera Ismail Khan; Rajanpur; Taunsa; Dera Bugti; Dera Murad Jamali

Derajat (Urdu: ڈیرہ جات, the plural of the word 'dera' lit. 'Camps') is a historical and cultural region in central Pakistan, bounded by the Indus River to the east and the Sulaiman Mountains to the west. The provinces of Punjab, Khyber Pakhtunkhwa, and Balochistan meet in this region.

Derajat includes the present-day administrative districts of Dera Ismail Khan, Dera Ghazi Khan, Rajanpur, Taunsa and Tank in the Khyber Pakhtunkhwa and Punjab provinces. The "Baloch Derajat" (consisting of Dera Bugti, Dera Allah Yar and Dera Murad Jamali) is adjacent to Derajat towards the southwest in Balochistan. The people of Derajat are called Derawal, and the varieties of Punjabi they speak are collectively called Derawali dialect. Pashto and Balochi languages are spoken in the northern and western parts of Derajat, respectively.

== Topography ==
The Derajat is a level plain between the Indus River and the Sulaiman Mountains, lying between 29°30′ and 34°15′ N. and 69°15′ and 72′ E., the name derives its name from, the three Deras : Dera Ismail Khan, Dera Fateh Khan, and Dera Ghazi Khan. It extends north to the Sheikh Badin National Park among the Sheikh Badin range, which divides it from the Marwat plain, and south to the town of Jampur, having a length of 325 miles and breadth of 50 miles.

== History ==
=== Emergence ===
The Derajat owes its existence as an historical area to the Baloch migration in the 15th century when Sultan Husseyn Shah of Langah Sultanate, being unable to hold his vast trans Indus possessions called in Baloch mercenaries, and assigned these territories to Malik Sohrab Dodai as jagir. Malik Sohrab's sons, Ghazi Khan, Ismail Khan and Fateh Khan, founded the three Deras or 'settlements' named after them.

=== Mughal Era ===
During Babar's conquest of Northern India in 1526 the chiefs of Derajat submitted to him, and at his death the Derajat became a dependency of his son Kamran Mirza, the ruler of Kabul. Under Humayun the Baloch immigration increased, and they gradually pushed the Nahars further south. All the Baloch tribes acknowledged the overlordship of the Dodai Nawabs, who ruled for about fifteen generations at Dera Ghazi Khan and Dera Ismail Khan and also held Darya Khan and Bhakkar, east of the Indus. Early in the eighteenth century the Nawabs lost their supremacy, being overwhelmed by the Kalhoras of Sind.

=== Nader Shah's invasion ===
In 1739 after Nadir Shah had defeated the Mughals and acquired all the territory west of the Indus, he made the Wazir, Mahmud Khan Gujar, governor in Dera Ghazi Khan under the Kalhora chief, who also became his vassal.

=== Durrani Empire ===
Under Ahmad Shah Durrani the Kalhoras, now in a state of decadence, contended for possession of Dera Ghazi Khan, but Mahmud Khan Gujar appeared to have been its real governor. He was succeeded by his nephew, who was killed in 1779, and the Durranis then appointed governors directly for a period of thirty two years. Meanwhile, the last of the chiefs of Dera Ismail Khan had been deposed in 1770, and his territories were also administered from Kabul. In 1794 Humayun Shah attempted to deprive Zaman Shah Durrani of his kingdom, but he was defeated and fell into the hands of Muhammad Khan Sadozai, governor of the Sind Sagar Doab.

=== Under the Sikh Empire ===
As a reward for this capture, Zaman Shah bestowed the province of Dera Ismail Khan on Nawab Muhammad Khan, who governed it from Mankera by deputy. His son-in-law, Hafiz Ahmad Khan, surrendered at Mankera to Ranjit Singh in 1821, and at the same time tribute was imposed by the Sikhs on the chiefs of Tank and Sagar. Dera Fateh Khan was also occupied; but Dera Ismail Khan, to which Hafiz Ahmad Khan was permitted to retire on the fall of Mankera, remained independent till 1836, when Nao Nihal Singh deposed Muhammad Khan, the son of Hafiz Ahmad Khan, and appointed Diwan Lakhi Mal to be Kardar. Diwan Lakhi Mal held this post till his death in 1843, and was succeeded by his son Diwan Daulat Rai, who enjoyed the support of the Multani Pathan Sardars. He was bitterly opposed by Malik Fateh Khan Tiwana, who had also procured a nomination as Kardar from the Sikh Durbar.

=== British Raj ===
These rivals contended for supremacy with varying success until 1847, when the Diwan then in possession was deposed on the recommendation of Herbert Edwardes, who appointed General Van Cortlandt to be Kardar. The Derajat passed to the British in 1849, and is now (in 1911) divided between the Districts of Dera Ghazi Khan in the Punjab and Dera Ismail Khan in the Khyber Pakhtunkhwa.

=== Post Independence ===
After the independence of Pakistan in 1947, many Muslim refugees from India settled in Derajat while most Hindus and Sikhs migrated to India. Many of Derajat's Hindu residents settled in the Derawal Nagar colony of Delhi, India, while others were dispersed around in the states of Haryana, Punjab and Uttar Pradesh.

== Demographics ==
Languages of Derajat (2023)
1. Saraiki (72.7%)
2. Pashto (12.6%)
3. Balochi (11.5%)
4. Urdu (2.17%)
5. Punjabi (0.88%)
6. Others (0.20%)

According to the 2023 Census of Pakistan, the total population of Derajat (comprising Dera Ismail Khan, Dera Ghazi Khan, Rajanpur and Tank Districts) was 8,003,764. The main languages in Derajat are Saraiki, Pashto, and Balochi. In addition, Urdu is also used.

Religious groups in the Derajat (British India era)
Religious group	1901		1911		1921		1931		1941	
Religious group	Pop.	%	Pop.	%	Pop.	%	Pop.	%	Pop.	%
Islam	759,206	88.32%	880,867	89.65%	846,295	88.29%	915,609	89.43%	1,045,498	89.49%
Hinduism (Note: 1931-1941: Including Ad-Dharmis)	93,945	10.93%	95,697	9.74%	105,917	11.05%	102,609	10.02%	116,288	9.95%
Sikhism	5,803	0.68%	5,226	0.53%	4,424	0.46%	4,327	0.42%	5,154	0.44%
Christianity	509	0.06%	675	0.07%	1,568	0.16%	1,131	0.11%	1,256	0.11%
Jainism	158	0.02%	23	0%	297	0.03%	125	0.01%	107	0.01%
Zoroastrianism	14	0%	28	0%	10	0%	6	0%	1	0%
Judaism	4	0%	9	0%	3	0%	0	0%	1	0%
Buddhism	0	0%	0	0%	0	0%	1	0%	6	0%
Tribal	—N/a	—N/a	—N/a	—N/a	—N/a	—N/a	32	0%	0	0%
Others	0	0%	0	0%	0	0%	2	0%	0	0%
Total population	859,639	100%	982,525	100%	958,514	100%	1,023,842	100%	1,168,311	100%
Note: Including Dera Ghazi Khan District, Punjab, Biloch Trans–Frontier Tract, Punjab, Dera Ismail Khan District, North-West Frontier Province, Loralai District, Balochistan, and Sibi District, Balochistan (Administered Areas and Marri-Bugti Country). District borders are not an exact match in the present-day due to various bifurcations to district borders — which since created new districts — throughout the region during the post-independence era that have taken into account population increases.
