= Derawal =

The Derawal (Saraiki: ڈیریوال) are a community originating from Derajat, a cultural region extending from river Indus to Sulaiman Range in central Pakistan. The varieties of Saraiki spoken by the Derawal people are collectively known as Derawali (also locally known as Hindki).

Most of the Hindu and Sikh Derawal migrated to India at the time of the partition of British India in 1947. The neighbourhood of Derawal Nagar in Delhi gets its name from this community. There are several regional and national Derawal organizations in India today.
