= Shahid Siddiqui (professor) =

Pakistani educationist and linguist

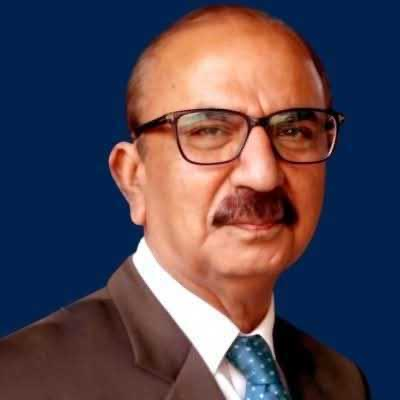
Dr. Shahid Siddiqui, Pakistani Academic, Educationist, and Former Vice-Chancellor of AIOU

Dr Shahid Siddiqui (Urdu: ڈاکٹر شاہد صدیقی) is a Pakistani educationist, applied linguist, researcher, and novelist, who works on language policy, critical pedagogy, teacher education, and creative non-fiction. He was the vice-chancellor of Allama Iqbal Open University, Islamabad from 2014 to 2018, where he introduced new academic programmes and emphasized research and student support. He is currently Dean of the Faculty of Social Sciences, Media Studies, Art and Design at Lahore School of Economics (LSE). Siddiqui is the author of several academic books, among them Language, Gender and Power (Oxford University Press, 2013, 2025) and Education Policies in Pakistan: Politics, Projections and Practices (Oxford University Press, 2016, 2021), He also wrote the Urdu novel آدھے ادھورے خواب (Adhe Adhoore Khwab), which has been translated into Punjabi, Sindhi, Pashto, and English as Dreams Don’t Die.

== Academic career ==
Siddiqui began his career in 1980 as a lecturer in English with the Punjab Department of Education. Between 1983 and 1996, he taught and designed distance education materials at Allama Iqbal Open University in Islamabad, rising to associate professor. From 1996 to 1999, he was an associate professor at the Aga Khan University Institute for Educational Development in Karachi.

== Leadership Roles ==
In the 2000s Siddiqui headed the Management Sciences and Humanities Programme at Ghulam Ishaq Khan Institute of Engineering Sciences and Technology (GIKI) and later joined Lahore University of Management Sciences (LUMS). In 2006, he moved to the Lahore School of Economics (LSE), where he was Professor and Dean, Faculty of Social Sciences, Media Studies, Art and Design until 2014.

On 9 October 2014, Siddiqui was appointed vice chancellor of Allama Iqbal Open University (AIOU), the world’s second-largest open university, serving a student body of about 1.3 million. His four-year tenure emphasised research culture, new academic programmes, and improved student support systems. After leaving AIOU, he became Dean, Faculty of Social Sciences and later Dean of Languages (2021) at the National University of Modern Languages (NUML) in Islamabad before returning to the Lahore School of Economics as Dean, Faculty of Social Sciences, Media Studies, Art, and Design in August 2021.

== Research Work ==
Siddiqui’s research lies at the intersection of language policy, critical discourse, teacher education, and social justice. His doctoral work investigated the cognitive consequences of print exposure, while later projects, often funded by agencies such as the Social Sciences Research Council, explored bilingual education, community participation in schooling, and gender representation in discourse.

He has published more than fifty peer-reviewed journal articles and book chapters and sits on the editorial boards of over a dozen academic journals, including the Journal of Critical Inquiry and Archives of Educational Studies. A frequent keynote speaker, he has addressed conferences in North America, Europe, South Asia, and the Middle East, notably the Karachi Literature Festival (multiple years) and the 11th International Conference of the Linguistics Association of Pakistan (2025).

== Awards/Scholarships ==
- British Council scholarship for doing M.Ed. TESOL in the University of Manchester, U.K.
- U.S. Embassy scholarship for a Certificate Course in TESL in School of International Training, USA.
- Canadian Commonwealth scholarship for doing a Ph.D. in University of Toronto, Canada.
- Charles Wallace Scholarship for short term Postgraduate research in University of Oxford.
- Social Sciences Research Council (New York) award for 2004.
- MTCP award for participating in Webpage Designing course in Malaysia 2004.

== Academic Books ==
- Rethinking Education in Pakistan: Perceptions, Practices, and Possibilities (2007,2010), Karachi: Paramount Publishing.
- Education, Inequalities, and Freedom: A sociopolitical critique (2012), Islamabad: Narratives.
- Language, Gender, and Power: Politics of Representation and Hegemony (2013), Karachi: Oxford University Press.
- Education Policies in Pakistan: Politics, Projections and Practices (2016), Karachi: Oxford University Press.
- Pakistan, Education. And 21st Century (Urdu) (2023), Jhelum: Book Corner.

== Creative Fiction and Non-Fiction Books ==
- Adhe Adhooray Khawab (2009, 2011, 2016), Lahore: Jahangir Books, Sang e Meel, National Book Foundation.
- Ad Pachade Sufne (2020), Punjabi Translation of Adhe Adhoore Khawab by Qaisra Jaswal, Lahore: Sang-e-Meel Publications.
- Zer e Asman (2020), Lahore: Sang-e-Meel Publications.
- Mausam e Khush Rang (2021), Lahore: Sang-e-Meel Publications.
- Ad Pora Khawab (2021), Sindhi translation of Adhe Adhoore Khawab by Mushtaq Phul., Sindh: Preet Publications.
- Potohar; Khitta-e-Dilruba (2021), Jhelum: Book Corner Publications.
- Nimekiri Khobona (2022), Pashto translation of the novel by Naveed Jamal, Aadhe Adhore Khawab, Islamabad: National Book Foundation.
- Dreams Don’t Die (2023). English translation of the novel Aadhe Adhoore Khawab by Lubna Umar, Islamabad: National Book Foundation.
- Toronto, Dubai & Manchester (Urdu) (2024), Jhelum: Book Corner Publications.
- Aasman Dar Aasman (Urdu) (2025), Jhelum: Book Corner Publications.

== Columns and Media Writing ==
Since 2000, Siddiqui has contributed regular opinion columns on education, language policy, and social issues to Pakistani newspapers such as Dawn, The News, and Dunya News.
