= Saraiki literature =

Literature in the Saraiki language of Pakistani Punjab

Saraiki literature is the body of literary works written in the Saraiki language, spoken primarily in South Punjab, Pakistan.

== Overview ==
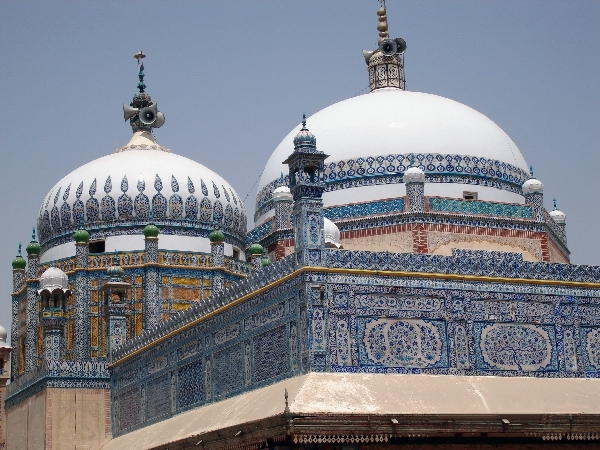
Tomb of Sufi poet Khwaja Ghulam Farid

The language, partly codified during the British Raj, derived its emotional attraction from the poetry of the Sufi saint, Khawaja Ghulam Farid, who has become an identity symbol. His poems, known as Kafi are still famous.

The beloved's intense glances call for blood
The dark hair wildly flows The Kohl of the eyes is fiercely black
And slays the lovers with no excuse
My appearance in ruins, I sit and wait
While the beloved has settled in Malheer I feel the sting of the cruel dart
My heart the, abode of pain and grief A life of tears, I have led Farid

— one of Khwaja Ghulam Farid's poems (translated)

Shakir Shujabadi (Kalam-e-Shakir, Khuda Janey, Shakir Diyan Ghazlan, Peelay Patr, Munafqan Tu Khuda Bachaway, and Shakir De Dohray are his famous books) is a very well recognized modern poet.

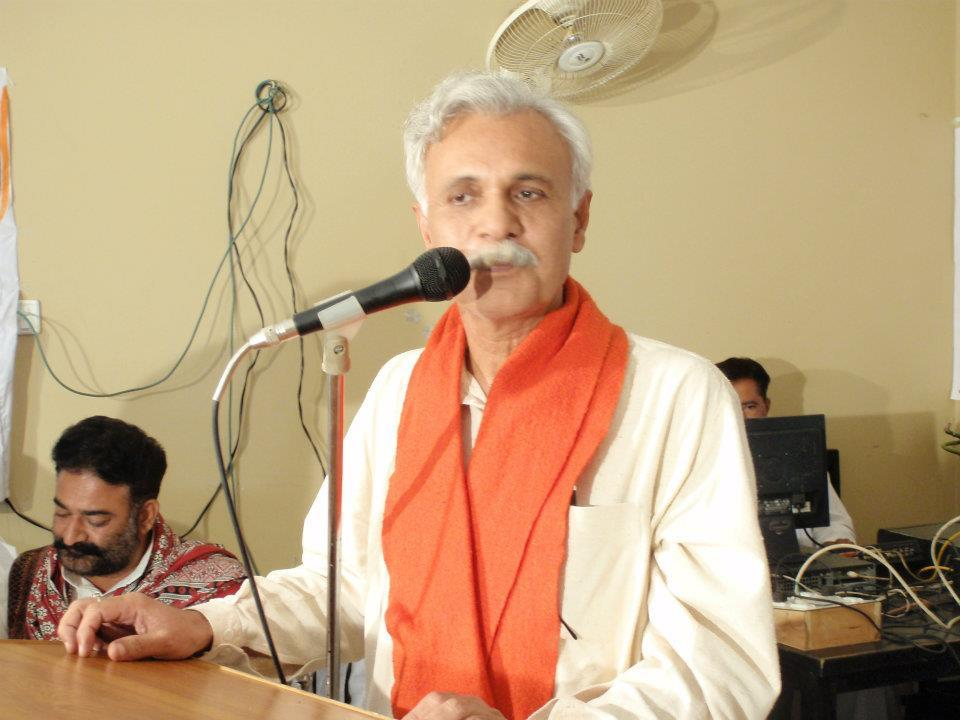
Dr. Ashu Lal, A Saraiki poet and intellectual

== In academia ==
The Department of Saraiki, Islamia University, Bahawalpur was established in 1989 and the Department of Saraiki, Bahauddin Zakariya University, Multan was established in 2006. Saraiki is taught as a subject in schools and colleges at higher secondary, intermediate and degree level. The Allama Iqbal Open University in Islamabad, and the Al-Khair University in Bhimbir have Pakistani Linguistics Departments offering M.Phil. and Ph.D in Saraiki.

The Associated Press of Pakistan have also launched a Saraiki version of the news site.

== Writing system ==
In the province of Punjab, Saraiki is written using the Arabic-derived Urdu alphabet with the addition of seven diacritically modified letters to represent the implosives and the extra nasals. (Note: The practice is traced back to Juke's 1900 dictionary. The modern standard was agreed upon in 1979 (Wagha 1997, pp. 240–41).) In Sindh the Sindhi alphabet is used. The calligraphic styles used are Naskh and Nastaʿlīq.

Historically, traders or bookkeepers wrote in a script known as kiṛakkī or laṇḍā, although use of this script has been significantly reduced in recent times. Likewise, a script related to the Landa scripts family, known as Multani, was previously used to write Saraiki. A preliminary proposal to encode the Multani script in ISO/IEC 10646 was submitted in 2011.

== Notable people ==
- Mehr Abdul Haq
- Akbar Makhmoor
- Ismail Ahmedani (1930–2007), novelist and fiction writer, author of Amar Kahani, Peet de Pandh and Chhulian
- Mehr Abdul Haq (1915–1995), author of Multani Zaban Ka Urdu Se Taaluq
- Christopher Shackle, a researcher on Saraiki language

== See also ==
- Saraiki people
- Saraiki culture
- Saraikistan
- Sauvira Kingdom

== Sources ==
- Lewis, M. Paul; Simons, Gary F.; Fennig, Charles D., eds. (2016). "Saraiki". Ethnologue (19 ed.). Archived from the original on 25 April 2019.
- Shackle, Christopher (2003). "Panjabi". In Cardona, George; Jain, Dhanesh (eds.). The Indo-Aryan languages. Routledge language family series. Y. London: Routledge. pp. 581–621. ISBN 978-0-7007-1130-7.
- —— (2014). "Siraiki language". Encyclopædia Britannica.
- Wagha, Muhammad Ahsan (1997). The development of Siraiki language in Pakistan (Ph.D.). School of Oriental and African Studies. Archived from the original on 14 February 2017.
