= Mehr Abdul Haq =

Pakistani writer and academic

- Born: 1 June 1915; Layyah, Punjab, British India
- Died: 23 February 1995 (aged 79); Multan, Pakistan
- Occupations: Philologist, Linguist, Research Scholar
- Awards: Pride of Performance (1994)

Mehr Abdul Haq (Urdu: مہر عبدالحق; 1 June 1915 – 23 February 1995) was a philologist from Pakistan.

== Early life and education ==
Mehr got his Ph.D. degree from the University of Punjab, Lahore, Pakistan, on “Multani Zaban ka Urdu se Talaq" (lit. The relation of Multani language with Urdu). After completing his education, he joined the education department, where he worked on different posts. He retired in 1970. He was a Saraiki linguist, research scholar, critic, and historian. He was also an expert on the Pakistani Sufi poet Khwaja Ghulam Farid and the life and works of Ghulam Farid (Faridiat).

== Awards named after him ==
Pakistan Academy of Letters, a Pakistani literary organization, has an award named after him, Mehr Abdul Haq Award for Seraiki-language prose for writers in that language.

== Awards and recognition ==
He was awarded the Pride of Performance award by the President of Pakistan in 1994.

== Works ==
- Translation of Quran in Saraiki
- Multani Zaban ka Urdu se taaluq (Connecting relations between Urdu and Multani (Saraiki) language), Published in 1967
- Mazeed Lisani Tahqiqan (More linguistic research)
- Lughat-I-Faridi (Dictionary of Khawaja Ghulam Farid) (A Saraiki folk poet)
- Vision of Khawaja Farid-Past and
- Saraiki lok Geet (Saraiki folk songs)
- Lalarian (Poetry in Saraiki language)
- Hindu Sanmiat (Hindu mythology)
- Multan ke badshah, namwar governor aur hamla aawar (Kings, gove and invaders of Multan)
- Saraiki Zaban aur us ki hamsaya ilaqi zabaneen
- Saraiki zaban de qaeday, qanoon (Rules and regulations of Saraiki language)
