= List of Saraiki people =

This is a list of notable Saraikis.

== Poets ==
- Shakir Shuja Abadi
- Ashu Lal Faqeer
- Akbar Makhmoor
- Ahmad Khan Tariq

== Music ==
- Shafaullah Rokhri

== Politicians ==
- Ali Musa Gilani
- Yousaf Raza Gillani

== Writers ==
- Gopi Chand Narang
