= Riasti dialect =

Dialect of Saraiki

- Native to: Pakistan
- Language family: Indo-European: Indo-Iranian; Indo-Aryan; Northwestern; Panjabic; Lahnda; Saraiki; Riasti dialect

Language codes
- ISO 639-3: –
- Glottolog: baha1254

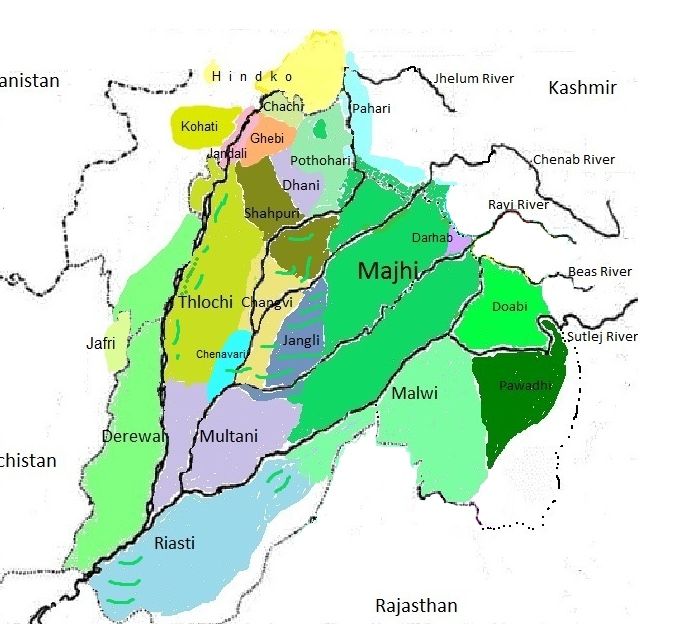
Map of dialects of Punjabi and some closely related languages

Riasti is a term used for a group of Lahnda varieties spoken in the Cholistan Desert along the banks of the river Sutlej in the southern Punjab, Pakistan. Its definition is imprecise, and is usually taken to refer to the central (Multani) and southern dialects of Saraiki language which were spoken in the former riasat (transl. state) of Bahawalpur, in what are now the Bahawalpur and Rahim Yar Khan districts, respectively. The southern dialect, also known as Bahawalpuri, is spoken in the southern parts of Dera Ghazi Khan (present Rajanpur) as well.

== See also ==
- Derawali dialect
