= Ahmad Khan Tariq =

Pakistani poet

- Born: 25 September 1924; Shah Sadar Deen, Dera Ghazi Khan, Punjab Province, British Raj
- Died: 10 February 2017 (aged 92)
- Occupation: Poet
- Children: 10

Saeen Ahmad Khan Tariq (25 September 1924 – 10 February 2017), was a prominent -Saraiki poet.

== Books ==
He was known for the following books:

- Gharoon Dar Taannee
- Mattaan Maal Wallay
- Maikoon See Laggday
- Sussi
- Main Kia Aakhaan
- Hath Jorri Jjul
- Bbaytt Dee Khushboo
  - Umraan Daa Porhiya
