= Akbar Makhmoor =

Saraiki-language poet and lexicographer (1956–2017)

Akbar Makhmoor Mughal
- Born: 29 November 1956; Jhoke Uttra, Dera Ghazi Khan, Pakistan
- Died: 22 July 2017 (aged 60); Dera Ghazi Khan, Pakistan
- Occupation: Poet
- Children: 6

Akbar Makhmoor Mughal (1956 – 2017) was a notable Saraiki-language poet and lexicographer known for the compilation of 115,000 words of Saraiki under the title Saraiki Akhar Pothi. He lived in Saudi Arabia for 10 years where he worked as a labourer. He died at the age of 61.

== Saraiki dictionary ==
He compiled following unpublished dictionary:

- Saraiki Akhar Pothi
