= Shafaullah Rokhri =

Pakistani folk singer (1966–2020)

Shafaullah Khan Rokhri شفاء اللہ خان روکھڑی
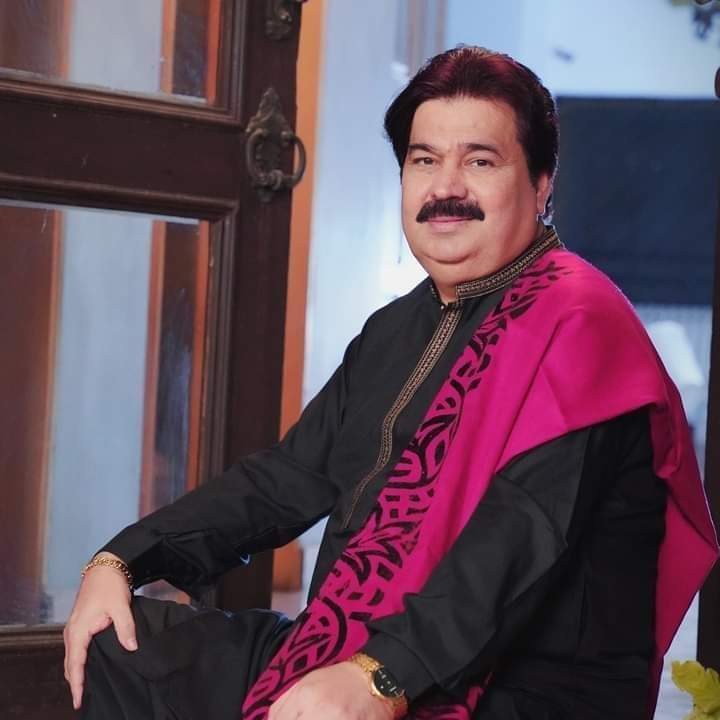

Background information
- Born: 1966; Rokhri, Mianwali, Pakistan
- Died: 29 August 2020 Islamabad, Pakistan
- Genres: Folk, ghazal
- Occupations: Folk singer, songwriter, music composer
- Years active: 1980s–2020
- Labels: Rokhri Productions; Thar Production Pakistan

Shafaullah Khan Rokhri (1966 – 29 August 2020) was a Pakistani folk singer, songwriter, and music producer renowned for his contributions to the Punjab regional music of Pakistan.

He mainly sang Punjabi songs which are popular all over Pakistan. He and his son Zeeshan Khan Rokhri produced music under their own label, Rokhri Productions.

Shafaullah Rokhri is regarded as one of the most popular singers from South Punjab, second only to Attaullah Khan Esakhelvi. After his death, his son Zeeshan Rokhri carried forward his musical legacy.

== Early life ==
Rokhri was born to a Saraiki family in 1966 in Mianwali, Punjab, he initially joined Punjab Police as a constable but due to his interest in music, left the job to pursue a career in music.

== Music career ==
Rokhri started his music career in the 1980s and soon rose to fame. He released a number of albums and became a prolific singer of the Saraiki folk genre. He was considered second only to Attaullah Khan Esakhelvi, also from Mianwali.

In later years, his son Zeeshan Rokhri joined him and the father-son duo sang many songs which became immensely popular in Pakistan. They also produced a music show, Folk Studio, and operated their own music label, Rokhri Productions, which featured artists from Saraiki belt.

During last decade, they mostly revamped their own songs and released them on YouTube, garnering millions of views. His songs have been covered by a number of new singers who rose to fame singing and following his style.

== Personal life ==
He was married and had a daughter and four sons. His son Zeeshan Khan Rokhri is also a famous Saraiki singer.

== Death ==
Rokhri died on 29 August 2020 in Islamabad, due to cardiac arrest. Punjab's Chief Minister Usman Buzdar expressed condolences to Rokhri's family, saying that he would long be remembered for the promotion of Saraiki singing.
