= Siraiki (Sindhi dialect) =

Sindhi dialect

Siraiki, also known as Ubheji, Siroli and Sireli, is a dialect of the Sindhi language spoken in the Siro region of upper Sindh. Inhabitants of this 'Siro' (Note: the region of upper Sindh) region are known as Sirai. The Siraiki dialect of upper Sindh is not to be confused with the Saraiki language of the south Punjab, which share a similar name.

== Etymology ==
In Sindhī, the word siru means 'head.' From it is derived sirō, the extremity of anything, and, hence, the upper part of Sindh, from the northern frontier down to, say, the 27th degree of north latitude, about midway between Larkana and Sehwan. From this, again, is derived the adjective sirāikō, of or belonging to Upper Sindh or the Sirō. The word "Siraiki" means "northern speech" and is derived from Sindhi language.

== Words and comparison ==
The following words are peculiar to lari dialect of Sindhi:

abhu (heavens, air), ãțō (an embrace, turn, return, dispute), ayal (mother, mamma (a term of endearment), bbijo (second, another), bhatu (a scorpion), bhatuari (a small scorpion), bhiranu (to meet; to mix, mingle) bhitao (property, goods and chattels) dduãr (illnesses, sickness, disease) jjērō (fire) juhārō "m" Juhārī "f" (the visit paid to newly married couple after honeymoon) laī (a female friend or equal; a term of affection used in addressing a female) liphōtī (a coverlet, quilt) machhun "interj"(God forbid) nāiru (a coconut) nīghō (a boy, lad), phutiro (clean, nice, elegant) wahalō (quickly, speedily), wahurō (rich, wealthy), wanaharō (a bridegroom)

Word comparison in different Sindhi dialects:
| English | Lari | Vicholi | Uttaradi | Lasi | Kutchi |
|---|---|---|---|---|---|
| I | Aao(n) | Aao(n) | Maa(n) | Ã | Aau(n) |
| My | Mujo | Muhnjo | Mahjo/Manjo | Majo/Mojo | Mujo |
| You "Sin, plu" (formal) | Aa(n)/Aei(n) | Awha(n)/Awhee(n) Tawha(n)/Tawhee(n) | Taha(n)/ Tahee(n)/Ta(n) | Awa(n)/Ai(n) | Ai(n) |
| What | Kujaro/Kujja | Chha/Kahirō | Chha/Shha | Chho | Kuro |
| Why | Ko | Chho | Chho/Shho | Chhela | Kolai/Kurelae |
| How | Kei(n) | Kiya(n) | Kiya(n) | | Kee(n) |
| Foot | Pagg/Pagulo | Pair | Pair | Pair | Pag |
| To wash | Dhun(u) | Dhoain(u) | Dhuan(u) | | |
| Far | Ddoor | Pare | Pare | Ddor | Chhete |
| Near | Vejo/Ōdō/Ōdirō/Ore | Vejhō | Vejhō/Vejhe | Ōddō | Wat |
| Good/Excellent | Khaso/Sutho/Thauko | Sutho | Sutho/Bhalo/Chango | Khasho | khaso/Laat |
| High | Ucho | Utāho | Mathe | Ucho | Ucho |
| Silver | Chadi/Rupo | Rupo | Chandi | Rupo | Rupo |
| Father | Pay/Abo/Aba/Ada | Piu | Pee/Babo/Pirhe(n) | Pe | Pe/Bapa/Ada |
| Wife | Joe/Wani/kuwar | Joe/Gharwari | Zaal/Gharwari | Zaal | Vahu/Vau |
| Man | Māņu/Mārū/Mard /Murs/Musaloo | Mardu | Manhu/Bhai/Musalo /Kako/Hamra | Mānhu | Māḍū/Mārū |
| Woman | Zala/ōrat/ōlath | Aurat | Mai/Ran | Zala | Bāeḍi/Bāyaḍī |
| Child/Baby | Bbar/Ningar/Gabhur /Kako | Bbar/Ningar/Balak | Bbar/Bacho/Adro/ Phar (animal) | Gabhar | Bar/Gabhar |
| Daughter | Dia/Niyani/Kañā | Dhiu/Niyani | Dhee/Adri | Dhia | Dhi |
| Sun | Sij/Sūrij | Siju | Sijhu | Siju | Sūraj |
| Cat | Bili/Pusani | Billi | Billi | Phushini | Minni |
| Rain | Varsat/Mai(n) | Barsat/Mee(n)h /Barish | Barsat/Mee(n)h | | Varsat |
| And | Ãū(n)/Ãē(n)/Nē | Aēi(n) | Aēi(n)/Aū(n) | Ãē/Or | Nē/Anē |
| Is | Aye | Ahe | Aa/Ahe/Hai | Ahe/Aye | Aye |
| Sunlight | Karo | | Oosa | | Tarke |
| Slap | Tarr | Thaparr/Chammat | Chamatu/Lapatu/ Thapu | | |
| I went | Au(n) Vēs | Au(n) Vius | Ma(n) Vayus (m)/Vayas (f) | Ã viosī | Aao(n) veōs/ Vyōs |
