= Tariq Rahman =

Pakistani linguist (born 1949)

- Born: 4 February 1949 (age 77); Bareilly, United Provinces, Dominion of India
- Education: University of Sheffield; University of Strathclyde
- Awards: Humboldt Research Award, 2012; Sitara-i-Imtiaz (Star of Distinction), 2014; Pride of Performance, 2004; HEC Distinguished National Professor, 2004
- Scientific career
- Fields: Linguistic history
- Workplaces: Quaid-i-Azam University; Beaconhouse National University; Peshawar University; University of Azad Jammu and Kashmir

Tariq Rahman (born 4 February 1949) is a Pakistani academic scholar, newspaper columnist, researcher, and writer.

Currently based in Lahore, he is the author of many books and other publications, mainly in the field of linguistics. He has been awarded several national and international awards in recognition of his research and scholarly work.

== Early life and education ==
Tariq was born in Bareilly (U.P.) in India on 4 February 1949. The family moved to Pakistan in 1951. His father, Sami Ullah Khan, served as the head of the mathematics department at the Pakistan Military Academy in Kakul, near Abbottabad. Educated at Burn Hall School (now Army Burn Hall College), he joined the army as an armoured corps officer in 1971. However, he decided to leave the army—on the grounds of being a conscientious objector to the military action in East Pakistan, now Bangladesh. He finally resigned his commission in 1978. This was recognised by the Government of Bangladesh which conferred upon him a civil award on 1 October 2013 in Dhaka. Meanwhile, he had obtained three master's degrees as a private candidate. In 1979, he won a British Council scholarship, which later enabled him to obtain master's and doctoral degrees from the University of Sheffield in England in 1985. His first PhD was in literature. Later he left the path of literature as his main interest was in the social sciences.

== Career ==
Tariq joined academia as an associate professor in the English Department of Peshawar University in 1985. In 1987, he became a professor and head of the English Department at the University of Azad Jammu and Kashmir in Muzaffarabad where he introduced the subject of linguistics. In 1989, he also got an M.Litt. in linguistics from the University of Strathclyde in Glasgow. In 1990, he joined the National Institute of Pakistan Studies. Dr. Rahman was made a distinguished national professor for life in 2004 and a tenured professor in 2007. He joined the Beaconhouse National University, Lahore, Pakistan in 2011 as Dean of the School of Education. In September 2014 he was appointed as the Dean of Liberal Arts and Social Sciences at the same university. He retired as Dean (School of Education) on 1 September 2024. He has been an Academic Visitor at Wolfson College, University of Oxford, and is an Ordinary Member of the Common Room (subject to rules) at the same college. He has also been a visiting research fellow at the Centre of Islamic Studies at the University of Oxford.

== Awards and honors ==
- 1995–96, he was a Fulbright fellow (USA).
- 2004, he was awarded the Pride of Performance Award for research by the president of Pakistan.
- 2004-5, he was also the first incumbent of the Pakistan Chair at the University of California, Berkeley.
- 2007, he was appointed the director of the National Institute of Pakistan Studies, Quaid-e-Azam University, Islamabad and later in 2010, he was made a professor emeritus at the same university.
- 2009, he was given the Lifetime Achievement Award by the Higher Education Commission of Pakistan.
- September 2011 — after the end of his tenure as director of the NIPS at Quaid-e-Azam University – he accepted the deanship of the School of Education at the Beaconhouse National University in Lahore, Pakistan.
- November 2011, he was awarded the Humboldt Research Award for his research—being the first Pakistani to get the research award—though many Pakistanis had been given the Humboldt fellowship earlier. In the award ceremony on 20 June 2012, Professor Dr. Helmut Schwarz, president of the Alexander von Humboldt Stiftung said: 'I am delighted to welcome our first research award winner from Pakistan, Professor Tariq Rahman.' This award was conferred on him for his books such as Pakistani English (1990), A History of Pakistani Literature in English (1991), Language and Politics in Pakistan (1996), Language, Education and Culture (1999), Language, Ideology and Power: Language Learning Among the Muslims of Pakistan and North India (2002), Denizens of Alien Worlds: A Study of Education and Polarization in Pakistan (2004) and From Hindi to Urdu: A Social and Political History (2011) besides a large number of scholarly papers, conference presentations, book reviews and citations to his work in scholarly writing.
- 2014, the University of Sheffield awarded him a higher doctorate (Litt. D) after due examination of his total research output in humanities and social sciences.
- 2015–16, he was elected a visiting fellow at the Oxford Centre for Islamic Studies. Having been a visiting academic for three consecutive years in order to write a book, he was elected a permanent member of the common room at Wolfson College, University of Oxford in 2018.
- Sitara-i-Imtiaz (Star of Distinction) Award by the president of Pakistan in 2014.
- 2018 Higher Education Commission, Pakistan award for Best Book (Social Sciences) of the year for Names: A Study of Personal Names, Identity and Power in Pakistan (Karachi: Oxford University Press, 2015).
- 2018 Elected Permanent Member of the Common-room, Wolfson College, University of Oxford, England.
- 2020 Awarded the Best Book of the Year (non-fiction) 2019-2020 prize for Interpretations of Jihad in South Asia: an Intellectual History (Berlin: Walter de Gruyter, 2018 and Karachi: Oxford University Press, 2019 and New Delhi: Orient Blackswan, 2020). Award given by Habib Bank Metropolitan at the Karachi Literary Festival, 2020.
- Awarded the Best Book of the year (Non-fiction) prize by the UBL Bank for Pakistan's wars (2022) on 25 May 2024.
- Awarded the Best Book of the Year (non-fiction) 2019-2020 prize for Interpretations of Jihad in South Asia, 9th United Bank Limited Literary Awards, 8 September 2020.
- Elected Fellow of the Pakistan Academy of Sciences, vide letter of 7 January 2021.

== Research and publications ==
To write his book From Hindi to Urdu: A Social and Political History, Dr. Rahman travelled to some of the major cities in Pakistan and to four other countries: England, France, Germany and India. He studied sources in Urdu, Persian, and Hindi. He also got works in Chaghtai Turkish, French and German translated for himself. He learned the Devanagari script on his own and Persian at the Khana-e-Farhang in Rawalpindi at the age of 58.

He has also published three collections of short stories and has edited two books. His research-based published work is mostly on sociolinguistic history, language and politics and educational linguistics with focus on the Muslims of north India and Pakistan but he has also published on onomastics (Names OUP, 2015) and intellectual history. He has also written more than 107 articles in scholarly journals, 24 entries in reference books, 10 encyclopaedia articles, 45 chapters in books and many book reviews. In addition to Oxford University Press, Karachi, his books have been published by Orient Blackswan in India. His last book Interpretations of Jihad in South Asia: an Intellectual History was published by Walter de Gruyter from Berlin and Boston in 2018 and a paperback edition was published by Oxford University Press in Pakistan in 2019. In 2022 his book Pakistan's Wars: an Alternative History was published by Routledge, Francis and Taylor from London and New York. The South Asia edition was published by Routledge India (New Delhi). His latest book is Handbook of Mirza Ghalib's Poetry and Poetics: Commentaries and Contemporary Concerns (Singapore: Springer Nature, 2024). Also downloadable from ResearchGate and Academia.edu are The Complete Short Stories of Tariq Rahman (2024) and Not the Whole Truth: the Life and Times of Tariq Rahman

== Selected bibliography ==
- 1990. Pakistani English Islamabad: National Institute of Pakistan Studies, Quaid-i-Azam University.
- 1991. A History of Pakistani Literature in English Lahore: Vanguards and Karachi: Oxford University Press, 2015.
- 1996. Language and Politics in Pakistan Karachi: Oxford University Press Reprinted Delhi: Orient Blackswan, 2000.
- 1996. The History of the Urdu-English Controversy in Pakistan. Islamabad: National Language Authority
- 1997. An Introduction to Linguistics. Lahore: Vanguard Books Karachi: Oxford University Press, 2010.
- 1999. Language, Education and Culture. Karachi: Oxford University Press.
- 2002. Language, Ideology and Power: Language Learning Among the Muslims of Pakistan and North India
- 2004. Denizens of Alien Worlds: A Study of Education and Polarization in Pakistan Karachi: Oxford University Press.
- 2010. Linguistics for Beginners: Basic Concepts USA: Oxford University Press
- 2011. From Hindi to Urdu: A Social and Political History. Karachi: Oxford University Press.
- 2015 Names: a Study of Personal Names, Identity, and Power in Pakistan Karachi: Oxford University Press.
- 2018 Interpretations of Jihad in South Asia: an Intellectual History Berlin and Boston: De Gruyter. Reprinted 2019, Oxford Pakistan; Orient Blackswan, New Delhi, 2020.
- 2022 Pakistan's Wars: an Alternative History London and New York: Routledge, Taylor and Francis Group, 2022; New Delhi: Routledge India, 2022; Lahore: Folio Books, 2022.
- 2024 Handbook of Mirza Ghalib's Poetry and Poetics: Commentaries and Contemporary Concerns Singapore: Springer Nature.
- 2024 Complete Short Stories of Tariq Rahman ResearchGate and Academia.edu (downloadable)
- 2024 Not the Whole Truth: the Life and Times of Tariq Rahman ResearchGate and Academia.edu (downloadable)
