= South Punjab Province movement =

Pakistani province movement

The South Punjab province movement, which largely overlaps with Saraikistan province movement, is the proposal to create a new province in Pakistan by carving out the southern regions of Punjab. Multan is usually proposed as the capital of the new province.

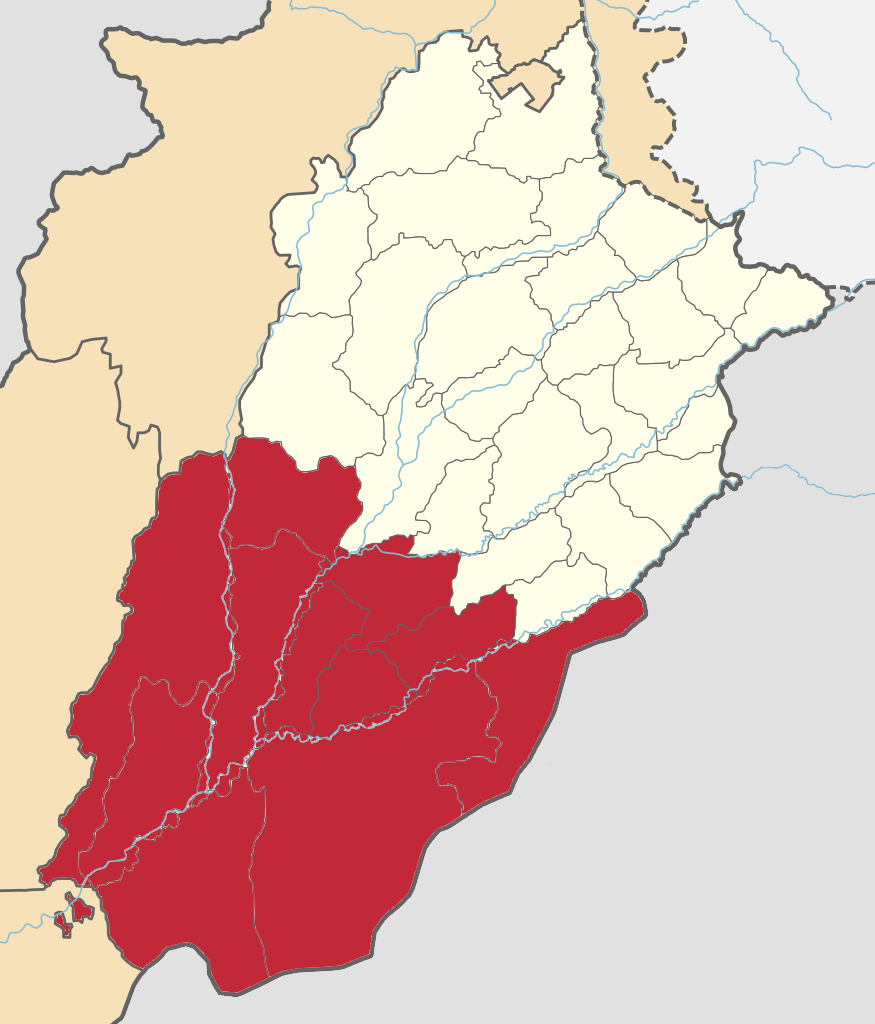
Map of the proposed province

In the political discourse within Pakistan, South Punjab generally refers to the three southern divisions of Punjab: Multan, Bahawalpur and Dera Ghazi Khan. The largest language of the three divisions is Saraiki, an Indo-Aryan language within Lahnda group, although some districts within South Punjab (notably Khanewal, Vehari and Bahawalnagar) are Punjabi majority. Conversely, some districts of Central Punjab (Mianwali and Bhakkar) and Khyber Pakhtunkhwa province (Dera Ismail Khan) are not part of South Punjab despite having Saraiki majority, and hence, not within scope of movement.

Districts with Saraiki population according to the 2023 national census

The movement for Saraiki province began in the 1970s when Saraiki-speakers demanded that the Saraiki language be officially recognized. The Pakistani government recognized the Saraiki language as a separate language under President Muhammad Zia-ul-Haq, although he kept the provincial movement in check. In 1989, Taj Langah founded the Pakistan Saraiki Party (PSP) and remained its president until his death in 2013. He was one of the foremost figures of the Saraiki province movement.

The region of southern Punjab comprises the Bahawalpur, Multan and Dera Ghazi Khan divisions. The proposed province would form about 52 percent of the total area and almost 40 percent of the population of the current Punjab province.

== History ==
=== 1960s–1990s ===
The Saraiki language movement originated in the late 1960s, later transferring into a separate province movement after the creation of the Saraiki Subha Mahaz (SSM). Although Bahawalpur was initially the headquarters of a separate province movement, Multan later became the centre of Saraiki nationalist activities. In April 1970, Saraiki activist Riyaz Hashimi, one of the leaders of anti-One Unit movement, recorded a petition in the Supreme Court, calling for the establishment of Bahawalpur province. The petition was rejected and prompted Hashimi to push for a Saraiki-dominated province and he eventually coined the term 'Saraikistan' in 1972.

The government of President Muhammad Zia-ul-Haq recognized Saraiki as an independent language, which, according to Husain Ahmad Khan, was a triumph for the Saraiki movement. However, Zia's regime did not allow the movement to air its grievances publicly. As such, the SSM supported the Pakistan People's Party (PPP) in exchange for promises that their demands would be considered if voted in. However, upon the failure to fulfil the demands, the Saraiki Subha Mahaz transformed into the Pakistan Saraiki Party (PSP). The PSP was led by prominent Saraiki activist Taj Langah until his death in 2013.

In 1989, Asghar Khan supported a Bahawalpur state and opposed the idea of a Saraiki state. In the same year, Ghaus Bakhsh Bizenjo opposed the Bahawalpur state but supported the idea of a Saraiki state.

=== 2000s–present ===
In 2012, Punjab Provincial Assembly and the National Assembly passed resolutions for the creation of a new province in Punjab. These resolutions were supported by the Pakistan People's Party (PPP) and Pakistan Muslim League (N) (PMLN) and were passed. However, the PSP rejected the term 'South Punjab' in favor of 'Saraikistan', calling for recognition of Saraiki identity. In the 2013 election, the People's Party tried to mobilize voters from southern Punjab over the creation of a separate province. But they got only one National Assembly seat from the region.

In 2018 the Pakistan Tehreek-e-Insaf (PTI) promised to create a new province in South Punjab within the first 100 days of taking office, if they win. PTI won the election and won 30 out of 50 seats of the National Assembly seats in South Punjab. On 15 August 2018, PTI MPA of Punjab Assembly, Mohsin Leghari tabled a resolution for the creation of a new province in South Punjab.

In 2019 Pakistan Muslim League-N (PML-N) tendered a constitutional amendment seeking to create two new provinces; Bahawalpur (formed from Bahawalpur division) and Janubi Punjab (formed from Dera Ghazi Khan and Multan divisions). The bill proposed that the two new provinces would have 39 and 38 National Assembly seats respectively. Each province was also proposed to have its own High Court and Provincial Assembly.

On 28 January 2022 the Senate of Pakistan accepted a bill seeking the creation of South Punjab province, and was supported by the Pakistan Tehreek-e-Insaf (PTI) and Pakistan People's Party (PPP).

In May 2026, PPP member Mumtaz Chang demanded the creation of Saraikistan in the Punjab assembly. Similarly in June 2026, PPP senator Rana Mahmood-ul-Hassan reiterated the demand for South Punjab province in the Senate.

=== Establishment of Civil Secretariat ===
In 2020, a separate civil secretariat was established for South Punjab. The secretariat was made up of Dera Ghazi Khan Division, Multan Division, and Bahawalpur Division. It became officially operational on 15 October 2020.

Initially, the following departments were included in the separate Administrative Secretariat of South Punjab region: Services and General Administration, Home, Health, Education, Agriculture, Planning and Development, Livestock and Dairy Development, Local Government and Community Development, Housing, Urban Development and Public Health, Engineering, Irrigation, Forest, Communication and Works, and Revenue, as well as Police.

In 2021, however, the Punjab government "curtailed the administrative and financial powers" of the 15 departments devolved in the Secretariat, instead being declared "attached departments" subordinate to the Punjab Civil Secretariat. It was also noted in the new rules that “the Additional Chief Secretary South Punjab, shall exercise such powers and functions as may be assigned to him by the Chief Secretary," and that Southern Secretaries were to perform their functions "as directed by the administrative secretaries in Punjab Civil Secretariat."

== Geography ==
The Saraikistan Qaumi Council demanded the creation of a province by merging 24 districts in South Punjab and 2 districts in Khyber Pakhtunkhwa (Dera Ismail Khan and Tank districts). It has also been proposed to create instead two provinces in South Punjab.

The main political parties PTI, PPP, and PML(N) have differences in the geography of the proposed province. The PPP has supported the formation of the South province by merging 15 districts of Punjab and as well as Dera Ismail Khan and Tank districts of Khyber Pakhtunkhwa. The PTI supports the formation of the South Punjab province by merging 13 districts of South Punjab only. The PML(N) does not much support the division of Punjab into two separate provinces, but rather three.

== Proposed divisions ==
The administrative divisions of the current secretariat:

| Name of Division | Name of District | Headquarter |
|---|---|---|
| Multan | 1. Multan; 2. Khanewal; 3. Lodhran; 4. Vehari | Multan |
| Bahawalpur | 1. Bahawalpur; 2. Bahawalnagar; 3. Rahim Yar Khan | Bahawalpur |
| Dera Ghazi Khan | 1. Dera Ghazi Khan; 2. Muzaffargarh; 3. Layyah; 4. Rajanpur; 5. Kot Addu; 6. Tonsa | Dera Ghazi Khan |

== Demographics ==
=== Language ===
The most common language spoken in Southern Punjab is Saraiki. Urdu is the official lingua franca.

=== Religion ===
Islam is the dominant religion in Southern Punjab, with a Sunni majority.

== See also ==
- Karachi Province movement

== Bibliography ==
- Rahman, Tariq (1995). "The Siraiki Movement in Pakistan". Language Problems & Language Planning. 19 (1): 1–25. doi:10.1075/lplp.19.1.01rah.
