= Saraiki language =

Indo-Aryan language spoken in Pakistan

Saraiki
- سرائیکی
- Saraiki in Shahmukhi script (Nastaʿlīq style)
- Native to: Pakistan
- Region: Southern Punjab; Southern Khyber Pakhtunkhwa; Northern Sindh
- Ethnicity: Saraikis
- Native speakers: 28.84 million
- Language family: Indo-European: Indo-Iranian; Indo-Aryan; Northwestern; Punjabi; Lahnda; Saraiki
- Writing system: Shahmukhi (Saraiki alphabet); Gurmukhi

Language codes
- ISO 639-3: skr
- Glottolog: sera1259
- The proportion of people with Saraiki as their mother tongue in each Pakistani District as of the 2017 Pakistan Census

Saraiki ( سرائیکی, Sarā'īkī, [səɾaːiːkiː]; also spelt Siraiki, or Seraiki) is an Indo-Aryan language of the Lahnda group. It is spoken by 28.84 million people, as per the 2023 Pakistani census, mostly in southern Punjab, northern Sindh and southern Khyber Pakhtunkhwa.

Saraiki has partial mutual intelligibility with Standard Punjabi, and it shares with it a large portion of its vocabulary and morphology. At the same time in its phonology it is radically different (particularly in the lack of tones, the preservation of the voiced aspirates and the development of implosive consonants), and has important grammatical features in common with the Sindhi language spoken to the south.

Due to the effects of dominant languages in Pakistani media like Urdu, Standard Punjabi and English and the religious impact of Arabic and Persian, Saraiki, like other regional language varieties of Pakistan, is continuously expanding its vocabulary base with loan words.

== Name ==
The present extent of the meaning of Sirāikī is a recent development, and the term most probably gained its currency during the nationalist movement of the 1960s. It has been in use for much longer in Sindh to refer to the speech of the immigrants from the north, principally Siraiki-speaking Baloch tribes who settled there between the 16th and the 19th centuries. In this context, the term can most plausibly be explained as originally having had the meaning "the language of the north", from the Sindhi word siro 'up-river, north'. This name can ambiguously refer to the northern dialects of Sindhi, but these are nowadays more commonly known as "Siroli" or "Sireli".

An alternative hypothesis is that Sarākī originated in the word sauvīrā, or Sauvira, an ancient kingdom which was also mentioned in the Sanskrit epic Mahabharata.

Currently, the most common rendering of the name is Saraiki. (Note: Saraiki is the spelling used in universities of Pakistan (the Islamia University of Bahawalpur, department of Saraiki established in 1989, Bahauddin Zakariya University, in Multan, department of Saraiki established in 2006, and Allama Iqbal Open University, in Islamabad, department of Pakistani languages established in 1998), and by the district governments of Bahawalpur and Multan, as well as by the federal institutions of the Government of Pakistan like Population Census Organization and Pakistan Broadcasting Corporation.) However, Seraiki and Siraiki have also been used in academia until recently. Precise spelling aside, the name was first adopted in the 1960s by regional social and political leaders.

== Classification and related languages ==
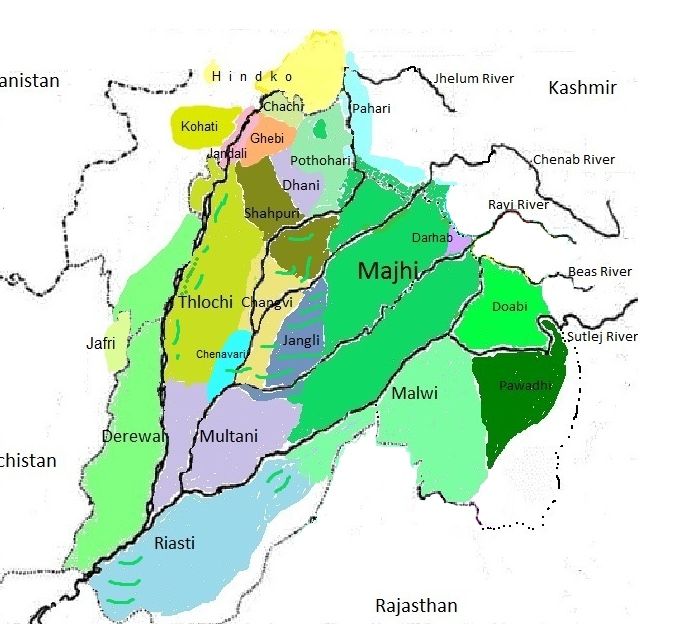
Map of Punjabi dialects and language varieties, including Saraiki (Multani, Riasti and Derawali) in the south-west

Saraiki is a member of Lahnda sub family of the Indo-Aryan subdivision of the Indo-Iranian branch of the Indo-European language family.

In 1919, George Abraham Grierson maintained that the dialects of what is now the southwest of Punjab Province in Pakistan constitute a dialect cluster, which he designated "Southern Lahnda" within a putative "Lahnda language". Subsequent Indo-Aryanist linguists have confirmed the reality of this dialect cluster, even while rejecting the name "Southern Lahnda" along with the entity "Lahnda" itself. Grierson also maintained that "Lahnda" was his novel designation for various dialects up to then called "Western Punjabi", spoken north, west, and south of Lahore. The local dialect of Lahore is the Majhi dialect of Punjabi, which has long been the basis of standard literary Punjabi. However, outside of Indo-Aryanist circles, the concept of "Lahnda" is still found in compilations of the world's languages (e.g. Ethnologue). Saraiki appears to be a transitional language between Punjabi and Sindhi. Spoken in Upper Sindh as well as the southern Panjab, it is sometimes considered a dialect of either Sindhi or of Panjabi due to a high degree of mutual intelligibility.

=== Dialects ===
The following dialects have been tentatively proposed for Saraiki:

- Central Saraiki, including Multani: spoken in the districts of Dera Ghazi Khan, Muzaffargarh, Leiah, Multan, Bahawalpur and Taunsa.
- Southern Saraiki: prevalent in the districts of Rajanpur and Rahimyar Khan.
- Sindh Siraiki: dispersed throughout the Northern Sindh and in Kachhi Plain region in Balochistan province.
- Northern Saraiki, or Thali: spoken in the district of Dera Ismail Khan and the northern parts of the Thal region, including Mianwali and Bhakkar districts.

The historical inventory of names for the dialects now called Saraiki is a confusion of overlapping or conflicting ethnic, local, and regional designations. One historical name for Saraiki, Jaṭki, means "of the Jaṭṭs", a northern South Asian ethnic group. Only a small minority of Saraiki speakers are Jaṭṭs, and not all Saraiki speaking Jaṭṭs necessarily speak the same dialect of Saraiki. However, these people usually call their traditions as well as language as Jataki. Conversely, several Saraiki dialects have multiple names corresponding to different locales or demographic groups. The name "Derawali" is used to refer to the local dialects of both Dera Ghazi Khan and Dera Ismail Khan, but "Ḍerawali" in the former is the Multani dialect and "Derawali" in the latter is the Thaḷi dialect.

When consulting sources before 2000, it is important to know that Pakistani administrative boundaries have been altered frequently. Provinces in Pakistan are divided into districts, and sources on "Saraiki" often describe the territory of a dialect or dialect group according to the districts. Since the founding of Pakistan in 1947, several of these districts have been subdivided, some multiple times.

=== Status of language or dialect ===
In the context of South Asia, the choice between the appellations "language" and "dialect" is a difficult one, and any distinction made using these terms is obscured by their ambiguity. In a sense both Saraiki and Standard Panjabi are "dialects" of a "Greater Punjabi" macrolanguage. The term "Saraiki" was first introduced for the Multani, Riasti and Derawali dialects of this "Greater Punjabi" macrolanguage in the 1960s as a result of a sociopolitical movement. According to Pakistani politicians such as Hanif Ramay and Fakhar Zaman, the Saraiki linguistic movement was thought to have been pushed by feudal landowners of the Seraiki belt.

Saraiki was considered a dialect of Punjabi by most British colonial administrators, and is still seen as such by many Punjabis. Saraikis, however, consider it a language in its own right and see the use of the term "dialect" as stigmatising. A language movement was started in the 1960s to standardise a script and promote the language. The national census of Pakistan has tabulated the prevalence of Saraiki speakers since 1981.

== Geographical distribution ==
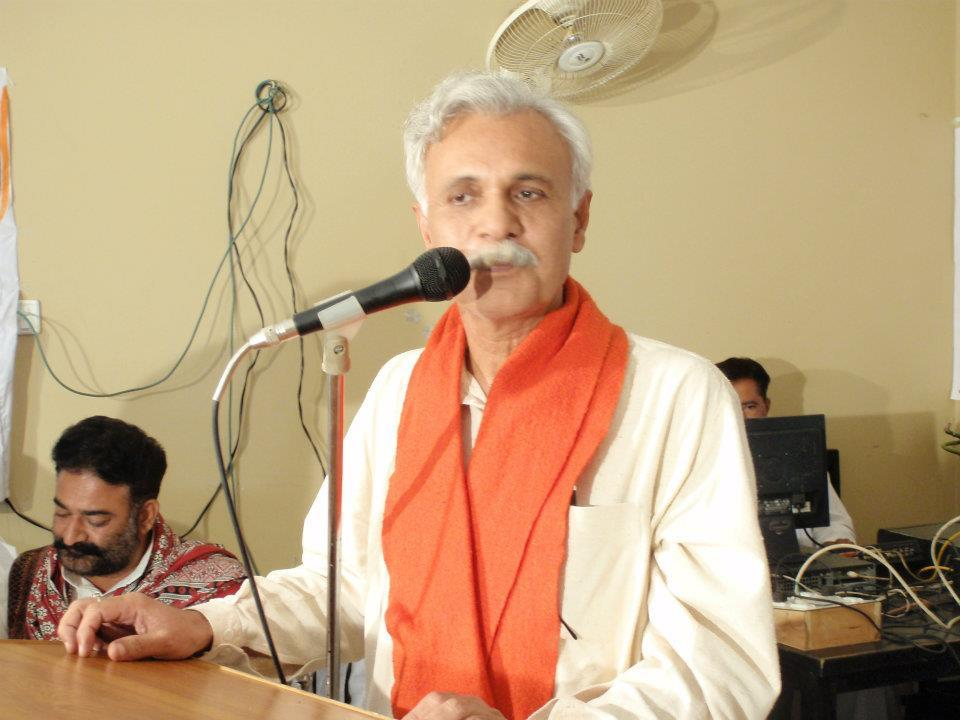
Ashu Lal, A Saraiki poet and intellectual

=== Pakistan ===
Saraiki is primarily spoken in the south-western part of the province of Punjab, in an area that broadly coincides with the extent of the proposed South Punjab Province. To the west, it is set off from the Pashto- and Balochi-speaking areas by the Suleiman Range, while to the south-east the Thar desert divides it from the Marwari language. Its other boundaries are less well-defined: Punjabi is spoken to the east; Sindhi is found to the south, after the border with Sindh province; to the north, the southern edge of the Salt Range is the rough divide with the northern varieties of Lahnda, such as Pothwari.

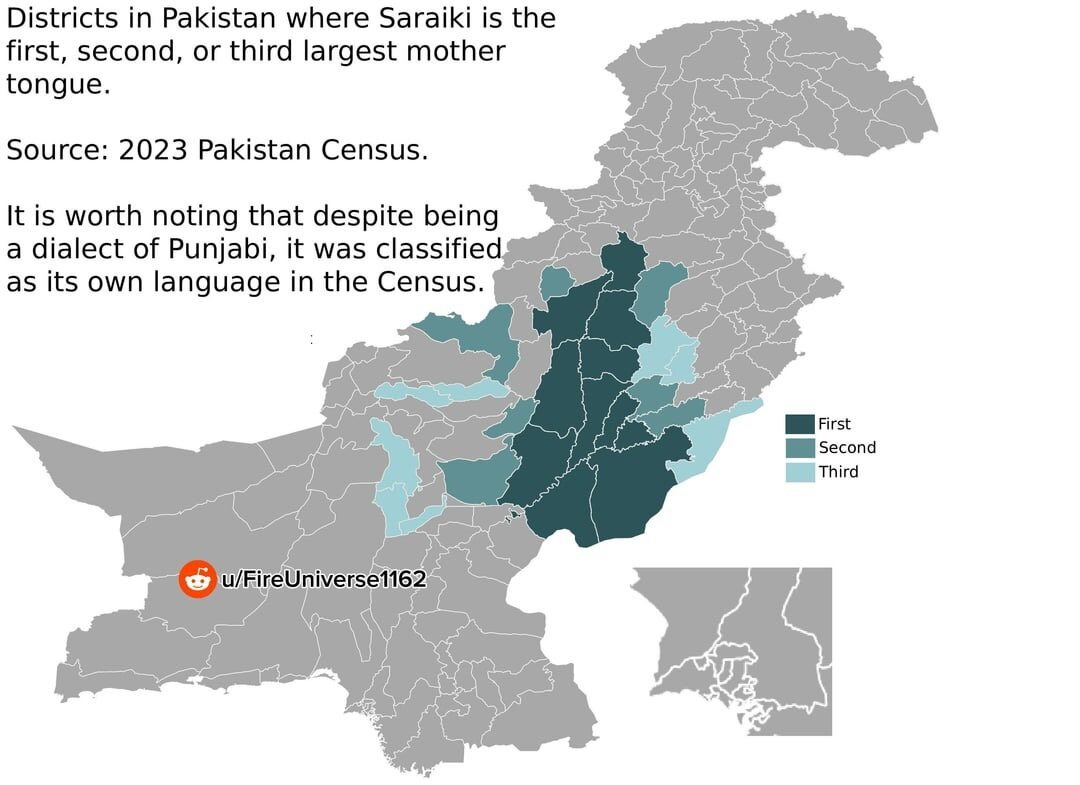
Saraiki as a first, second, and third largest mother tongue by district in Pakistan.

Saraiki is the first language of approximately 29 million people in Pakistan according to the 2023 census. The first national census of Pakistan to gather data on the prevalence of Saraiki was the census of 1981. In that year, the percentage of respondents nationwide reporting Saraiki as their native language was 9.83. In the census of 1998, it was 10.53% out of a national population of 132 million, for a figure of 13.9 million Saraiki speakers resident in Pakistan. Also according to the 1998 census, 12.8 million of those, or 92%, lived in the province of Punjab.

=== India ===
After Partition in 1947, Hindu and Sikh speakers of Saraiki migrated to India, where they are currently widely dispersed, though with more significant pockets in the states of Punjab, Haryana, Rajasthan, Uttar Pradesh, Delhi and Jammu and Kashmir. There is also a smaller group of Muslim pastoralists who migrated to India, specifically Andhra Pradesh, prior to Partition.

There are census figures available – for example, in the 2011 census, 29,000 people reported their language as "Bahawal Puri", and 62,000 as "Hindi Multani". However, these are not representative of the actual numbers, as the speakers will often refer to their language using narrower dialect or regional labels, or alternatively identify with the bigger language communities, like those of Punjabi, Hindi or Urdu. Therefore, the number of speakers in India remains unknown. There have been observations of Lahnda varieties "merging" into Punjabi (especially in Punjab and Delhi), as well as of outright shift to the dominant languages of Punjabi or Hindi. One pattern reported in the 1990s was for members of the younger generation to speak the respective "Lahnda" variety with their grandparents, while communicating within the peer group in Punjabi and speaking to their children in Hindi.

== Phonology ==
Saraiki's consonant inventory is similar to that of neighbouring Sindhi. It includes phonemically distinctive implosive consonants, which are unusual among the Indo-European languages. In Christopher Shackle's analysis, Saraiki distinguishes up to 48 consonants and 9 monophthong vowels.

=== Vowels ===
The "centralised" (Note: The terms "centralised" and "peripheral" are used in Shackle 1976 and Shackle 2003.) vowels /ɪ ʊ ə/ tend to be shorter than the "peripheral" vowels /i ɛ a o u/. The central vowel /ə/ is more open and back than the corresponding vowel in neighbouring varieties. Vowel nasalisation is distinctive: /'ʈuɾẽ/ 'may you go' vs. /'ʈuɾe/ 'may he go'. Before /ɦ/, the contrast between /a/ and /ə/ is neutralised. There is a high number of vowel sequences, some of which can be analysed as diphthongs.

Saraiki vowels (Note: The symbols used follow Shackle (2003). Shackle (1976) has ʌ for ə and æ for ɛ.)
	Front	Near-front	Central	Near-back	Back
Close	i				u
Near-close		ɪ		ʊ	
Mid	e				o
Near-open	ɛ		ə		
Open			a		

=== Consonants ===
Saraiki possesses a large inventory of consonants:

		Labial	Dental/ Alveolar	Retroflex	Post-alv./ Palatal	Velar	Glottal
Stop/ Affricate	voiceless	p	t̪	ʈ	t͡ʃ	k	
Stop/ Affricate	aspirated	pʰ	t̪ʰ	ʈʰ	t͡ʃʰ	kʰ	
Stop/ Affricate	voiced	b	d̪	ɖ	d͡ʒ	ɡ	
Stop/ Affricate	voiced aspirated	bʱ	d̪ʱ	ɖʱ	d͡ʒʱ	ɡʱ	
Stop/ Affricate	implosive	ɓ		ᶑ	ʄ	ɠ	
Nasal	plain	m	n	ɳ	ɲ	ŋ	
Nasal	aspirated	mʱ	nʱ	ɳʱ			
Fricative	voiceless	f	s		ʃ	x	
Fricative	voiced	v	z			ɣ	ɦ
Fricative	voiced aspirated	vʱ					
Tap	plain		ɾ	ɽ			
Tap	aspirated		ɾʱ	ɽʱ			
Approximant	plain		l		j		
Approximant	aspirated		lʱ				

In its stop consonants, Saraiki has the typical for Indo-Aryan four-fold contrast between voiced and voiceless, and aspirated and unaspirated. In parallel to Sindhi it has additionally developed a set of implosives, so that for each place of articulation there are up to five contrasting stops, for example: voiceless /tʃala/ 'custom' ~ aspirated /tʃʰala/ 'blister' ~ implosive /ʄala/ 'cobweb' ~ voiced /dʒala/ 'niche' ~ voiced aspirate /dʒʰəɠ/ 'foam'.

There are five contrasting places of articulation for the stops: velar, palatal, retroflex, dental and bilabial. The dentals /t tʰ d dʰ/ are articulated with the blade of the tongue against the surface behind the teeth. The retroflex stops are post-alveolar, the articulator being the tip of the tongue or sometimes the underside. There is no dental implosive, partly due to the lesser retroflexion with which the retroflex implosive /ᶑ/ is pronounced. The palatal stops are here somewhat arbitrarily represented with [tʃ] and [dʒ]. (Note: They are transcribed as such by Awan, Baseer & Sheeraz (2012, p. 127). Latif (2003, p. 91) reports that these consonants have similar spectrograms to those of Urdu. Shackle (1976, p. 22) has them as pre-palatal. None of these sources discuss the issue at length.) In casual speech some of the stops, especially /k/, /g/ and /dʒ/, are frequently rendered as fricatives – respectively [x], [ɣ] and [z].

Of the nasals, only /n/ and /m/ are found at the start of a word, but in other phonetic environments there is a full set of contrasts in the place of articulation: /ŋ ɲ ɳ n m/. The retroflex ɳ is realised as a true nasal only if adjacent to a retroflex stop, elsewhere it is a nasalised retroflex flap [ɽ̃]. The contrasts /ŋ/ ~ /ŋɡ/, and /ɲ/ ~ /ɲdʒ/ are weak; the single nasal is more common in southern varieties, and the nasal + stop cluster is prevalent in central dialects. Three nasals /ŋ n m/ have aspirated counterparts /ŋʰ nʰ mʰ/.

The realisation of the alveolar tap /ɾ/ varies with the phonetic environment. It is trilled if geminated to /ɾɾ/ and weakly trilled if preceded by /t/ or /d/. It contrasts with the retroflex flap /ɽ/ (/taɾ/ 'wire' ~ /taɽ/ 'watching'), except in the variety spoken by Hindus. The fricatives /f v/ are labio-dental. The glottal fricative /ɦ/ is voiced and affects the voice quality of a preceding vowel.

=== Phonotactics and stress ===
There are no tones in Saraiki. All consonants except /h j ɳ ɽ/ can be geminated ("doubled"). Geminates occur only after stressed centralised vowels, and are phonetically realised much less markedly than in the rest of the Punjabi area.

A stressed syllable is distinguished primarily by its length: if the vowel is peripheral /i ɛ a o u/ then it is lengthened, and if it is a "centralised vowel" (/ɪ ʊ ə/) then the consonant following it is geminated. Stress normally falls on the first syllable of a word. The stress will, however, fall on the second syllable of a two-syllable word if the vowel in the first syllable is centralised, and the second syllable contains either a diphthong, or a peripheral vowel followed by a consonant, for example /dɪɾ'kʰan/ 'carpenter'. Three-syllable words are stressed on the second syllable if the first syllable contains a centralised vowel, and the second syllable has either a peripheral vowel, or a centralised vowel + geminate, for example /tʃʊ'həttəɾ/ 'seventy-four'. There are exceptions to these rules and they account for minimal pairs like /it'la/ 'informing' and /'itla/ 'so much'.

=== Implosives ===
Unusually for South Asian languages, implosive consonants are found in Sindhi, possibly some Rajasthani dialects, and Saraiki, which has the following series: /ɓ ᶑ ʄ ɠ/.

The "palatal" /ʄ/ is denti-alveolar and laminal, articulated further forward than most other palatals. (Note: Bahl (1936, p. 28) describes its place of articulation as almost identical to the ⟨d'⟩ [ɟ] of Czech.)

The "retroflex" /ᶑ/ is articulated with the tip or the underside of the tongue, further forward in the mouth than the plain retroflex stops. It has been described as post-alveolar, pre-palatal or pre-retroflex. Bahl (1936, p. 30) reports that this sound is unique in Indo-Aryan and that speakers of Multani take pride in its distinctiveness. The plain voiced /ɖ/ and the implosive /ᶑ/ are mostly in complementary distribution although there are a few minimal pairs, like /ɖakʈəɾ/ 'doctor' ~ /ᶑak/ 'mail'. The retroflex implosive alternates with the plain voiced dental stop /d/ in the genitive postposition/suffix /da/, which takes the form of /ᶑa/ when combined with 1st or 2nd person pronouns: /meᶑa/ 'my', /teᶑa/ 'your'.

A dental implosive (/ɗ̪/) is found in the northeastern Jhangi dialect, considered transitional between Standard Punjabi and Saraiki by Wagha (1997, p. 229), which is characterised by a lack of phonemic contrast between implosives and plain stops, and a preference for implosives even in words where Saraiki has a plain stop. The dental implosive in Jhangi is articulated with the tongue completely covering the upper teeth. It is not present in Saraiki, although Bahl (1936, p. 29) contends that it should be reconstructed for the earlier language. Its absence has been attributed to structural factors: the forward articulation of /ʄ/ and the lesser retroflexion of /ᶑ/.

Aspirated (breathy voiced) implosives occur word-initially, where they contrast with aspirated plain stops: /ɓʰɛ(h)/ 'sit' ~ /bʰɛ/ 'fear'. The aspiration is not phonemic; it is phonetically realised on the whole syllable, and results from an underlying /h/ that follows the vowel, thus [ɓʰɛh] is phonemically /ɓɛh/.

The historical origin of the Saraiki implosives has been on the whole (Note: Saraiki differs for example in the presence of geminated implosives, or the treatment of Sanskrit vy-, whose Saraiki reflex /ɓ/ contrasts with the Sindhi /w/.(Bahl 1936, pp. 57–64)) the same as in Sindhi. Their source has generally been the older language's series of plain voiced stops, thus Sanskrit janayati > Saraiki ʄəɲən 'be born'. New plain voiced stops have in turn arisen out of certain consonants and consonant clusters (for example, yava > dʒao 'barley'), or have been introduced in loanwords from Sanskrit, Hindi, Persian or English (ɡərdən 'throat', bəs 'bus'). The following table illustrates some of the major developments:

Sanskrit/ Prakrit	Saraiki	example word (Note: Sanskrit words are transliterated using IAST. An asterisk * denotes an unattested but reconstructed form.)
b-	ɓ	bahu > ɓəhʊ̃ 'many'
dv-	ɓ	dvitiya- > ɓja 'another'
v-	ɓ	vṛddhā > ɓuɖɖʱa 'old'
v-	b	vaṇa- > bən 'forest'
v-	v	vartman- > vaʈ 'path'
j	ʄ	jihvā > ʄɪbbʰ 'tongue'
jy-	ʄ	jyeṣṭhā > ʄeʈʰ 'husband's elder brother'
-jy-	ʄʄ	rajyate > rəʄʄəɲ 'to satisfy'
-dy-	ʄʄ	adya > əʄʄ^{ə} 'today'
y-	dʒ	yadi > dʒe 'if'
ḍ-	ᶑ	Pk. gaḍḍaha- > gəᶑᶑũ 'donkey'
d-	ᶑ	duḥkha > ᶑʊkkʰ^{ə} 'sorrow'
-rd-	ᶑᶑ	kūrdati > kʊᶑᶑəɲ 'to jump'
-dāt-	ᶑᶑ	*kadātana > kəᶑᶑəɳ 'when'
-bdh-	ɖɖ	stabdha > ʈʰəɖɖa 'cold'
-ṇḍ-	ɳɖ	ḍaṇḍaka > ᶑəɳɖa 'stick'
g	ɠ	gāva- > ɠã 'cow'
gr-	ɠ	grantha > ɠəɳɖʰ 'knot'
gr-	ɡ	grāma > ɡrã 'village'

Within South Asia, implosives were first described for Sindhi by Stake in 1855. Later authors have noted their existence in Multani and have variously called them "recursives" or "injectives", while Grierson incorrectly treated them as "double consonants".

== Writing system ==
In the province of Punjab, Saraiki is written using the Arabic-derived Urdu alphabet with the addition of seven diacritically modified letters to represent the implosives and the extra nasals. (Note: The practice is traced back to Juke's 1900 dictionary. The modern standard was agreed upon in 1979 (Wagha 1997, pp. 240–41).) In Sindh the Sindhi alphabet is used. The calligraphic styles used are Naskh and Nastaʿlīq.

Historically, traders or bookkeepers wrote in a script known as kiṛakkī or laṇḍā, although use of this script has been significantly reduced in recent times. Likewise, a script related to the Landa scripts family, known as Multani, was previously used to write Saraiki. A preliminary proposal to encode the Multani script in ISO/IEC 10646 was submitted in 2011. Saraiki Unicode has been approved in 2005. The Khojiki script has also been in use, whereas Devanagari and Gurmukhi are not employed any more.

== Language use ==
=== In academia ===
The Department of Saraiki, Islamia University, Bahawalpur was established in 1989 and the Department of Saraiki, Bahauddin Zakariya University, Multan was established in 2006. BS Saraiki is also being offered by English department of Ghazi University, Dera Ghazi Khan and MA Saraiki is being offered by Gomal University, Dera Ismail Khan privately. It is taught as a subject in schools and colleges at higher secondary and intermediate. Saraiki is also taught at degree level at the Allama Iqbal Open University at Islamabad, and the Al-Khair University at Bhimbir have Pakistani Linguistics Departments. They offer M.Phil. and Ph.D in Saraiki. The Associated Press of Pakistan has launched a Saraiki version of its site, as well.

=== Arts and literature ===
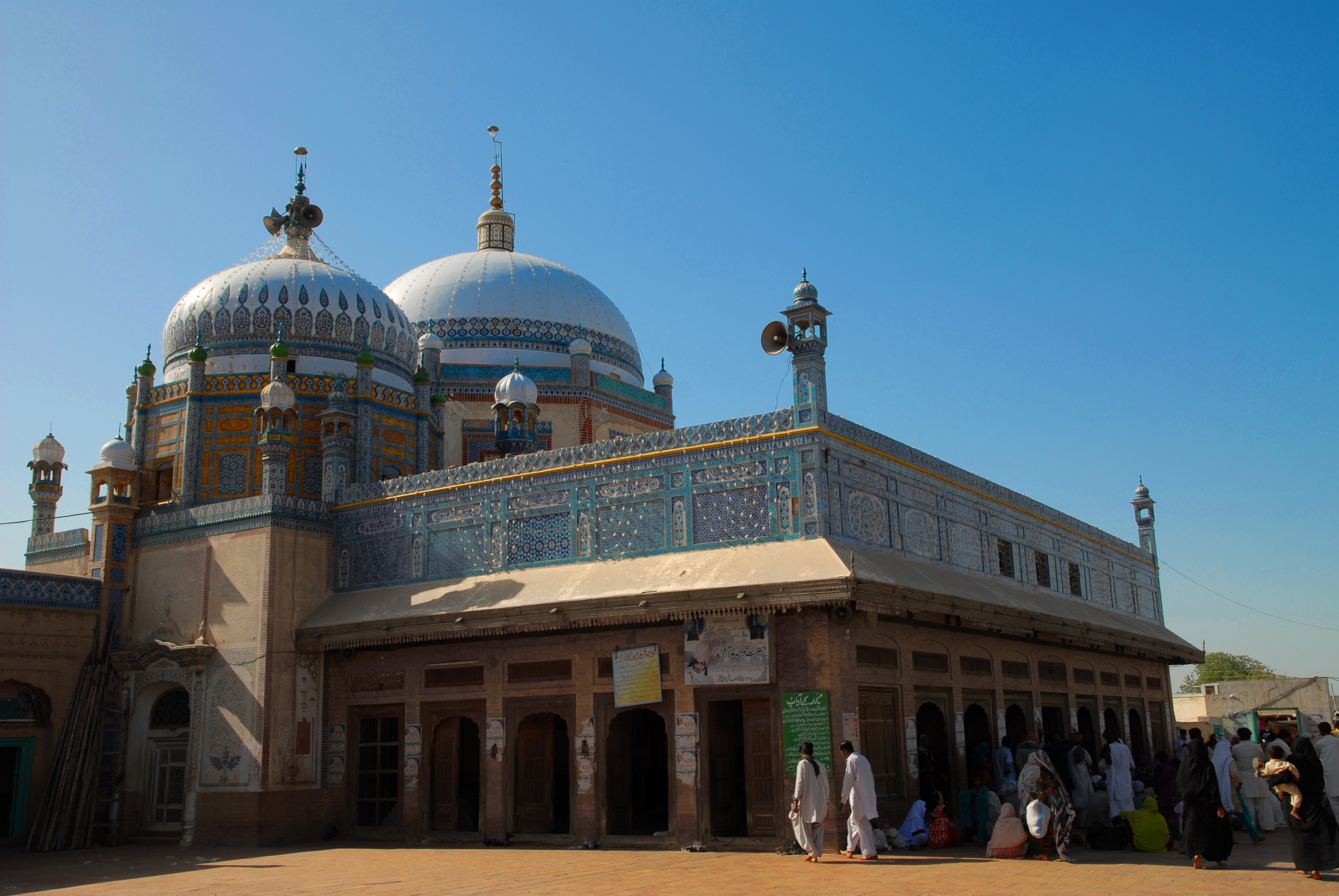
Tomb of Sufi poet Khwaja Ghulam Farid

The language, partly codified during the British Raj, derived its emotional attraction from the poetry of the Sufi saint, Khawaja Ghulam Farid, who has become an identity symbol. His poems, known as Kafi are still famous.

The beloved's intense glances call for blood
The dark hair wildly flows The Kohl of the eyes is fiercely black
And slays the lovers with no excuse
My appearance in ruins, I sit and wait
While the beloved has settled in Malheer I feel the sting of the cruel dart
My heart the, abode of pain and grief A life of tears, I have led Farid

— one of Khwaja Ghulam Farid's poems (translated)

Shakir Shujabadi (Kalam-e-Shakir, Khuda Janey, Shakir Diyan Ghazlan, Peelay Patr, Munafqan Tu Khuda Bachaway, and Shakir De Dohray are his famous books) is a very well recognised modern poet.

Ataullah Khan Esakhelvi and Shafaullah Rokhri are considered legends of Saraiki music and the most popular singers from the Saraiki belt.

=== Media ===
==== Television channels ====
Former Pakistan Prime Minister Yousaf Raza Gillani had said southern Punjab is rich in cultural heritage which needs to be promoted for next generations. In a message on the launch of Saraiki channel by Pakistan Television (PTV) in Multan, he is reported to have said that the step would help promote the rich heritage of 'Saraiki Belt'.

TV Channel	Genre	Founded
Waseb TV (وسیب ٹی وی)	Entertainment	
Kook TV (کوک ٹی وی)	Entertainment	
Rohi TV (روہی ٹی وی)	Entertainment	
PTV Multan (پی ٹی وی ملتان)	Entertainment	
PTV National (پی ٹی وی نیشنل)	Entertainment	

==== Radio ====
These are not dedicated Saraiki channels but most play programmes in Saraiki.

Radio Channel	Genre	Founded
FM105 Saraiki Awaz Sadiq Abad	Entertainment	

== See also ==
- Saraikistan province movement
- Saraiki people
- List of Saraiki people
- Saraiki culture
- Saraiki cuisine
- Saraiki literature
- Saraiki diaspora

== Bibliography ==
- Asif, Saiqa Imtiaz. 2005. Siraiki Language and Ethnic Identity. Journal of Research (Faculty of Languages and Islamic Studies), 7: 9-17. Multan (Pakistan): Bahauddin Zakariya University.
- Awan, Muhammad Safeer; Baseer, Abdul; Sheeraz, Muhammad (2012). "Outlining Saraiki Phonetics: A Comparative Study of Saraiki and English Sound System" (PDF). Language in India. 12 (7): 120–136. ISSN 1930-2940.
- Bahl, Parmanand (1936). Étude de phonetique historique et experimentale des consonnes injectives du Multani, dialecte panjabi occidental. Paris: Adrien-Maisonneuve.
- Bashir, Elena; Conners, Thomas J.; Hefright, Brook (2019). A descriptive grammar of Hindko, Panjabi, and Saraiki. Hefright, Brook. De Gruyter Mouton. pp. 62, 77. ISBN 978-1-61451-296-7. OCLC 1062344143.
- Bhatia, Motia (2016). "Lahanda". In Devy, Ganesh; Koul, Omkar N.; Bhat, Roop Krishen (eds.). The Languages of Punjab. People's Linguistic Survey of India. Vol. 24. Hyderabad: Orient Blackswan. pp. 134–57. ISBN 978-8125062400.
- Dani, A.H. (1981). "Sindhu – Sauvira : A glimpse into the early history of Sind". In Khuhro, Hamida (ed.). Sind through the centuries : proceedings of an international seminar held in Karachi in Spring 1975. Karachi: Oxford University Press. pp. 35–42. ISBN 978-0-19-577250-0.
- Gardezi, Hassan N. (1996). "Saraiki Language and its poetics: An Introduction". Archived from the original on 21 April 2009.
- Goswami, Krishan Kumar (1994). Code switching in Lahanda speech community : a sociolinguistic survey. Delhi: Kalinga Publications. ISBN 818516357X.
- Grierson, George A. (1919). Linguistic Survey of India. Vol. VIII, Part 1, Indo-Aryan family. North-western group. Specimens of Sindhī and Lahndā. Calcutta: Office of the Superintendent of Government Printing, India.
- Javaid, Umbreen (2004). "Saraiki political movement: its impact in south Punjab" (PDF). Journal of Research (Humanities). 40 (2). Lahore: Department of English Language & Literature, University of the Punjab: 45–55. (This PDF contains multiple articles from the same issue.)
- Latif, Amna (2003). "Phonemic Inventory of Siraiki Language and Acoustic Analysis of Voiced Implosives" (PDF). CRULP Annual Student Report, 2002-2003. Center for Research in Urdu Language Processing.
- Lewis, M. Paul; Simons, Gary F.; Fennig, Charles D., eds. (2016). "Saraiki". Ethnologue (19 ed.). Archived from the original on 25 April 2019.
- Masica, Colin P. (1991). The Indo-Aryan languages. Cambridge language surveys. Cambridge University Press. ISBN 978-0-521-23420-7.
- Rahman, Tariq (1995). "The Siraiki Movement in Pakistan". Language Problems & Language Planning. 19 (1): 1–25. doi:10.1075/lplp.19.1.01rah.
- —— (1996). Language and politics in Pakistan. Oxford University Press. ISBN 978-0-19-577692-8.
- —— (1997). "Language and Ethnicity in Pakistan". Asian Survey. 37 (9): 833–839. doi:10.2307/2645700. ISSN 0004-4687. JSTOR 2645700.
- Shackle, Christopher (1976). The Siraiki language of central Pakistan : a reference grammar. London: School of Oriental and African Studies.
- —— (1977). "Siraiki: A Language Movement in Pakistan". Modern Asian Studies. 11 (3): 379–403. doi:10.1017/s0026749x00014190. ISSN 0026-749X. JSTOR 311504. S2CID 144829301.
- —— (2003). "Panjabi". In Cardona, George; Jain, Dhanesh (eds.). The Indo-Aryan languages. Routledge language family series. Y. London: Routledge. pp. 581–621. ISBN 978-0-7007-1130-7.
- —— (2007). "Pakistan". In Simpson, Andrew (ed.). Language and national identity in Asia. Oxford linguistics Y. Oxford University Press. ISBN 978-0-19-922648-1.
- —— (2014a). "Lahnda language". Encyclopædia Britannica.
- —— (2014b). "Siraiki language". Encyclopædia Britannica.
- Wagha, Muhammad Ahsan (1997). The development of Siraiki language in Pakistan (Ph.D.). School of Oriental and African Studies. Archived from the original on 14 February 2017.
