= Allama Iqbal Open University =

National university in Islamabad, Pakistan

- علامہ اقبال اوپن یونیورسٹی
- Other name: AIOU
- Motto: 'Education for All'
- Type: Public
- Established: 1974; 52 years ago
- Affiliations: Higher Education Commission (Pakistan); Pakistan Engineering Council
- Endowment: Government of Pakistan
- Chancellor: President of Pakistan
- Vice-Chancellor: Prof. Dr. Nasir Mahmood
- Academic staff: 2899
- Students: 1,326,266
- Location: Islamabad-44000, Pakistan; 33.68285319081896°N 73.05725156600758°E
- Campus: Urban
- Colours: Sky blue, orange, white
- Website: aiou.edu.pk

Allama Iqbal Open University is a national university in Islamabad, Pakistan. It is named after Allama Muhammad Iqbal, the country's national poet. It is the world's fifth largest institution of higher learning in terms of enrollment, with an annual enrollment of 1,121,038 students (as of 2010); the majority are women, and the course enrollment is 3,305,948 (2011). Students can gain admission to Matriculation, Intermediate, Bachelor, Master, MPhil and Ph.D. programmes at the university.

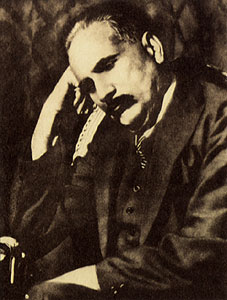
Allama Muhammad Iqbal, then president of the Muslim League in 1930 and address deliverer

The university has 44 regional campuses and centers throughout Pakistan, including in Faisalabad, Multan, Dera Ghazi Khan, Dera Ismail Khan, Bahawalpur and Rahim Yar Khan.

== Objectives and mission ==
Established in May 1974 under Act No. XXXIX passed by the Parliament of Pakistan, it is Asia's first open university with a strong emphasis on providing distance education in philosophy, natural science and social sciences. It has the most applicants per year of any university in Pakistan.

AIOU offers extensive undergraduate and post-graduate programs in academic disciplines. After witnessing the success of the Open University in the United Kingdom, AIOU was established as a public university in 1974.

AIOU is noted for its cost-effective policy to provide higher and lifelong education to people learning from their homes and places of work at a minimum cost through a specialised fund managed by the government.

AIOU is open to everyone and provides education to all without any discrimination.

== Administration and governance ==
- Chancellor (President of Pakistan)
- Pro-Chancellor (Federal Minister for Education, Ministry of Federal Education and Professional Training)
- Vice-Chancellor (Chief Executive Officer/Head of the institution)
- Executive Council (Governing Body)

== Faculties and departments ==
=== Faculty of Arabic and Islamic Studies ===
Established in 1974, the faculty was upgraded to the Faculty of Arabic and Islamic Studies in 1998, with the following departments:

- Arabic Language and Literature
- Hadith and Seerah
- Islamic Law (Fiqh)
- Islamic Thought, History and Culture
- Qur'an and Tafseer

The Faculty of Arabic and Islamic Studies also operates an Indexing and Abstracting Agency "Islamic Research Index". The Islamic Research Index is the first and largest repository of Arabic and Islamic Studies Research Journals.

=== Faculty of Education ===
Established in 1984, the Faculty of Education's origin predates the university. A National Institute of Education was established in 1973 as a part of the Federal Ministry of Education, to improve education at school levels through in-service training of Master Trainers. This institute became a part of the university in June 1975.

The Faculty of Education has the following departments:

- Adult and Continuing Education
- Distance and Non-Formal Education
- Educational Planning and Management
- Science Education
- Special Education
- Teacher Education (Secondary)
- Teacher Education (Elementary)

=== Faculty of Sciences ===
Renamed as Faculty of Sciences, the Faculty of Basic and Applied Sciences was established in 1982. It comprises the following nine departments:

- Agricultural Sciences
- Biology
- Botany
- Chemistry
- Information Technology
- Computer Science
- Engineering and Technology (Bachelor of Engineering in Telecommunications)
- Environmental Sciences
- Home and Health Sciences
- Mathematics and Statistics
- Physics
- Telecommunications

=== Faculty of Social Sciences and Humanities ===
The Faculty of Social Sciences and Humanities was established in 1982. The 16 departments of the faculty are:

- Business Administration
- Management Sciences
- Commerce
- Economics
- English Language and Applied Linguistics
- History
- Iqbal Studies
- Library and information sciences
- Mass Communication
- Pakistan Studies
- Pakistani languages
- Sociology, Social Work and Population Studies
- Gender and Women's Studies

=== Future goals of AIOU ===
- BS (4-Years) Specialization in Distance
- Non-Formal and Continuing Education
- Postgraduate Diploma in Educational Technology
- Postgraduate Diplomas in Distance Education
- Postgraduate Diplomas in Non-Formal Education

== Commemorative postage stamp ==
Pakistan Post issued a commemorative postage stamp on 20 November 1999, on the university's 25th anniversary.

== See also ==
- Open education
- Higher education in Pakistan
- List of universities in Pakistan
