= Derawali dialect =

Dialect of Saraiki

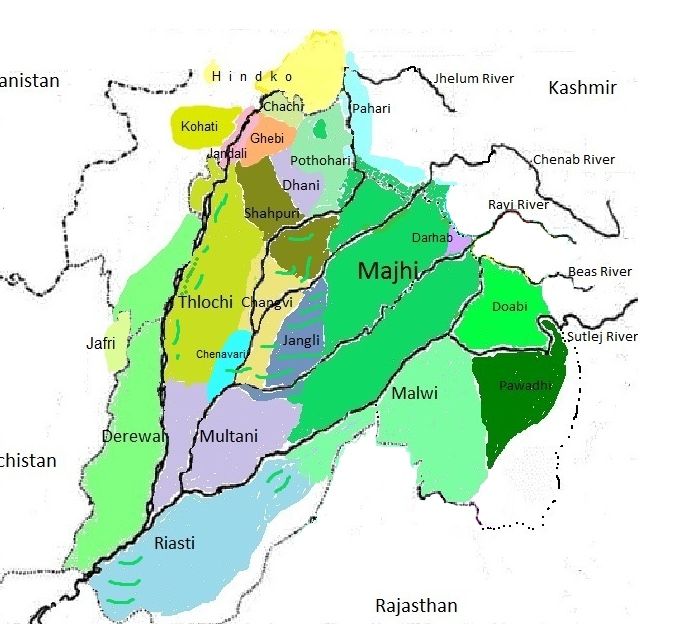
Map of Punjabi dialects and other closely related languages

Ḍerāwālī (ڈیرا والی) is a term used for a group of Lahnda varieties spoken in the Derajat and Mianwali. Derawali is not recognised as a distinct dialect; in Dera Ismail Khan District and Mianwali, Derawali is the local name of the Thali dialect, whereas in Dera Ghazi Khan District, it refers to the Multani variety of Saraiki language. In both cases, the dialect in question is also referred to as the term Hindkī (which is not to be confused with the Hindko spoken up north).
