= Rahim Yar Khan =

City in Punjab, Pakistan

Rahim Yar Khan رحیم یار خاں
- City
- Rahim Yar Khan
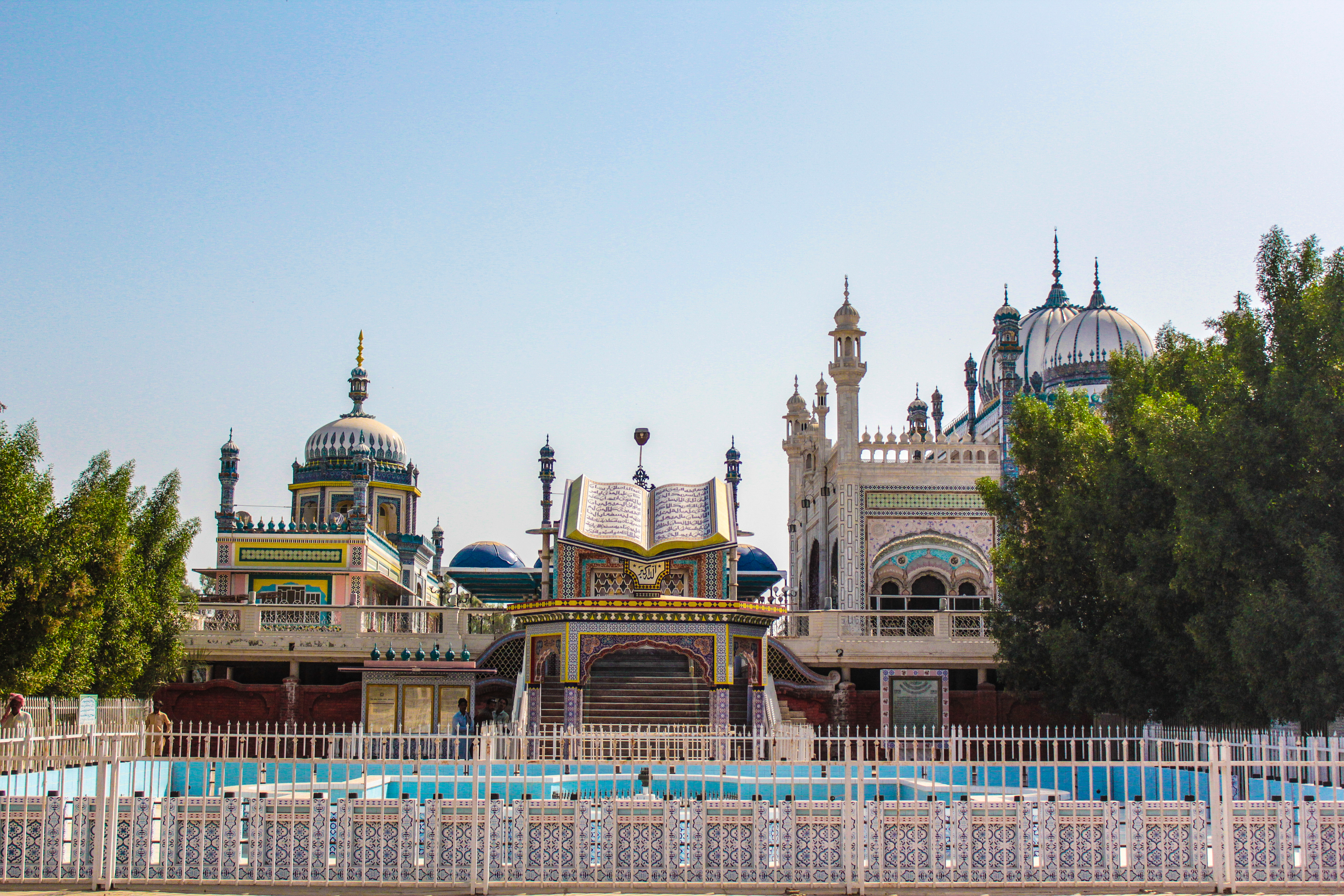
- Bhong Mosque

- Location of Rahim Yar Khan Rahim Yar Khan (Pakistan)
- Coordinates: 28°25′12″N 70°18′0″E
- Country: Pakistan
- Province: (Punjab, Pakistan) Punjab
- District: Rahim Yar Khan

Area
  - Total: 210.2 km^{2} (81.2 sq mi)
- Elevation: 83 m (272 ft)

Population (2023 Census)
  - Total: 519,261
  - Rank: 21st, Pakistan; 14th, Punjab
  - Density: 2,470/km^{2} (6,398/sq mi)
- Time zone: UTC+5 (PST)
- Postal code: 64200
- Calling code: 068
- Number of tehsils: 4
- Number of Union councils: 139
- Website: rykhan.punjab.gov.pk

Rahim Yar Khan (Urdu: رحیم یار خان, romanized: Rahīm Yār Khān; Urdu pronunciation: [ɾəɦiːm jɑːɾ xɑːn]) is a city in the Punjab, Pakistan. It is the 21st most populous city in Pakistan and is the capital of the Rahim Yar Khan District. The city's administration is divided into nine union councils. Originally named Noshehra, it was renamed to Rahim Yar Khan in honour of the son of Sadeq Mohammad Khan IV.

== History ==
People have lived near this area for a very long time. The ancient tower of Pattan Minara stands 8 km to the east of the city center, and is believed to be the remains of a 5,000-year-old monastery, with the minara built during the Hakrra valley civilization of the Mauryan period (250 BC).

Rahim Yar Khan was founded in 1751 as Noshehra. Its region was part of the Multan province of Mughal Empire. Railway administrators wanted to change the name of the town due to its similar name to Nowshera. In 1881, Sadeq Mohammad Khan IV renamed the area to Rahim Yar Khan in honour of his son.

Rahim Yar Khan was a part of the Bahawalpur State until 1943, when it became a separate district.

== Climate ==
Rahim Yar Khan has hot dry climate characterized by hot summers and mild winters. Rahim Yar Khan city is located on the eastern bank of the River Indus which played a vital role in shaping the region's landscape. One-fourth of the city is within the Cholistan Desert.

== Economy ==
Rahim Yar Khan is one of the leading agriculture and industrial centre of Southern Punjab. The economy is primarily based on agriculture. 65% of the population is employed in agricultural work. Rahim Yar Khan produces sugarcane, wheat, cotton, rice while also being renowned for its high quality mangoes. The city is home to numerous agro-based Industries.

== Demographics ==
Population

Historical population

Year	Pop.	±% p.a.
1951	14,919	—
1961	43,548	+11.31%
1972	74,262	+4.97%
1981	119,036	+5.38%

Year	Pop.	±% p.a.
1998	233,537	+4.04%
2017	477,100	+3.83%
2023	519,261	+1.42%

The population of the city is 519,261 during the 2023 census.

=== Language ===
Languages of Rahim Yar Khan MC (2023)
1. Punjabi (52.9%)
2. Saraiki (32.9%)
3. Urdu (9.50%)
4. Pashto (2.00%)
5. Others (2.70%)

In the 2023 census, 52.9% of the population spoke Punjabi, 32.9% spoke Saraiki, 9.0% spoke Urdu, 2.0% spoke Pashto and an additional 2.70% of the population spoke other languages including 1.13% who did not consider their mother tongue to be among the options given.

=== Religion ===
Majority of the population are Muslims (97.44%). Minority faiths include Hinduism (1.33%), Christians (1.18%) and others.

== Education ==
- Khawaja Fareed University of Engineering and Information Technology
- The Islamia University of Bahawalpur, Rahim Yar Khan Campus
- Khawaja Fareed Government College

== Transport ==
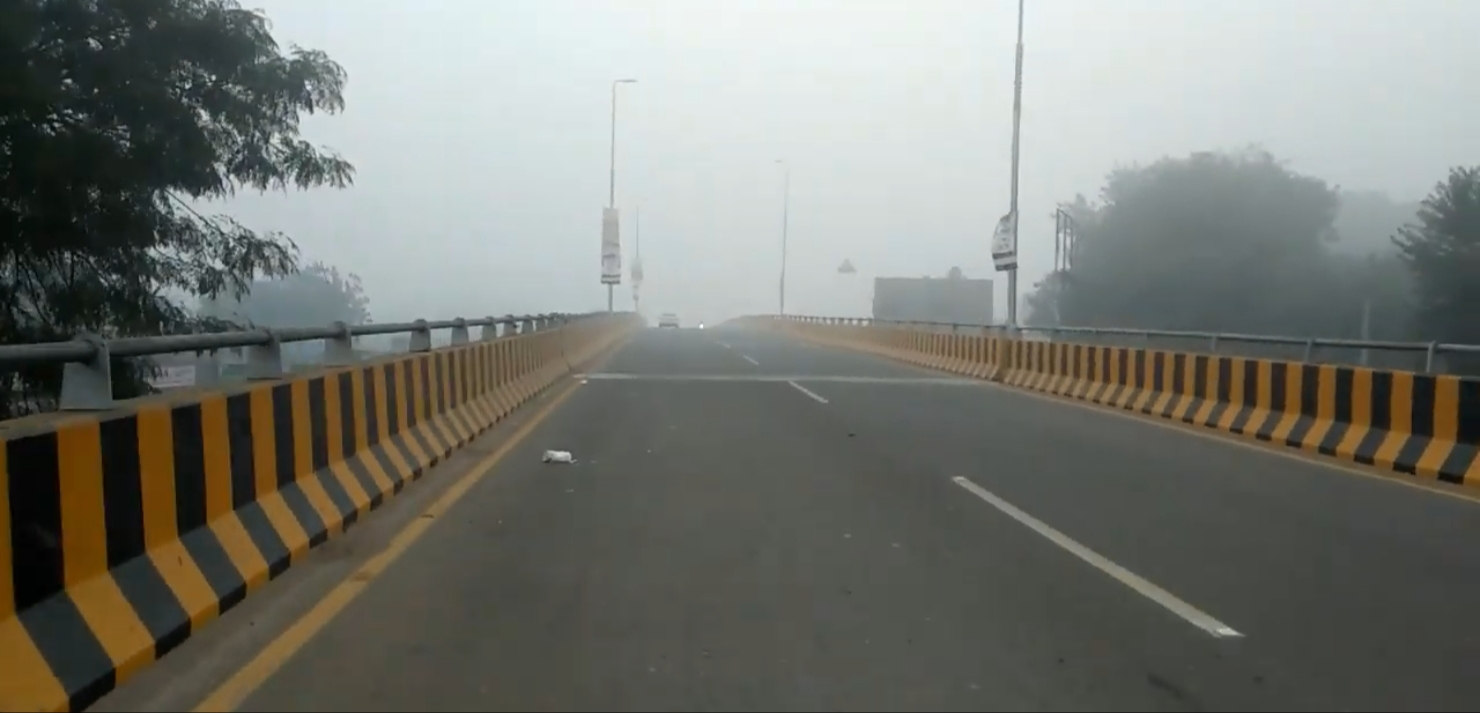
Flyover in Rahim Yar Khan City

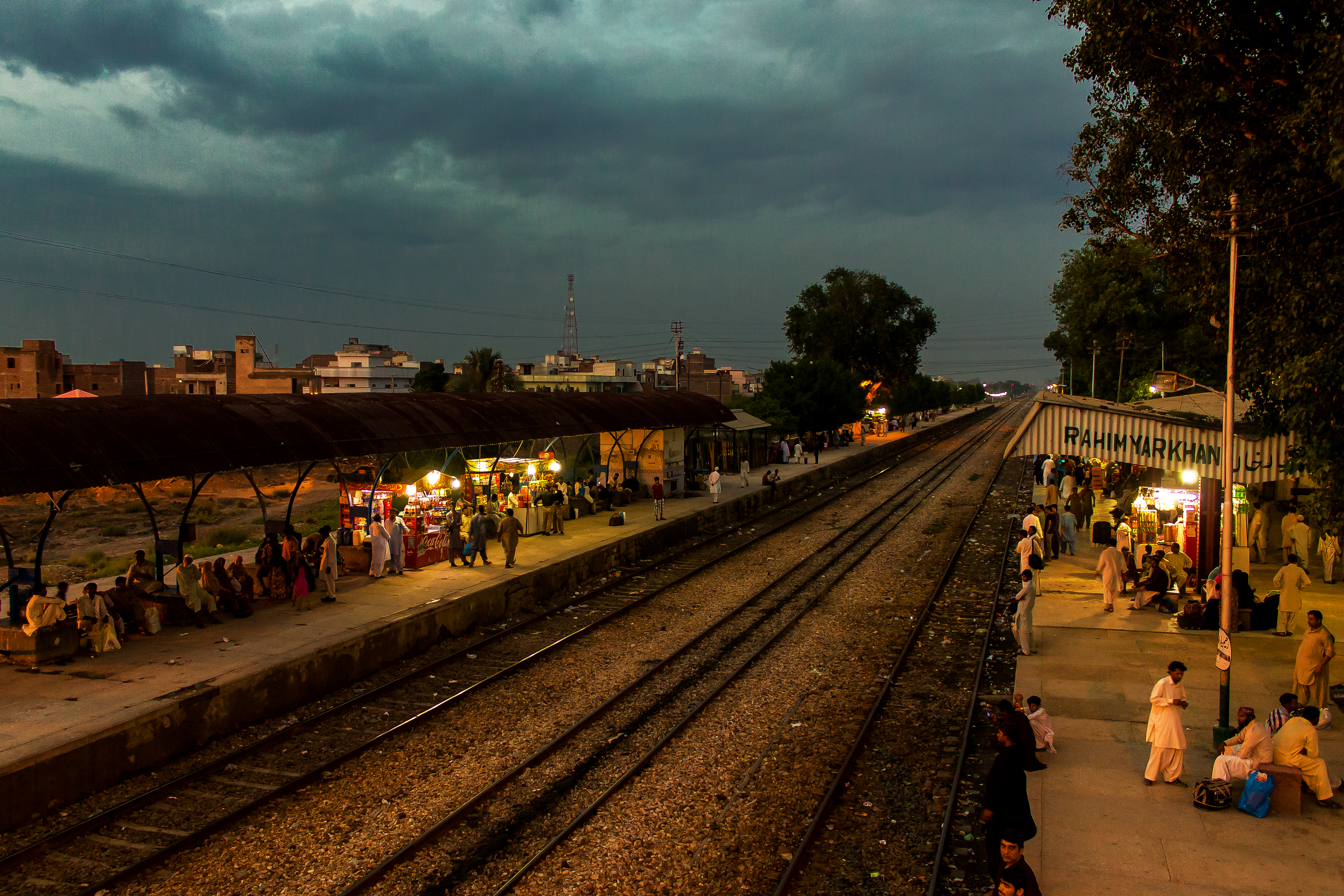
Rahim Yar Khan railway station

=== Motorway ===
Rahim Yar Khan is connected with M-5 Motorway which is also known as Multan-Sukkur motorway.

=== Railways ===
Rahim Yar Khan Railway Station is one of the main railway station on ML-1.

=== Airport ===
Shaikh Zayed International Airport is located in Rahim Yar Khan. It serves the people of city with domestic and international flights. There are daily flight from this airport to Karachi, twice in a week to/from Lahore, and once a week to Islamabad. The Airport runway is capable of accommodating Boeing 747 aircraft.

== Notable people ==
- Aima Baig, singer
- Asim Saleem Bajwa, Lieutenant general (Pakistan)
- Talha Chahour, actor
- Saima Akram Chaudhry, Pakistani screenwriter
- Abdullah Darkhawasti, Pakistani Sunni Islamic scholar
- Fida-Ur-Rehman Darkhawasti, Islamic scholar, academic person and politician
- Muniba Mazari, social activist

== See also ==
- Patan minara
- Islamgarh Fort

== Works cited ==
=== Books ===
- Sachedina, Amal (2021). Cultivating the Past, Living the Modern: The Politics of Time in the Sultanate of Oman. Cornell University Press. ISBN 9781501758621. JSTOR 10.7591/j.ctv1bxh5sk.

=== Journals ===
- Valeri, Marc (2010). "High Visibility, Low Profile: The Shi'a in Oman Under Sultan Qaboos". International Journal of Middle East Studies. 42 (2). Cambridge University Press: 251–268. JSTOR 40784725.

=== News ===
- "Our History". Rahim Yar Khan District. Archived from the original on 27 March 2020.
- "RYK – The City of Ancient Heritage". Khawaja Fareed University of Engineering and Information Technology. Archived from the original on 7 July 2025.
