= Bachelor of Eastern Medicine and Surgery =

Undergraduate medical degree in countries

Bachelor of Eastern Medicine and Surgery (BEMS) or Bachelor of Unani Medicine and Surgery (BUMS) is a bachelor's degree in Unani medicine and surgery awarded upon graduation from medical school by universities in Pakistan, India, Bangladesh, Sri Lanka and in South Africa as BCM Complementary Medicine: Unani Tibb.

== In Pakistan ==
It is a form of Oriental medicine launched for the first time at the Hamdard University and then in Islamia University in Pakistan.

Admission to 5-yearly BEMS degree/classified program/course is purely based on FSC (Pre-Medical). Internship Bachelor of Eastern Medicine and Surgery: After completing the degree program and one-yearly house internship, NCT licensed graduates can practice Eastern medicine as registered Unani physician according to the UAH Act 2002-1965. Qualified graduates can be enrolled in Higher Education Commission registered private and public universities. They can also be enrolled for Eastern Medicine curriculum to receive M.Phil. And Ph.D. degrees inside and abroad.
