= Shaikh Zayed International Airport =

Airport in Punjab province, Pakistan

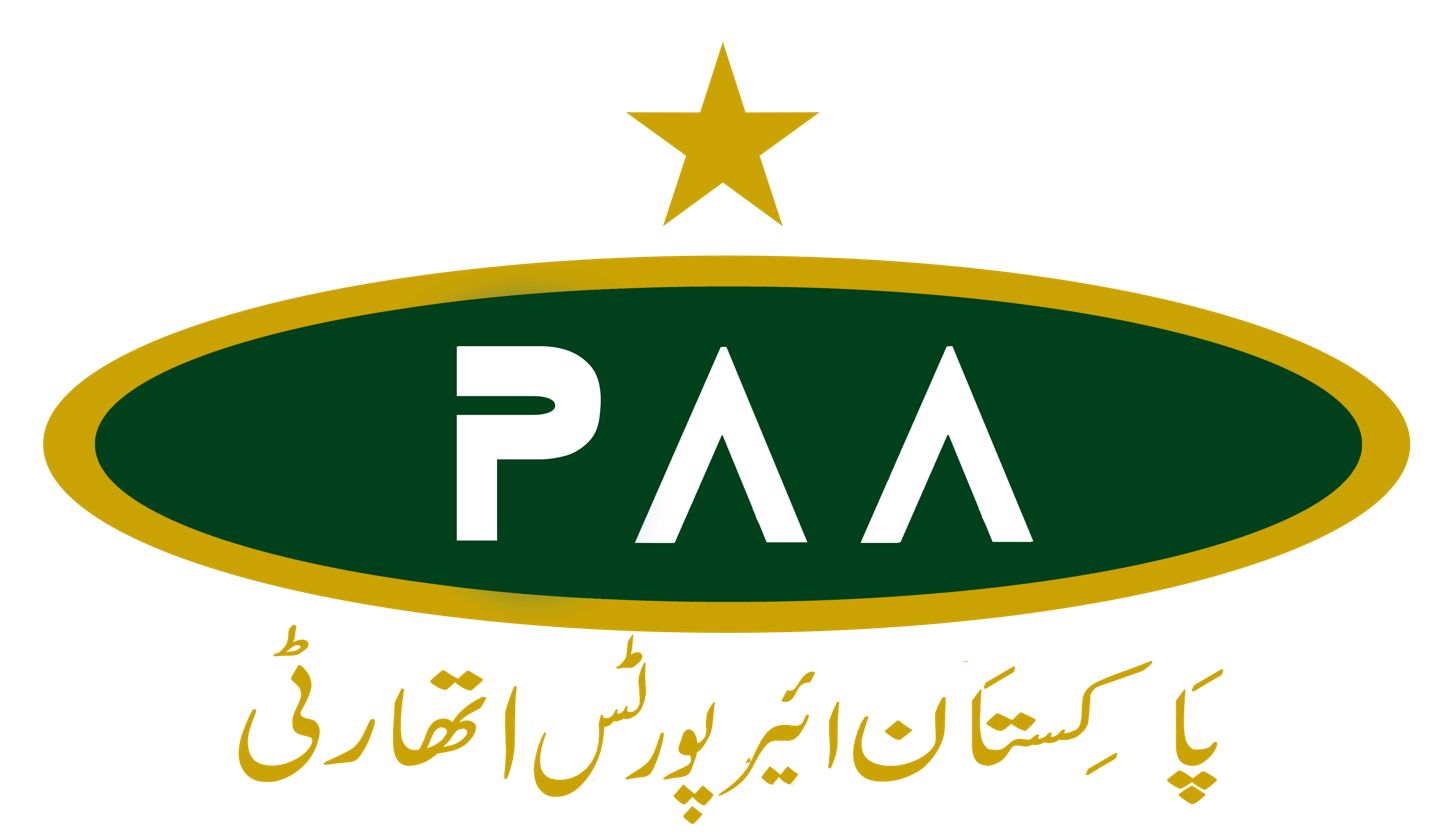
Sheikh Zayed International Airport شیخ زاید بین الاقوامی ہوائی اڈا

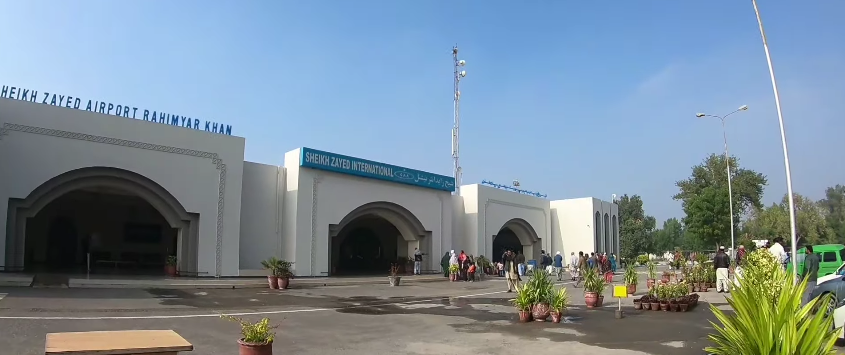
- Sheikh Zayed International Airport RYK
- IATA: RYK; ICAO: OPRK

Summary
- Airport type: Public
- Owner: GoP Aviation Division
- Operator: Pakistan Airports Authority
- Serves: Rahim Yar Khan-64200
- Location: Rahim Yar Khan District, Punjab, Pakistan
- Opened: 1993; 33 years ago
- Elevation AMSL: 271 ft (83 m)
- Coordinates: 28°23′07″N 70°16′47″E
- Website: paa.gov.pk
- Interactive map of Sheikh Zayed International Airport

Runways
Direction	Length		Surface
Direction	ft	m	Surface
01/19	9,842	3,000	Bitumen

Statistics (2023-24)
- Passengers: 2004
- Aircraft movements: 156
- Sources: PAA AIP

Rahim Yar Khan International Airport (IATA: RYK, ICAO: OPRK), also known as Sheikh Zayed Airport, is located at Rahim Yar Khan, in the Punjab province of Pakistan. The airport is about 5 km (3.1 mi) from the city centre. The origin of Rahim Yar Khan Airport date back to mid-1960s when the Government of Pakistan established a civil airfield to improve connectivity for the Southern Region of Punjab. During the 1973 Floods the airport played a significant role by serving as a base for relief operations. Aircraft carrying food,medicine and emergency supplies operated through the airport. Its name change to Sheikh Zayed International Airport in honour of Zayed bin Sultan Al Nahyan who funded the upgrade of the airport in 1993.

== History ==
=== Early aerodrome ===
The history of civil aviation in Rahim Yar Khan precedes the construction of the Sheikh Zayed International Airport by several decades. A civil aerodrome was constructed at Rahim Yar Khan in 1951 by the Government of the erstwhile Bahawalpur State with the funds provided by the Municipal Committee of Rahim Yar Khan. The original runway was of brick ballast and was 3,000 feet (914 m) long and 100 feet (30 m) wide with 200-foot (61 m) side strips on either side. The aerodrome was handed over to the Federal Government’s Civil Aviation Department in 1957. Furthermore, the aerodrome was developed. For example, in 1965, the Civil Aviation Department extended the runway by another 1,500 feet (457 m).

At that time, the aerodrome did not have a control tower and the terminal building was incomplete. The runway was suitable only for relatively small planes and was not suitable for large aircraft with nose-wheel landing gear. Pakistan International Airlines (PIA) inaugurated a scheduled Dakota service at Rahim Yar Khan on 1 February 1966, operating between Karachi and Rahim Yar Khan via Sukkur. The service was discontinued on 1 July 1966. The district's historical record attributed the limited viability of the service partly to the absence of a connection with Lahore and noted that improvements to the runway were being considered to enable larger aircraft and a Lahore connection.

==== Sheikh Zayed redevelopment ====
The further development of the airport was closely linked with the future president of the United Arab Emirates and Emir of Abu Dhabi, Sheikh Zayed bin Sultan Al Nahyan. The Emir was an avid hunter who had been vacationing in Rahim Yar Khan and the surrounding Cholistan region for many years. He owned a large estate in the city, which he used as a base for his excursions into the desert. The Emir heavily invested in the development of the infrastructure of both the local airport and the city.

The modern airport complex was considerably reinvested in during the late 1980s. Engineering Consultants International (ECIL) lists the Rahim Yar Khan Airport project as being commenced in 1988 and completed in 1990. It included a passenger terminal building, VVIP lounge, a 2,743-by-30-metre runway for Boeing 737 operation, a 306-by-23-metre central taxiway, a 160-by-90-metre parking apron, and runway and approach lighting systems including runway-edge lighting and precision approach path indicators. The project was partly financed by Sheikh Zayed bin Sultan Al Nahyan. Indeed, the modern facility was a reconstruction and expansion upon an existing civil aerodrome, and not the creation of new aviation installations at Rahim Yar Khan.

On 13 May 1993 Pakistan International Airlines held ceremonies at Rahim Yar Khan Airport to inaugurate service of Boeing 737-300 aircraft from Karachi with PIA Managing Director Air Vice Marshal Farooq Umar.

===== International and regional operations =====
The upgraded airport later became a major regional aviation hub for southern Punjab and surrounding areas. It facilitated scheduled domestic services, international services, VVIP movements and seasonal Hajj operations. PIA launched Rahim Yar Khan–Abu Dhabi international service in 2009. The route was operated as a sector of PIA's Faisalabad–Rahim Yar Khan–Abu Dhabi service and was operated using Boeing 737-300 aircraft. By 2009–10, two weekly international flights to Abu Dhabi were reported, catering to passengers from Rahim Yar Khan, Cholistan and neighbouring areas, including overseas Pakistanis working in the United Arab Emirates.

The airport was also used to perform Hajj operations. Rahim Yar Khan was considered as a Hajj departure airport in government Hajj policies, and served pilgrims from Rahim Yar Khan and surrounding areas.

The airport was fitted for night operations and could accommodate planes much bigger than those that had been permitted on the original 1950s aerodrome. In November 2014, PIA announced a schedule which would use Airbus A320 aircraft for daily Karachi services, except on Thursday, and three weekly services between Lahore and Rahim Yar Khan.

====== Decline in scheduled services ======
In spite of the relatively substantial infrastructure, scheduled passenger operations declined considerably during the 2010s and early 2020s. PIA operated domestic services connecting Rahim Yar Khan with Karachi, Lahore and Islamabad, as well as international Abu Dhabi services, which were operated periodically. International operations were affected by aircraft shortages and were suspended at various times.

The COVID-19 pandemic caused a cancellation of scheduled flights in the country in March 2020. Domestic airlines resumed operations soon in the country. However, the flights at Rahim Yar Khan airport remained partial. As of 2022, the airport was said to only host a few flights to Karachi. A service to Lahore that was resumed in August 2021 operated for a single day.

By 2023, the airport ceased to be a regular commercial airport for scheduled passenger operations, though it has maintained its international airport infrastructure and VVIP facilities.

====== Resumption of commercial service ======
Following restoration works the regular commercial passenger services were resumed in Rahim Yar Khan in July 2026. South Air started the services on 18 July 2026 with one inaugural flight from Karachi via Rahim Yar Khan to Islamabad and onward return legs. The first services of South Air operated were twice weekly services connecting Rahim Yar Khan with Karachi and Islamabad. The resumption of regular commercial operations was marked as the reopening of the airport after years of absence of any commercial flights.

As the present state is in 2026, the airport continues to be an international designated civil airport for Rahim Yar Khan and the region, while maintaining its status as the VVIP and dual-use aviation center.

== UAE royal and VVIP use ==
The airport has had a particular relationship with the ruling family of Abu Dhabi in the past. The close ties between Sheikh Zayed bin Sultan Al Nahyan and Rahim Yar Khan, Cholistan, were partially responsible for the airport’s upgrade. A VVIP lounge was built as a part of an extensive development plan for the airport completed in 1990. The airport has since been served by VVIP and VIP services due to Pakistan-UAE diplomatic relations. The nearby Chandna Airport in the Cholistan Desert should not be confused with the Sheikh Zayed International Airport. It is a distinct airfield that serves as a venue for trips to the desert. For instance, UAE President Sheikh Mohamed bin Zayed Al Nahyan visited Pakistan as a private tourist in January 2023 and used the Chandna Airport in Rahim Yar Khan.

== 2025 military strikes and damage ==
During the May 2025 India-Pakistan conflict the Rahim Yar Khan aviation complex was damaged during strikes on military and aviation facilities in Pakistan. The airport's landing strip was temporarily closed down. In following days, satellites made a picture of a crater on the landing strip, while reports stated damage to the airport's Royal/VVIP lounge and an impact crater on the apron.

== Facilities and Infrastructure ==
Rahim Yar Khan Airport serves a strategic aviation hub in Southern Punjab. It features a single consolidated passenger terminal handling both domestic and International flights. The airport runway is capable of accommodating Boeing 747 aircraft. The airport has dedicated lounge for state guests and dignitaries. Pakistan Civil Aviation Authority officially upgraded the airport status from domestic to International with first international flight departing in 2009. There are currently no international flights from this airport.

== Airlines and destinations ==
First international flight departed from Rahim Yar Khan to Abu Dhabi in 2009. Pakistan International Airlines operates regular domestic flights until 2023. South Air a new regional airline starts operations from Rahim Yar Khan to Karachi and Islamabad in 2026.

Airlines	Destinations
South Air	Karachi, Islamabad

== See also ==
- Airlines of Pakistan
- List of airports in Pakistan
- Pakistan Civil Aviation Authority
- Transport in Pakistan
