= Federal Urdu University =

Public university in Islamabad and Karachi

Federal Urdu University of Arts, Sciences & Technology, Islamabad
- جامعہ هنر، علوم و فناوری اردو، اسلام آباد
- Other name: FUUAST
- Former names: Federal Urdu Science College, Federal Urdu Arts College
- Type: Public
- Established: 2002 as university
- Academic affiliations: Pakistan Engineering Council; Higher Education Commission (Pakistan); Pakistan Bar Council; Pharmacy Council of Pakistan; National Council for Homeopathy
- Chancellor: President of Pakistan
- Vice-Chancellor: Zabta Khan Shinwari
- Academic staff: 450
- Students: Approximately 13,500
- Location: Islamabad, Islamabad Capital Territory, Pakistan; 24.9120°N 67.0907°E
- Campus: Primary Campus at Islamabad, sub-campus at Karachi, Pakistan
- Colours: Green, white
- Website: Islamabad campus Karachi campus

The Federal Urdu University of Arts, Science and Technology (Urdu: جامعہ هنر، علوم و فناوری اردو، اسلام آباد), alternatively known as FUUAST, is a public university primarily located at Islamabad, Pakistan, with a sub-campus at Karachi.

Of the university's two campuses, the central campus is located in Islamabad while the secondary campus is located in Karachi. The administrative and degree awarding units of the university are currently based in Karachi, which also acts as the university's present headquarters. The university offers a wide range of academic programs in undergraduate and post-graduate. The university is noted for its engaging research in fine arts, languages, engineering, social sciences and philosophy. The university has an approximate enrollment of 13,500 students.

== Accreditation and ranking ==
It is one of the largest institutions in the country and is one of the top 10 universities in the "general category" ranked by the Higher Education Commission.

The Federal Urdu University holds a distinction of being as one of the few institutions of higher learning in languages and maintains a reputation for conducting scientific research towards the advancement of languages, engineering, philosophy, natural, medical and social sciences. In addition, the university is also known for its financial affordability while engaged in offering an international standard scientific research and development in various academic multi-disciplines.

== Mass Communication Department Islamabad Campus ==
Dr. Sikander Zareen Ali currently leads the Department of Mass Communication at the Federal Urdu University of Arts, Science and Technology (FUUAST), Islamabad Campus. He is also Director of PEHEL News and DEIP Newspaper. His work bridges the gap between media theory and practical journalism, providing students with industry-oriented learning and exposure.

Dr. Sikander Zareen is regarded as one of the most influential and contributing faculty members of the Mass Communication Department at FUUAST. His contributions include teaching, research, mentorship, and institutional development, which have strengthened the department’s academic standing and professional relevance. Through his academic and media initiatives, he continues to support the growth of responsible journalism and communication studies in Pakistan.

The second annual edition of Pehel magazine was launched at the Department of Mass Communication, Federal Urdu University of Arts, Science and Technology (FUUAST), Islamabad Campus. This edition was published under the theme of Green Journalism, focusing on environmental awareness, climate change, and sustainability issues.

== History ==
Urdu College was first established by Baba-e-Urdu Maulvi Abdul Haq at Karachi in 1949. Then this college was given the status of a University on 13 November 2002 by presidential order and is the first university in Pakistan to teach primarily in the Urdu language. It was established by merging the Federal Urdu Arts College and the Federal Urdu Science College, both in Karachi. Pirzada Qasim Raza Siddiqui was appointed as the first Vice Chancellor of Federal Urdu University in 2002. President Pervez Musharraf was the university's first chancellor.

== Disputed Allegations and Response by the Former Acting Vice Chancellor ==
Prof. Dr. Muhammad Ziauddin is a retired senior academician who served as the Dean of the Faculty of Arts and later as the Dean of the Faculty of Education and Islamic Studies at the university. He subsequently served as the acting Vice Chancellor of the university. He was appointed as the acting Vice Chancellor in September 2022 by President Arif Alvi to manage the university during a leadership vacancy. His appointment was extended in June 2023. In October 2023, the Ministry of Federal Education and Professional Training removed Dr. Ziauddin from the position of acting Vice Chancellor.

During a dispute between the administration of the university and the Higher Education Commission over alleged irregularities in appointments and financial matters, the university administration of that time formally contested the commission's findings. Muhammad Ziauddin authored a response report submitted to the Chancellor (the president of Pakistan), arguing that the HEC had misrepresented or selectively excluded complete enrollment and staff data. He further stated that individuals who had been offered posts but had not joined were wrongly included in calculations, that findings were based mainly on the Karachi campus while not fully considering the Islamabad campus, and that the selection committee's quorum complied with university rules, with two subject specialists not being mandatory. The report also maintained that objections raised more than a year after the recruitment process lacked procedural validity and noted that the HEC Chairman had participated in the relevant Senate proceedings without prior objection.

== Campuses and departments ==
The Federal Urdu University comprises three campuses and a number of departments:

- Abdul Haq Campus at Baba-e-Urdu Road, Karachi (previously known as Federal Urdu Arts College)
- Gulshan Campus at the University Road, Gulshan-e-Iqbal, Karachi (previously known as Federal Urdu Science College)
- Islamabad Campus, Kuri Model Village, Mozah Mohrian, 5B, Near Bahria Enclave Road, Islamabad (established in 2003 near Zero Point, Islamabad. Later moved on to Kuri Model Village)

Abdul Haq Campus

- Islamic studies
- World Religions
- Business Administration
- Accounts
- Economics
- Education
- English
- General history
- International relations
- Islamic history
- Law
- Mass communication
- Pakistan studies
- Political science
- Psychology
- Social work
- Sindhi
- Urdu

Gulshan campus

- Business Administration
- Commerce
- Economics
- Law
- Biochemistry
- Botany
- Biotechnology
- Chemistry
- Computer science
- Environmental Sciences
- Geography
- Geology
- Mathematical science
- Microbiology
- Pharmaceutics
- Pharmaceutical chemistry
- Pharmacognosy
- Pharmacology
- Physics
- Statistics
- Zoology

Islamabad campus

- Applied physics
- Business administration
- Computer science
- Electrical engineering
- Urdu
- Economics
- Mathematical sciences
- Mass Communications
- English
- International relations

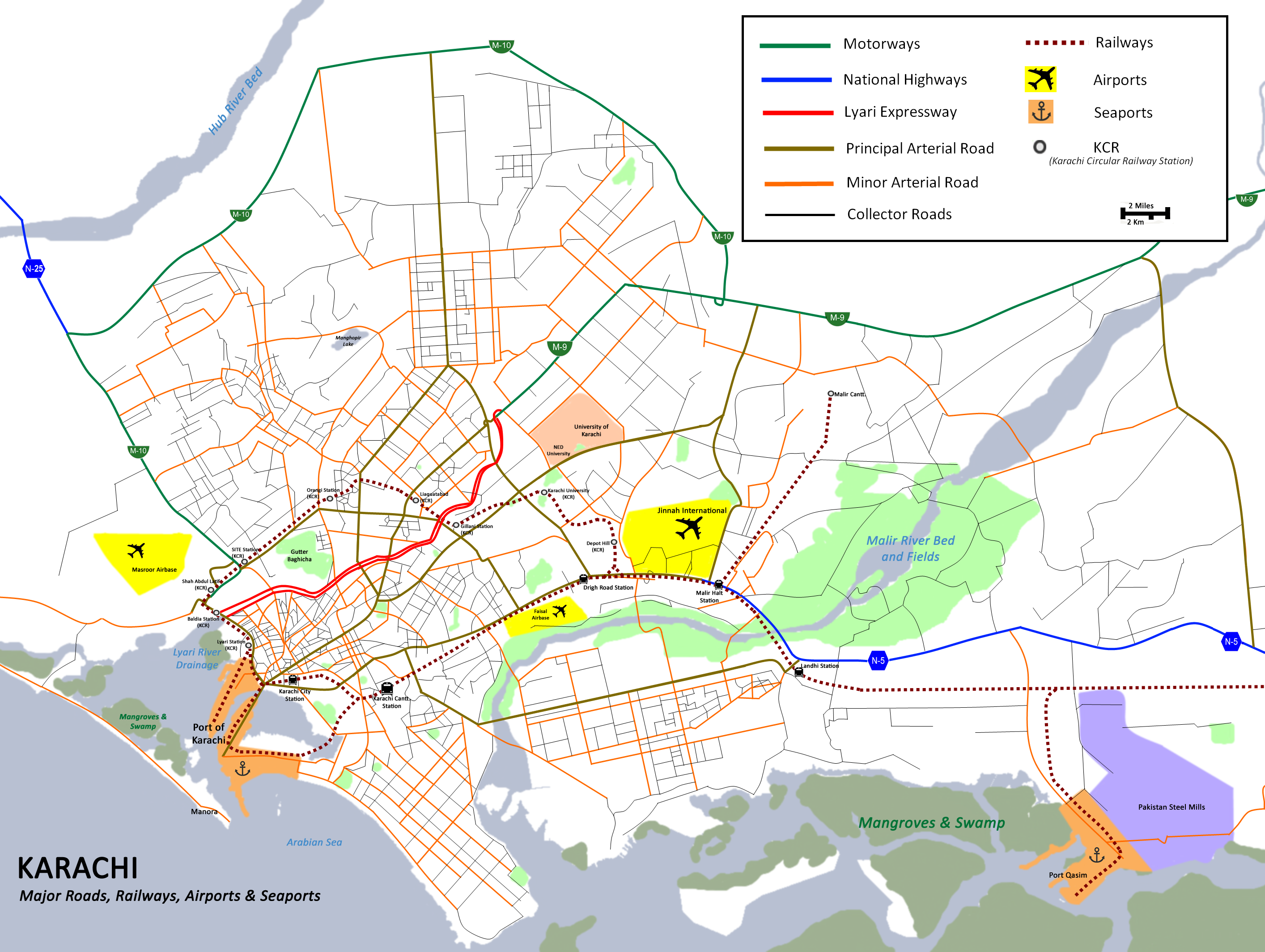
Location of Abdul Haq Campus and Gulshan Campus within Karachi.

== Gallery ==
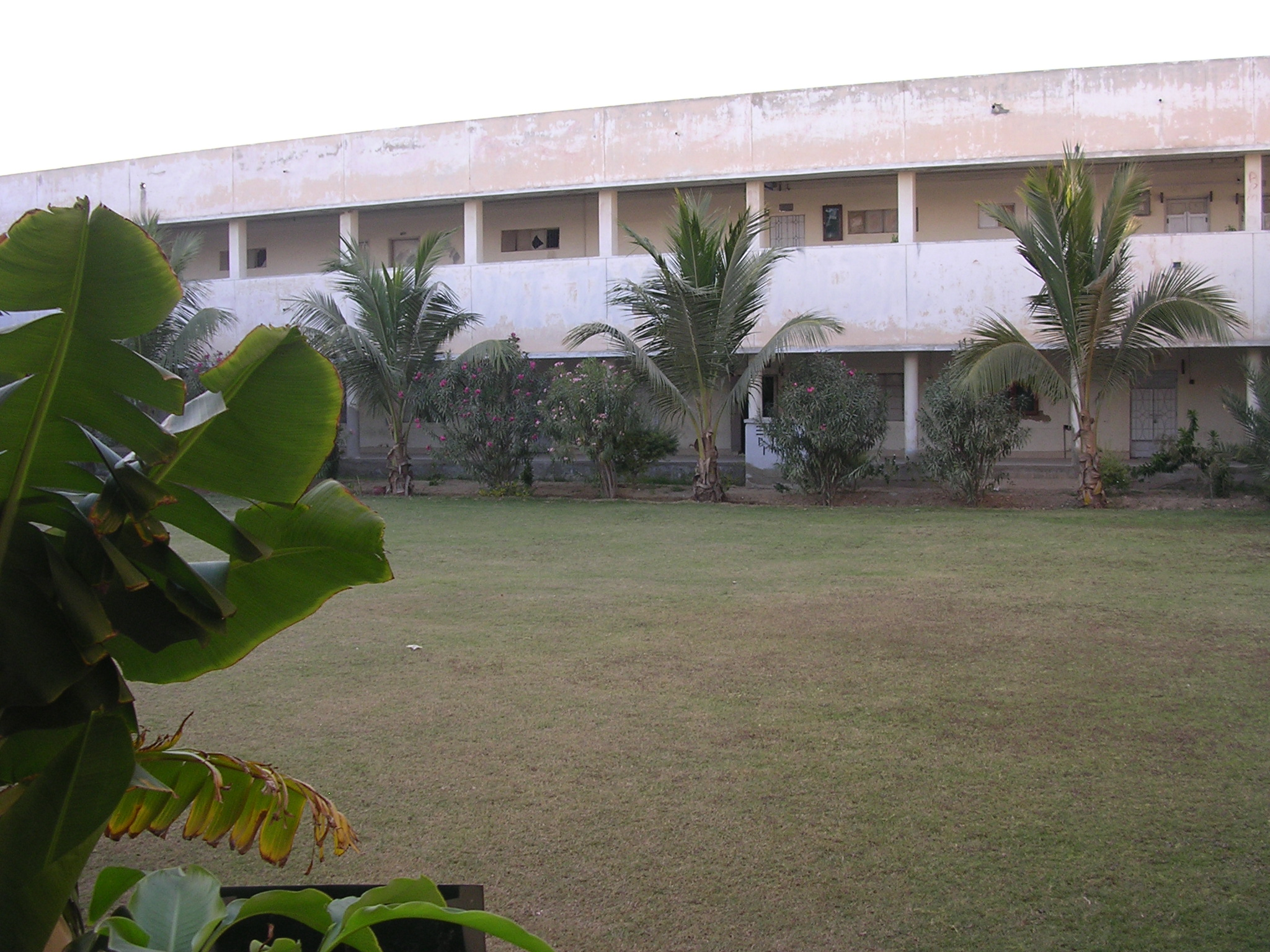

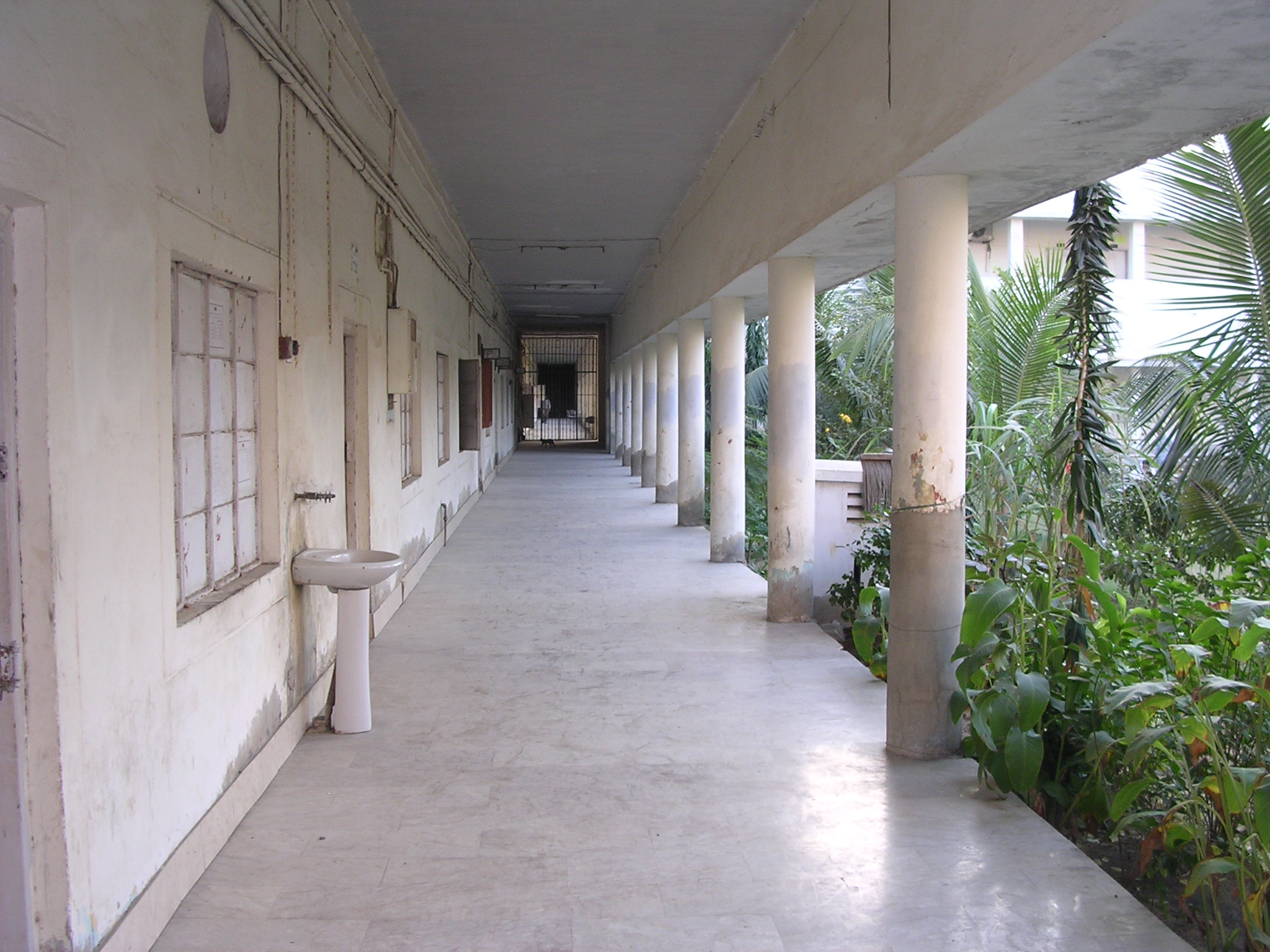

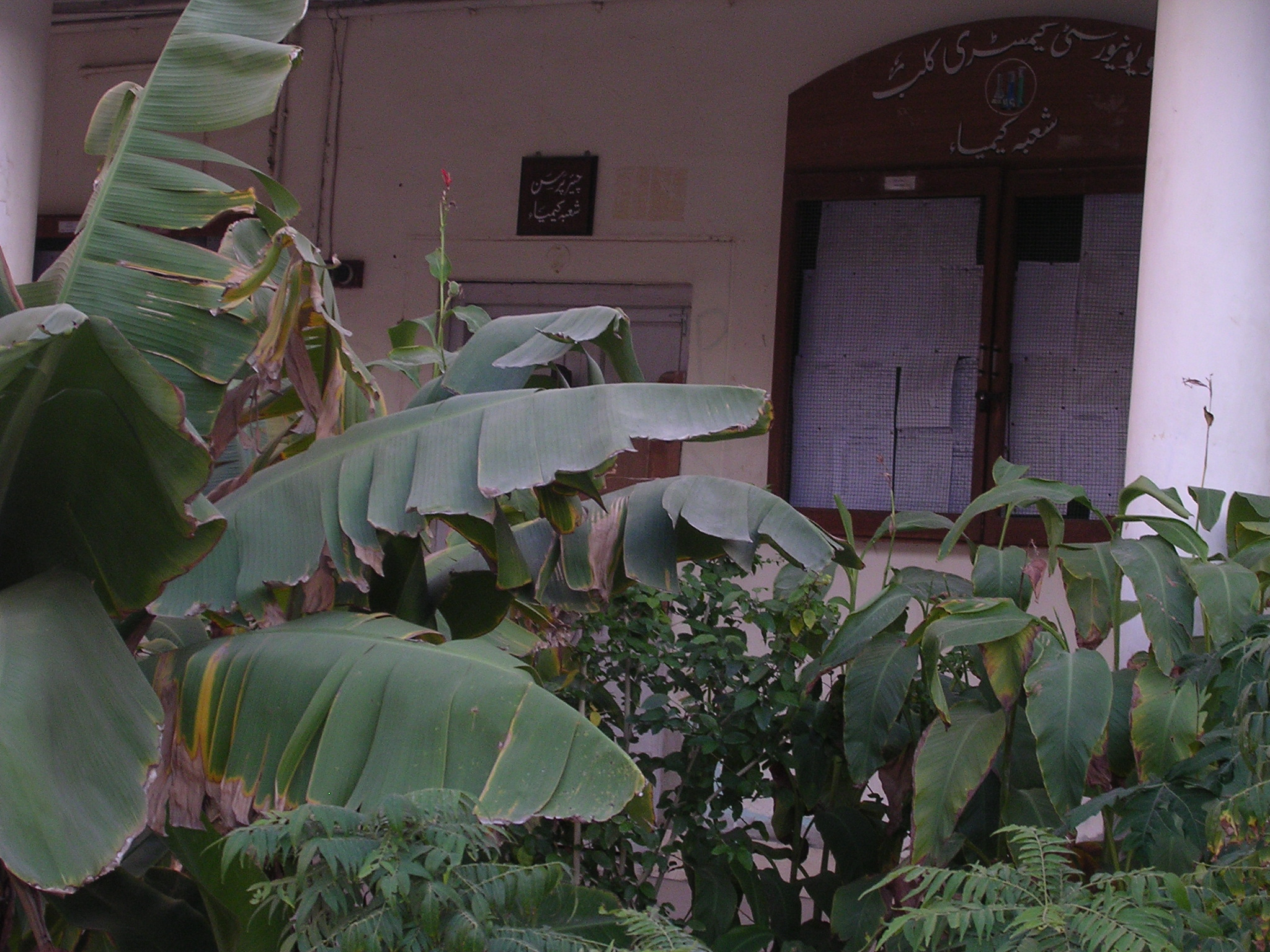

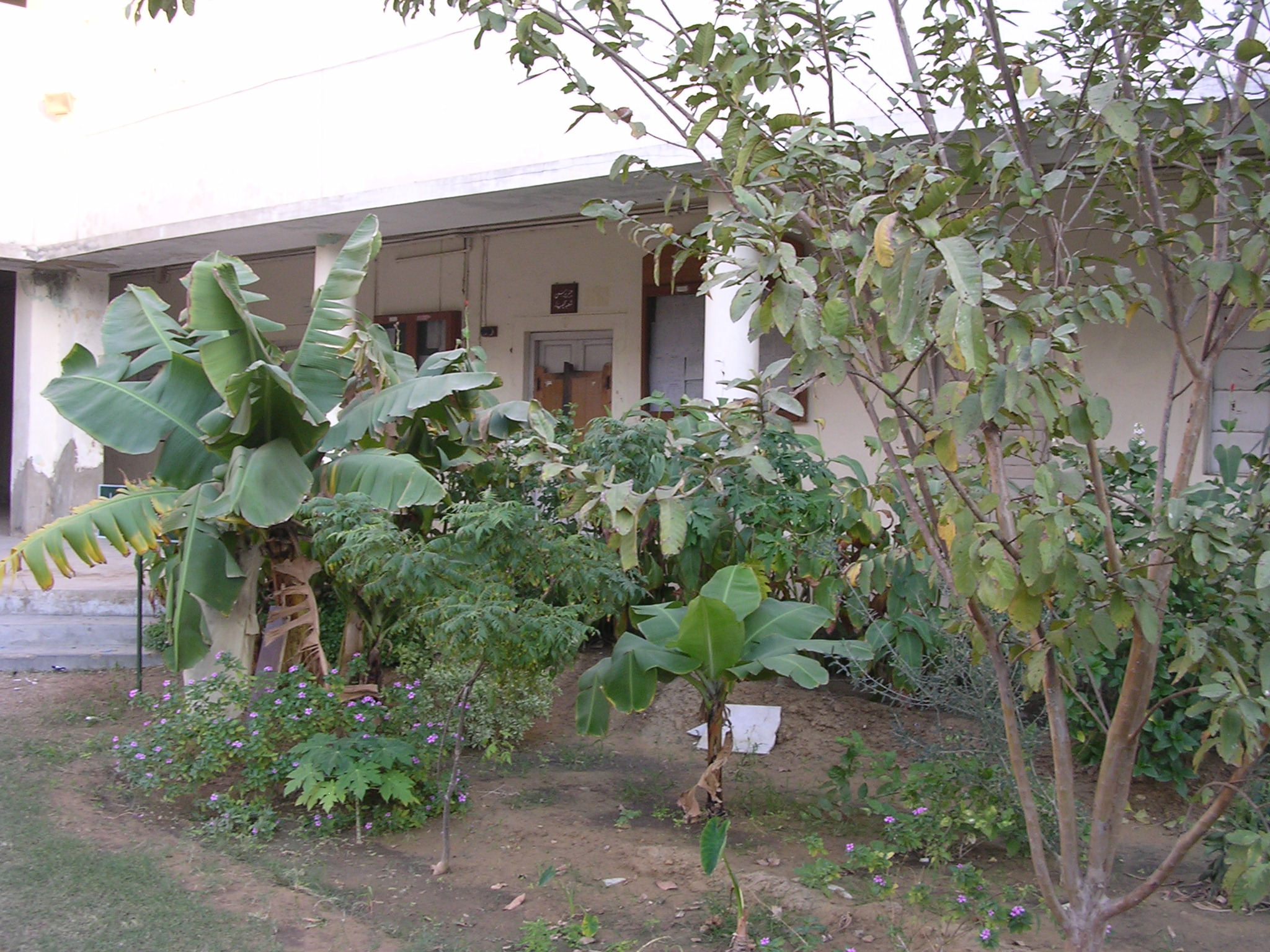

== See also ==
- List of universities in Pakistan
- List of Urdu universities
