= Khawaja Fareed Government College =

College in Punjab, Pakistan

- Type: Public
- Established: 1954; 72 years ago
- Affiliations: Islamia University of Bahawalpur
- Principal: Khalid Mehmood
- Academic staff: Over 100
- Students: 7000
- Location: Rahim Yar Khan, Pakistan
- Campus: Urban and rural, 40 acres (16 ha)
- Colours: Red, white and blue
- Website: kfgc.edu.pk

Khawaja Fareed Government Post Graduate College, Rahim Yar Khan (Urdu: گورنمنٹ خواجہ فرید کالج), located in the city Rahim Yar Khan in Punjab, Pakistan.

== History ==
The state of Bahawalpur laid down the foundation of the college in the city's “Town Hall” in 1948. In its infancy, it consisted of only three rooms. The college was shifted to the present building in 1954. It became a degree college in 1962. A resolution was passed in the National Assembly in 1970 regarding its name. It was named after the famous Sufi Poet Khawaja Ghulam Fareed.

The classes for post graduate studies in English, Urdu, Economics and Political Science were introduced in 1995. In 2012 the college started 09 programs which include M.Sc. Physics, Chemistry, Botany, Zoology, Mathematics, M.A International Relations, Islamiat, M.Ed. and B.Ed. In 2017 & 2018 the college started 08 BS-04 Year Programs in the Subjects of Chemistry, Botany, Zoology, Physics, Mathematics, Economics, Urdu and English.

== Programs offered ==
Intermediate Classes (Only for Boys)

- F. Sc. (Pre-Medical)
- F. Sc. (Pre- Engineering)
- F. A. (All Combinations of Arts Subjects)
- I.C.S (All Combinations)

02 Year Degree Programs (After Intermediate) ( Only for Boys)

- B.Sc. (Pre-Engineering)
- B.Sc. (Zoology, Botany, Chemistry)
- B.A. (All Combinations of Arts Subjects)
- B.Sc. Computer Sciences

Postgraduate 02 Year Programs (After Graduation) Co-Education

- M.A English (2 years)
- M.A Economics (2 years)
- M.A Political Science (2 years)
- M.A Urdu (2 years)
- M.A International Relations (IR) (2 Years)
- M.Sc. Botany (2 years)
- M.Sc. Zoology (2 years)
- M.Sc. Physics (2 years)
- M.Sc. Chemistry (2 years)
- M.Sc. Mathematics (2 years)
- B.Ed. (1.5 year 03 Semesters, After Post-graduation)
- M.Ed. (1 year)

BS 04 Year Programs After Intermediate (Co-Education)

- BS Chemistry (4 years)
- BS Zoology (4 years)
- BS Mathematics (4 years)
- BS Botany (4 years)
- BS Physics (4 years)
- BS Computer Science (4 years)
- BS Economics (4 years)
- BS English (4 years)
- BS Urdu (4 years)
- And Other Basics

== Facilities ==
- Hostels
- Cafeteria
- Bookshop
- Playing grounds for soccer, hockey, and cricket
- IT Lab
- Transport
- Library
- Masjid
- Sub-campus Islamia University, Bahawalpur

== See also ==
- Shaikh Zayed Medical College, Rahim Yar Khan
