= Sobat (dish) =

Saraiki traditional dish

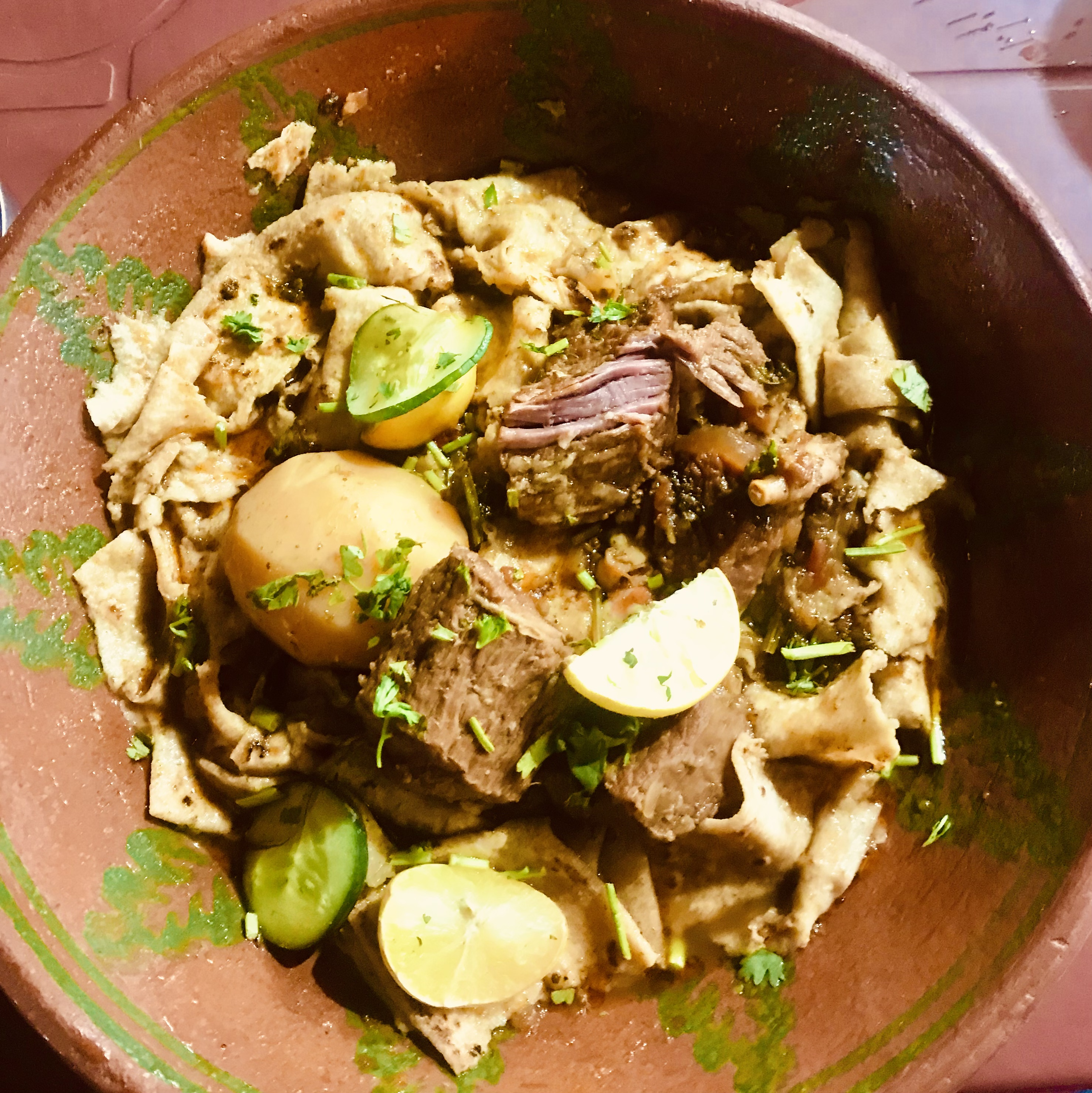
- A plate of Beef Sohbat
- Type: Stew
- Course: Main course
- Place of origin: Pakistan
- Region or state: South Punjab (Tonsa)
- Serving temperature: Hot
- Main ingredients: Meat, Atta, vegetables
- Ingredients generally used: Onions, Tomatoes, Garlic and Ginger
- Variations: Mutton, Beef, Chicken

Sobat (Saraiki: ثوبت) is a traditional Saraiki dish originating in south Punjab, Pakistan, particularly known in the city of Tonsa. Usually served in one pot, the dish comprises meat pieces, typically chicken or mutton, slow-cooked in a flavorful broth infused with ingredients like onions, tomatoes, garlic, ginger, and an assortment of spices. Afterwards, the meat is extracted from the broth and deep fried until crisp. This meat-broth blend is then presented atop a torn flatbread. The bread, akin to local chapati, is baked on stone slabs.

The ensemble is served in a spacious vessel referred to as a "Thaal," facilitating communal enjoyment. Fresh salads, chutneys, and tea often accompany the dish to enhance the Sobat experience. The dish has now also become a part of Pashtun cuisine, especially in Dera Ismail Khan.
