= Athar Mahboob =

Pakistani academic and electrical engineer

- اطہر محبوب
- Born: 13 January 1971 (age 55); Karachi, Pakistan
- Occupations: Academic, electrical engineer
- Known for: Vice-chancellor of The Islamia University of Bahawalpur; Former vice-chancellor of Khawaja Fareed University of Engineering and Information Technology
- Awards: Tamgha-e-Imtiaz (2012)

Athar Mahboob (born January 13, 1971) is a Pakistani academic and electrical engineer. He previously served as the vice-chancellor of The Islamia University of Bahawalpur and Khawaja Fareed University of Engineering and Information Technology, Rahim Yar Khan.

In recognition of his contributions to science, particularly in engineering and technology, Mahboob was awarded the Tamgha-e-Imtiaz (Medal of Excellence) by the president of Pakistan on August 14, 2012.

== Early life and education ==
Mahboob was born in Karachi, Pakistan. He received his early education at various institutions, including Stoke Newington School in London and several Pakistan Air Force schools. He later attended Cadet College Petaro from 1983 to 1986.

He earned a bachelor's and a master's degree in electrical engineering from Florida State University, US, in 1992 and 1995, respectively. In 2005, he obtained a Ph.D. in electrical engineering from the National University of Sciences and Technology (NUST), Pakistan.

== Career ==
Mahboob began his career in 1995 as a general manager at A to Zee Electronics & Audiophiles in Tallahassee, Florida. In 1996, he returned to Pakistan and joined Sir Syed University of Engineering & Technology, Karachi, as an assistant professor and system manager, later becoming an associate professor.

In 2006, he joined National University of Sciences & Technology as an associate professor. From 2012 to 2015, he was a professor and Dean at DHA Suffa University, Karachi, where he established the Electrical Engineering department and managed accreditation processes.

In 2015, Mahboob was appointed vice-chancellor of Khawaja Fareed University of Engineering and Information Technology, Rahim Yar Khan, where he oversaw significant infrastructure and academic growth. In July 2019, he became the vice-chancellor of The Islamia University of Bahawalpur, leading initiatives in quality education, environmental action, health, and community engagement.

== Research and publications ==
Mahboob has published over 30 research papers in international journals and conferences. His research interests include cybersecurity, cryptography, and information technology. He has also served as a reviewer for several ISI-indexed journals, including the IEEE Sensors Journal and IET Networks.

== Awards and honors ==
In recognition of his contributions to science, particularly in engineering and technology, Mahboob was awarded the Tamgha-e-Imtiaz (Medal of Excellence) by the president of Pakistan on August 14, 2012.

== Scandal ==
In July 2023, during the tenure of vice-chancellor Athar Mahboob, The Islamia University of Bahawalpur became the center of a major controversy when the university's chief security officer, Syed Ejaz Shah, was arrested at a police checkpoint. Authorities reported the recovery of illicit drugs and over 5,000 explicit videos, some allegedly involving university staff and students. The arrest led to widespread media coverage and raised concerns about the security and governance of the institution under Mahboob's leadership. The university administration, however, dismissed the allegations as an attempt to malign the institution's reputation.

In response to the scandal, the Higher Education Commission (HEC) formed a five-member fact-finding committee, while the Punjab government established a separate inquiry team to investigate the sale of drugs on campus. The issue was also discussed in the National Assembly of Pakistan, with calls for further scrutiny into the matter. The scandal remained a significant event during his tenure, impacting the university's image and administrative credibility.

== Corruption ==
In 2024, Mahboob, vice chancellor of The Islamia University of Bahawalpur (IUB), faced allegations of financial mismanagement and administrative irregularities. Investigations revealed that university funds allocated for a Cultural Day event were misappropriated under his administration. Additionally, concerns were raised over his hiring practices, as several appointments were made without proper advertisements or selection procedures. Reports also suggested that Mahboob used public funds to acquire a luxury vehicle, further intensifying scrutiny of his financial decisions.

The allegations prompted an official investigation by the Department of Higher Education South Punjab, leading to the formation of a fact-finding committee to examine Mahboob's role in the financial discrepancies. In response, Punjab's chief minister, Mohsin Naqvi, commissioned a three-member inquiry team to further probe the matter, with findings expected to determine possible legal actions. The scandal also extended to IUB's IT Director, Rizwan Majeed, who was arrested by the Anti-Corruption Establishment (ACE) for alleged financial misconduct. Reports indicated that Majeed had a history of malpractice from his tenure at Khawaja Fareed University, yet he was still entrusted with overseeing financial matters at IUB.

== Removal ==
In 2024, Mahboob, vice chancellor (VC) of The Islamia University of Bahawalpur (IUB), was removed from his position following an inquiry by the Chief Minister's Inspection Team (CMIT). The investigation uncovered financial mismanagement, including the misappropriation of Rs. 5 million for a cultural event in 2020, unauthorized appointments, and violations in faculty recruitment. It was found that Mahboob had illegally appointed multiple treasurers for a single post, approved over 100 unapproved hires, and misused emergency powers in appointing department chairpersons.

As a result of these findings, the CMIT recommended his removal from the position of vice chancellor and proposed barring him from holding any future government office.

== Later career ==
Following his removal as Vice Chancellor of The Islamia University of Bahawalpur, Mahboob subsequently joined Al-Kawthar University in Karachi as its Vice Chancellor. As of now, he has continued to serve in this position.
