= Muhammad Afzal Gill =

Pakistani politician

Member of the Provincial Assembly of the Punjab
- In office 15 August 2018 – 14 January 2023
- Constituency: PP-248 Bahawalpur-II

Chairman Standing Committee on Agriculture
- In office 11 May 2013 – 31 July 2018

Member of the Provincial Assembly of the Punjab
- In office 11 May 2013 – 31 May 2018
- Constituency: PP-274 Bahawalpur-II

Member of the Provincial Assembly of the Punjab
- In office 1997–1999
- Constituency: PP-224 Bahawalpur-II

Personal details
- Born: 1 February 1964 (age 62) Hasilpur, Punjab, Pakistan
- Party: PML(N) (1991-present)

Muhammad Afzal Gill is a Pakistani politician who was a Member of the Provincial Assembly of the Punjab, from 1997 to 1999, again from May 2013 to May 2018 and from August 2018 to January 2023.

== Early life and education ==
He was born on 1 February 1964 in Hasilpur.

He has the degree of Bachelor of Arts and the degree of LL. B. Bachelor of Laws which he obtained in 1995 from the Islamia University Bahawalpur.

== Political career ==
Muhammad Afzal Gill started his political career in 1991 contesting Local Government Election. He was elected member district council defeating Chaudhry Rasheed an X MPA. He ran for the seat of the Provincial Assembly of the Punjab as a candidate of (PML-N) from Constituency PP-224 (Bahawalpur-VII) in the 1993 Pakistani general election. He received 17,984 votes and lost the seat to Riaz Ahmed, a candidate of the Pakistan Peoples Party.

He was elected to the Provincial Assembly of the Punjab as a candidate of PML-N from Constituency PP-224 (Bahawalpur-VII) in the 1997 Pakistani general election. He received 39,334 votes and defeated the candidate of PPP, Riaz Ahmed.

He was not eligible to contest 2002 general elections due to a court ban for 10 years. In 2002 General election he supported National Alliance Candidate Chaudhry Ahmad Nawaz against Sohail Bajwa of PMLQ.

In 2005 Local Government Election Muhammad Afzal Gill contested for the slot of Tehsil Nazim, but he was unsuccessful. He was defeated by Syed Sajjad Hussain Bukhari a candidate of ruling alliance Bahawalpur Ittehad backed by PML. Whereas Muhammad Afzal Gill was supported by Nawab of Bahawalpur Salahuddin Abbasi. In 2008 general elections again he was not eligible to contest election. This time he introduced his younger brother Muhammad Safdar Gill in contest. Safdar Gill won this election by defeating a PMLQ candidate Khalil Ahmad Bajwa.

He was elected to the Provincial Assembly of the Punjab as a candidate of Pakistan Muslim League (Nawaz) from Constituency PP-274 (Bahawalpur-VIII) in the 2013 Pakistani general election.

He was re-elected to the Provincial Assembly of the Punjab as a candidate of PML-N from Constituency PP-248 (Bahawalpur-IV) in the 2018 Pakistani general election. He defeated PTI candidate Zain Bukhari.

In the 2024 General Election, Muhammad Afzal Gill was defeated by the independent woman politician Farzana Khalil Bajwa.
