= Patan minara =

Patan Minara
- پتن منارہ
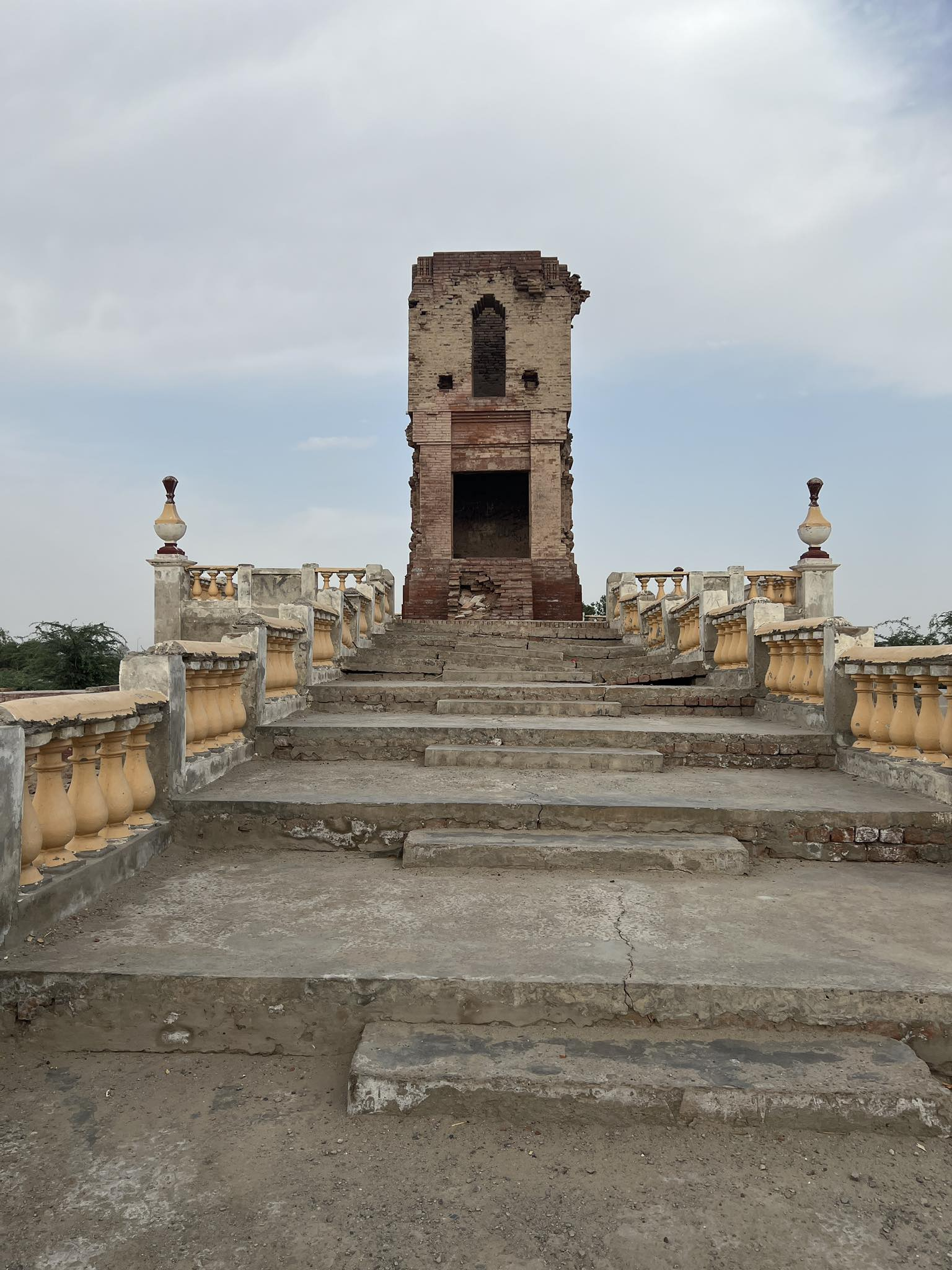
- The solitary brick tower of Patan Minara
- Interactive map of the Patan Minara area

General information
- Type: Brick tower, stupa
- Location: Cholistan Desert, near Rahim Yar Khan, Punjab, Pakistan
- Coordinates: 28.3216°N 70.1726°E
- Completed: c. 250 BCE (est.)

Technical details
- Material: Baked brick, lime mortar

Patan Minara (Urdu: پتن منارہ) is a solitary burnt-sienna brick tower standing about 8 km east of Rahim Yar Khan on the margin of the Cholistan Desert in south-western Punjab, Pakistan. Most scholars regard the column as the only visible remnant of a much larger ancient settlement that local folklore dates to five millennia, while archaeological opinion usually places its construction in the Hakra-Valley phase of the Mauryan Empire around 250 BCE.

== History ==
The tower takes its name from the vanished river port of Pattan Pur, literally "tower at the ford", which once stood on a navigable branch of the Ghaggar-Hakra River. Alexander-era folklore claims that Alexander the Great converted an earlier Buddhist stupa into a watch-tower and garrisoned a Greek cantonment here during his 325 BCE campaign. After the Ghaggar changed course in late antiquity the settlement declined, leaving only the central spire and earth-covered mounds marking a fort, tank and residential blocks.

The Gazetteer of Bahawalpur State (1904) contains the earliest detailed colonial description, noting a single west-facing doorway and no internal stair, evidence that timber ladders once reached the upper stage. In 1870 Colonel Henry Minchin, political agent of Bahawalpur, ordered a treasure dig but halted work when labourers broke into a tunnel filled with putrid liquid and venomous flies, a tale later retold by travel writers.

By the early 20th century four companion minarets and parts of the brick fortification had already been quarried away, and present-day preservationists warn that unregulated sand-extraction and a municipal sewage outfall threaten the leaning tower with collapse. Cultural use nevertheless continues: in March 2021 Cholistan’s Hindu community held a music gathering at the site to honour folk singer Krishan Lal Bheel.

== Architecture ==
The surviving shaft is built of kiln-fired bricks set in fine lime mortar and rises from a square plinth whose corners still show traces of stair-base masonry for the vanished ancillary turrets. A 2011 survey in the Journal of Research in Architecture and Planning classified the tower as a “fair-face” brick Hindu temple spire, noting that its brickwork and jointing technique match pre-Islamic shrines in Sindh and Rajasthan. 1904 Gazetteer record a recessed entrance on the west façade and shallow blind niches that may once have framed sculpted reliefs of a Buddhist cella, though no secure ornamental fragments survive in situ.

Sub-surface reconnaissance and eyewitness reports indicate a brick-lined tank, radiating tunnels and the footings of four subsidiary towers, suggesting a planned religious-cum-administrative complex rather than an isolated beacon. The absence of internal staircases further supports the hypothesis that an external wooden gallery or ladder system, common in early South-Asian temple architecture, originally provided vertical circulation.
