= List of Urdu universities =

This is a list of universities where instruction is given through the language of Urdu.

- Dr. Abdul Haq Urdu University, a bi-lingual university located in India.
- Federal Urdu University, a public research university located in Pakistan.
- Maulana Azad National Urdu University, a Central University in India named after India's first Minister of Education.
- Osmania University, a public state university and one of the largest university systems in India.
