= Khawaja Fareed University of Engineering and Information Technology =

University in Punjab, Pakistan

Coordinates: 28.3808°N 70.3745°E

Khwaja Fareed University of Engineering and Information Technology Rahim Yar Khan
- Other names: KFUEIT
- Type: Public
- Established: 2014
- Academic affiliations: Pakistan Engineering Council, Pakistan Bar Council, Pakistan Allied Health Professional Council, NCEAC, NBCEAC]], NAEAC, Higher Education Commission (Pakistan)
- Chancellor: Governor of the Punjab
- Vice-Chancellor: Prof. Dr. Ir, Mr Amir Azam Khan
- Location: Rahim Yar Khan, Punjab, Pakistan
- Campus: Main Campus Abu Dhabi RYK & RajanPur.
- Nickname: KF-UEIT, KF-UE&IT, ITU RYK
- Website: kfueit.edu.pk

The Khwaja Fareed University of Engineering and Information Technology (KFUEIT) is a public university located in Rahim Yar Khan, Punjab, Pakistan. It was established in 2014 on the initiative of the then Chief Minister of Punjab Mian Muhammad Shahbaz Sharif. It was named after the famous Sufi poet Khwaja Ghulam Fareed.

== Programs ==
The university offers the following degree programs: BS Saif ul Rehaman ORIC

- BS Mechanical Engineering
- BS Civil Engineering
- BS Electrical Engineering
- BS Computer Engineering
- BS Software Engineering
- BS Chemical Engineering
- BS Agricultural Engineering
- BS Computer Science
- BS Information Technology
- BS Data Science
- BS Artificial Intelligence
- BS Physics
- BS Mathematics
- BS Chemistry
- BS English
- BBA
- BS Optometry
- BS Cosmetology & Dermatology
- BS Radiology
- BS Medical Laboratory Technology
- BS Clinical Psychology
- BS Forensic Science
- BS Botany
- BS Zoology
- BS Biochemistry
- BS Biotechnology
- BS Material Science
- BS Environmental Science
- BS Bioinformatics
- BS Food Science & Technology
- BS Human Nutrition & Dietetics
- BS History
- BS International Relations
- BS Media & Communication
- BS Pakistan Studies
- BS Urdu
- BS Physical Education
- BS Political Science
- BS Fine Arts
- BS Economics
- BS Telecommunication System
- BS Public Administration
- B.Ed.
- DPT
- Pharm D
- LLB
- BS Nursing
- BS Computational PHYSICS
- MBA Executive
- MSc Chemistry
- MSc Physics
- MSc Computer Science
- MSc Mathematics
- MS Engineering Management
- MS Chemical Engineering
- MS Computer Science
- MS Information Technology
- MS Chemistry
- MS Mathematics
- MS Software Engineering

== See also ==
- List of universities in Pakistan
- List of engineering universities and colleges in Pakistan
