= National Council for Tibb =

Body to promote the homoeopathic system of medicine in Pakistan

- Abbreviation: NCT
- Formation: 1965
- Type: Traditional medicine
- Headquarters: Islamabad, Pakistan
- Location: Islamabad
- Region served: Pakistan
- Members: 22
- President: Hk. Muhammad Ahmad Saleemi
- Vice President: Hk. Sirajuddin Chandio
- Affiliations: Higher Education Commission of Pakistan
- Website: https://www.nct.gov.pk

National Council for Tibb (Urdu: قومی طبی کونسل) is a body corporate, established under section 3 of The Unani, Ayurvedic and Homoeopathic Practitioners Act, 1965, to promote the Unani and Ayurvedic system of medicine. It is responsible for developing curriculum, education and examination of Tibb-e-Unani and Ayurveda and for registration of Tabibs/Hakims and Vaids who passed the examination.

National Council for Tibb is recognized by the Higher Education Commission of Pakistan as an accreditation council of Pakistan.

In September 2024, the Government of Pakistan decided to merge the National Council for Homeopathy and the National Council for Tibb to form the National Council of Traditional, Alternative and Complimentary Medicine. In October 2024, traditional medical leaders in Pakistan, including Hk. Abdul Karim Nasir, Prof. Hk. Jafar Ali Abbasi and Hk. Fazlur Rehman Azad, rejected the government's decision to merge the National Council for Tibb and the National Council for Homeopathy, viewing it as an attempt to eliminate Unani medicine and homeopathy. In mid-November 2024, the Pakistan Tibbi Conference Khyber Pakhtunkhwa rejected the government's proposal to merge the National Medical Council and the National Homeopathic Council into a third council. In November 2024, Dr. Waheed Ahmed Hijazi, leader of the All Balochistan Homeopathic Doctors Forum, condemned the merger of the National Council for Homeopathy and the National Council for Medicine, He argued that the merger would create administrative problems and compromise the autonomy of the regulatory bodies.
