= National Council for Homeopathy =

Regulating body for homeopathic medicine in Pakistan

The National Council for Homeopathy (NCH) is an autonomous body constituted to regulate the education and registration of homeopathic medical practitioners in Pakistan.

== History ==
The Government of Pakistan officially recognized Homeopathic System of Medicine in 1965 and the Board of Homeopathic System of Medicine was established under UAH act 1965.

The Board of Homeopathic System of Medicine working under the ministry of health, Pakistan was renamed The National Council for Homoeopathy (NCH).

In 1990 second office of National council for Homoeopathy was established in Islamabad, Pakistan.

After 5 years, new office NCH was purchased at Rawalpindi.

Karachi the board of Homeopathic system of medicine was formed in 1965, when homeopathic system of medicine was recognized by the Government of Pakistan under the Unani, Ayurvedic and Homeopathic Practitioners Act, 1965.

In September 2024, the Government of Pakistan decided to merge the National Council for Homeopathy and the National Council for Tibb to form the National Council of Traditional, Alternative and Complimentary Medicine. In November 2024, Dr. Waheed Ahmed Hijazi, leader of the All Balochistan Homeopathic Doctors Forum, condemned the merger of the National Council for Homeopathy and the National Council for Medicine, He argued that the merger would create administrative problems and compromise the autonomy of the regulatory bodies.

== Overview ==
The council consisted of 21 members. Four members, being registered homeopaths, are nominated by the provincial government, one from each province eleven members are elected from among the registered and listed homeopaths, two members are elected from among themselves by the teachers of recognized homeopathy institutions and four members are nominated by the Federal Government, of whom one a scientist from the related field and one Deputy Secretary (Budget), Ministry of National Health Services, Regulation and Coordination.

The election of members are held after five years on provincial basis by direct balloting system. All registered homeopathic practitioners cast their votes for all seats of their related province. The council accredits and registers the four year Diploma in Homeopathic Medicine and Surgery (D.H.M.S.) and the five year Bachelor of Homeopathic Medicine and Surgery (B.H.M.S.) degree programs by different colleges and universities throughout Pakistan.

National Council for Homeopathy is a regulating body in Pakistan to accredit homeopathy facilities and is affiliated with the Higher Education Commission of Pakistan.

== See also ==
- Homeopathy
