= Islamia University of Bahawalpur =

Public university in Punjab, Pakistan

The Islamia University of Bahawalpur
- Former name: Jamia Abbasia
- Motto: Mind and Hand
- Type: Public
- Established: 1925
- Affiliations: Higher Education Commission (Pakistan), Pakistan Engineering Council, Pakistan Veterinary Medical Council, Pharmacy Council of Pakistan, Pakistan Bar Council, National Council for Homeopathy, National Council for Tibb
- Chancellor: Governor of the Punjab
- Vice-Chancellor: Dr.Muhammad Kamran
- Location: Bahawalpur, Punjab, Pakistan
- Campus: Urban and Rural
- Website: iub.edu.pk

The Islamia University of Bahawalpur (IUB), formerly known as Jamia Abbasia, is a public university located in Bahawalpur, Punjab, Pakistan. It is the only government university within the division, offering standard education both practical and theoretical.

== History ==
Islamia University began as Jamia Abbasia, a religious university established in Bahawalpur in 1925 following the academic pursuits of Al-Azhar University in Egypt. In 1975, Jamia Abbasia was declared a general university and renamed as The Islamia University of Bahawalpur.

== Overview ==
The university started at the Abbasia and Khawaja Fareed campuses with ten departments. Later, 1280 acres of land was allotted to the university on Hasilpur Road about eight kilometers away from the city center which became the Baghdad-ul-Jadeed campus. It consists of 126 teaching departments offering 300 disciples. In 2015, it was ranked 11th in the general (large) category of universities.

== Faculties ==
The Islamia University Bahawalpur has currently fifteen functional faculties which are listed as,

- Faculty of Law
- Faculty of Education
- Faculty of Chemical & Biological Sciences
- Faculty of Physical & Mathematical Sciences
- Faculty of Management Sciences and Commerce
- Faculty of Computing
- Faculty of Social sciences
- Faculty of Pharmacy
- Faculty of Islamic Learning
- Faculty of Arts and Languages
- Faculty of Engineering
- Faculty of Veterinary and Animal Sciences
- Faculty of Agriculture and Environment
- Faculty of Medicine and Allied Health Sciences
- Faculty of Online and Distance Education

== Sub campuses ==
Islamia University added two more campuses in 2005: One covering eastern side of Bahawalpur Division (in Bahawalnagar; known as IUB Bahawalnagar Campus) and the other one to cover western side of Bahawalpur Division (in Rahim Yar Khan; known as IUB - Rahim Yar Khan Campus or IUB - RYK Campus).

== Scandal ==
On 24 July 2023, the Chief Security Officer of Islamia University was arrested by police at a checkpoint as he was actively attempting to flee. A search of his vehicle led to the discovery of various drugs and medicines commonly used for sexual pleasure. The police also discovered more than 5500 obscene videos and pictures of women, many of which were of university staff members and students. A 5-member body to investigate the scandal was formed by The Higher Education Commission (HEC) on 28 July 2023. Punjab interim Chief Minister Mohsin Naqvi also formed a 3-member inquiry committee to investigate the sale of drugs in the university.

== Corruption ==
In 2024, Dr. Athar Mahboob, the Vice Chancellor (VC) of Islamia University Bahawalpur (IUB), faced serious allegations of financial corruption and administrative irregularities during his tenure. Investigations revealed that Dr. Mahboob had misappropriated funds intended for the university's Cultural Day event. Further scrutiny uncovered that he had recruited staff without following proper procedures, bypassing the required advertisements and application processes, and hired inexperienced professionals for teaching positions. Additionally, it was found that he used public funds to purchase a luxury car.

These actions prompted an investigation by the Department of Higher Education South Punjab, which led to the formation of a fact-finding committee to thoroughly examine Dr. Mahboob's conduct and the extent of the financial misconduct. In response, Punjab's Chief Minister, Mohsin Naqvi, formed a three-member inquiry committee, comprising senior government officials, to conduct a comprehensive investigation into the allegations. The findings from these inquiries are expected to be presented to the Chief Minister for further action, including possible legal proceedings.

In addition to Dr. Mahboob's case, the Anti-Corruption Establishment (ACE) arrested Rizwan Majeed, the IT Director of IUB, on allegations of corruption and financial irregularities. Majeed was arrested, and the case remains under investigation. It was revealed that Majeed had a history of malpractice from his previous employment at Khawaja Farid University, which was hidden by IUB's previous administration. Despite this, Majeed was entrusted with several important positions at IUB, where he managed financial affairs involving millions of rupees.

== Removal of VC ==
In 2024, the Chief Minister's Inspection Team (CMIT) recommended the removal of Dr. Athar Mahboob, the Vice Chancellor (VC) of Islamia University Bahawalpur (IUB), after an inquiry revealed significant financial irregularities and illegal appointments. The investigation, initiated on complaints from former IUB officials, confirmed allegations of misappropriation of funds, including a financial irregularity of Rs. 5 million for a two-day cultural event in 2020. Other findings included the illegal appointment of three treasurers for a single post and 100 unapproved appointments, along with violations in the recruitment of faculty members. The CMIT also uncovered misuse of emergency powers in appointing chairpersons for various departments. Following the inquiry, the CMIT suggested Dr. Mahboob's removal from the VC post, and recommended barring him from holding any future government positions. Furthermore, the CMIT proposed that the case be forwarded to the Anti-Corruption Establishment for further investigation into the financial irregularities.

== List of Vice-Chancellors ==
Sr. No	Name of the Vice Chancellor	Tenure	Ref.
18.	Muhammad Kamran	17 October 2024 to Present	
17.	Naveed Akhtar	26 July 2023 to 16 October 2024	
16.	Athar Mahboob	26-July-2019 to 25 July 2023	
15.	Aamir Ijaz (Additional Charge)	06-Jan-2019 to 25-Jul-2019	
15.	Qaiser Mushtaq	19-Dec-2014 to 18-Dec-2018	
14.	Rao Muhammad Afzal Khan (Additional Charge)	16-Oct-2014 to 17-Dec-2014	
13.	Saleem Tariq Khan (Additional Charge)	26-Jul-2014 to 12-Oct-2014	
12.	Muhammad Mukhtar	23-Jul-2010 to 22-Jul-2014	
11.	Belal A. Khan	03-Oct-2005 to 22-Jul-2010	
10.	Munir Akhtar	03-Oct-2001 to 02-Oct-2005	
09.	Muhammad Shafiq Khan	14-Aug-1997 to 14-Aug-2001	
08.	Belal Sukhera	15-Jun-1993 to 14-Aug-1997	
07.	Misbah-ul-Ain Khan	24-Apr-1989 to 15-Jun-1993	
06.	Zulfiqar Ali Malik	19-Jan-1985 to 24-Apr-1989	
05.	Rafiq Ahmad	11-Apr-1981 to 19-Jan-1985	
04.	Abdul Qayyum Qureshi	20-Nov-1978 to 08-Apr-1981	
03.	Naseer Ahmad Nasir	02-Aug-1976 to 20-Nov-1978	
02.	Abu Bakar Ghaznavi		
01.	Hazrat Maulana Ghulam Mohammad Ghotvi (1st VC)		

== Notable alumni ==
- Allah Wasaya — Pakistani Islamic scholar
- Shahid Hussain Bhatti — Pakistani politician
- Javed Chaudhry — Pakistani journalist
- Syed Ghulam Moinuddin Gilani — Islamic leader
- Muhammad Afzal Gill — Pakistani politician

== See also ==
- List of Islamic educational institutions
