= South Punjab (region of Pakistan) =

Geopolitical region in Punjab, Pakistan

South Punjab is a geopolitical region in Punjab, Pakistan, comprising the southernmost three divisions, namely Bahawalpur, Multan and Dera Ghazi Khan.

South Punjab comprises roughly half of area of Punjab province and about 30% of its population. It also contributes over half of the agricultural output of Punjab.

== See also ==
- Central Punjab, geopolitical region in Punjab, Pakistan
