= Pakistan Maritime Museum =

Museum in Pakistan

Coordinates: 24.8868°N 67.0904°E

- پاکستان بحری عجائب گھر
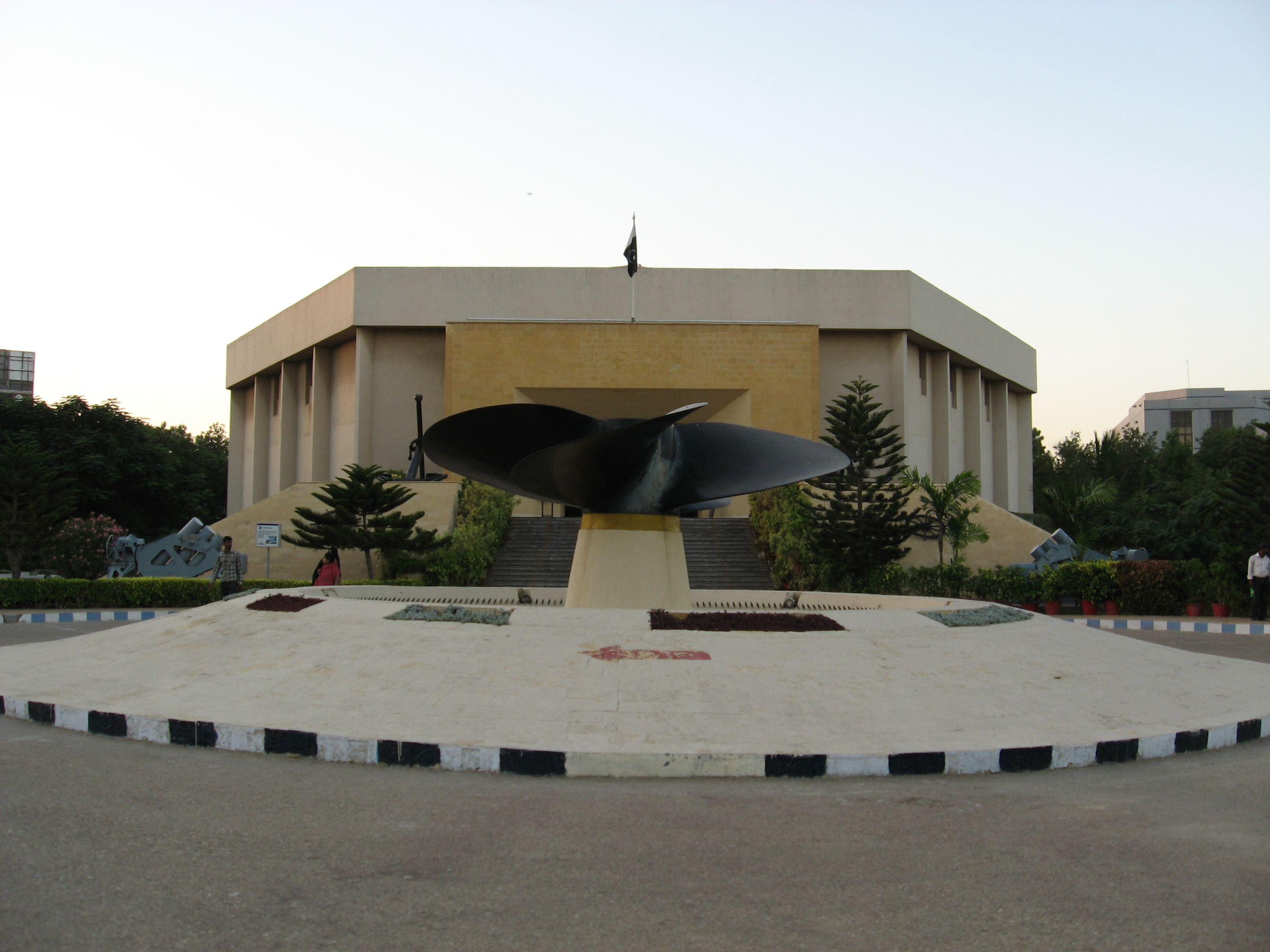
- Entrance of Museum Hall
- Established: 1997
- Location: PNS Karsaz, Karachi, Sindh, Pakistan
- Type: Naval museum
- Collection size: Naval equipment and machinery, maritime heritage and vessels.
- Website: https://pmm.com.pk/

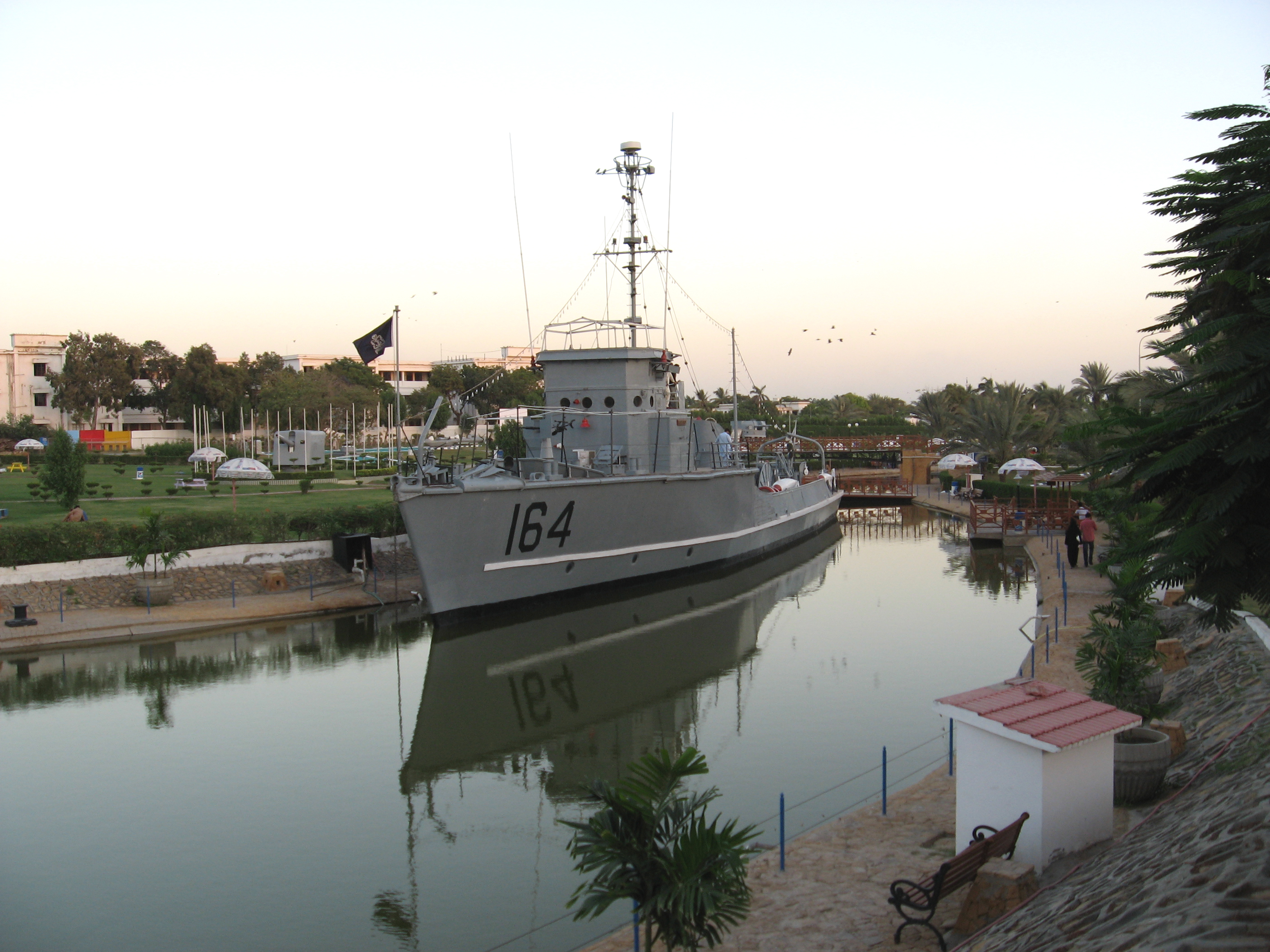
Pakistan Navy's Minesweeper PNS Mujahid (M164)

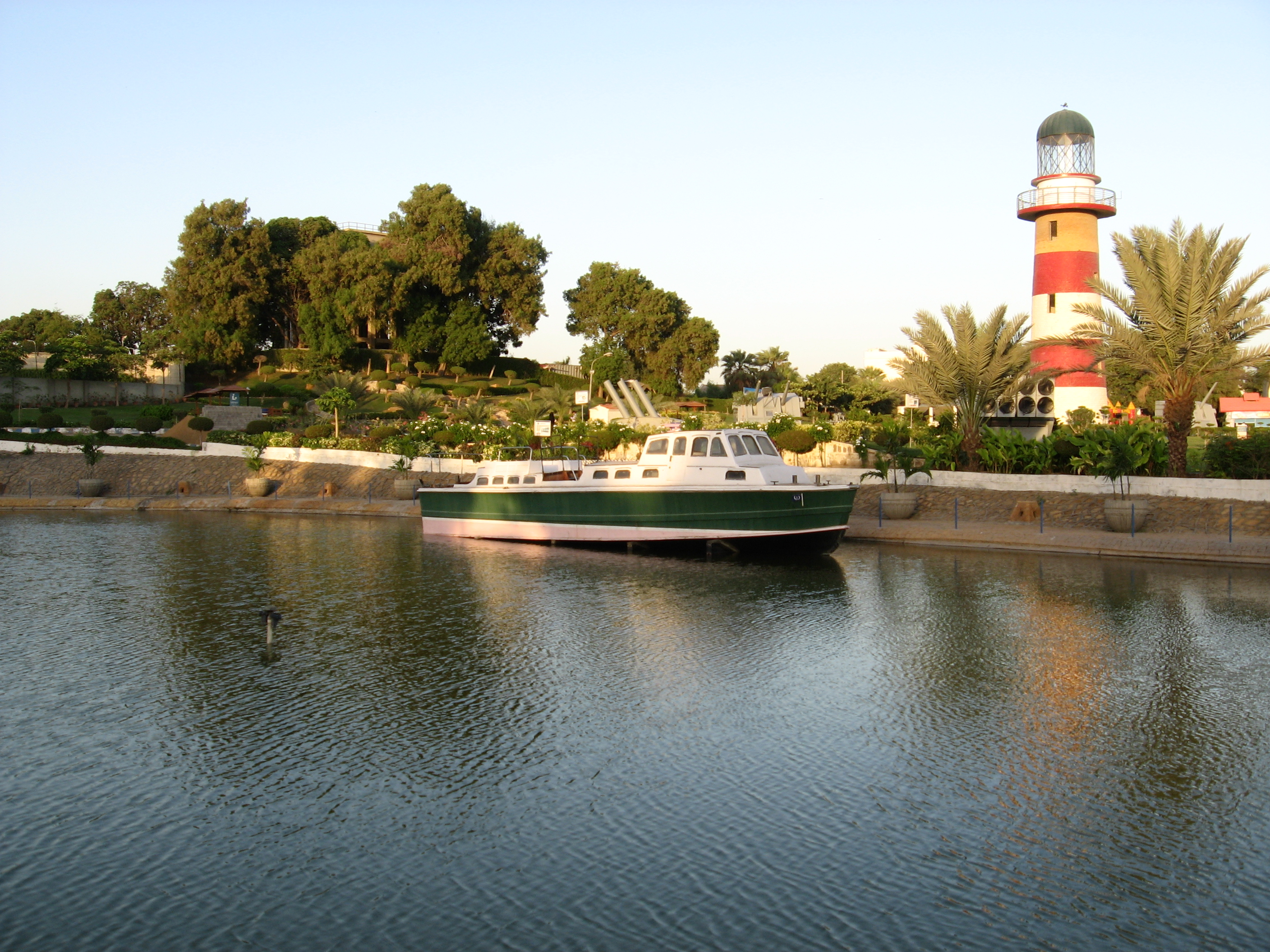
Wooden barge inside Pakistan Maritime Museum

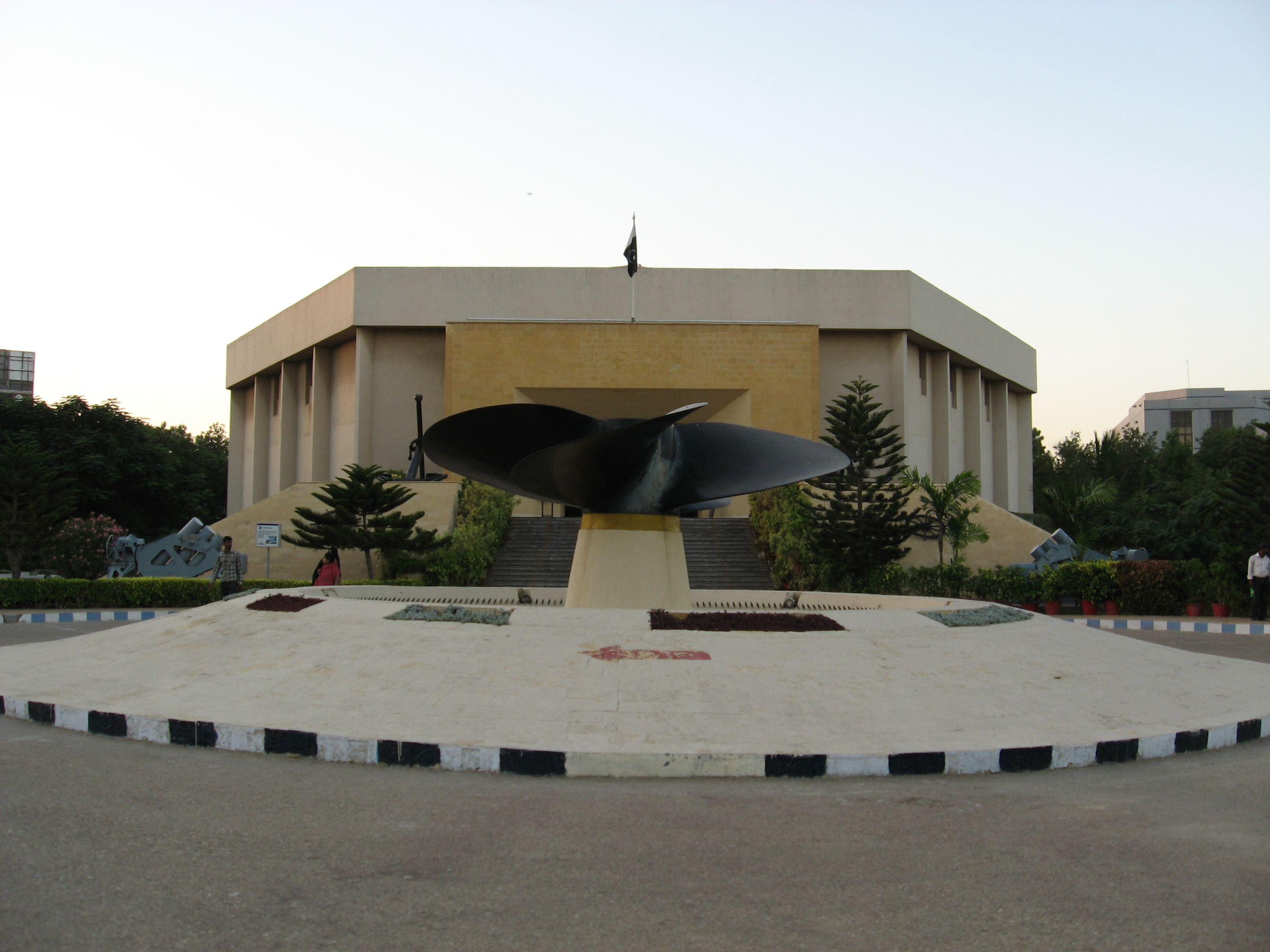
Museum Hall

Pakistan Maritime Museum (Urdu: پاک بحریہ عجائب گھر) is a maritime museum and park situated near PNS Karsaz on Habib Ibrahim Rehmatullah Road (Karsaz Road) in Karachi, Sindh, Pakistan.

The main museum building is located inside the park of 11.3 ha (28 acres). The museum also displays Daphné-class submarine PNS Hangor (S131), the minesweeper, PNS Mujahid (M164), a Breguet Atlantic aircraft, a Westland Lynx helicopter and a wooden barge that was given to the Naval Chief by the Queen in the 1960s.

== See also ==
- Pakistan Air Force Museum
- Pakistan Army Museum, Rawalpindi
- List of museums in Pakistan
