= Iqbal Manzil =

Birthplace of Muhammad Iqbal in Sialkot, Pakistan

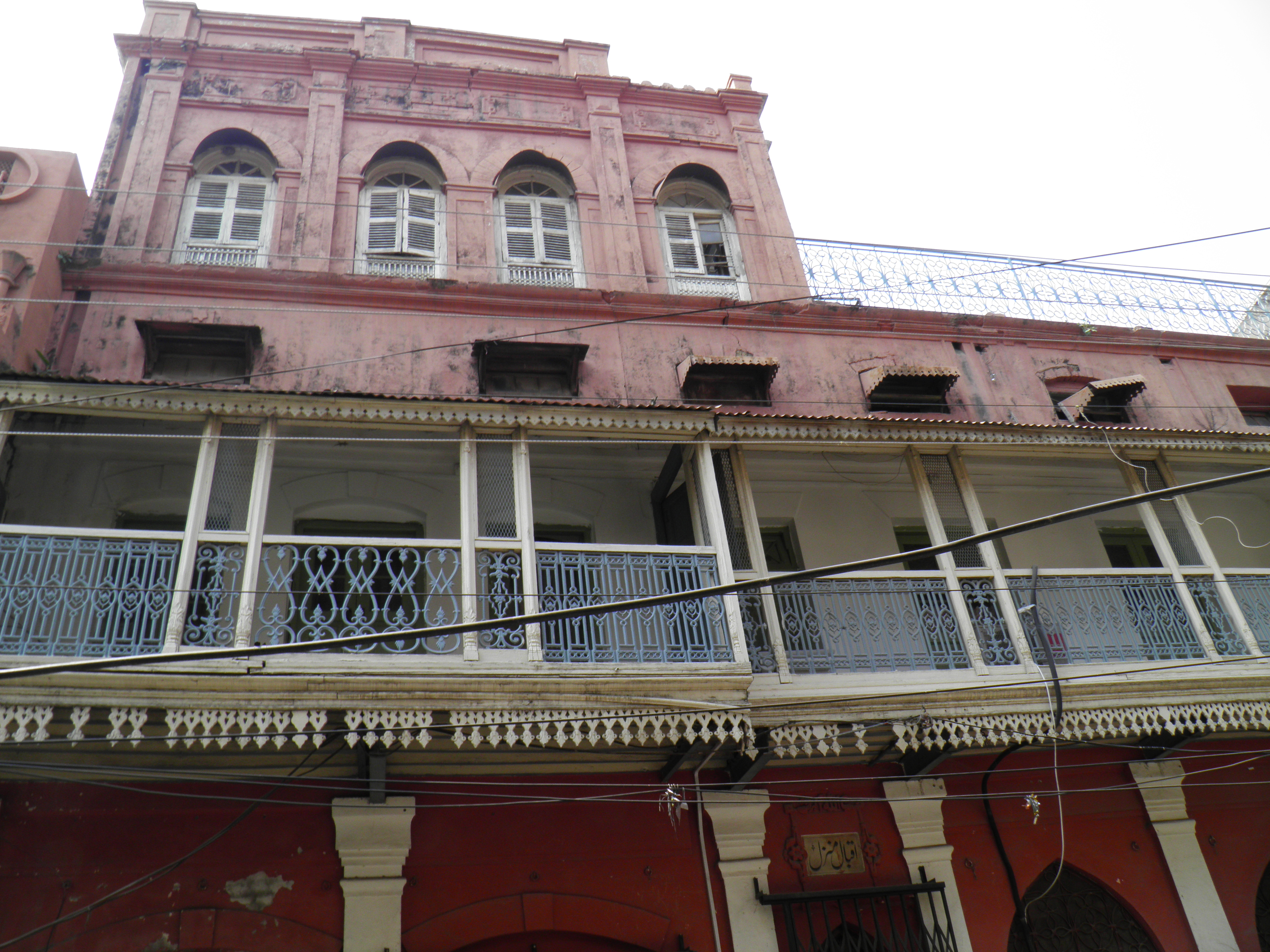

Iqbal Manzil (Urdu: اقبال منزل, lit. 'Iqbal Destination') is the birthplace of Islamic philosopher and poet Muhammad Iqbal (1877–1938). It is located in the heart of the city of Sialkot in Punjab province of Pakistan.

== History ==
Iqbal Manzil was purchased in 1861 by Mohammad Rafique, the great-grandfather of Allama Iqbal. The house was originally very small, but each successor kept adding to it and the building grew in size.

After the death of his father Noor Muhammad, Iqbal's his elder brother, Ata Mohammad, was named the owner of the Iqbal Manzil. After Ata Mohammed's death his sons left the house and took up residences in Karachi and Lahore.

Allama Iqbal's son Javed Iqbal was born at Iqbal Manzil on 5 October 1924. Javed Iqbal spent his childhood in Lahore but never entered Iqbal Manzil again. Allama Iqbal's other son Aftab Iqbal resided in Karachi for the better part of his life. Allama Iqbal also had a daughter named Munira Iqbal.

Since 1986, Riaz Hussain Naqvi has been the curator at Iqbal Manzil.

== Restoration work ==
The Government of Pakistan bought Iqbal Manzil for its restoration in 1971 and handed it over to the Archaeology Department, which aptly accorded it the status of a cultural heritage.

=== Negligence ===
However, in the early 2000s the Iqbal Manzil became a victim of negligence of the authorities who were responsible for preserving this national heritage. Cracks appeared in several walls of the decades-old building, the doors creaked. The building was in shambles. The number of visitors went from 300 in one day to only a few dozen. The back part of the building was in a dilapidated condition and mostly ignored.

=== Renovation ===
The Sialkot District Government renovated the Iqbal Manzil to save it from collapsing. The walls were repaired and whitewashed. The roof was painted. Old curtains were replaced and the second storey was carpeted. After the renovation, the number of visitors grew to about 200 per day. The government released Rs.14 million for restoring the building.

Approximately a few decades after 1988, Riaz Hussain Naqvi, the curator of Iqbal Manzil, has been actively involved in the restoration of this historic building and has been nominated for the pride of performance.

== Inside the Iqbal Manzil ==
Many tourists come to Sialkot especially to visit the Iqbal Manzil. It is the place where he lived and wrote poetry that would later stimulate the creation of the Pakistan Movement. After renovation, Iqbal Manzil was converted into a library-cum-museum. The museum was inaugurated in 1977. It consists of a guided tour through the rooms of the mansion spread out on three storeys. On display is the furniture and many other objects used by Allama Iqbal and his family decades ago.

Moreover, several rare pictures of Allama Iqbal with his family, teachers, class fellows and leaders of the All India Muslim League adorn the walls of the building. Many of these hold autographs of Allama Iqbal. Iqbal's poetry written in his own handwriting is also on display.

A pen and ink pot used by him are also on display.

=== Library ===
The library at the Iqbal Manzil holds over 4000 books, 2000 on Iqbaliyat alone, all of which were donated by visitors. Visitors can sit in the library free of cost and peruse the scholarly works at their own leisure. The library has facilitated 5 students in attaining their Ph.D on the works of Iqbal. The Punjab Government has announced to establish an advance research centre at the Iqbal Manzil which would facilitate research being conducted on Iqbal and his works. The research centre has not yet been established despite more than two years have passed since the project was approved.

== Visitors ==
Since its renovation, Iqbal Manzil has enjoyed a host of visitors who have reveled in its historic significance. Some notable visitors include the Ambassador of Tajikistan to Pakistan Mr. Sherali S. Jononov. A Japanese delegation from Osaka University, Japan also paid a visit to Iqbal Mazil and enjoyed the traditional breakfast of Hulwa Puri there.

== See also ==
- Muhammad Iqbal
- Sialkot
- List of museums in Pakistan
