= Hund Museum =

Museum in Khyber Pakhtunkhwa, Pakistan

- هنډ لرغونتون
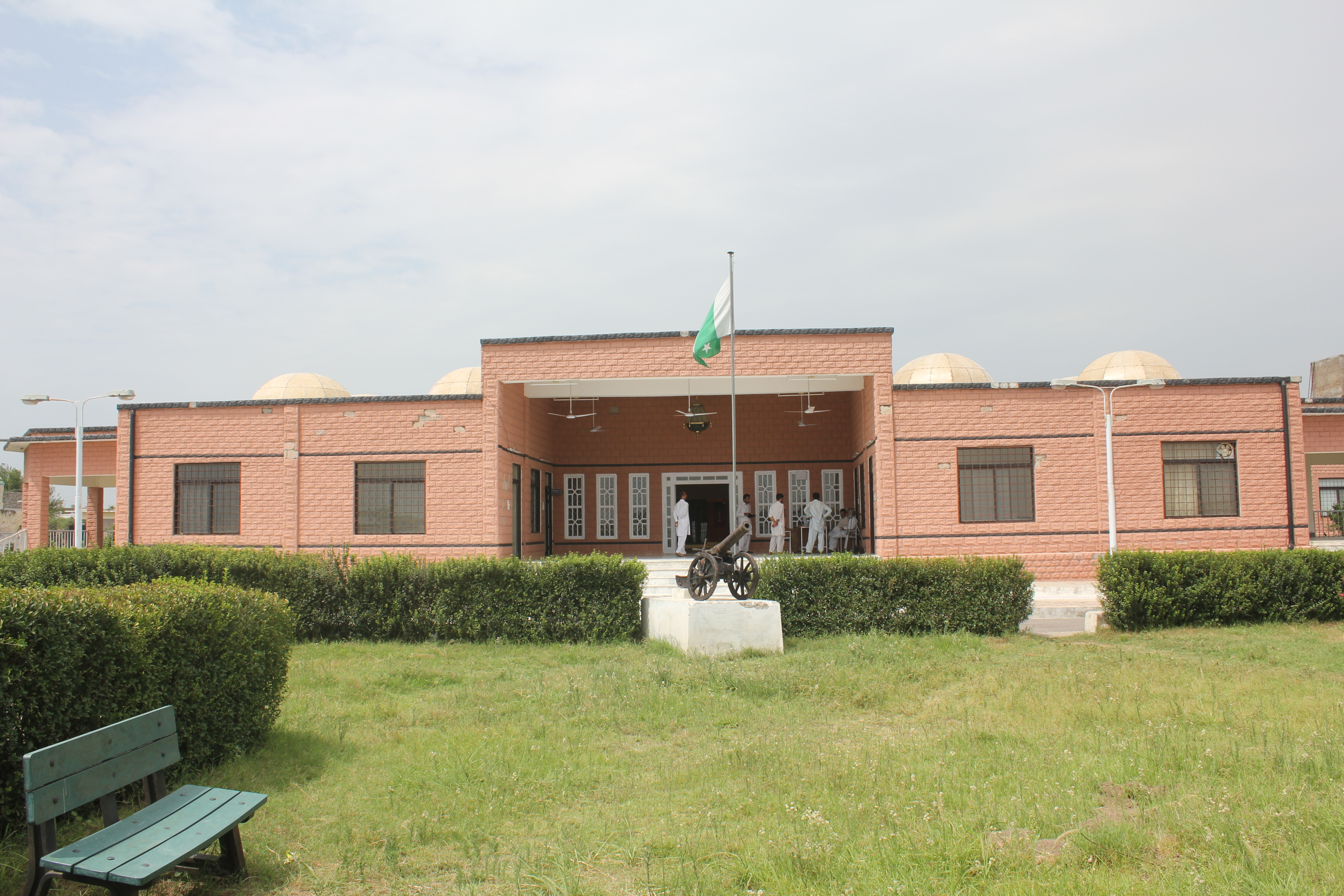
- Established: 2009; 17 years ago
- Location: Hund, Swabi district, Khyber Pakhtunkhwa, Pakistan
- Coordinates: 34.0141°N 72.4329°E
- Type: Archaeology museum
- Collection size: 800
- Founder: Dr. Ihsan Ali
- Incharge: Ijaz Ali
- Owners: Directorate of Archaeology & Museums, Government of Khyber Pakhtunkhwa
- Website: www.kparchaeology.com

Hund Museum (Pashto: هنډ لرغونتون) is an archaeology museum located in Hund, near the bank of the Indus River north of Attock, Swabi district, Khyber Pakhtunkhwa, Pakistan. It is frequented by thousands of visitors annually.

== Excavation and establishment ==
The project of the Hund archaeological and tourist site was approved in 1994 with a budget of Rs. 14.6 million. Excavation in Hund started in June 1996. At the time of excavation, beautiful houses, coins, jewellery, and other household articles from the Indo-Greek and buildings of Kushan, Hindu Shahi and Islamic eras were found. The excavated houses, buildings and others showed the wonder engineering know-how of the people of ancient times. The buildings had beautiful rooms and halls, rows of pillars, steps, floors levels and ovens. Gorgeous gateways and planned streets were also some of the features.

For the establishment of the Hund Museum, 1.6 hectares of land were acquired in 2002. This second phase was allocated a budget of Rs. 49.386 million, and included the establishment of a cafeteria, a bypass road, a rest house, and excavation expenses. Excavation resumed in 2009 under Professor Dr. Abdur Rahman, ex-Chairman of the Department of Archaeology, University of Peshawar. Artifacts from the late Kushan to the Mughal period were discovered during it.

The museum was inaugurated in 2009 by archaeologist late Dr. Ahmad Hasan Dani and then provincial culture secretary Arshad Sami Khan.

== History ==
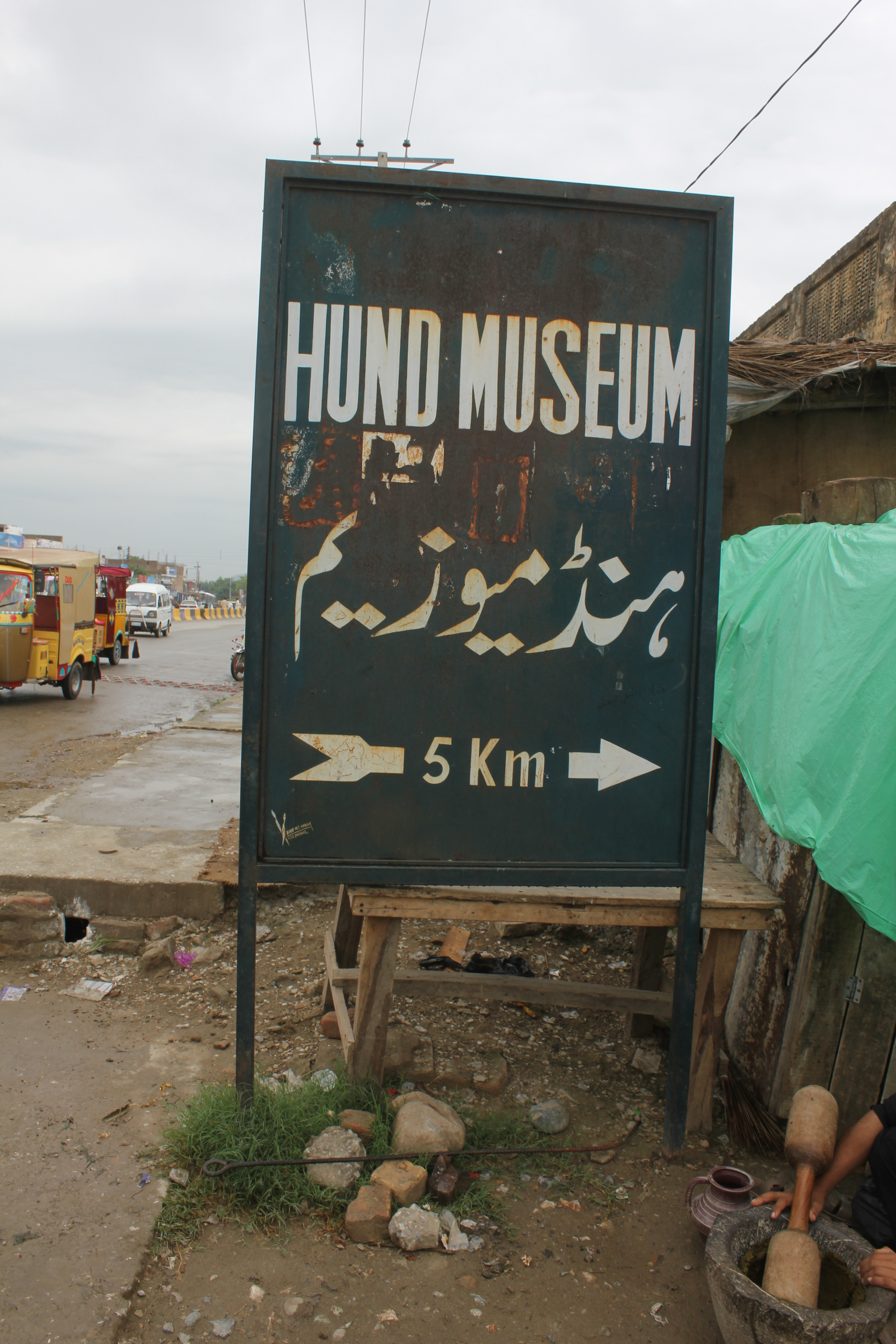
Signboard on main Swabi-Jehangira Road indicating the directions to Hund Museum

Hund is the oldest city in the Swabi district, located on the right bank of the Indus River. It has a rich history and has experienced different eras such as the Gandhara civilization, the Hindu Shahi dynasty, and the Muslim period. Alexander the Great passed by this place in 327 BC and spent a night in the village before entering the Indian plains. A Corinthian column has been erected adjacent to the museum to commemorate his stay.

Famous Chinese Buddhist monk, scholar, traveller, translator and pilgrim, Hiuen Tsang, passed through this area in 644 AD. After Peshawar and Charsadda, it was the third capital of the Hindu Shahi dynasty in the 9th century AD after Charsadda (then Pushkalavati) and Peshawar (erstwhile Purushapura). Mahmud of Ghazni, Muhammad of Ghor, and Babur are said to have passed by this place en route to their invasions of the region. Genghis Khan reportedly chased after Khwarzim Shah till Hund, where the latter jumped into the Indus.

Syed Ahmad Barelvi was received by the local ruler Khadi Khan here after his victory over the Sikh forces in 1826. However, the former's forces invaded the city after Khan conspired against him.

== See also ==
- List of museums in Pakistan
