= Kalasha Dur Museum =

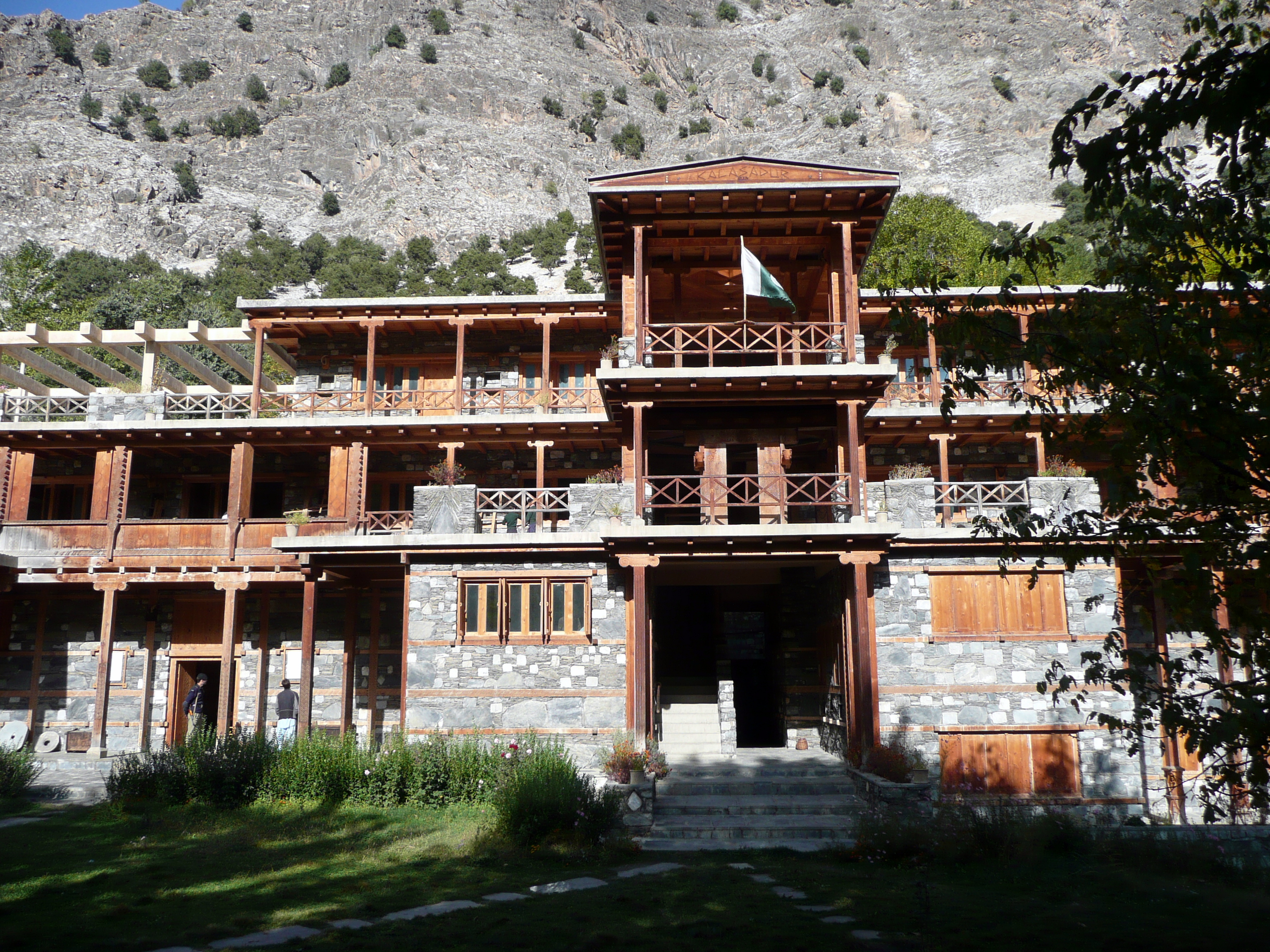
- Established: 2005; 21 years ago
- Location: Bumburet Valley, Lower Chitral District, Khyber Pakhtunkhwa, Pakistan
- Coordinates: 35.697403608506555°N 71.6821928445457°E
- Type: Archeology museum
- Collection size: 1,300
- Owners: Directorate of Archaeology & Museums, Government of Khyber Pakhtunkhwa
- Website: www.kparchaeology.com

Kalasha Dur Museum ('House of the Kalasha People' or 'Cultural Centre for the Kalasha' in Kalashamondr), also known as Bumburet Museum, is a museum located in Bumburet Valley, Lower Chitral District in the Khyber Pakhtunkhwa province of Pakistan. The museum houses a collection related to the culture and history of the Kalash people, as well as of the communities of the wider Hindu Kush area.

== Construction ==
Construction of the museum started in 2001 and was completed in 2005. Greek Volunteers, a Greek NGO, is credited with the building efforts under teacher Athanasios Lerounis. The Greek government body, Hellenic Aid, helped them in their efforts. The museum and its adjacent grounds cover around four kanals of land. A combination of traditional design and modern techniques was used in its construction. Walls made of stone cover the concrete framework, while the characteristic parallel wooden beams and carved verandas also feature in its design. A temple dedicated to Jestak, a local deity believed to protect generations, has also been constructed near the entrance.

The second floor of the building contains a school of Kalash culture, with a library containing various books on the valley. A hall housing a professional training institute for local craftsmen is also present there.

== Collection ==
The museum exhibits around 1,300 items related to the indigenous Kalash population, including a collection of weapons, everyday items, tools, clothes, jewelry, and musical instruments. Some of the artifacts have been bought from other areas, while some of them have been donated by the people of the three Kalash valleys (Bumburet, Birir, and Rumbur).

== History ==
Bumburet Valley Museum is also known as the Kalasha Dur. It is a place where a number of collected objects are displayed. Most of these objects were collected by the members of the NGO Greek Volunteers based in Greece. They had been working in the Kalasha dur valleys since 1995.

=== Ethnological collection ===
The building has two floors – the ground floor has the ethnological collection of the Kalasha culture and the wider Hindu Kush area, while the first floor houses a school of Kalasha culture with a library of books written on the valley, and also a hall for professional training of local crafts. The members of the Greek Volunteers were responsible for much of the collection exhibited in the museum. Volunteers would visit the Kalasha Valleys with a view to buying traditional objects or exchanging them for modern ones. A lot of worry and anxiety was experienced by the members of the Greek Volunteers when they noticed that the New Kalasha Generation would never see the traditional objects of their ancestors. This observation prompted the buying of objects, clothes and other common items so that they would not disappear from the valleys. Their first aim was to exhibit all these objects in an Ethnological Museum, so future generations would be able to see and learn about the life of their ancestors. Later on, when the Kalasha Dur Museum was built, the number of collected objects began to increase. The many offerings by the Kalasha people and inhabitants of the Kalasha valleys to the museum increased the number of items beyond that which was purchased. The Museum also purchased traditional utensils and other objects which had left the settlements of the Hindu Kush, from the antique shops of Peshawar and Chitral to enrich their collection.

== See also ==
- Kalash people
- Chitral Museum
- List of museums in Pakistan
