= Chitral Museum =

Museum in Khyber Pakhtunkhwa, Pakistan

- د چترال موزیم
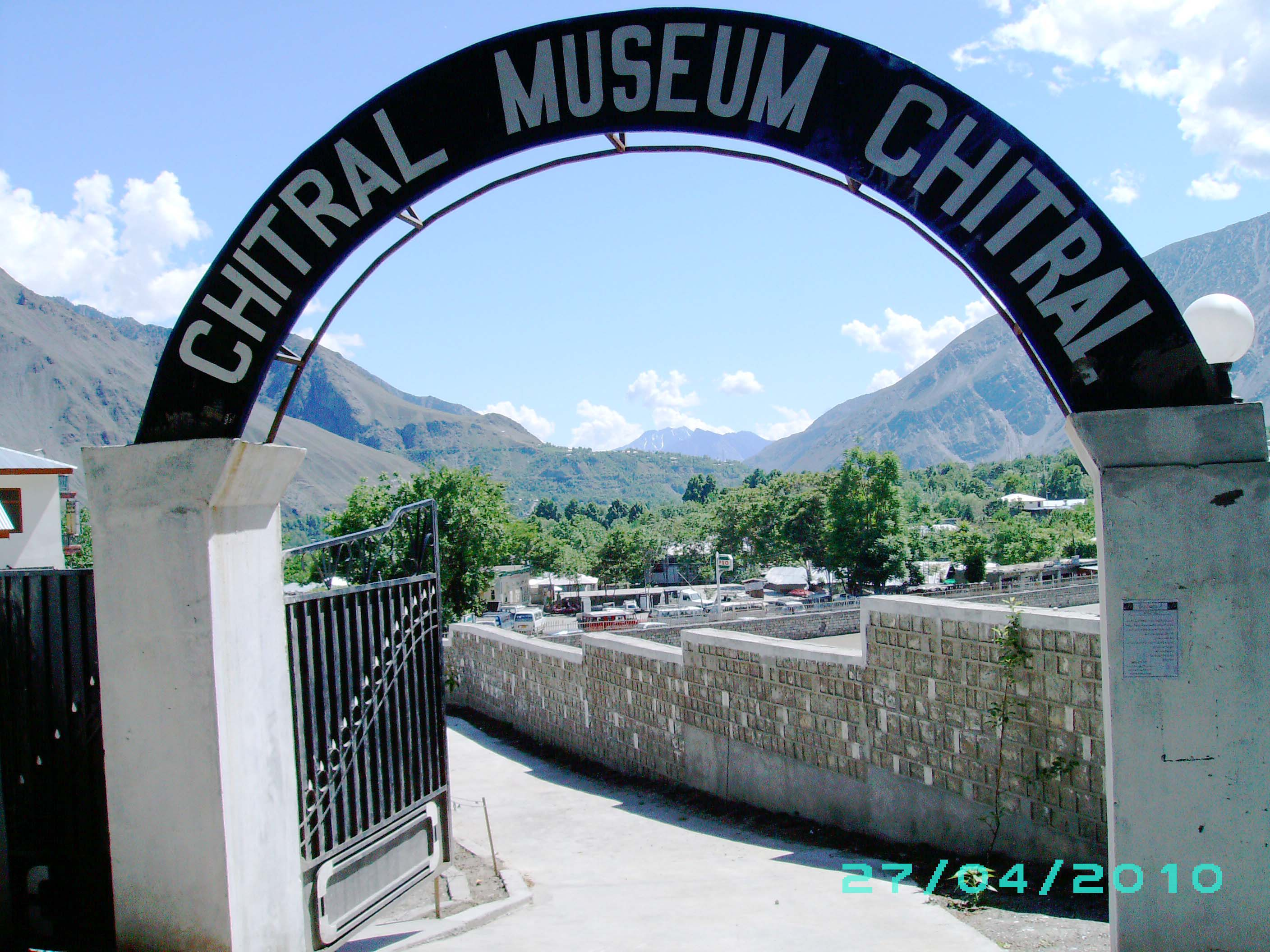
- Established: 2010
- Location: Chitral District, Khyber Pakhtunkhwa, Pakistan
- Coordinates: 35.8477°N 71.7837°E
- Owner: Government of Khyber Pakhtunkhwa
- Website: www.kparchaeology.com

Chitral Museum is a museum located in Chitral District, Khyber Pakhtunkhwa, Pakistan. It was established on 8 July 2010.

== History ==
The Chitral region is located in deep defiles, tough mountains, flowing rivers and green valley is the most secluded region of the Khyber Pakhtunkhwa. The idea of Chitral Museum came into being in order to preserve and protect the rich cultural heritage of Chitral. The museum is housing two galleries, Ethnological Gallery and Archaeological & Kalash Gallery.

== Ethnological gallery ==
The ethnological gallery exposing the culture and manner of life of Chitral valley. The gallery include embroidery, jewelry, weapons, ceramics, musical instruments, hunting tools, furniture and household objects. The embroidery includes shirts from Kohistan regions, Swat and Nooristan, female purse, waist coats, caps, table mats, pillow covers etc. The jewelry displayed in the gallery represents the cultural trends containing copper and silver bangles, pendants, ear rings, finger rings, necklaces, bracelets, amulets, ornaments, head ornaments, torques, anklets and shoulder. The Museum has a variety of weapons including gunpowder containers, pistols, guns, Canons, daggers and swords. These objects elucidate the tradition and culture of Chitral valley during 19th and early 12th centuries. The museum having also a rich collection of traditional ceramics comprises wooden and stone cooking pots, teapots, water pitcher, bowls, spoons, trays etc. are on display.

== Archaeological and Kalash Gallery ==
The Archaeological and Kalash gallery houses the cultural materials and archaeological antiquities of Kalash valley. The gallery also showing the deep cultural heritage of the Kalash valley. It displays architectural elements, household objects, head dresses, dresses, jewelry, effigies of kalasha goddesses, and wooden commemorative effigies. Archaeological collection exhibits at museum mainly consists of Gandhara Grave antiquities including pottery, semi-precious stone beads, spear heads, arrow heads, bangles, finger rings, pendants and others jewelry. These are discovered in the excavations led by the Directorate of Archaeology and Museums of Government of Khyber Pakhtunkhwa at the sites of Sangoor and Parwak.

== See also ==
- Kalasha Dur Museum
- List of museums in Pakistan
