= Archaeological Museum Umerkot =

- عمرکوٹ عجائب گھر
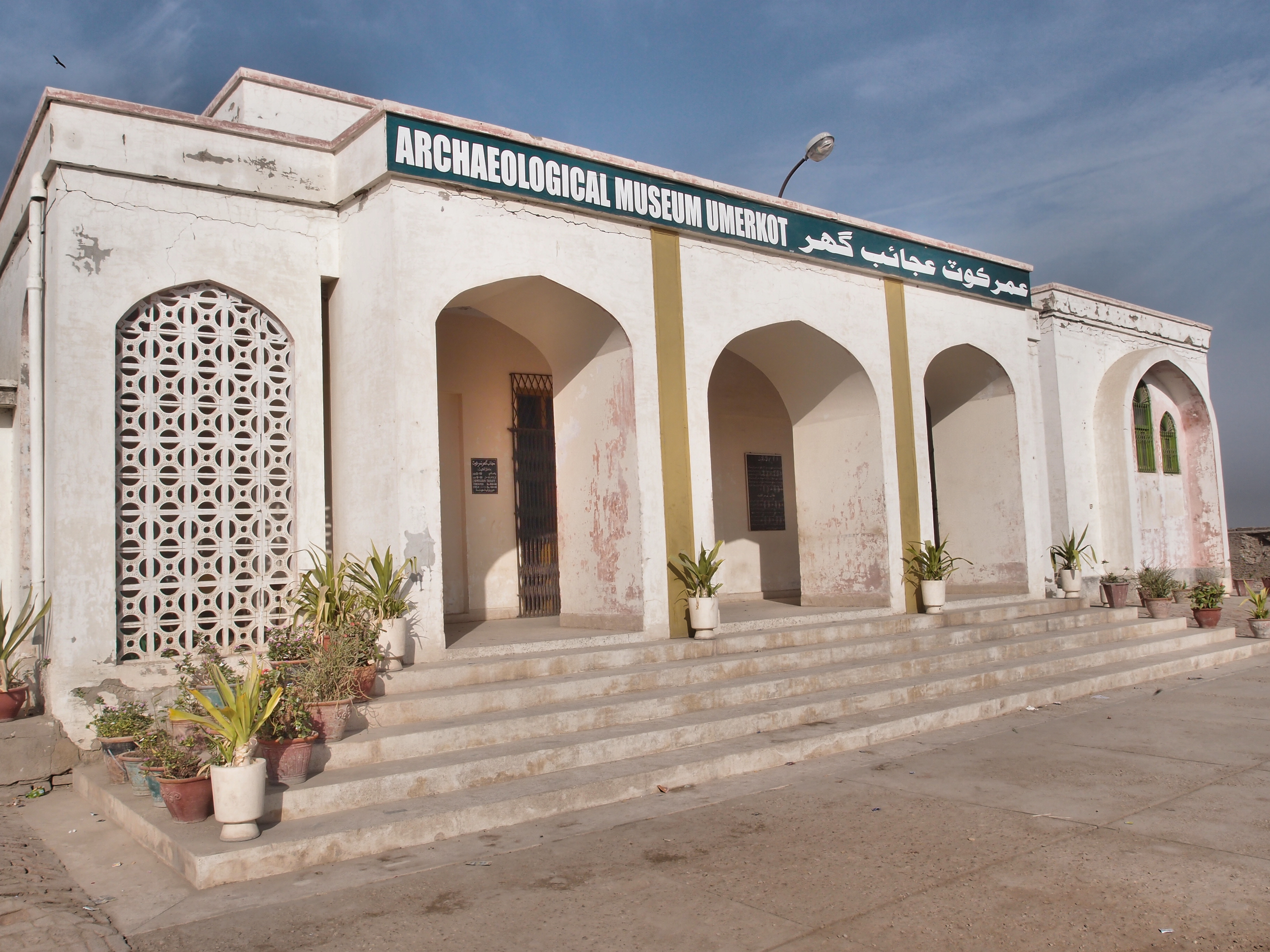
- Established: 24 February 1968; 58 years ago
- Location: Umerkot District, Sindh Province, Pakistan
- Coordinates: 25°21′51″N 69°44′03″E
- Type: Archaeology museum
- Visitors: 40,518 (2018)
- Curator: Ghulam Hussain Burdi
- Owner: Government of Sindh
- Website: antiquities.sindhculture.gov.pk/tour/archaeological-museum-umerkot/

Archaeological Museum Umerkot, or Umerkot Museum, is an archaeological museum situated inside the Umerkot Fort which is located in Umerkot District, Sindh Province, Pakistan. It was inaugurated on 24 February 1968, and was relocated to its current building in July 2006.

It consists of three galleries and two lobbies. The collection includes coins dating back to the Mughal era, ancient weapons, documents, paintings, and calligraphic specimens. Photographs showing the life of Tharparkar locals are also present.

It received 29,673 visitors in 2017, which increased to 40,518 in 2018.

== See also ==
- List of museums in Pakistan
