= List of museums in Pakistan =

This is a list of museums, galleries, and related building structures in Pakistan.

== Museums and galleries ==
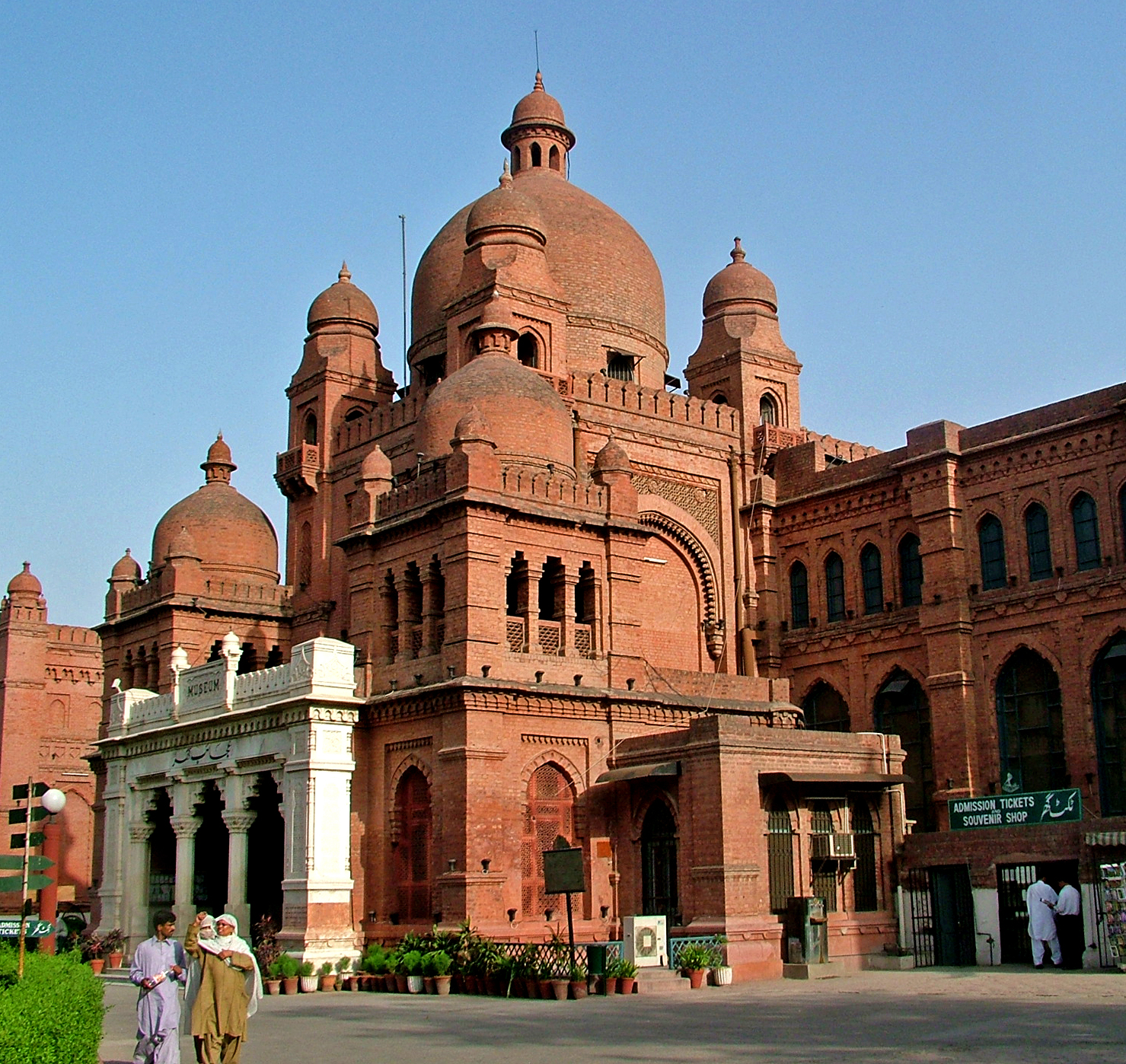
View of entrance to Lahore Museum

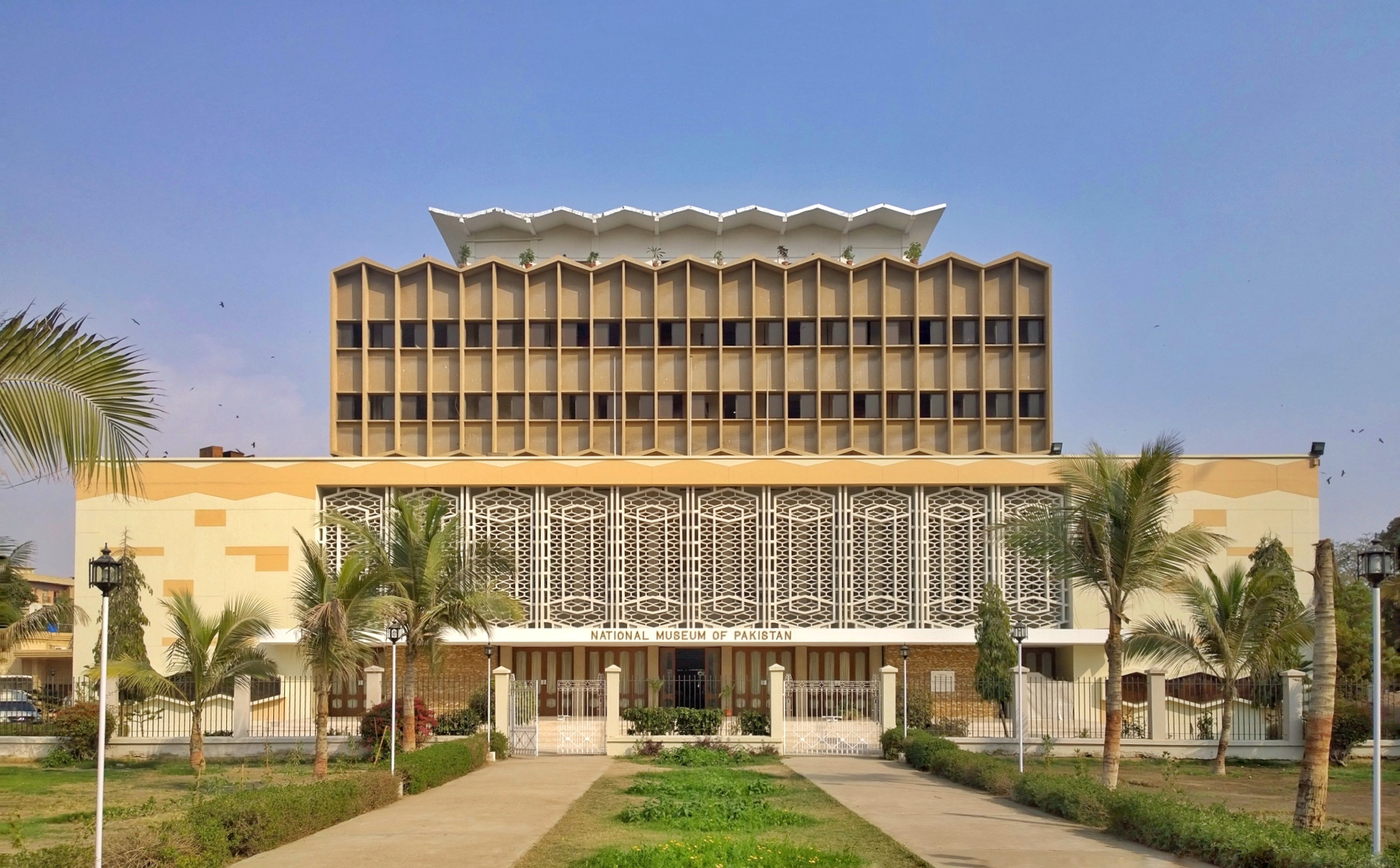
Front view of National Museum of Pakistan, Karachi

=== Archaeological and historical museums ===
- Abbott Museum, Abbottabad
- Archaeological Museum Banbhore
- Archaeological Museum Umerkot
- Bahawalpur Museum, Bahawalpur
- Bannu Museum, Bannu
- Badshahi Mosque Museum, Lahore
- Chitral Museum
- City Museum, Gorkhatri, Peshawar
- Dir Museum, Chakdara
- Gujrat Museum, Gujrat
- Harappa Museum, Harappa
- Hund Museum, Swabi
- Kasur Museum, Kasur
- Kalasha Dur Museum, Chitral
- Lahore Museum, Lahore
- Lahore Fort Museum, Lahore
- Lok Virsa Museum, Islamabad
- Lyallpur Museum, Faisalabad
- Mardan Museum, Mardan
- Mohanjodaro Museum, Larkana
- Montgomery Museum, COMSATS Institute of Information Technology, Sahiwal
- Multan Museum, Multan
- National Museum of Pakistan, Karachi
- National History Museum, Lahore
- PAF Museum, Karachi
- Pakistan Maritime Museum, Karachi
- Pakistan Museum of Natural History, Islamabad
- Peshawar Museum, Peshawar
- Pushkalavati Museum, Charsadda
- Rohtas Fort Museum, Jhelum
- Sahibzada Abdul Qayyum Museum, University of Peshawar, Peshawar
- Sindh Museum, Hyderabad
- Sindhology, Jamshoro
- Swat Museum, Mingora
- Taxila Museum, Taxila
- Thatta Museum, Thatta
- Umer Hayat Mahal Museum, Chiniot
- Wazir Mansion, Karachi

=== Archives ===
- Sindh Archives Karachi
- National Archives of Pakistan, Islamabad
- Supreme Court of Pakistan Archives, Islamabad

=== Art galleries ===
- Abasin Arts Council, Peshawar
- Alhamra Arts Council, Lahore
- Chwkandi Art Gallery Karachi
- Como Museum, Lahore
- Faisalabad Arts Council, Faisalabad
- Fakir Khana, Lahore
- Gujranwala Arts Council, Gujranwala
- Mohatta Palace, Karachi
- Multan Arts Council, Multan
- National Art Gallery, Islamabad
- Oyster Art Gallery], Lahore
- Pakistan Arts Council, Karachi
- Rawalpindi Arts Council, Rawalpindi
- Tomb of Anarkali, Lahore
- Vogue Art Gallery, Lahore

=== Biographical museums ===
- Iqbal Manzil, Sialkot
- Javed Manzil (Allama Iqbal Museum), Lahore
- Mazar-e-Quaid Museum, Karachi
- Quaid-e-Azam House Museum (Flag Staff House), Karachi
- Wazir Mansion, Karachi

=== Heritage museums ===
- Chughtai Museum, Lahore
- Lok Virsa Museum, Islamabad
- Shakir Ali Museum, Lahore
- TDF Ghar, Karachi
- Umer Hayat Mahal, Chiniot

=== Judicial museums ===
- Lahore High Court Museum
- Supreme Court Museum, Islamabad

=== Military museums ===
- Army Museum Lahore, Lahore
- PAF Museum, Karachi
- Pakistan Army Museum, Rawalpindi
- Pakistan Maritime Museum, Karachi
- Punjab police Museum, Lahore
- Sindh Police Museum, Karachi

=== Money museums ===
- State Bank of Pakistan Museum & Art Gallery, Karachi

=== Natural history museums ===
- Natural History Museum, Karachi Zoo, Karachi
- Pakistan Museum of Natural History, Islamabad

=== Science and technology museums ===
- MagnifiScience Centre, Karachi
- National Museum of Science and Technology, Lahore

=== Transport museums ===
- Pakistan Railways Heritage Museum, near Islamabad

== See also ==
- List of libraries in Pakistan
