= Dir Museum =

Museum in Dir, Pakistan

- دير ميوزيم
- Established: 30 May 1979; 47 years ago
- Location: Chakdara, Lower Dir, Khyber Pakhtunkhwa, Pakistan
- Coordinates: 34.6629°N 72.0305°E
- Collection size: 2161
- Owner: Government of Khyber Pakhtunkhwa

Dir Museum, also known as Chakdara Museum, is located in Chakdara, Lower Dir District, in the Khyber Pakhtunkhwa province of Pakistan. The museum offers a fine and unique collection of Gandharan Art.

== Excavation ==
The excavation in Dir started during 1966-1969 in various sites under the Department of Archaeology, University of Peshawar and got the collection from the area. Dir Museum was constructed by then State Government of Dir, while the construction was proposed by Capt. Rahatulah Khan Jaral (then Political Agent of Dir Agency), and allocated a sum of Rs. 0.25 million for the construction. Later, the provincial government allocated a further fund Rs. 0.49 million for the construction of a boundary wall, residential quarters, guest house, storage and other facilities in the museum.

Saidal Khan, consultant architect of the Public Works Department KPK, is credited with designing the museum building. He was inspired by the local style of architecture, and used the indigenous Malakandi stone as the primary construction material. The building resembles a fort – with a facade containing an arched entrance, two corner picket towers, and a parapet with battlements.

== History ==
Dir Museum is based on history of Dir which is most important both historically and culturally and the history goes back to the 2nd millennium BC. The evidence of the history was gained by the excavation of numerous burials of Aryans at Timergara and other places, dating from 6th to 18th century BC. Then they were followed by the Achaemenid Empire, and the Achaemenid were expelled by the invasion of Alexander in 327 BC, and faced a great trouble in conquering the local population. After that Greek historians have paid great tributes to the population. The Greeks were followed by the Gandharan Civilization and achieved a great fame, and have most significant period there by leaving of the monumental remains of the Buddhist stupas and monasteries, a few of which are present at museum.

== History of Dir ==
Dir have an important position as a center of Gandhara Art. The Gandhara defined by the Pilgrims and historians "(the land of fragrance and beauty)", because this area have around the most important places, like the Indus River at the west and Kabul River at north which included the valleys of Peshawar, Swat, Dir and Bajaur, and Taxila Valley at the east in Punjab, and not only in Pakistan but extending westwards to Hadda and Bamiyan in Afghanistan. Therefore the region of Dir is filled with the remains of the Gandharan Civilization.

== See also ==
- List of museums in Pakistan
