= National Museum of Science and Technology (Pakistan) =

Science and Technology Museum in Lahore, Pakistan

Coordinates: 31.5767°N 74.3533°E

The National Museum of Science and Technology (NMST or NMSTPK) is a national museum located in Lahore, Pakistan.

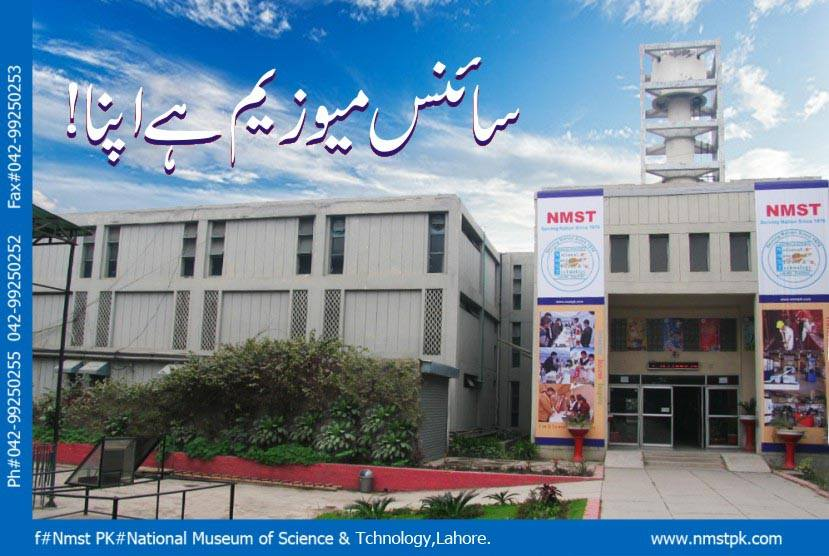

== History ==
The National Museum of Science and Technology was founded in 1965. Initially, it was meant only for the University of Engineering & Technology students. In 1976 it was opened to the public.

The exhibits and galleries went through four phases of expansion. The museum became an attached department of the Science and Education Department, Punjab, in the wake of the 18th amendment to the Constitution of Pakistan in 2011.

In 2011, this museum in Lahore had nearly 100,000 visitors.

== Description ==
The National Museum of Science and Technology is Pakistan's only national-level science and technology museum. It is a non-profit, permanent institution in the service of society, open to the public, which exhibits the tangible and intangible heritage of humanity and its environment for the purpose of educating the public.

This Science & Technology museum is situated on G.T. Road, near the University of Engineering & Technology, Lahore (UET).

== Competitions ==
Competitions are arranged at the museum for the students, including annual essay competitions, science quizzes, and science innovation competitions.

== See also ==
- List of museums in Pakistan
