= Hund, Khyber Pakhtunkhwa =

Village in District Swabi, Khyber Pakhtunkhwa, Pakistan

Hund ہنڈ (Urdu) هنډ (Pashto)
- Village
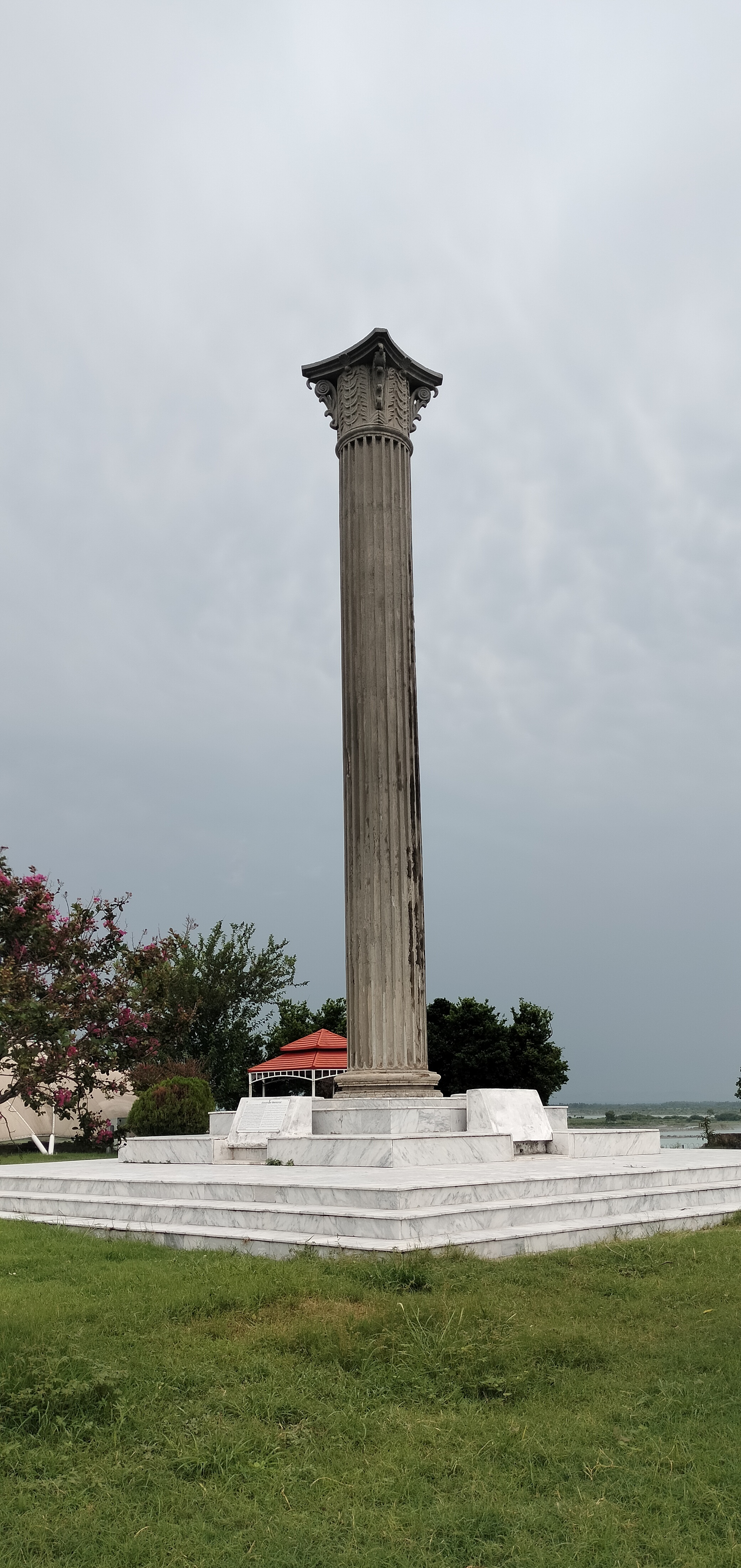
- The Alexander the Great Memorial
- Etymology: Possibly from Sanskrit "Udabhandapura" meaning "city of water pots" or "high village"
- Nickname: (پاریس صوابی)
- Interactive map of Hund
- Location of Hund in Pakistan
- Coordinates (Right bank of the Indus River): 34.0173521°N 72.4312554°E
- Country: Pakistan
- Province: Khyber Pakhtunkhwa
- District: Swabi District
- Tehsil: Lahor Tehsil
- Established: Ancient (pre-4th century BC)
- Historical Significance: Capital of Turk Shahi and Hindu Shahi dynasties
- Founder: Unknown (ancient origins)
- Union council: Khunda

Government
  - Type: Local government
  - Body: Swabi District Administration
  - Nazim: Israr Khan

Area
  - Total: 28.09 km^{2} (10.85 sq mi)
- Total area includes agricultural and residential land
- Elevation: 340 m (1,120 ft)

Population (2023 census)
  - Total: 13,897
  - Density: 494.7/km^{2} (1,281/sq mi)
- Pathan population
- Demonym: Hundian
- Time zone: UTC+5 (PST)
- Postal code: 23560
- Languages: Pashto, Hindko,
- Historical rulers: Achaemenid Empire (6th–4th century BC); Alexander the Great (327–323 BC); Maurya Empire (321–185 BC); Greco-Bactrian Kingdom & Indo-Greek Kingdom (185 BC–c. 50 AD); Kushan Empire (1st–3rd century AD); Kidarites (4th century AD); Hephthalites (5th–6th century AD); Turk Shahi Dynasty (7th–9th century AD); Hindu Shahi Dynasty (9th–11th century AD); Ghaznavid Empire (11th–12th century AD); Ghurid dynasty (12th century); Delhi Sultanate (1206–1526 AD); Mughal Empire (1526–18th century AD); Durrani Empire (1747–19th century CE); British Raj (1849–1947); Pakistan (1947–present)
- Hund is home to the Hund Museum, preserving artifacts from Gandhara and Hindu Shahi periods.

Hund (Pashto: هنډ), known in antiquity as Udabhandapura, is a small village in Swabi district, situated on the right bank of the Indus River in the Khyber Pakhtunkhwa province of Pakistan. It is about 15 km upstream of Attock Fort and is located 80 km to the east of Peshawar.

It was the site of Alexander the Great's crossing of the Indus in 327 BC, and an important site of Gandhara ruins. It is also the site of Hund Museum.

== History ==
It was Turk Shahi capital of Gandhara, which possibly functioned as a winter capital alternating with the summer capital of Kabul, within their kingdom of Kapisa-Gandhara in the 7-9th century AD.

Hund was also the last capital of Gandhara, following Charsadda (then Pushkalavati) and Peshawar (then known as Purushapura), under the Hindu Shahi rulers until the beginning of 11th century AD, when Mahmud of Ghazni defeated Anandapala, the last Hindu Shahi ruler in Gandhara. The Hindu Shahi capital was then shifted to Nandana in the Salt Range, Punjab. It has also been said that the Mongol invader Genghis Khan also followed Khwarezm Shah up to Hund, before the prince jumped into the Indus River on his way to India.

In the early nineteenth century, Hund was held by a family of Khans whose chief, Khadi Khan, was an early supporter of the reformist leader Sayyid Ahmad Barelvi and was killed in 1829. His brother, Amir Khan, was recorded as chief of Hund at the time of the Punjab's annexation by the British in 1849, and was succeeded by his son Shahdad Khan, who received a government allowance from the new administration. A separate nineteenth-century administrative source describes the family as Sadozai Pathans of the Balar Khel section who had come into the region with the Yusufzai migration from Kandahar and founded the village.

Shahdad Khan consolidated the family's landholding at the regular settlement of Peshawar District, conducted between 1869 and 1875, and was murdered in 1875 while praying in the village mosque, in the aftermath of disputes arising from that consolidation.

His son and successor, Azad Khan, was penalised by the district administration under the Frontier Crimes Regulation in 1887, following an attempt to have a village revenue official (patwari) killed in retaliation for testimony given against him in a civil suit; he was stripped of his cash allowance and revenue-free land grant for five years and removed from his seat in the local darbar.

Family Tree of Khans of Hund

- Khadi Khan
- Mahomed Amir Khan
  - Shahdad Khan (d. 1875)
    - Akbar Khan
    - Azad Khan
      - Sher Mahomed Khan (b. 1876)
      - Hasham Khan (b. 1882)
      - Ghulam Haidar Khan (b. 1884)
      - Muhammad Yaqoob Khan
      - Muhammad Ayub Khan (b. 1894)

== Geography ==
The village Hund is surrounded by a fort, remains of which are still visible. There were four gates of the walled city which are visible till to date and were used as entry and exit points. It is said that of the walled city a deep trench was also dug to control un authorized entry. The trench was crossed by a movable wooden bridge which used to be lifted at night by the guards of the gates and Garrison closed at night. According to some historians there was a tunnel inside the walled city which connected Hund Garrison with Attock Fort so that both Garrisons can reinforce each other in case of attack and used the tunnel as a withdrawal route in case a Garrison fell into enemy hands.

Old relics and remains of ancient civilizations have been found in the village after excavation work was undertaken by the government in recent past. The history and past glory of the Hund has been preserved by the govt by constructing a museum in the village on the bank of river Indus. A replica of tower of Olympia has also been constructed watching the mighty Indus in the memory of Alexander the Great who crossed river Indus and stayed in Hund during his last military campaign of the Indian subcontinent.

== Settlements ==
Before the partition of India, the village had a mixture of Hindu and Muslim population. Remains of Hindu worship places and their residences were visible till near the past, however some are now nearly non-existent after increase in population. After the partition, most of the non-Muslims left for India. Soon the village was mainly inhibited by Pathans who later on invited artisans from other clans and casts to settle down in the village so as to make it an independent entity. The settlements of Balar Khel are mainly in villages Zaida, Maini, Yaqubi, Yar Hussain, Hund, Ambar, Lahor, Kaddi and Panj Pir in Swabi District of Khyber Pakhtunkhwa in Pakistan. Hund also had the unique honour to be the capital of a Hindu Maharaja and a military garrison of Akbar. According to historians, Hund is one the oldest surviving cities in the world.

== Gallery ==
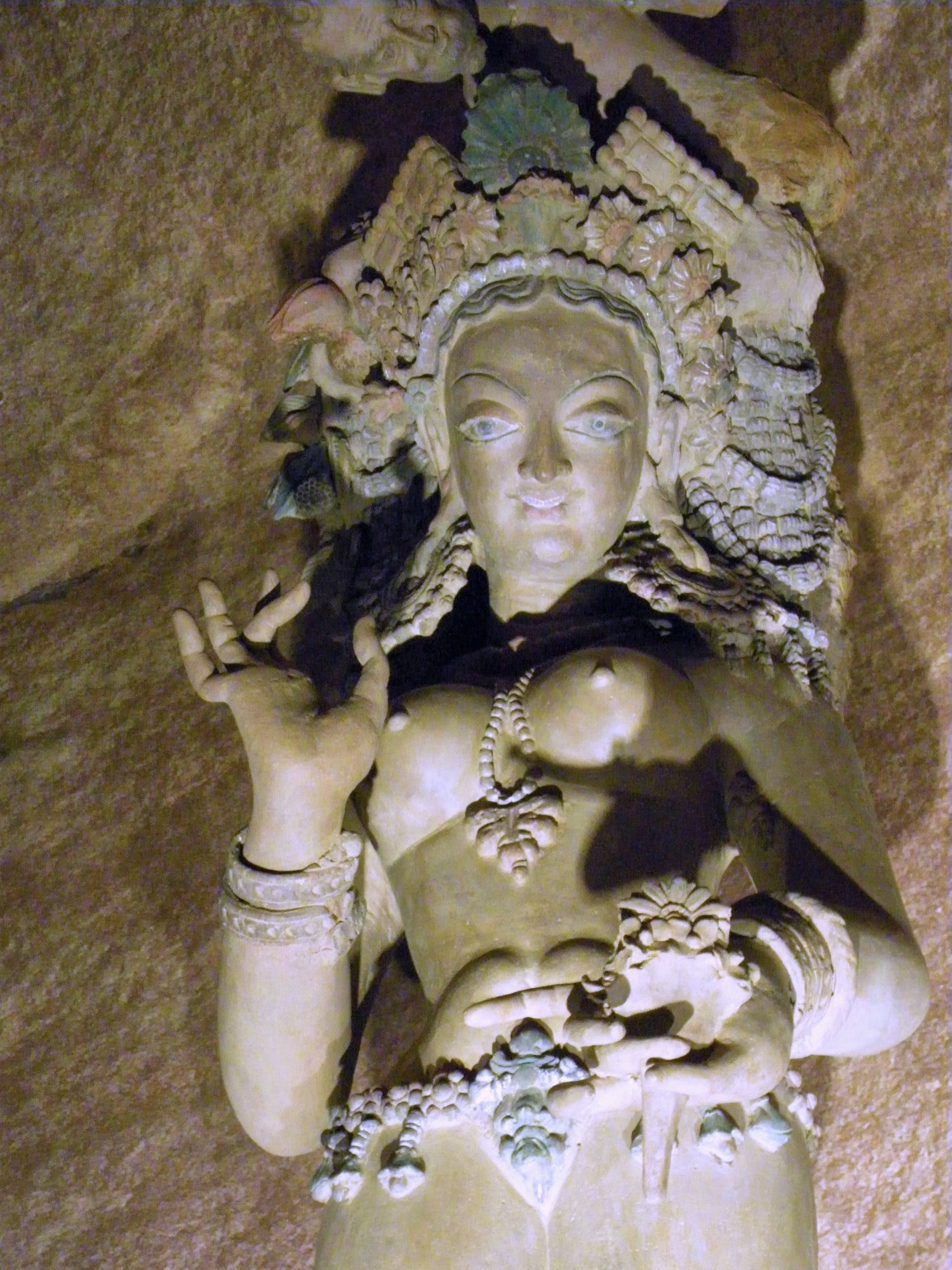
Buddhist Devata statue from Hund, 6-7th century AD. Museum of Oriental Art (Turin)

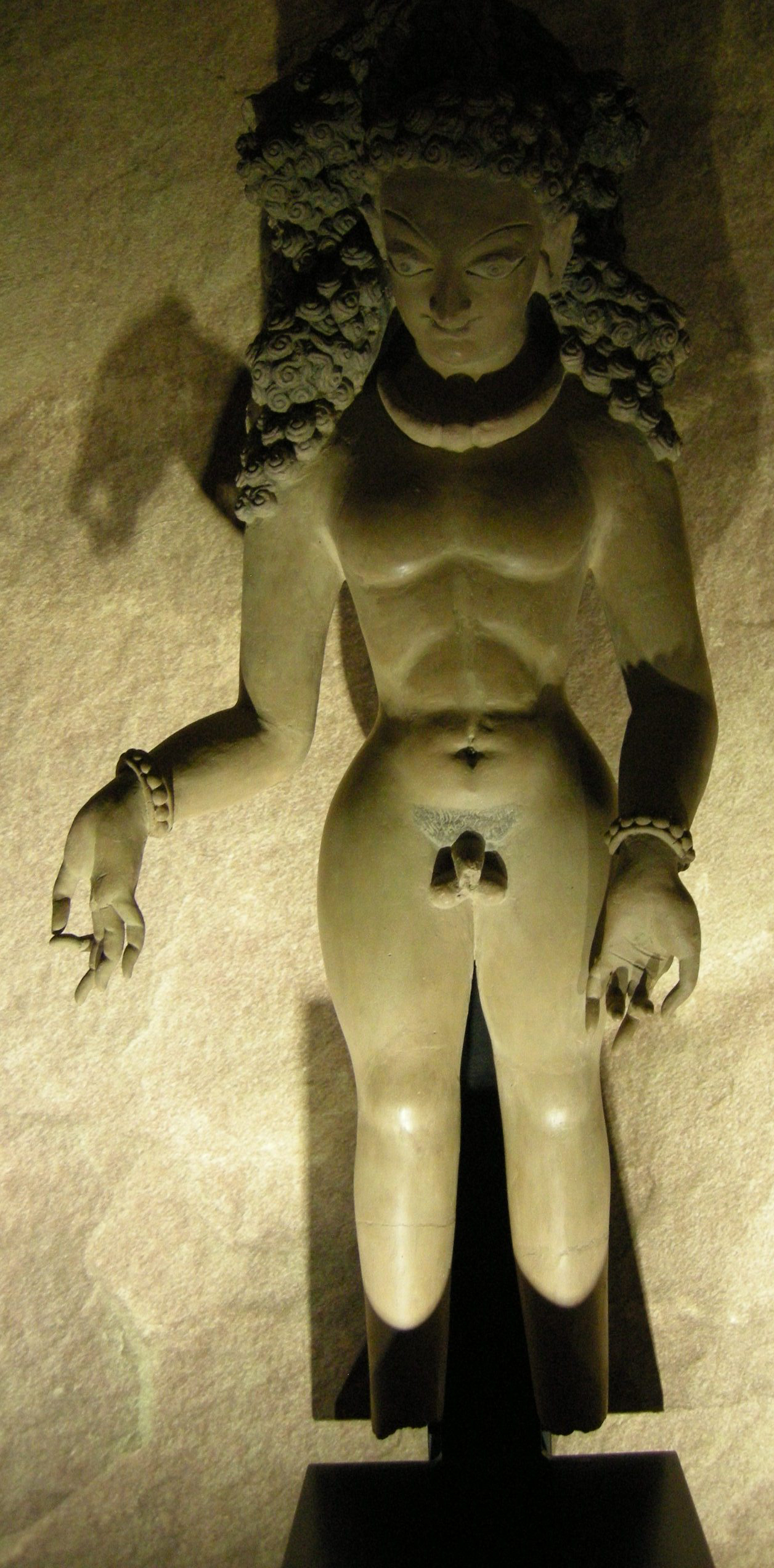
Buddhist Devata, 6-7th century AD, Hund. Museum of Oriental Art (Turin)

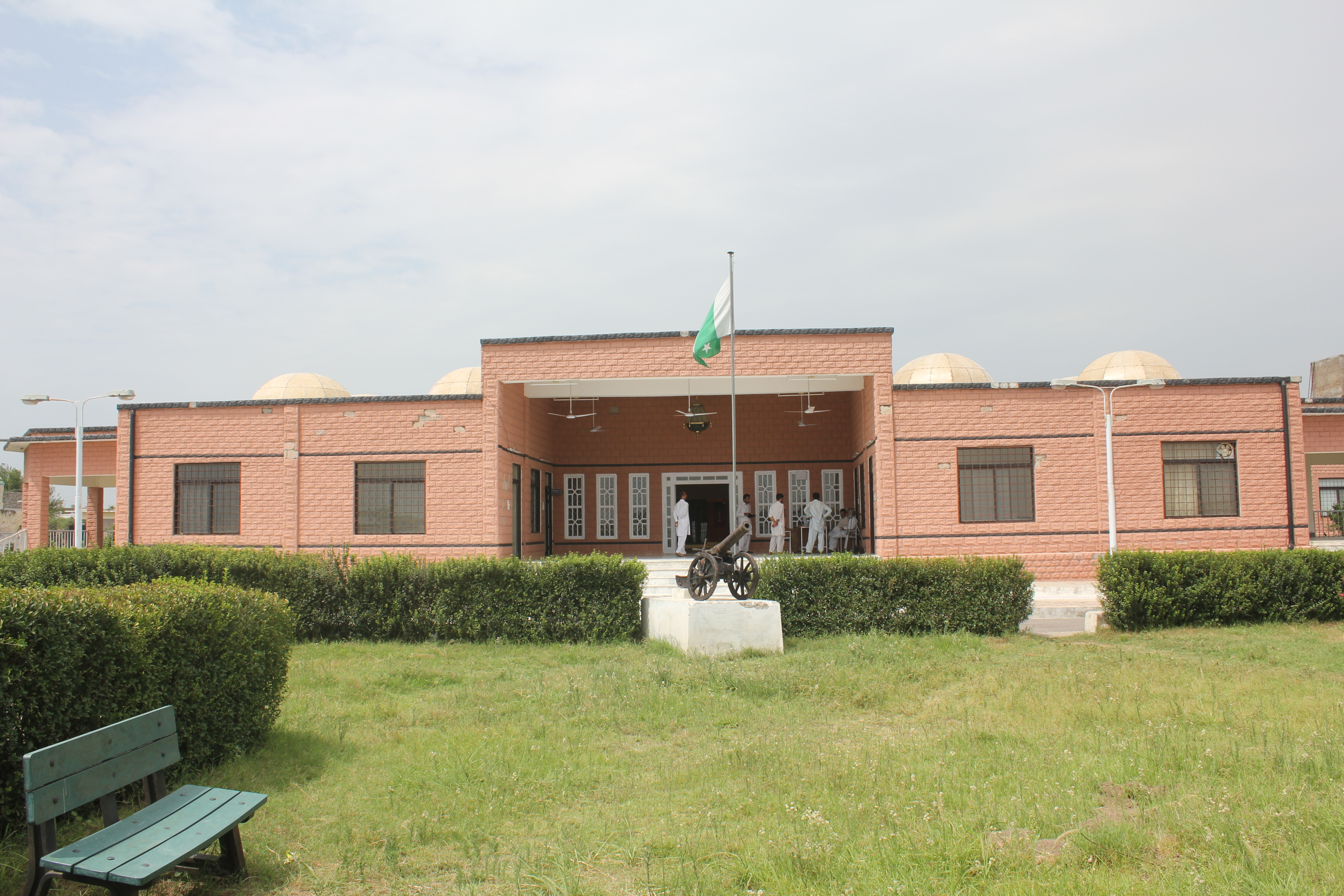
Hund Museum

== See also ==
- Hund Museum
- Takht Bhai
