= Lyallpur Museum =

History museum in Faisalabad, Pakistan

- Punjabi: عجائب گھر فيصل آباد
- Established: 30 July 2011
- Location: Opposite Zila Council; University Road; Faisalabad, Punjab, Pakistan
- Coordinates: 31°25′18″N 73°05′01″E
- Type: Regional history museum about Sandalbar
- Collection size: 7000+
- Visitors: 60,000
- Curator: Zahid Iqbal
- Website: Official website

Lyallpur Museum, located in Faisalabad, originally known as Lyallpur until 1977, is a heritage museum dedicated to preserving the city's history and culture. The government-established museum features 10 galleries that highlight the region's ancient and modern history.

== History ==
It was established in 2011 by then Chief Minister Punjab, Mian Mohammad Shahbaz Sharif, following a proposal from Aamer Sarfraz. It has a Board of Governors now headed by the Commissioner, Faisalabad Division.

== Galleries ==
The ten galleries are:

- Orientation Gallery
- Sandal Bar Gallery
- Regional Heritage Archaeological Gallery
- Muslim to Sikh Period Gallery
- Chenab Colony Gallery
- Lyallpur Gallery
- Thought and Act Gallery
- Social Beauty Gallery
- Textile Gallery
- Pakistan Movement Gallery

== Location ==
Lyallpur Museum is located on University Road in front of Faisalabad District Council and close to District courts. Car access is from either Katchehry Bazaar or the University of Agriculture (Faisalabad) Main Campus. The public transport system also provides access to Lyallpur Museum.

== See also ==
- List of museums in Pakistan
