= Department of Archaeology =

Department of Arch(a)eology or Arch(a)eology Department may refer to:

== Government departments ==
- AJK Tourism and Archeology Department, Azad Jammu and Kashmir, Pakistan
- Department of Archaeology (Bangladesh)
- Department of Archaeology (Nepal)
- Department of Archaeology (Sri Lanka)
- Karnataka State Department of Archaeology, India
- Kerala State Archaeology Department, India
- Tamil Nadu Archaeology Department, India
- Washington State Department of Archaeology and Historic Preservation, United States

== Academic departments ==
- University of Liverpool Department of Archaeology, Classics and Egyptology, England
- Department of Archaeology at the University of York, England
