= Pakistan Army Museum =

Military museum in Pakistan

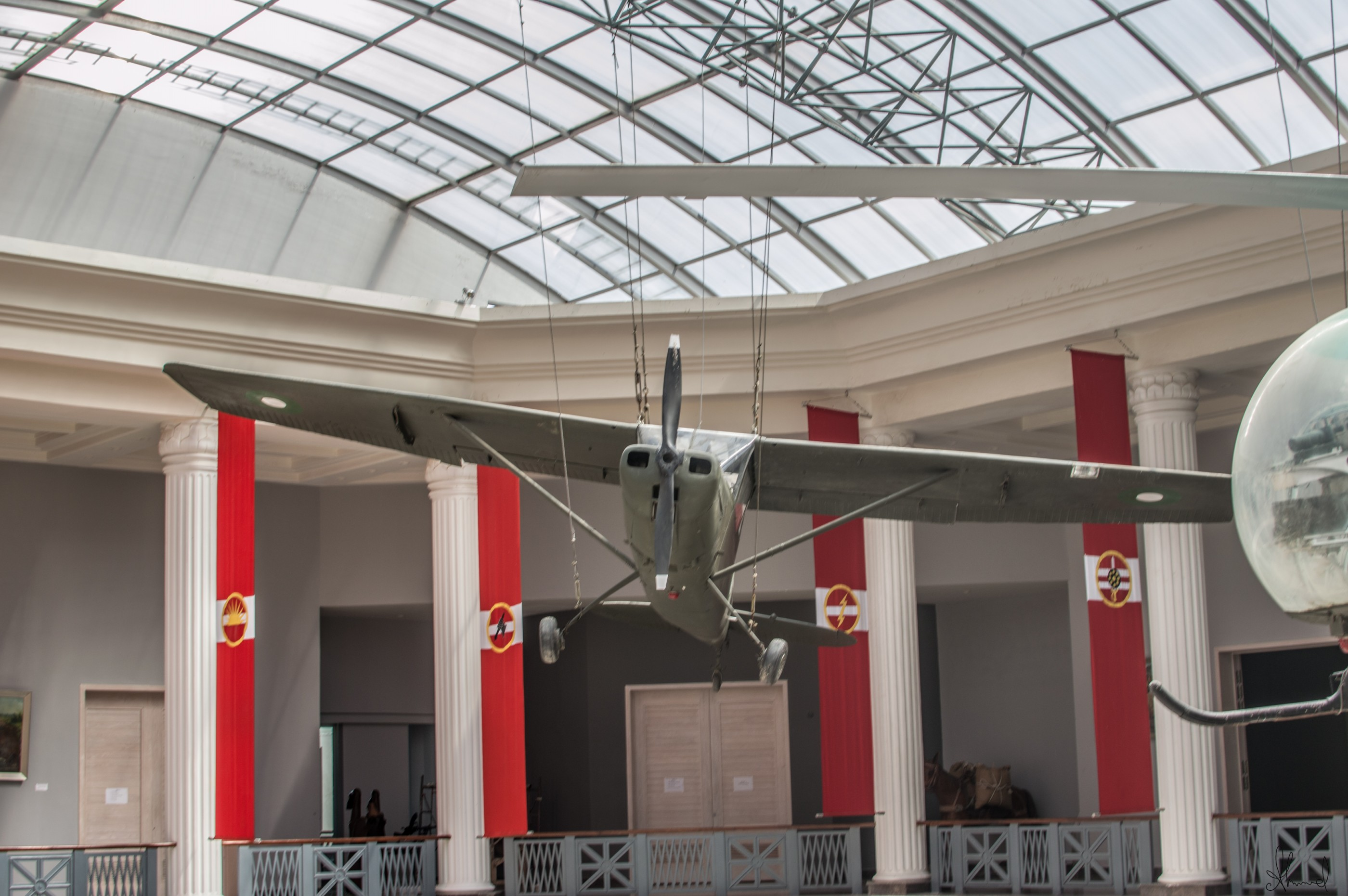
- A hanging L-19 inside the museum
- Established: October 24, 1961
- Location: Rawalpindi Cantonment, Rawalpindi, Punjab, Pakistan
- Coordinates: 33.5867°N 73.0542°E
- Type: Military
- Collection size: Military equipment, captured and retired tanks and helicopters, paintings.
- Website: pakarmymuseumrwp.com

Pakistan Army Museum is a military museum located in Rawalpindi. It was opened on October 24, 1961 to preserve Pakistan Army's past through relics and pictures and is one of the largest museums of Pakistan.

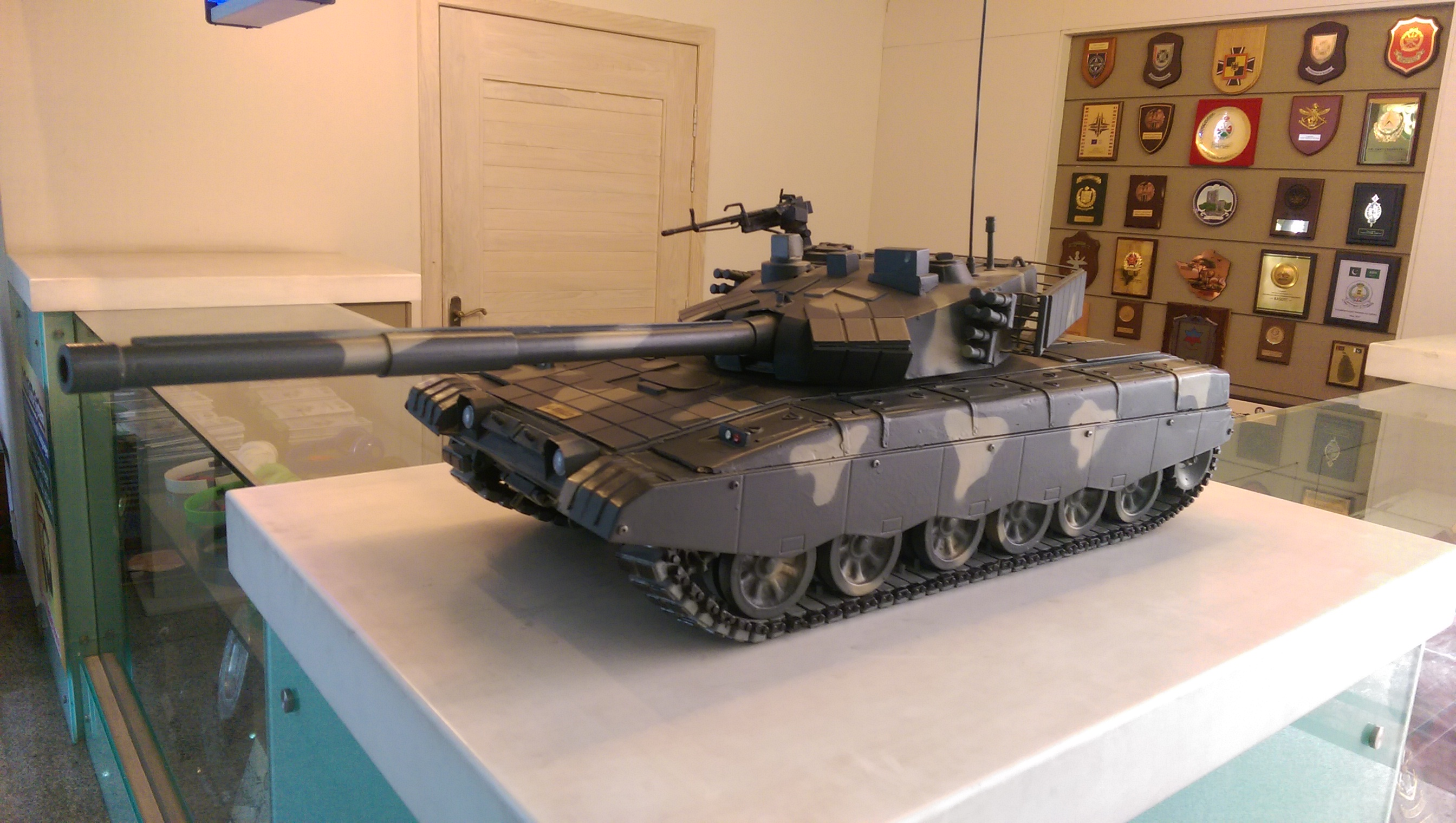
Al khalid Tank scale model

== Location and contents ==
The museum also contains rare pieces of old-time arms and uniforms to depict transformation of military forces. Some of the surviving Sherman tanks are a part of the museum's display. Pakistan Army Museum is located in the British-era colonial barracks of the Pakistan Army's General Headquarters (GHQ) complex of buildings. It is a must-see for weaponry and war history enthusiasts. This museum displays arms and ammunition from the Mughal Era and all the way up to modern weapons. Detailed history of the evolution of the Pakistan Army is offered in the new museum building.

== List of Galleries ==
- Gallery 1 – Kashmir War
- Gallery 2 – Indo Pakistan War 1965
- Gallery 3 – Indo Pak War 1971 / Lipa / Siachin / Kargil Ops
- Gallery 4 – Nishan-i-Haider
- Gallery 5 – War on Terror
- Gallery 6 – Service to Humanity
- Gallery 7 – Evolution of Small Arms
- Gallery 8 – Musical instruments and Uniforms of bandsman
- Gallery 9 – Frontier Force, Punjab & Baloch Regiments
- Gallery 10 – Northern Light Infantry, Mujahid, Sindh and Azad Kashmir regiments
- Gallery 11 – Armoured Corps, Regiment of Artillery, Army Air Defence, Army Strategic Forces Command
- Gallery 12 – Army Services Corps, Army Medical Corps, Corps of Electrical & Mechanical Engineers, Ordnance Corps and Remount & Veterinary Corps

== Global war on terrorism ==
A special gallery has been dedicated to the global war on terrorism and the Pakistan military's anti-terrorism operations in the tribal areas on Pakistan-Afghanistan border.

== See also ==
- List of museums in Pakistan
