= Pakistan Air Force Museum =

Museum in Karachi, Pakistan

- پاک فضائیہ عجائب گھر
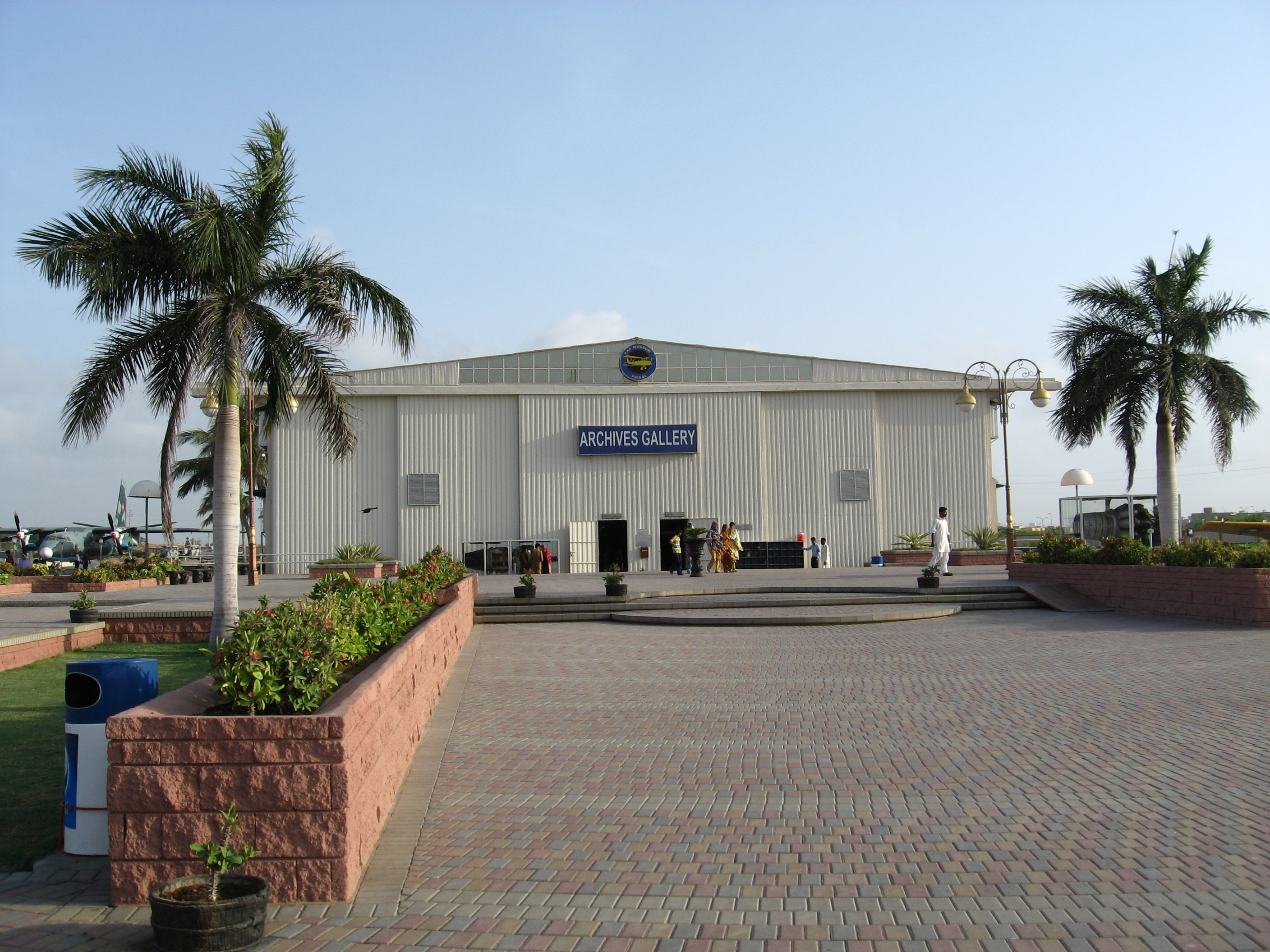
- Main Entrance
- Location: Karachi, Sindh, Pakistan
- Coordinates: 24.8720°N 67.0974°E
- Type: Military museum
- Collections: Military equipment, captured and retired aircraft, paintings.
- Owner: Pakistan Air Force
- Website: pafmuseum.com.pk

Pakistan Air Force Museum Faisal (Urdu: پاک فضائیہ عجائب گھر) is the main museum of the Pakistan Air Force located on the south-western edge of PAF Base Faisal near Karsaz Flyover on Shahrah-e-Faisal at Karachi.

The museum is the only military aviation museum in Pakistan, with more than 50 aircraft, radars and missiles on display. The museum draws thousands of visitors each day making it one of the most frequently visited tourist attractions in Karachi.

== History ==
The Museum dates back to the time of colonial rule when two hangars were erected by the British in the remote part of PAF Base Drigh Road which through the years were abandoned. In the years that followed, then Base commander of Faisal Airbase (Abbas Khattak) suggested an idea of establishing a museum to preserve the history of the air force. The museum was established in 1990 under the supervision of Air Commodore (retd) Usman Ghani who renovated the old hangar and developed the barren area. Between 1999 and 2004, the museum was expanded significantly. Additions included children's playing areas, rides, and eateries.

== Exhibits and collections ==
A majority of the aircraft, weapons and radar are displayed outside in the park but the main museum features all major fighter aircraft that have been used by the Pakistan Air Force. The museum also houses the Vickers VC.1 Viking aircraft used by Mohammed Ali Jinnah, founder of Pakistan, and a Folland Gnat of the Indian Air Force, that landed in Pasrur town in the Indo-Pakistani war of 1965. Also on display are the scale models of some World War I, World War II and some more modern aircraft and photo galleries of almost all the squadrons of Pakistan Air Force.

Some of the aircraft that are preserved in the museum are:

- Martin B-57 Canberra
- De Havilland Tiger Moth
- North American Harvard
- Lockheed F-104 Starfighter
- North American F-86 Sabre
- Dassault Mirage 5
- Shenyang F-6
- Lockheed T-33
- Mikoyan-Gurevich MiG-15
- Aerospatiale Alouette III
- Auster Autocar
- Antonov An-26
- Antonov An-12
- A-26 Invader
- U-9 Aero Commander
- Vickers Viking
- Folland Gnat
- Kaman HH-43 Huskie
- [A statue of Indian Airforce's Wing Commander Abhinandan Varthaman along with the parts of the fuselage and tail of his Mig-21 aircraft are also on display in a gallery named Operation Swift Retort.

== Gallery ==
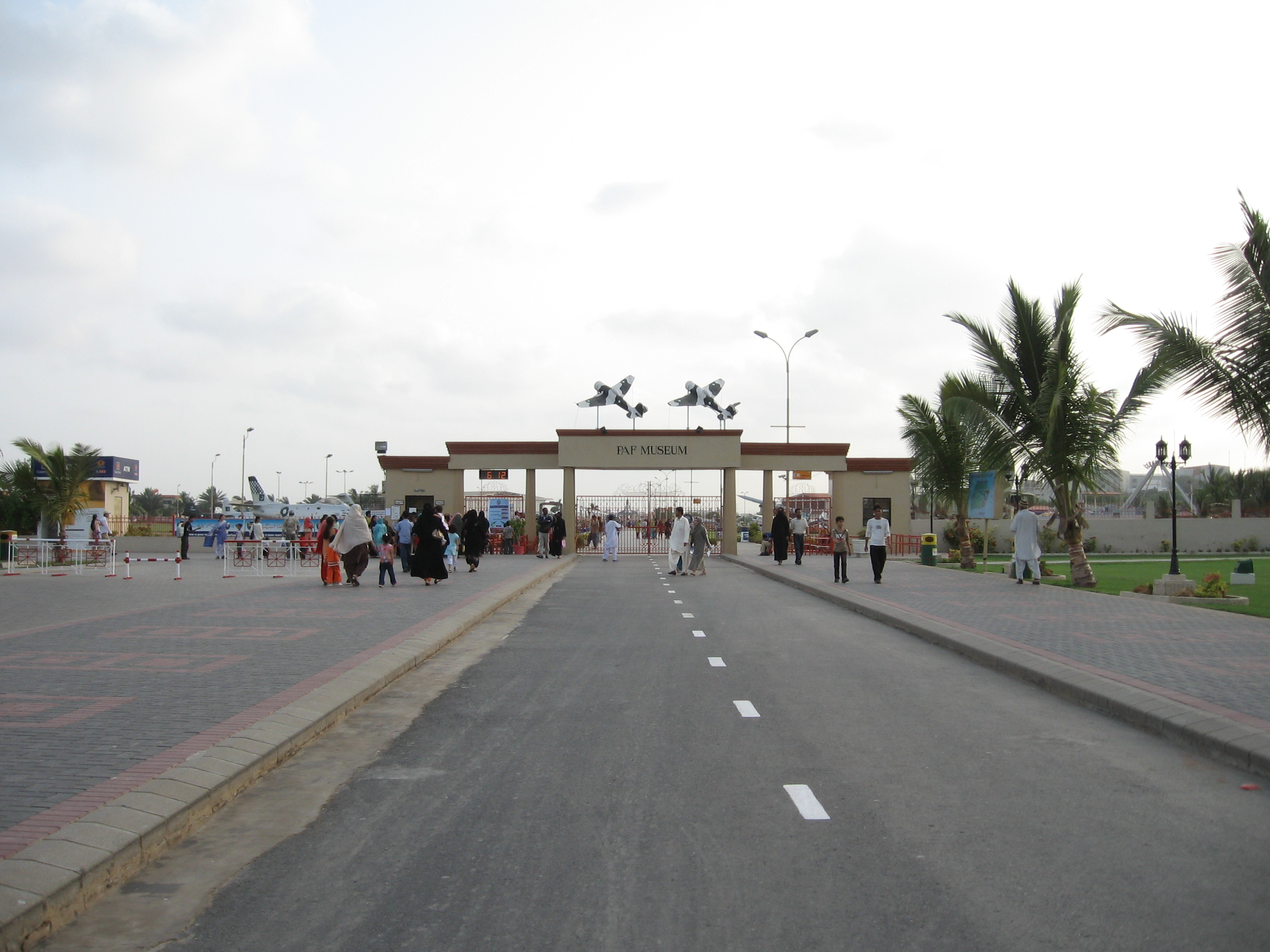
Main Gate

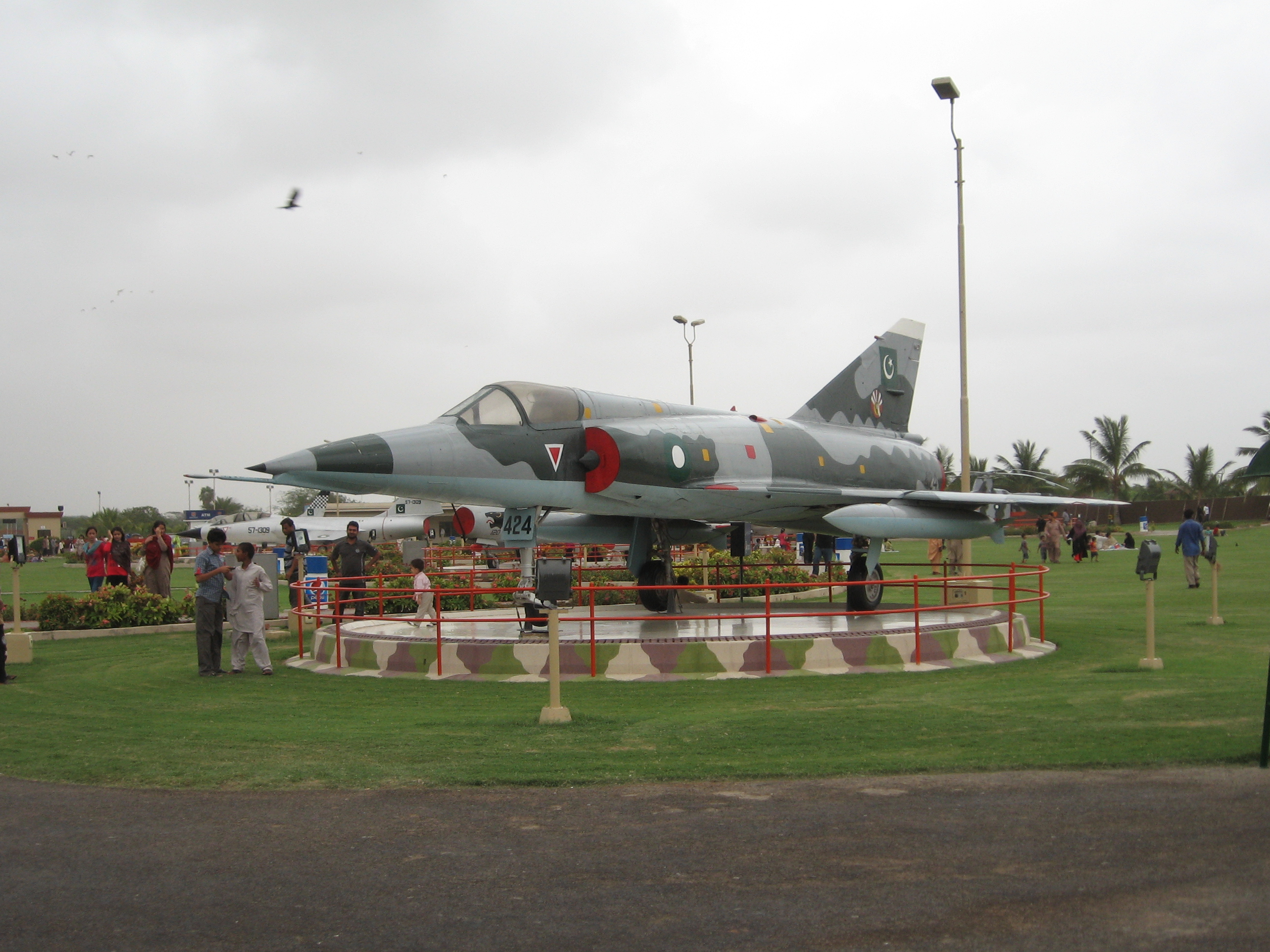
Mirage III Aircraft

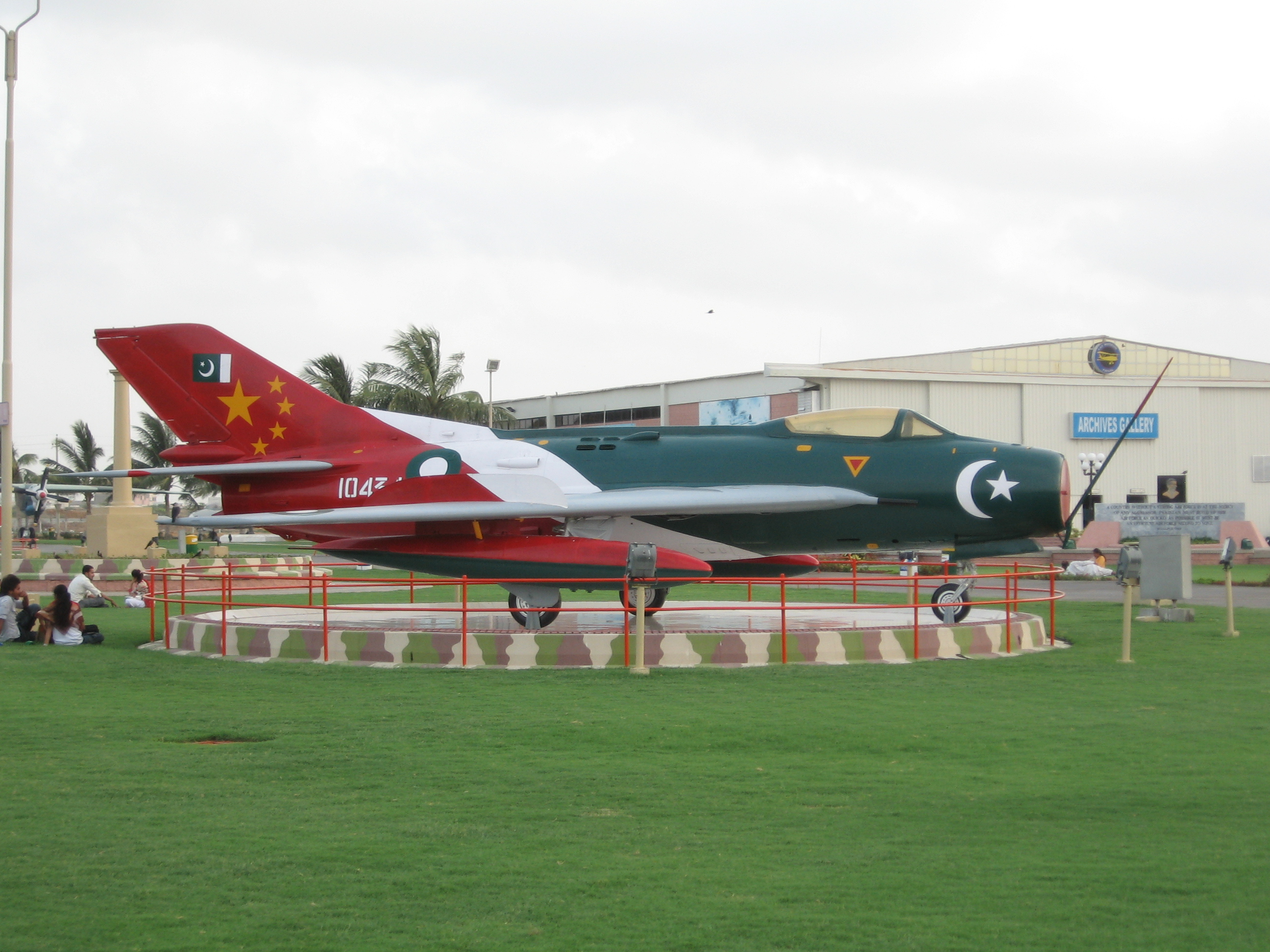
F-6 Aircraft

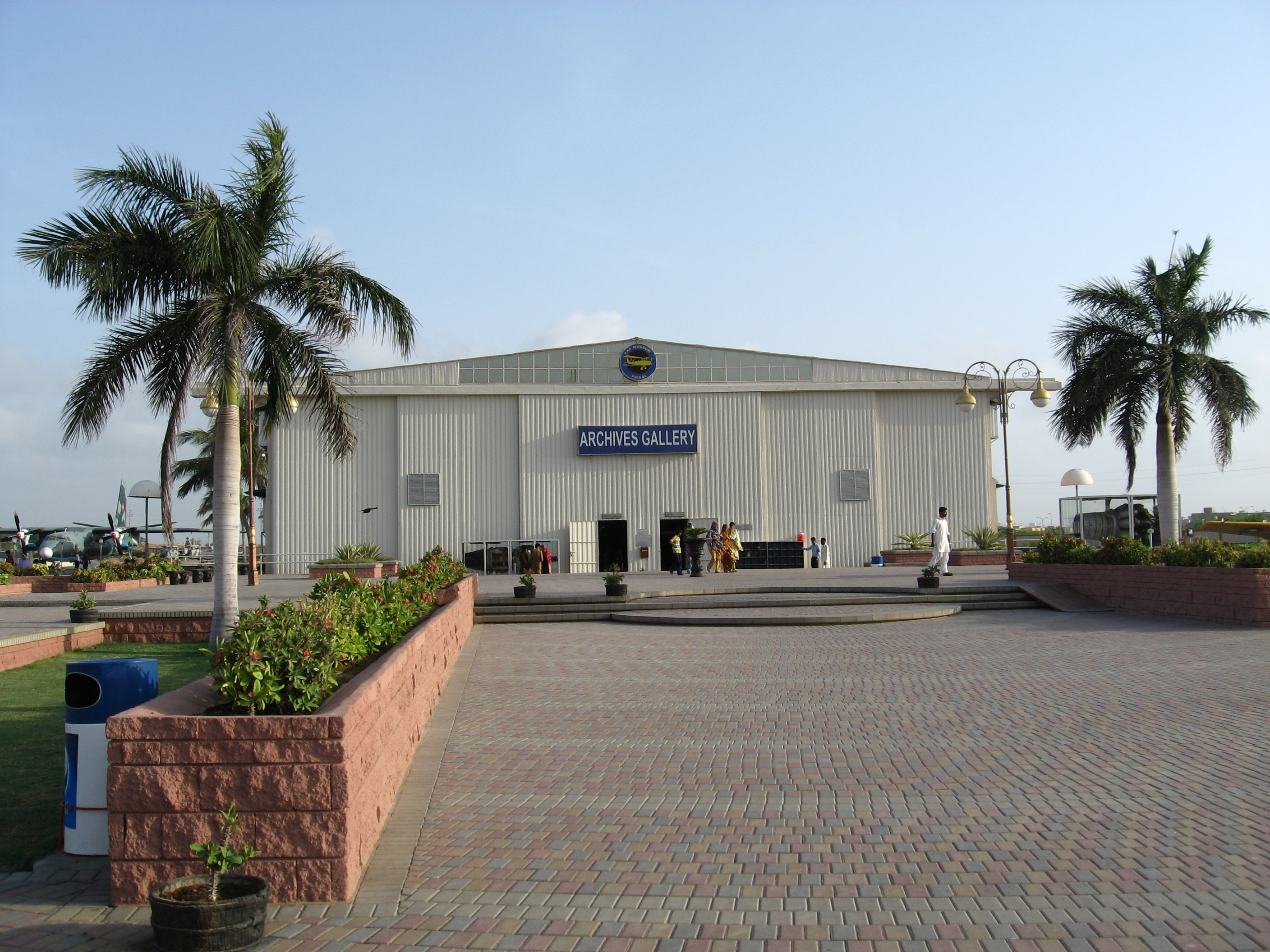
Archives Gallery

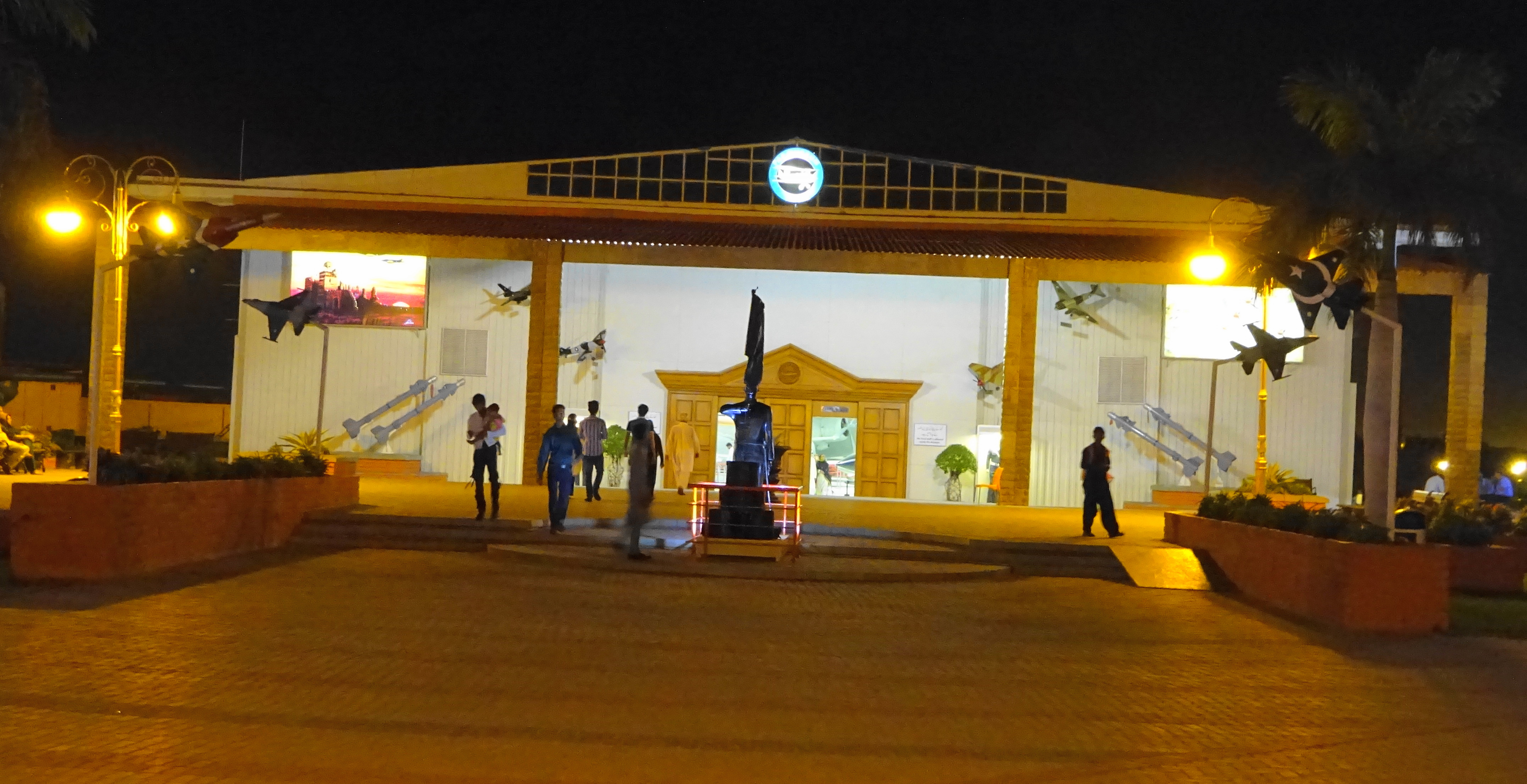
Museum Hall at night

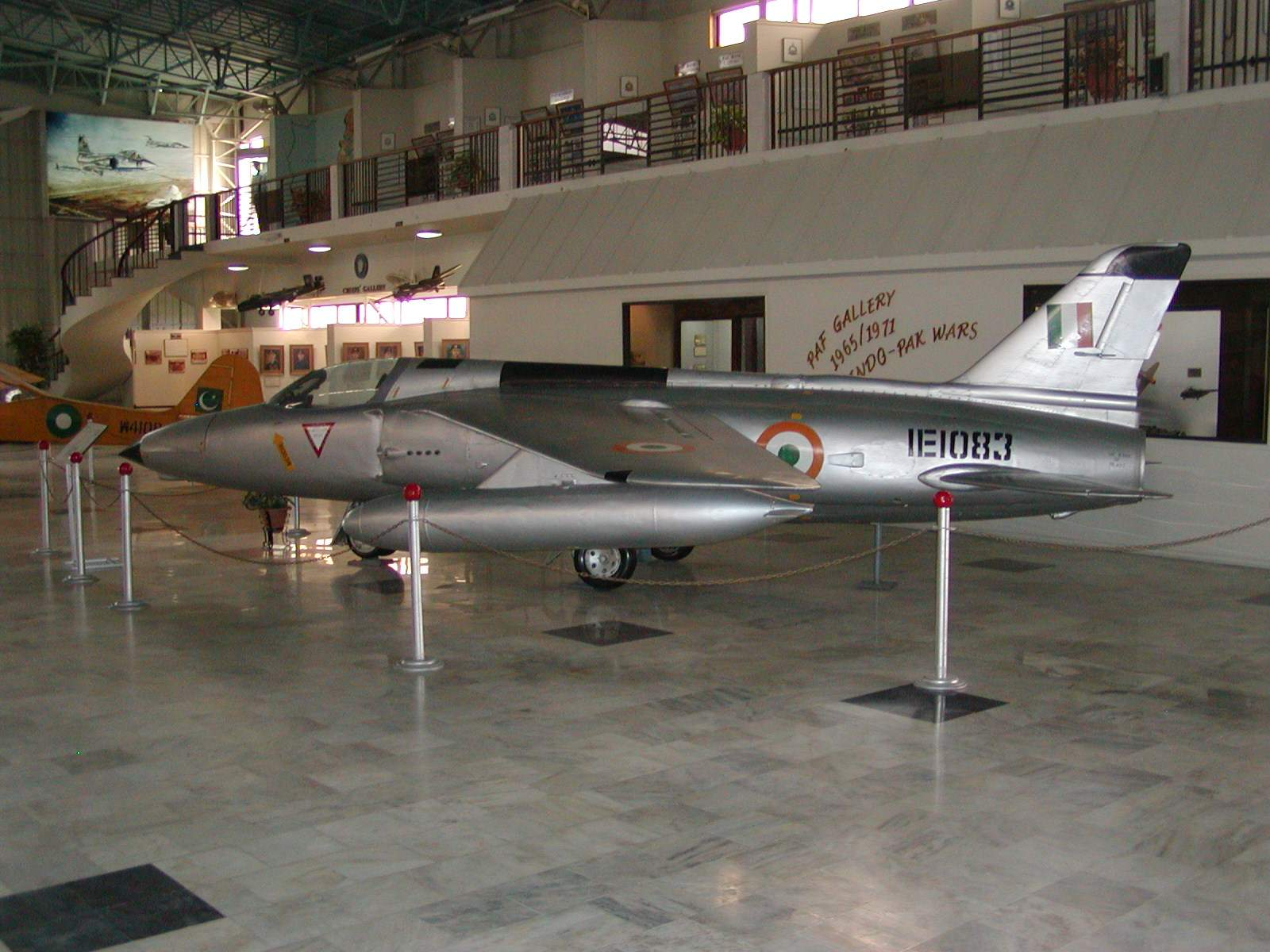
Captured Indian Folland Gnat from 1965 war on display at the PAF Museum Gallery.

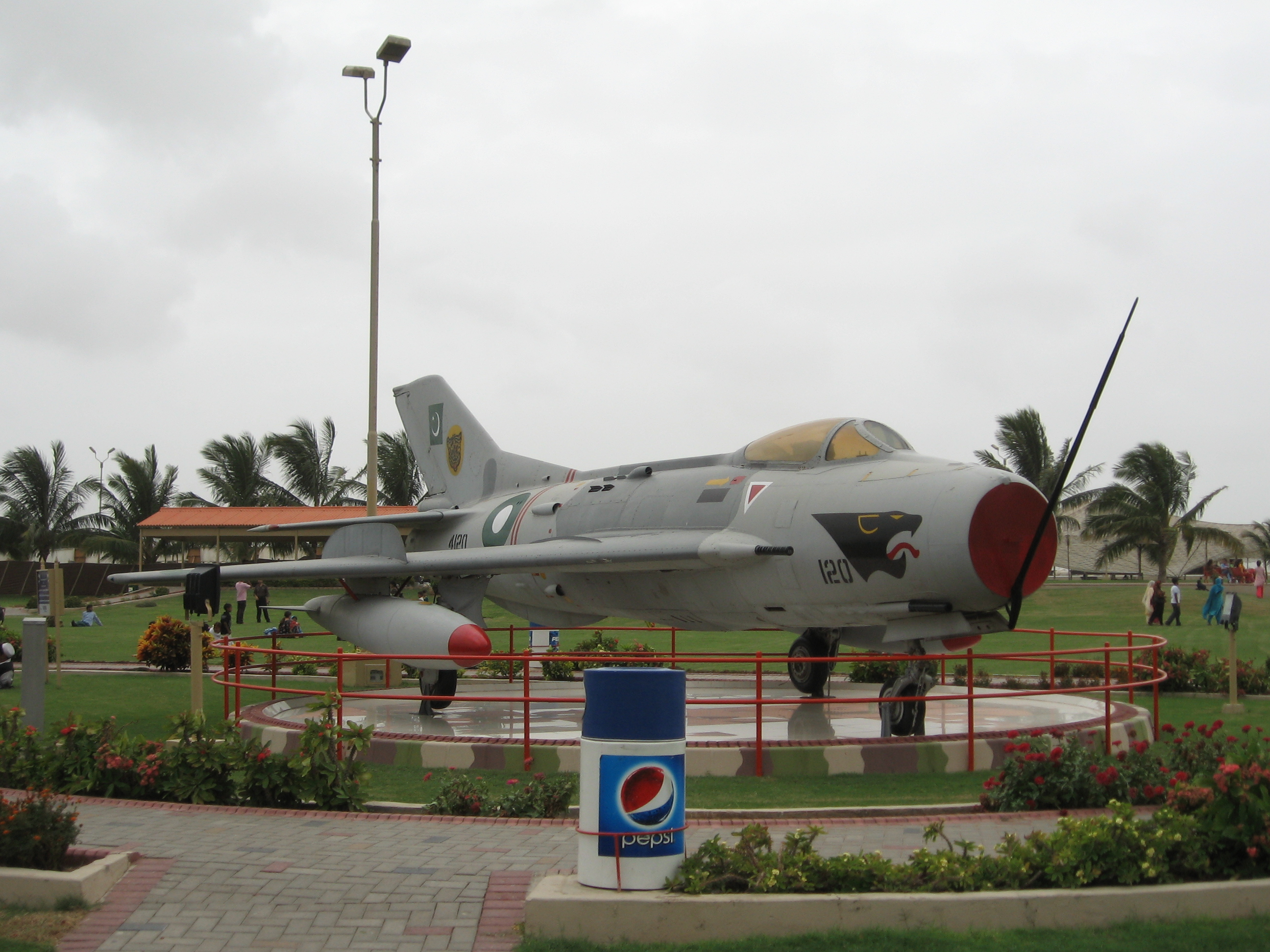
Shenyang F-6 Aircraft

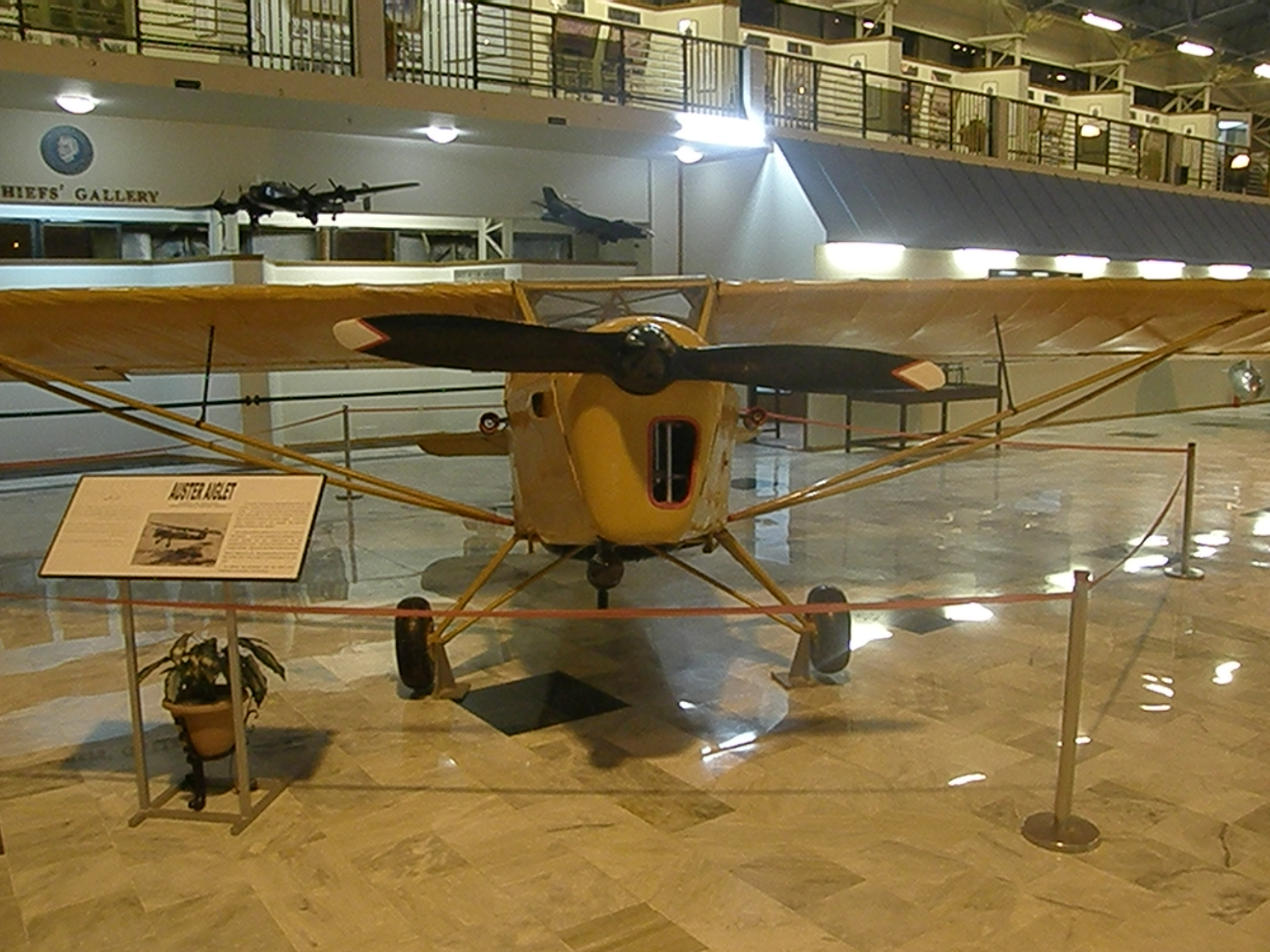
Auster Aiglet retired from the PAF on display at the PAF Museum, Karachi.

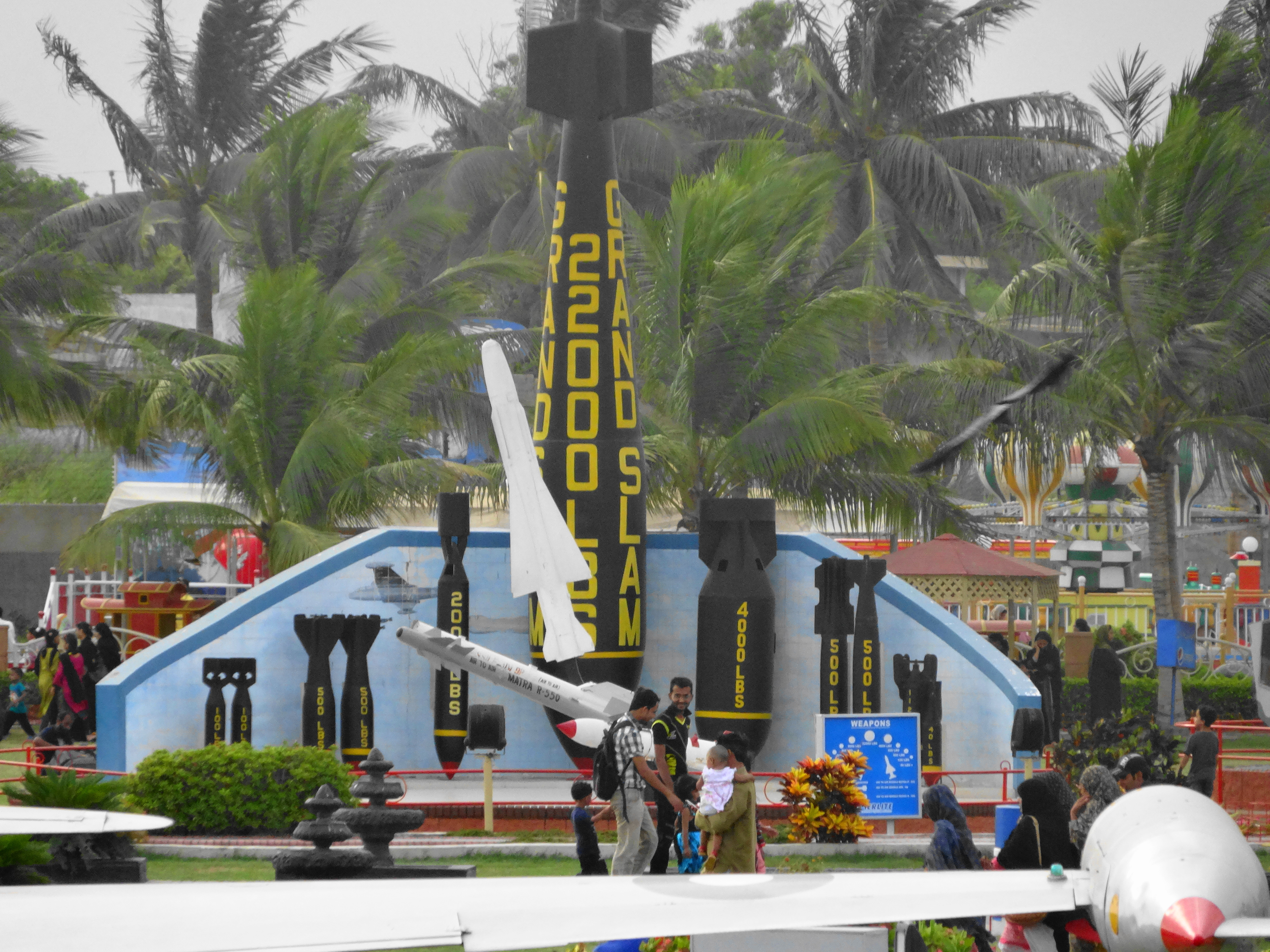

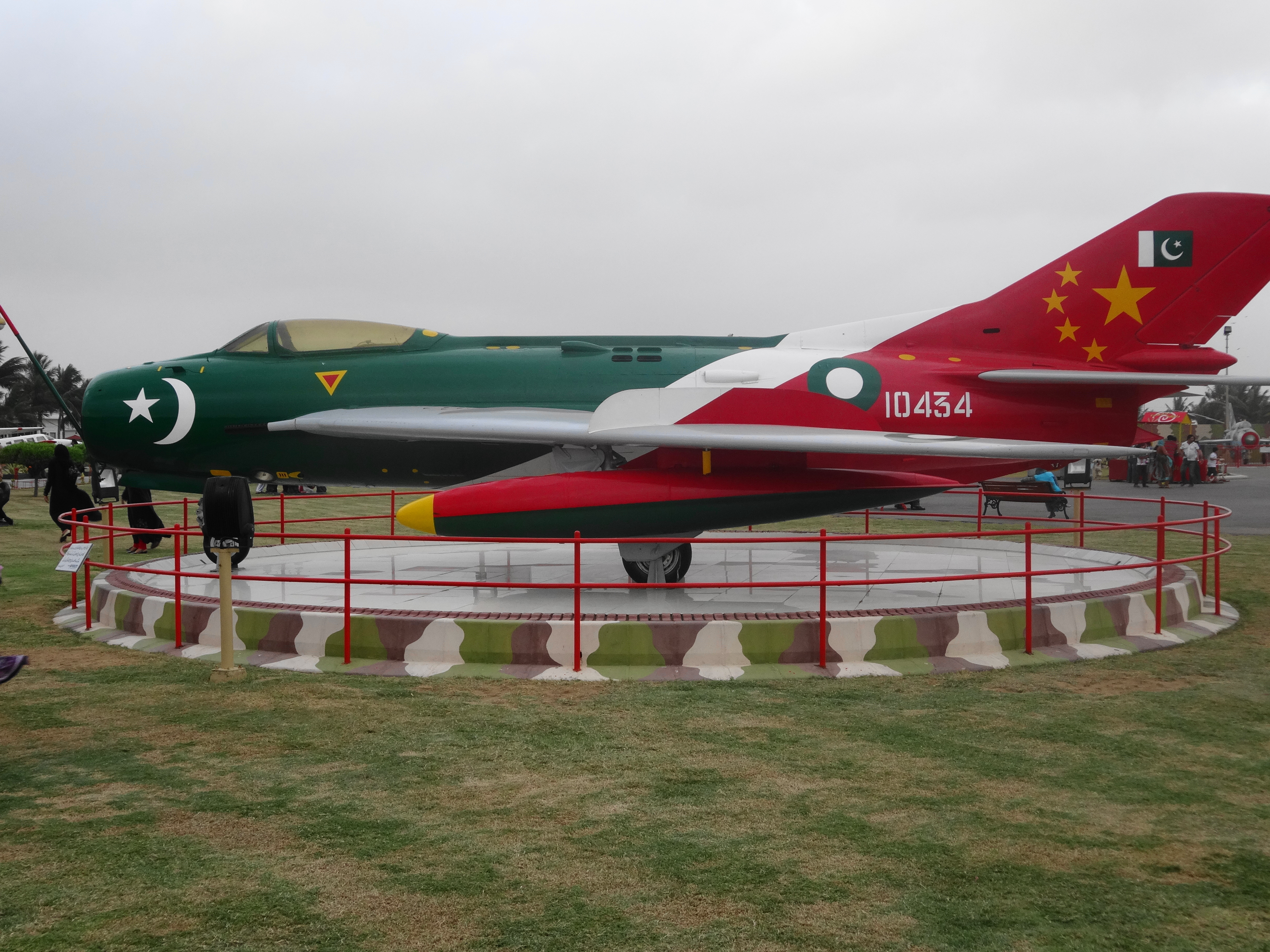
Fighter plane At PAF Museum

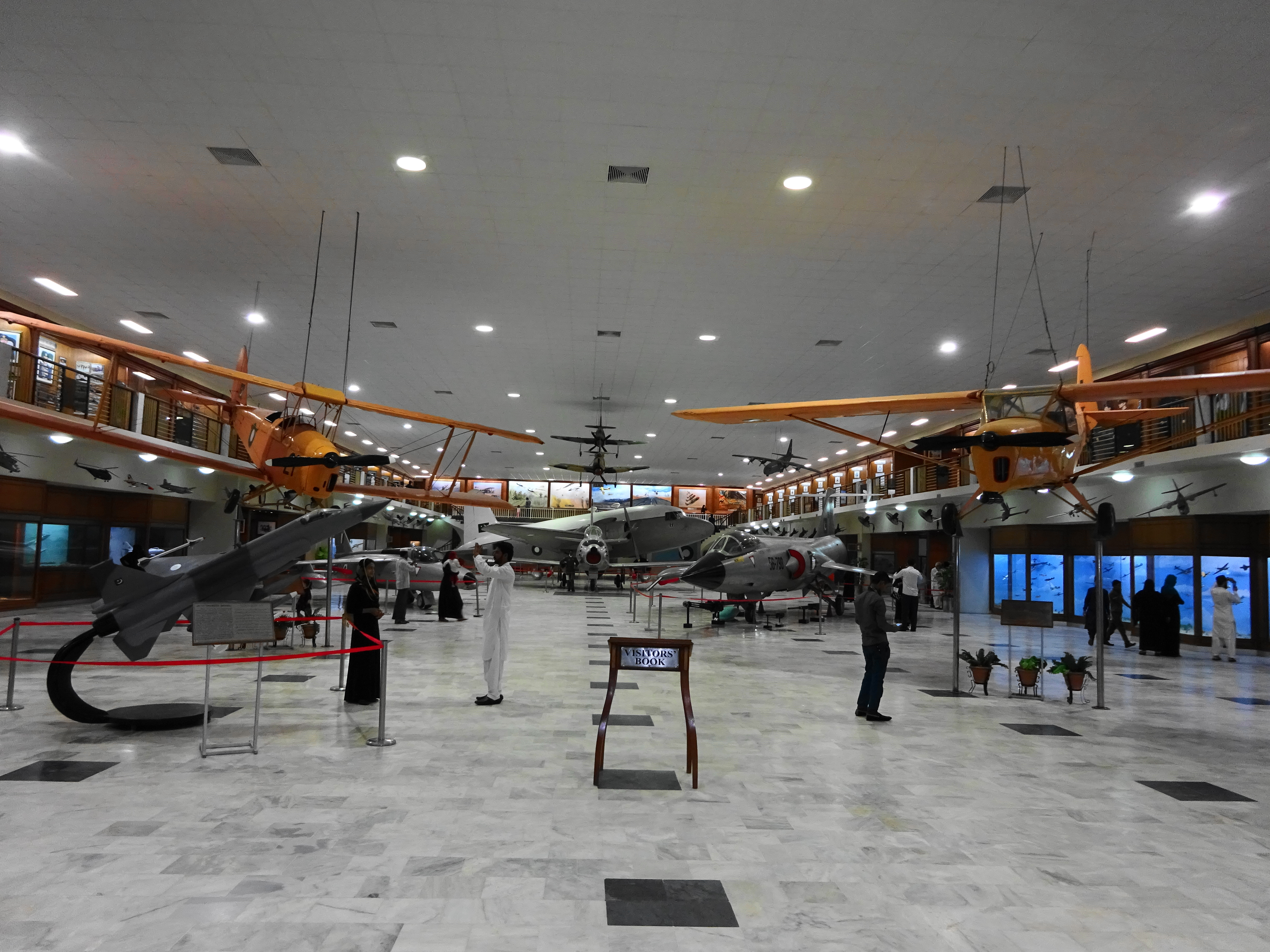
Museum Hall Inside View

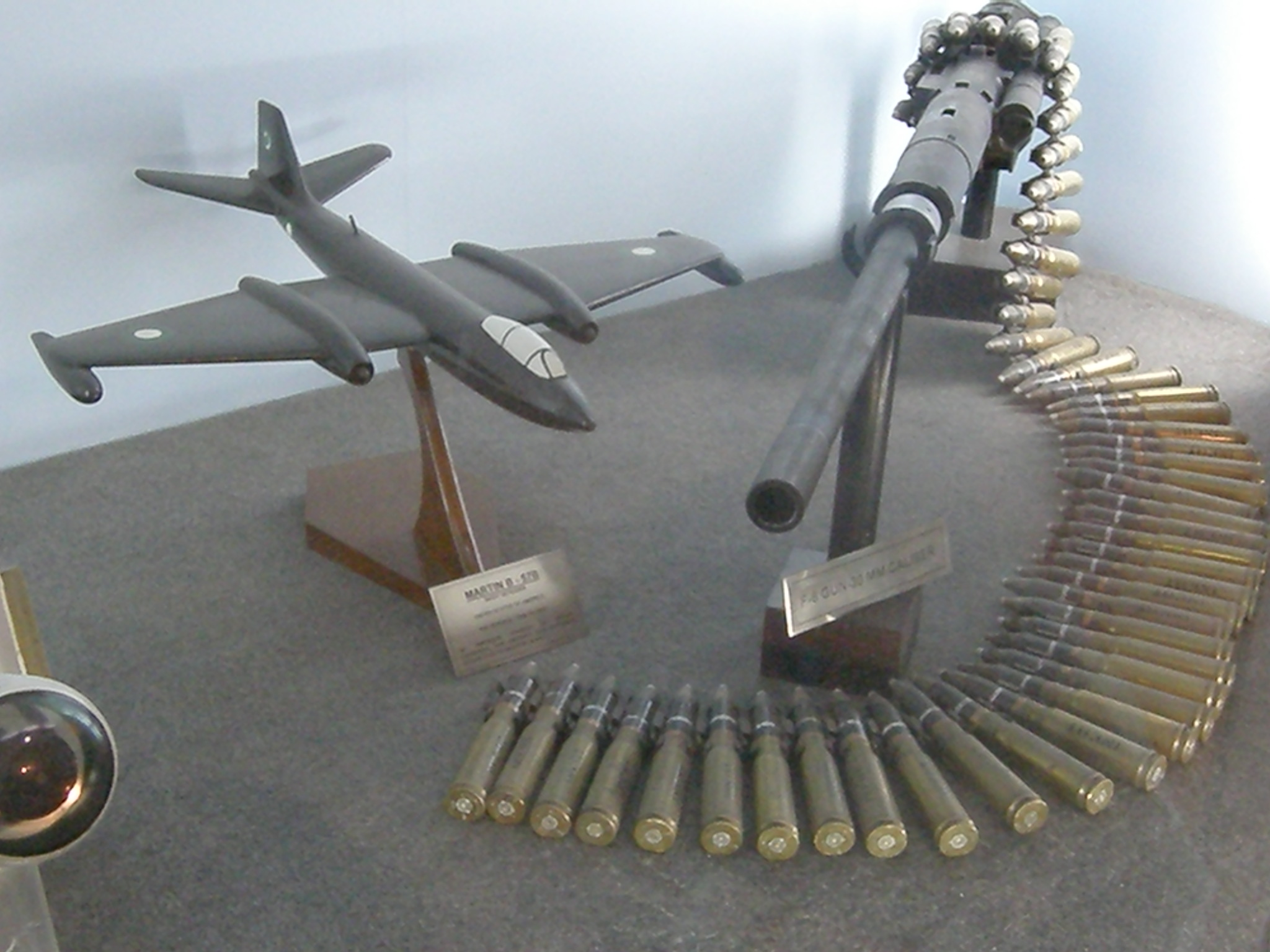
A model of the Martin B-57 bomber and the 30 mm cannon installed on the Shenyang F-6, on display at the Pakistan Air Force (PAF) Museum, Karachi.

== See also ==
- List of museums in Pakistan
