= UNESCO Asia-Pacific Heritage Awards =

UNESCO Asia-Pacific Heritage Awards, also known as the UNESCO Asia-Pacific Awards for Cultural Heritage Conservation, is a regional flagship programme of UNESCO since 2000, in recognition of the achievement made by the private sector and public-private initiatives in conserving or restoring cultural heritage sites in the Asia-Pacific region.

The objective is to motivate the protection of cultural heritage sites initiated by the private sector or through public-private collaboration.

== Award categories ==
The Awards now consist of six categories.

Name	Previous name	Since	Remarks
Award of Excellence	Most Excellent Project (only in 2000)	2000	Vacunt in 2014
Award of Distinction	Excellent Project (only in 2000)	2000	/
Award of Merit	Outstanding Project (only in 2000)	2000	/
Honourable Mention	/	2000	Removed after 2019
Award for New Design in Heritage Contexts	Heritage Awards Jury Commendation for Innovation	2005	/
Special Recognition for Sustainable Development	/	2020	/

== Winners ==
Since the winning project for Special Recognition for Sustainable Development are sometimes also the winner of another award, projects may repeat. To ease identification, those winning projects matching the above description will be marked with #.

Year	Award	Project name	Location	Country
2000	Most Excellent Project	Cheong Fatt Tze Mansion	Penang	Malaysia
2000	Excellent Project	Chanwar Palkhiwalon-ki-Haveli	Rajasthan	India
2000	Excellent Project	Hoi An Preservation Cooperation Project	Gwangnam Province	Vietnam
2000	Outstanding Project	Hotel de l'Orient	Pondicherry	India
2000	Outstanding Project	Hung Shing Old Temple	Hong Kong SAR	China
2000	Outstanding Project	Ohel Leah Synagogue	Hong Kong SAR	China
2000	Outstanding Project	Residence of Dr Zhang Yunpen	Zhenjiang City, Jiangsu Province	China
2000	Outstanding Project	St. Patrick's College	Sydney	Australia
2000	Honourable Mention	Harischandra Building	Anuradhapura	Sri Lanka
2000	Honourable Mention	Mawson's Huts Historic Site	Commonwealth Bay, Antarctica	
2000	Honourable Mention	Residence of Charles Prosper Wolff Schoemaker	Bandung, Jawa Barat	Indonesia
2000	Honourable Mention	Rumah Penghulu	Kuala Lumpur	Malaysia
2001	Award of Excellence	National Archives Building	Jakarta	Indonesia
2001	Award of Distinction	Bushell's Tea Warehouse	New South Wales	Australia
2001	Award of Distinction	Krishan Temple	Punjab	India
2001	Award of Merit	DBS House	Mumbai	India
2001	Award of Merit	King Law Ka Shuk Temple	Hong Kong SAR	China
2001	Award of Merit	Tea Factory Hotel	Nuwara Eliya	Sri Lanka
2001	Award of Merit	Xijin Ferry Area Project	Zhenjiang, Jiangsu	China
2001	Award of Merit	Zhongshan Road	Fujian	China
2001	Honourable Mention	Jin Lan Tea House	Yunnan Province	China
2001	Honourable Mention	University of Mumbai Library Building	Mumbai	India
2001	Honourable Mention	Neilson Tower	Metro Manila	Philippines
2001	Honourable Mention	St. Joseph's Seminary Church	Macao SAR	China
2001	Honourable Mention	Thian Hock Temple	158 Telok Ayer Street	Singapore
2002	Award of Excellence	Ahhichatragarh Fort	Rajasthan	India
2002	Award of Distinction	Australian Hall	Sydney	Australia
2002	Award of Distinction	Yarikutz, Rupikutz, Kuyokutz, Mamorukutz Mosques	Hunza	Pakistan
2002	Award of Merit	Cheng Hoon Teng Main Temple	Malacca	Malaysia
2002	Award of Merit	Convent of the Holy Infant Jesus	30 Victoria Street	Singapore
2002	Award of Merit	Polsheer House	Isfahan	Iran
2002	Award of Merit	Sydney Conservatorium of Music	Sydney	Australia
2002	Award of Merit	Wat Sratong	Khon Kaen	Thailand
2002	Honourable Mention	No. 125 Huajue Alley	Xi'an	China
2002	Honourable Mention	Broken Hill Heritage and Cultural Tourism Programme	New South Wales	Australia
2002	Honourable Mention	Centre for Khmer Studies	Siem Reap	Cambodia
2002	Honourable Mention	Jaisalmer Streetscape Revitalization Project	Rajasthan	India
2002	Honourable Mention	Kow Plains Homestead	Victoria	Australia
2003	Award of Excellence	Guang Yu Ancestral Hall	Conghua, Guangdong Province	China
2003	Award of Distinction	Water Towns of the Yangtze River	Jiangsu Province and Zhejiang Province	China
2003	Award of Distinction	Astana of Syed Mir Muhammad	Ghanche District, Baltistan	Pakistan
2003	Award of Merit	Cangqiao Historical Street	Shaoxing City, Zhejiang Province	China
2003	Award of Merit	The Medina Grand Adelaide Treasury	Adelaide	Australia
2003	Award of Merit	Virtuous Bridge	Medan	Indonesia
2003	Honourable Mention	Gota de Leche	Manila	Philippines
2003	Honourable Mention	Catholic Cathedral of the Immaculate Conception	Hong Kong SAR	China
2003	Honourable Mention	Dalongdong Baoan Temple	Taipei	China
2004	Award of Excellence	Baltit Fort	Karimabad village, Hunza region	Pakistan
2004	Award of Distinction	Lakhpat Gurudwara	Lakhpat village, Gujarat	India
2004	Award of Distinction	St. Ascension Cathedral	Almaty	Kazakhstan
2004	Award of Distinction	Church of Our Lady of Mount Carmel	Mullewa	Australia
2004	Award of Merit	Dadabhai Naoroji Road Heritage Streetscape Project	Mumbai	India
2004	Award of Merit	Dorje Chenmo Temple	Shey Village, Ladakh	India
2004	Award of Merit	Phra Racha Wang Derm	Bangkok	Thailand
2004	Award of Merit	St. Thomas Cathedral	Mumbai	India
2004	Award of Merit	Vietnamese Traditional Folkhouses	Bac Ninh, Quang Nam, Dong Nai, Nam Dinh, Thanh Hoa and Tien Giang Provinces	Vietnam
2004	Honourable Mention	Elphinstone College	Mumbai	India
2004	Honourable Mention	Female Orphan School	Sydney	Australia
2004	Honourable Mention	Gong Zi Ting	Beijing	China
2004	Honourable Mention	Namuna Ghar	Bhaktapur	Nepal
2004	Honourable Mention	Suzhou River Warehouse	Shanghai	China
2004	Honourable Mention	Tak Seng On Pawnshop Museum and Cultural Club	Macao SAR	China
2004	Honourable Mention	Zargar-e-Yazdi House	Yazd	Iran
2004	Honourable Mention	Zhangzhou City Historic Streets	Zhangzhou	China
2005	Award of Excellence	Houkeng Timber-Arched Corridor Bridge	Qingyuan County, Zhejiang Province	China
2005	Award of Excellence	Dr. Bhau Daji Lad Museum	Mumbai	India
2005	Award of Distinction	Sideng Market Square and Theatre (Shaxi Rehabilitation Project)	Yunnan Province	China
2005	Award of Distinction	Mehrangarh Fort	Rajasthan	India
2005	Award of Merit	St. Joseph's Chapel	Hong Kong SAR	China
2005	Award of Merit	Tung Wah Coffin Home	Hong Kong SAR	China
2005	Award of Merit	Amburiq Mosque	Skardu, Baltistan	Pakistan
2005	Award of Merit	Dutch Reformed Church	Galle	Sri Lanka
2005	Award of Merit	Ayuguthi Sattal	Lalitpur, Kathmandu	Nepal
2005	Honourable Mention	Pingjiang Historic Block	Suzhou, Jiangsu Province	China
2005	Honourable Mention	Zhaoxiang Huang Ancestral Hall	Foshan, Guangdong Province	China
2005	Honourable Mention	Zain-ad-din Karavansara	Yazd	Iran
2005	Honourable Mention	Far Eastern University	Manila	Philippines
2005	Honourable Mention	Tammak Yai of Devavesm Palace	Bangkok	Thailand
2005	Heritage Awards Jury Commendation for Innovation	Meridian Gate Exhibition Hall of the Palace Museum	Beijing	China
2005	Heritage Awards Jury Commendation for Innovation	Yuhu Primary School and Community Centre	Lijiang, Yunnan Province	China
2006	Award of Excellence	Shigar Fort Palace	Skardu, Northern Areas	Pakistan
2006	Award of Distinction	Bund 18	Shanghai	China
2006	Award of Distinction	Uch Monument Complex	Punjab	Pakistan
2006	Award of Merit	St. Andrew's Church	Hong Kong SAR	China
2006	Award of Merit	Sir JJ School of Art Building	Mumbai	India
2006	Award of Merit	Han Jiang Ancestral Temple	Penang	Malaysia
2006	Honourable Mention	Liu Ying Lung Study Hall	Hong Kong SAR	China
2006	Honourable Mention	Arakkal Kettu	Kerala	India
2006	Honourable Mention	Leh Old Town	Ladakh	India
2007	Award of Excellence	Maitreya Temples	Ladakh	India
2007	Award of Distinction	Convocation Hall	Mumbai	India
2007	Award of Distinction	Altit Settlement	Gilgit	Pakistan
2007	Award of Distinction	Galle Fort Hotel	Galle	Sri Lanka
2007	Award of Merit	Bonython Hall	Adelaide	Australia
2007	Award of Merit	Lijiang Ancient Town	Yunnan	China
2007	Award of Merit	Little Hong Kong	Hong Kong SAR	China
2007	Award of Merit	Astana of Syed Yahya	Skardu	Pakistan
2007	Honouorable Mention	Liu Family Civil Residence	Shanxi Province	China
2007	Honouorable Mention	Old St. Andrew's School	/	Singapore
2007	Heritage Awards Jury Commendation for Innovation	Whitfield Barracks	Hong Kong SAR	China
2008	Award of Excellence	Herat Old City	/	Afghanistan
2008	Award of Excellence	Stadium Merdeka	Kuala Lumpur	Malaysia
2008	Award of Distinction	National Pass	Blue Mountains, New South Wales	Australia
2008	Award of Distinction	Fujian Earth Building	Fujian Province	China
2008	Award of Distinction	Suffolk House	Penang	Malaysia
2008	Award of Merit	Vysial Street	Pondicherry	India
2008	Award of Merit	Shigar Historic Settlements and Bazaar Area	Northern Areas	Pakistan
2008	Award of Merit	Wat Pongsanuk	Lampang	Thailand
2008	Honouorable Mention	Béthanie	Hong Kong SAR	China
2008	Honouorable Mention	Archiepiscopal Palace	Goa	India
2008	Honouorable Mention	Craigie Burn Bungalow	Matheran	India
2008	Honouorable Mention	Bach 38	Rangitoto Island, Auckland	New Zealand
2008	Honouorable Mention	Amphawa Canal Community	Amphawa District, Samut Songkhram Province	Thailand
2008	Honouorable Mention	Crown Property Bureau Building	Chachoengsao Province	Thailand
2008	Heritage Awards Jury Commendation for Innovation	733 Mountbatten Road	/	Singapore
2009	Award of Excellence	Sangiin Dalai Monastery	South Gobi Aimaq	Mongolia
2009	Award of Distinction	M24 Midget Submarine Wreck	Sydney	Australia
2009	Award of Distinction	Ali Gohar House	Hunza	Pakistan
2009	Award of Distinction	Hanok Regeneration in Bukchon	Seoul	South Korea
2009	Award of Merit	Huai Hai Lu 796	Shanghai	China
2009	Award of Merit	YMCA Students Branch	Mumbai	India
2009	Award of Merit	Waterworks Building	Auckland	New Zealand
2009	Award of Merit	Samchuk Community and Old Market District	Suphanburi	Thailand
2009	Honouorable Mention	Academy of Visual Arts (Former Royal Air Force Officers' Mess)	Hong Kong Baptist University, Hong Kong SAR	China
2009	Honouorable Mention	Heritage Buildings in Cicheng Historic Town	Zhejiang Province	China
2009	Honouorable Mention	YWCA Lady Willingdon Hostel	Mumbai	India
2009	Honouorable Mention	Tang Family Chapel	Hoi An	Vietnam
2009	Heritage Awards Jury Commendation for Innovation	Maosi Ecological Demonstration Primary School	Gansu	China
2010	Award of Excellence	Hong San See Temple	/	Singapore
2010	Award of Distinction	Red Brick Warehouses	Yokohama	Japan
2010	Award of Distinction	Gulabpur Khanqah	Shigar, Skardu	Pakistan
2010	Award of Merit	Fulong Taoist Temple	Sichuan	China
2010	Award of Merit	Chowmahalla Palace	Hyderabad	India
2010	Award of Merit	Old Houses in the World Heritage Fort of Galle	/	Sri Lanka
2010	Honouorable Mention	Ballaarat Mechanics' Institute	Ballarat	Australia
2010	Honouorable Mention	North Xinjiao Street	Zhejiang	China
2010	Honouorable Mention	Chhatrapati Shivaji Maharaj Vastu Sangrahalaya (Prince of Wales Museum)	Mumbai	India
2011	Award of Excellence	Baojiatun Watermill	Guizhou Province	China
2011	Award of Excellence	Sumda Chun Gonpa	Leh	India
2011	Award of Distinction	Altit Fort	Hunza	Pakistan
2011	Award of Merit	Serkhang Monastery	Qinghai Province	China
2011	Award of Merit	Scriptures Hall of Wat Thepthidaram Worawihan	Bangkok	Thailand
2011	Honouorable Mention	SCAD Hong Kong (Former North Kowloon Magistracy Building)	Hong Kong SAR	China
2011	Honouorable Mention	Na Phra Lan Historic Shophouses	Bangkok	Thailand
2011	Honouorable Mention	Salarian Pavilion of Wat Kutao	Songkhla	Thailand
2011	Heritage Awards Jury Commendation for Innovation	Sydney Harbour YHA and the Big Dig Archaeology Education Centre	New South Wales	Australia
2011	Heritage Awards Jury Commendation for Innovation	Ma'anqiao Village	Sichuan Province	China
2012	Award of Excellence	Mbaru Niang, Wae Rebo Village, Flores Island	East Nusa Tenggara	Indonesia
2012	Award of Distinction	Historic Water System of Hampi	Hampi, Karnataka	India
2012	Award of Distinction	Sethna Buildings	Mumbai	India
2012	Award of Merit	Chandramauleshwar Temple	Hampi	India
2012	Award of Merit	Khilingrong Mosque	Gilgit-Baltistan	Pakistan
2012	Award of Merit	Zhizhusi Complex	Beijing	China
2012	Honouorable Mention	Hal Raj Ji Mahal	Rajasthan	India
2012	Honouorable Mention	William Street Precinct	Perth, Western Australia	Australia
2012	Award for New Design in Heritage Contexts	Reading Room for the Portuguese School of Macau	Macao SAR	China
2013	Award of Excellence	Phra Borommathat Maha Chedi and Pharin Pariyattithammasala of Wat Prayurawongsawas	Bangkok	Thailand
2013	Award of Distinction	The Great Serai	Kabul	Afghanistan
2013	Award of Distinction	Lal Chimney Compound	Mumbai	India
2013	Award of Distinction	Khaplu Palace	Baltistan	Pakistan
2013	Award of Merit	Maryborough Railway Station	Victoria	Australia
2013	Award of Merit	Enjoying Snow Yard	Beijing	China
2013	Award of Merit	Tai O Heritage Hotel	Hong Kong SAR	China
2013	Award of Merit	Royal Bombay Yacht Club Residential Chambers	Mumbai	India
2013	Award of Merit	Otaki Town Hall	Chiba Prefecture	Japan
2013	Award of Merit	Historic Buildings in Duong Lam Village	Son Tay, Hanoi	Vietnam
2013	Honouorable Mention	Sail Maker's Shed	Broome, Western Australia	Australia
2013	Honouorable Mention	Lost Bomb Shelter of The Sofitel Legend Metropole Hanoi	Hanoi	Vietnam
2014	Award of Excellence	/		
2014	Award of Distinction	Saryazd Citadel	Yazd	Iran
2014	Award of Merit	Exeter Farm	Glenwood, New South Wales	Australia
2014	Award of Merit	Shri Sakhargad Niwasini Devi Temple Complex	Kinhai Village, Maharashtra	India
2014	Award of Merit	Frankton Boatshed	Queenstown	New Zealand
2014	Award of Merit	Wak Hai Cheng Bio	/	Singapore
2014	Award of Merit	Phraya Si Thammathirat Residence	Bangkok	Thailand
2014	Honouorable Mention	Shahzada Hussain Mausoleum	Karez Village, Helmand Province	Afghanistan
2014	Honouorable Mention	Cape Inscription Lighthouse Keepers' Quarters	Shark Bay, Western Australia	Australia
2014	Honouorable Mention	Rottnest Island World War II Coastal Defences	Rottnest Island, Western Australia	Australia
2014	Honouorable Mention	Nanjing Yihe Mansions	Jiangsu Province	China
2014	Honouorable Mention	Esplanade House	Mumbai	India
2014	Honouorable Mention	De Driekleur	Bandung	Indonesia
2014	Honouorable Mention	Gali Surjan Singh	Lahore	Pakistan
2014	Jury Commendation for Innovation	Lucky Shophouse	/	Singapore
2015	Award of Excellence	Sree Vadakkunnathan Temple	Kerala	India
2015	Award of Distinction	Saltpans of Yim Tin Tsai	Hong Kong SAR	China
2015	Award of Distinction	J.N. Petit Institute	Fort, Mumbai	India
2015	Award of Merit	Ping Yao Courtyard Houses	Shanxi Province	China
2015	Award of Merit	Cangdong Heritage Education Centre	Guangdong Province	China
2015	Award of Merit	Xieng Thong Temple	Luang Prabang	Laos
2015	Award of Merit	Baan Luang Rajamaitri	Chantaburi	Thailand
2015	Honouorable Mention	Wanslea Cancer Wellness Centre	Cottesloe, Western Australia	Australia
2015	Honouorable Mention	Sanfang Qixiang	Fuzhou, Fujian Province	China
2015	Honouorable Mention	YHA Mei Ho House Youth Hostel	Hong Kong SAR	China
2015	Honouorable Mention	Parvati Nandan Ganapati Temple	Pune	India
2015	Award for New Design in Heritage Contexts	Port Arthur Penitentiary	Tasmania	Australia
2016	Award of Excellence	Sanro-Den Hall at Sukunahikona Shrine, Ozu City	Ehime Prefecture	Japan
2016	Award of Distinction	Taoping Qiang Village	Sichuan Province	China
2016	Award of Distinction	St. Olav's Church	Serampore, West Bengal	India
2016	Award of Merit	Cama Building	Mumbai Central, Mumbai	India
2016	Award of Merit	Walls and Bastions of Mahidpur Fort	Madhya Pradesh	India
2016	Award of Merit	17th Century Shahi Hammam	Lahore	Pakistan
2016	Honouorable Mention	Wu Changshuo Residence Archaeological Site	Zhejiang Province	China
2016	Honouorable Mention	Fudewan Miner's Village	Zhejiang Province	China
2016	Honouorable Mention	Liu Ancestral Hall	Guizhou Province	China
2016	Honouorable Mention	Old Tai Po Police Station	Hong Kong SAR	China
2016	Honouorable Mention	Doon School Main Building	Dehradun	India
2016	Honouorable Mention	Darugheh House	Khorasan Razavi	Iran
2016	Award for New Design in Heritage Contexts	The Brewery Yard	Chippendale	Australia
2017	Award of Excellence	Blue House Cluster	Hong Kong SAR	China
2017	Award of Distinction	Brookman and Moir Streets Precinct	Perth	Australia
2017	Award of Distinction	Holy Trinity Cathedral	Shanghai	China
2017	Award of Merit	Christ Church	Mumbai	India
2017	Award of Merit	Royal Bombay Opera House	Mumbai	India
2017	Award of Merit	Sri Ranganathaswamy Temple	Srirangam	India
2017	Award of Merit	Great Hall and Clock Tower Buildings, Arts Centre	Christchurch	New Zealand
2017	Honouorable Mention	Bomonjee Hormarjee Wadia Fountain and Clock Tower	Mumbai	India
2017	Honouorable Mention	Gateways of Gohad Fort	Gohad	India
2017	Honouorable Mention	Haveli Dharampura	Delhi	India
2017	Honouorable Mention	Wellington Fountain	Mumbai	India
2017	Honouorable Mention	Aftab Cultural House	Isfahan	Iran
2017	Honouorable Mention	Cathedral of the Good Shepherd and Rectory Building	/	Singapore
2017	Award for New Design in Heritage Contexts	Jingdezhen Ceramic Industry Museum	Jingdezhen	China
2017	Award for New Design in Heritage Contexts	Macha Village	Gansu Province	China
2017	Award for New Design in Heritage Contexts	Persian Gulf University – Faculty of Art & Architecture	Bushehr Province	Iran
2018	Award of Excellence	Shijo-cho Ofune-hoko Float Machiya	Kyoto	Japan
2018	Award of Distinction	The LAMO Centre	Ladakh	India
2018	Award of Merit	5 Martin Place	Sydney	Australia
2018	Award of Merit	Aijing Zhuang	Fujian	China
2018	Award of Merit	Old Brick Warehouse of the Commercial Bank of Honjo	Saitama	Japan
2018	Honourable Mention	Hengdaohezi Town	Heilongjiang	China
2018	Honourable Mention	Rajabai Clock Tower & University of Mumbai Library Building	Mumbai	India
2018	Honourable Mention	Ruttonsee Muljee Jetha Fountain	Mumbai	India
2018	Award for New Design in Heritage Contexts	Kaomai Estate 1955	Chiang Mai	Thailand
2018	Award for New Design in Heritage Contexts	The Hart's Mill	Port Adelaide	Australia
2019	Award of Excellence	Tai Kwun – Centre for Heritage and Arts	Hong Kong SAR	China
2019	Award of Distinction	Keyuan Garden	Suzhou	China
2019	Award of Distinction	Vikram Sarabhai Library, Indian Institute of Management	Ahmedabad	India
2019	Award of Distinction	Nelson School of Music	Nelson	New Zealand
2019	Award of Merit	Tseto Goenpa	Paro	Bhutan
2019	Award of Merit	Guyue Bridge	Chi'an Town, Zhejiang	China
2019	Award of Merit	Keneseth Eliyahoo Synagogue	Mumbai	India
2019	Award of Merit	Our Lady of Glory Church	Mumbai	India
2019	Award of Merit	Lyttelton Timeball Station	Christchurch	New Zealand
2019	Honourable Mention	The 5s Classroom, Preshil The Margaret Lyttle Memorial School	Kew	Australia
2019	Honourable Mention	Westpac Long Gallery, Australian Museum	Sydney	Australia
2019	Honourable Mention	Liddell Bros. Packing Plant	Wuhan	China
2019	Honourable Mention	Flora Fountain	Mumbai	India
2019	Award for New Design in Heritage Contexts	Joan Sutherland Theatre Passageway & Lift, Sydney Opera House	Sydney	Australia
2019	Award for New Design in Heritage Contexts	Dry Pit Latrine in Jiaxian Ancient Jujube Garden	Nihegou Village, Shaanxi	China
2019	Award for New Design in Heritage Contexts	The Mills	Hong Kong SAR	China
2020	Award of Excellence	Sunder Nursery #	New Delhi	India
2020	Award of Distinction	Koothambalam at Guruvayoor Temple	Thrissur	India
2020	Award of Merit	Pingyao Diesel Engine Factory	Shanxi	China
2020	Award of Merit	Amar Singh College	Srinagar	India
2020	Award of Merit	Malabari Hall Building, Seva Sadan Society	Mumbai	India
2020	New Design in Heritage Contexts	Protective Shelter at the Locality 1 Archaeological Site of Zhoukoudian Peking Man Cave World Heritage Site	Beijing	China
2020	Special Recognition for Sustainable Development	Lai Chi Wo Rural Cultural Landscape	Hong Kong SAR	China
2020	Special Recognition for Sustainable Development	Sunder Nursery #	New Delhi	India
2021	Award of Excellence	Nizamuddin Basti #	New Delhi	India
2021	Award of Distinction	Jingdezhen Pengjia Alley Compound	Jiangxi	China
2021	Award of Distinction	Kesennuma Historic Citiscape #	Miyagi	Japan
2021	Award of Merit	Doleshwar Hanafia Jame Mosque	Dhaka	Bangladesh
2021	Award of Merit	Thai Pak Koong (Ng Suk) Temple	Penang	Malaysia
2021	Award of Merit	Baan Khun Phithak Raya	Pattani	Thailand
2021	New Design in Heritage Contexts	Shajing Ancient Fair #	Shenzhen	China
2021	New Design in Heritage Contexts	Songyang Culture Neighborhood	Zhejiang	China
2021	Special Recognition for Sustainable Development	Shajing Ancient Fair #	Shenzhen	China
2021	Special Recognition for Sustainable Development	Nizamuddin Basti #	New Delhi	India
2021	Special Recognition for Sustainable Development	Kesennuma Historic Citiscape #	Miyagi	Japan
2021	Special Recognition for Sustainable Development	Mrigadayavan Palace Woodshop	Phetchaburi	Thailand
2022	Award of Excellence	Chhatrapati Shivaji Maharaj Vastu Sangrahalaya Museum	Mumbai	India
2022	Award of Distinction	Stepwells of Golconda	Hyderabad	India
2022	Award of Distinction	Zarch Qanat	Yazd	Iran
2022	Award of Distinction	Neilson Hays Library	Bangkok	Thailand
2022	Award of Merit	Topdara Stupa	Charikar	Afghanistan
2022	Award of Merit	Nantian Buddhist Temple	Fujian Province	China
2022	Award of Merit	Domakonda Fort	Telangana	India
2022	Award of Merit	Byculla Station	Mumbai	India
2022	Award of Merit	Sadoughi House	Yazd	Iran
2022	Award of Merit	25 Chivas in Kathmandu	/	Nepal
2022	Special Recognition for Sustainable Development	West Guizhou Lilong Neighborhood	Shanghai	China
2022	New Design in Heritage Contexts	M30 Integrated Infrastructure for Power Supply and Waste Collection	Macao SAR	China
2022	New Design in Heritage Contexts	Xiaoxihu Block	Nanjing	China
2023	Award of Excellence	Rambagh Gate and Ramparts	Punjab	India
2023	Award of Distinction	Fanling Golf Course	Hong Kong SAR	China
2023	Award of Distinction	Dongguan Garden Residences	Yangzhou	China
2023	Award of Distinction	Karnikara Mandapam, Kunnamangalam Bhagawati Temple #	Kerala	India
2023	Award of Merit	Yan Nan Yuan, Peking University	Beijing	China
2023	Award of Merit	Pan Family Residence	Suzhou	China
2023	Award of Merit	Church of Epiphany	Haryana	India
2023	Award of Merit	David Sassoon Library and Reading Room	Mumbai	India
2023	Award of Merit	Bikaner House	New Delhi	India
2023	Award for New Design in Heritage Contexts	Erlitou Site Museum of the Xia Capital	Luoyang	China
2023	Special Recognition for Sustainable Development	Karnikara Mandapam, Kunnamangalam Bhagawati Temple #	Kerala	India
2023	Special Recognition for Sustainable Development	Pipal Haveli	Punjab	India
2023	Special Recognition for Sustainable Development	Sikami Chhen	Kathmandu	Nepal
2024	Award of Excellence	Inari-yu Bathhouse Restoration Project	Tokyo	Japan
2024	Award of Distinction	Gunan Street Historic Block Conservation Project #	Yixing, Jiangsu	China
2024	Award of Distinction	Abathsahayeshwarar Temple Conservation Project	Thukkatchi, Tamil Nadu	India
2024	Award of Merit	Guanyin Hall Teahouse Conservation Project	Chengdu, Sichuan	China
2024	Award of Merit	Helou Pavilion Conservation Project #	Shanghai	China
2024	Award of Merit	BJPCI Conservation Project	Mumbai	India
2024	Award of Merit	Observatory Tower Conservation Project	Christchurch	New Zealand
2024	Award for New Design in Heritage Contexts	Rabindhorn Building	Bangkok	Thailand
2024	Special Recognition for Sustainable Development	Gunan Street Historic Block Conservation Project #	Yixing, Jiangsu	China
2024	Special Recognition for Sustainable Development	Helou Pavilion Conservation Project #	Shanghai	China
