= Abha Narain Lambah =

Indian conservation architect (born 1970)

- Born: 1970 (age 55–56); Calcutta, India
- Occupation: Architect
- Awards: ARCHITECTURAL DIGEST INTERNATIONAL WoW List 2022 13 UNESCO Asia Pacific Heritage Conservation Awards; Architectural Digest Architect of the Year Award 2019 Architectural Digest Top 100 Awards for 10 years; HUDCO Best Restoration Project 2020, 2019, 2018; PRIX Versailles Best Interior Retail Asia Pacific Award 2020; CNBC Awaaz ARCHITECT OF THE YEAR 2018 Eisenhower Fellowship (2002)
- Projects: Ajanta Caves, David Sassoon Library's 2023 Restoration
- Website: www.anlassociates.com

Abha Narain Lambah (born 1970) is an Indian conservation architect whose eponymous architectural practice has restored several of India's UNESCO World Heritage Sites like the Ajanta Caves, Golconda Fort and Mahabodhi Temple, and Mumbai's Victorian buildings like the Crawford Market, Royal Opera House, Asiatic Society of Mumbai Town Hall and Knesset Eliyahoo Synagogue.

The firm's work has been recognised by 13 UNESCO Asia-Pacific Awards for Cultural Heritage Conservation. In 2007 her work of the Conservation of the Chamba Lakhang Buddha Temple in Basgo Ladakh won the Award of Excellence and the Convocation Hall Mumbai University the Award of Distinction UNESCO Asia Pacific Awards. In 2017, their restoration work on the Royal Opera House, India's only surviving opera house, was given the Award of Merit under the UNESCO Asia-Pacific Awards for Cultural Heritage Conservation.

Their ongoing projects include the restoration of the Mughal Garden of Shalimar Bagh Kashmir, Preparation of UNESCO Nomination for the Mughal Gardens of Kashmir; Sarnath and Monuments of Mandu. The firm prepared the successful UNESCO Nomination Dossiers for the World Heritage Sites of Rabindranath's Santiniketan and Mumbai's Victorian and Art Deco Ensembles as well as Management Plans for Amber Fort and for Le Corbusier's historic Chandigarh Capitol Complex in Chandigarh.

The architectural practice has worked on a range of historic forts and caravanserais across Rajasthan, Maharashtra and Punjab as well as Buddhist sites such as Bodh Gaya, Sarnath, Ajanta and Basgo.

Abha has been on the Expert Committee for the Rashtrapati Bhavan Museum and Mentor Indian Museum Kolkata. The practice has over the last 25 years, focused on museum projects across the country that include Chhatrapati Shivaji Maharaj Vastu Sangrahalaya Mumbai, Chowmahalla Palace Museum Hyderabad, Jaivilas Palace Museum Gwalior, Lalbagh Palace Museum Indore, Bharatpur Museum, Jaipur Metro Museum, Anand Bhavan Allahabad, Nehru Memorial Library & Museum Delhi, Mani Bhavan Gandhi Sangrahalaya Mumbai and Russia's oldest museum, the Kunstkamera. She is currently working on the Museums of Freedom & Kashmir at Delhi's Red Fort Delhi, Balasaheb Thackeray Rashtriya Smarak and Urban Conservation at Vadnagar. She served on the Governing Council INTACH and was Jury Chair – ADC Awards New York and has been a juror on the Golden Trezzini Awards.

== Early life ==
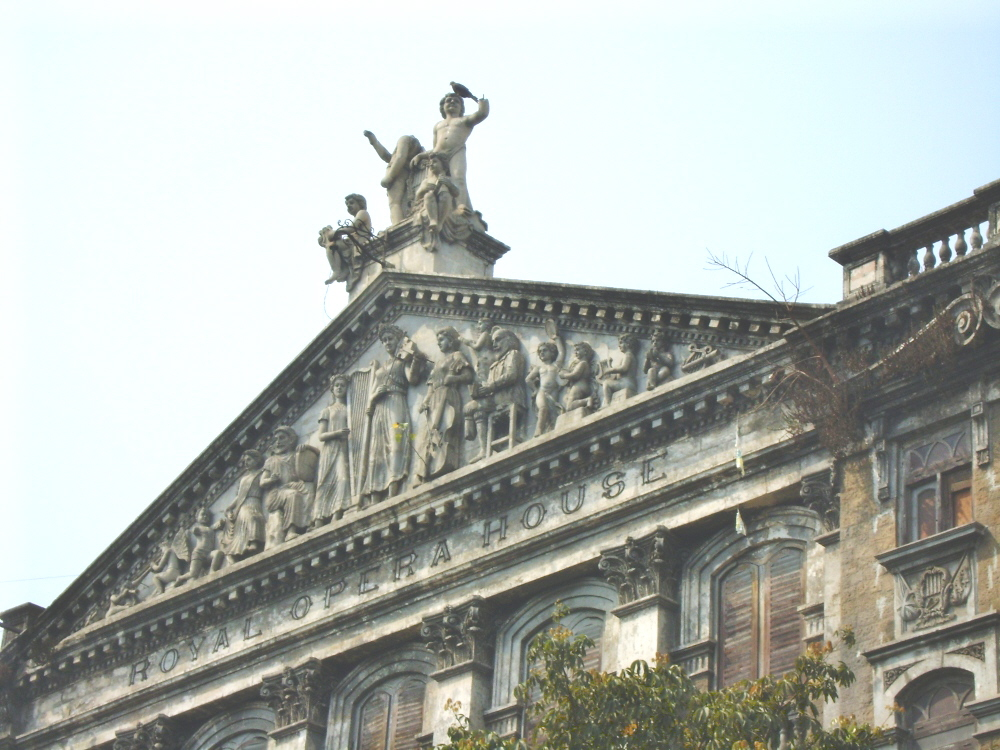
The pediment of Royal Opera House, Mumbai before restoration.

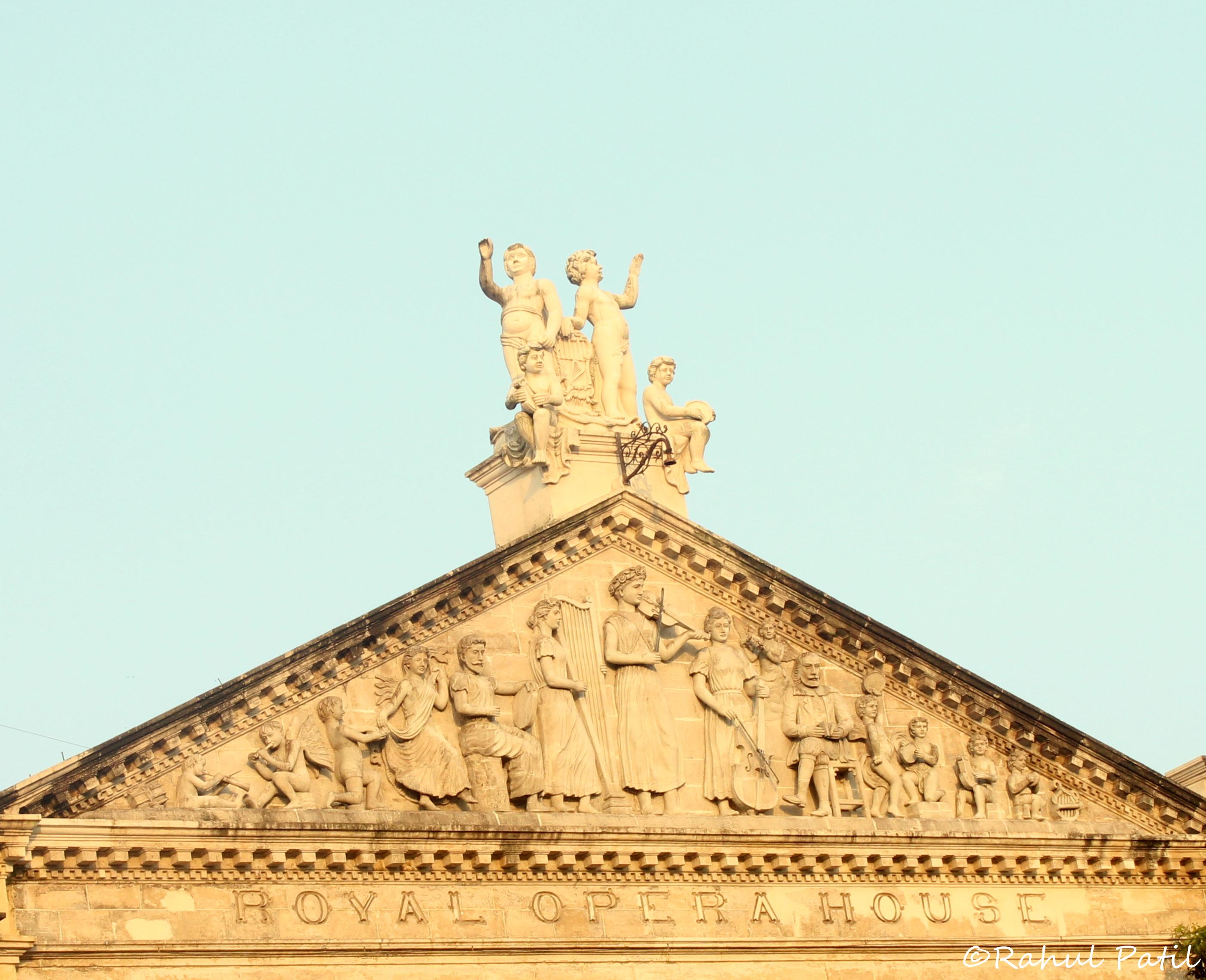
The pediment after restoration.

Lambah was born in Calcutta (now Kolkata) and grew up in Ballygunge. She attended the Loreto House school and then graduated from the School of Planning and Architecture, New Delhi.

== Career ==
Lambah set up her architectural practice in 1996. Her first project was to finalise urban signage and street furniture guidelines for Dadabhai Naoroji Road, along which many of the city's Gothic Revival and Neoclassical buildings are located. In 2000, she became a conservation consultant to Rahul Mehrotra Associates, who were restoring the Chowmahalla Palace in Hyderabad. Between 2004 and 2006, she worked on the 15th-century Basgo Monastery and restored the Maitreya Buddha. Since 2010, she has restored many of Mumbai's Victorian, Neo-Gothic and Indo-Saracenic buildings, such as the Municipal Corporation Building, Crawford Market, Prince of Wales Museum, Convocation Hall, University of Mumbai, Knesset Eliyahoo Synagogue, Mumbai. Lambah has acknowledged the influence of Joseph Allen Stein and Charles Correa on her practice.

== Honours ==
- Eisenhower Fellowship (2002)
- Award of Merit, UNESCO Asia-Pacific Awards for Cultural Heritage Conservation (2017) - Royal Opera House (Mumbai)
- Honourable Mention, UNESCO Asia-Pacific Awards for Cultural Heritage Conservation (2010) - Chhatrapati Shivaji Maharaj Vastu Sangrahalaya.

== See also ==
- Aishwarya Tipnis
- Vikas Dilawari
- Bruno Souza (architect)

== Books ==
- Lambah, Abha Narain, ed. (2017). The Land of the Five Rivers: Mapping the Architectural Landscape of Punjab. Marg Foundation. ISBN 978-9383243167.
- Lambah, Abha Narain, ed. (2013). Shekhawati: Havelis of the Merchant Princes. Marg Foundation. ISBN 978-8192110684.
