= Sanfang Qixiang =

Historic area in Fuzhou, Fujian, China

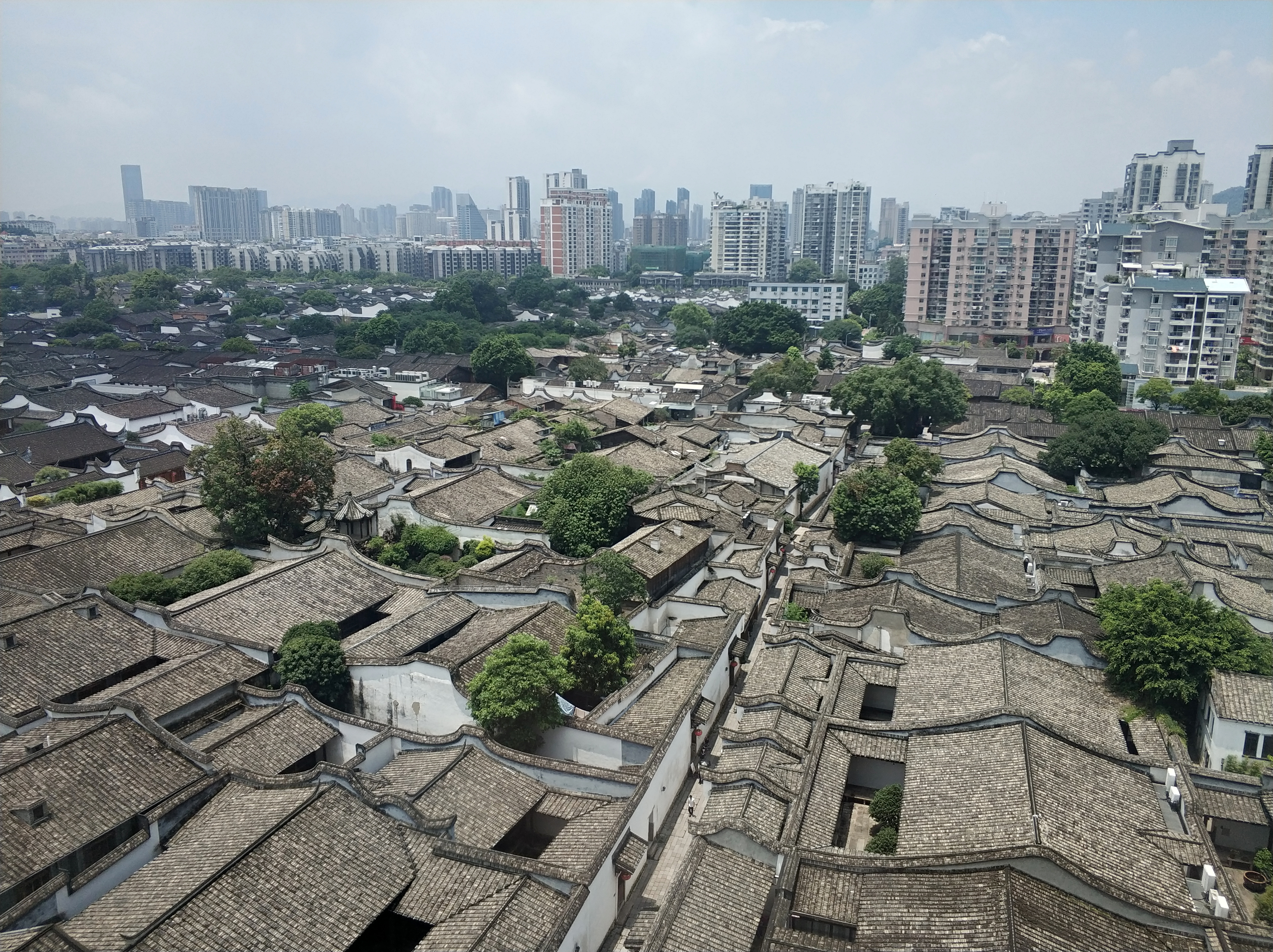
Aerial view of Sanfang Qixiang

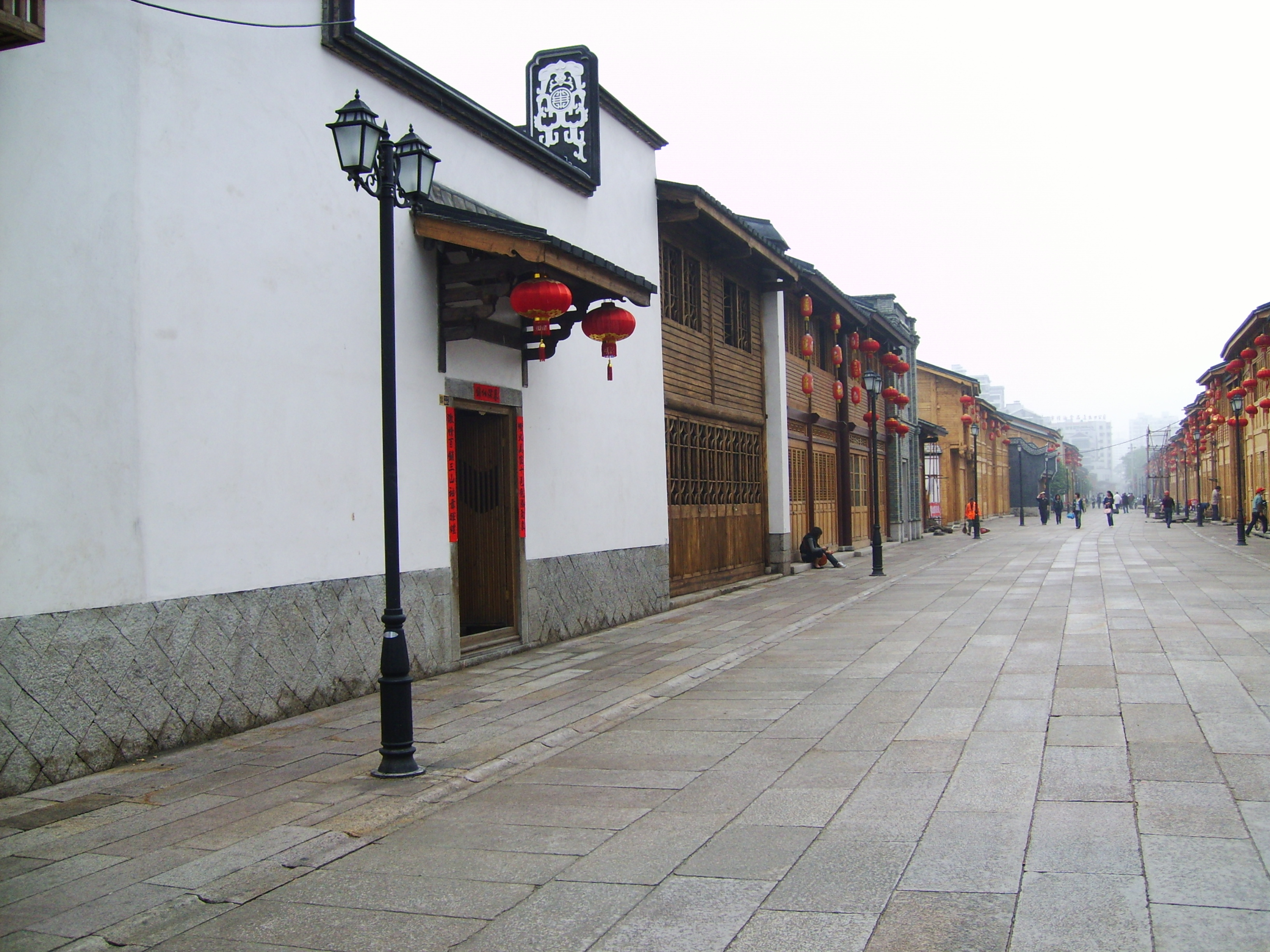
View of Nanhou Road, through Sanfang Qixiang

Sanfang Qixiang (Chinese: 三坊七巷; pinyin: Sānfāng Qīxiàng; Foochow Romanized: Săng-huŏng-chék-háe̤ng; lit. 'Three Lanes and Seven Alleys') is a historic and cultural area in the city of Fuzhou. Its name is derived from the three lanes (Chinese: 坊; pinyin: fāng; Foochow Romanized: huŏng) and seven alleys (Chinese: 巷; pinyin: xiàng Foochow Romanized: háe̤ng) that comprise the area.

== History ==
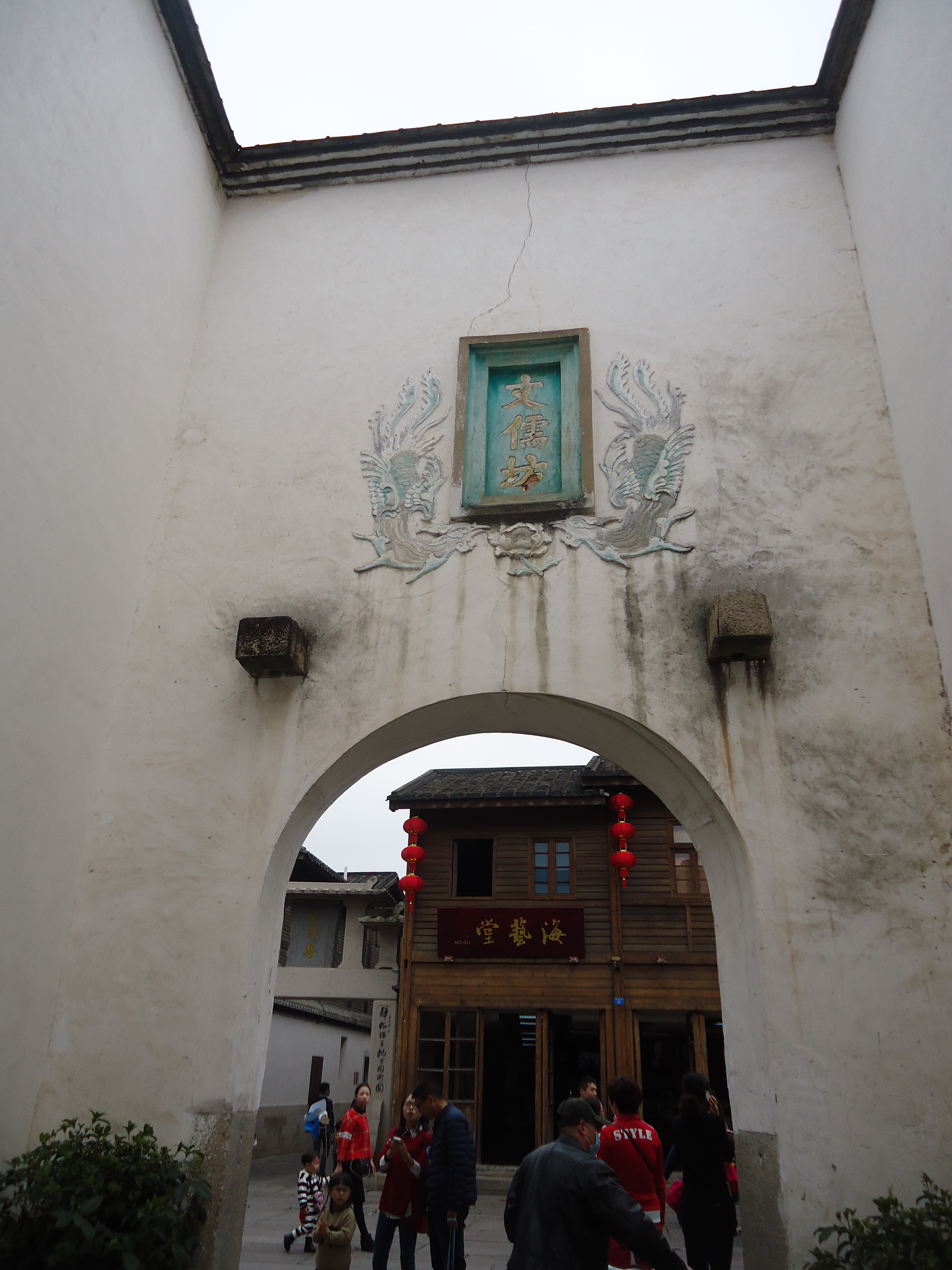
One of the Three Lanes, Wenru Lane (文儒坊), in 2015

The district is bisected by the north-south modern pedestrian thoroughfare Nanhou Street (simplified Chinese: 南后街; traditional Chinese: 南後路) and roughly centered around the intersection of Nanhou Street and Anmin Alley. It is bounded by Bayiqi Road (Chinese: 八一七路) to the east and Tonghu Road (Chinese: 通湖路) to the west. It is also bounded by Guanglu Lane to the south and Yangqiao Road (simplified Chinese: 杨桥路; traditional Chinese: 楊橋路) to the north.

Covering a total area of 0.38 square kilometers (0.15 sq mi), it is celebrated as an architectural museum of Ming and Qing dynasty buildings, including numerous National Designated Monuments such as the historic residences of notable figures. Due to the high number of rich, famous and powerful residents, counting 400 in total over the past few centuries, this area has been dubbed the "Beverly Hills of imperial China". Since 2015, it has been designated as a 5A-Rated Tourist Attraction by the Ministry of Culture and Tourism.

The area is considered a classic example of the "residential ward" or lǐfāng system (Chinese: 里坊制; pinyin: lǐfāng-zhì), a traditional form of urban planning dating back as early as the Tang dynasty. Thanks to its status as a "living fossil" of such a system, it was inscribed on the UNESCO World Heritage Tentative List in 2013, and later designated a National Historic and Cultural Street by the Ministry of Housing and Urban-Rural Development and State Administration of Cultural Heritage in 2015. Owing to the extraordinary efforts to protect the historic fabrics from Sanfang Qixiang Administration, it was awarded an honorable mention of the 2015 UNESCO Asia-Pacific Heritage Awards.

== Areas ==
Three Fang

- Yijin Lane (Chinese: 衣锦坊)
- Wenru Lane (Chinese: 文儒坊)
- Guanglu Lane (Chinese: 光禄坊)

Seven Xiang

- Yangqiao Alley (Chinese: 杨桥巷)
- Langguan Alley (Chinese: 郎官巷)
- Ta Alley (Chinese: 塔巷)
- Huang Alley (Chinese: 黄巷)
- Anmin Alley (Chinese: 安民巷)
- Gong Alley (Chinese: 宫巷)
- Jipi Alley (Chinese: 吉庇巷)>

== Notable residents ==
- Zhang Jing
- Lin Zexu
- Chen Baochen
- Zheng Xiaoxu
- Shen Baozhen
- Sa Zhenbing
- Liu Guanxiong
- Yan Fu
- Lin Shu
- Bing Xin
- Lu Yin
- Lin Huiyin
- Lin Juemin
- Wong Tsu
- Shu Chun Teng
- Deng Tuo
