= University Library, Mumbai =

Library of the University of Mumbai in India

University Library
- Bombay University Library
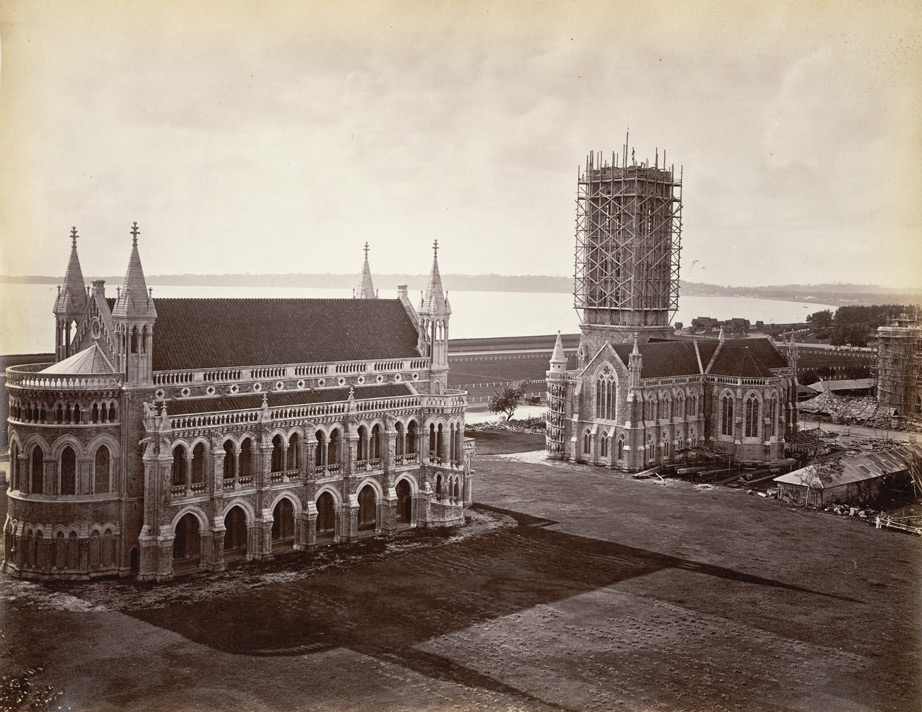
- An 1870s photograph of the library with the Rajabai Clock Tower under construction on top; to the left is the Bombay University Convocation Hall

- Location within Mumbai Location within India
- 18.929775°N 72.830027°E
- Location: Oval Maidan

History
- Built: 1878

Site notes
- Area: Fort, Mumbai
- Architect: Sir George Gilbert Scott
- Architectural styles: Gothic Revival, Venetian Gothic

UNESCO World Heritage Site
- Type: Cultural
- Criteria: ii, iv
- Designated: 2018
- Part of: Victorian Gothic and Art Deco Ensembles of Mumbai
- Reference no.: 1480

The University Library of the University of Mumbai is part of the Victorian buildings complex around the Oval Maidan in Mumbai that is a UNESCO World Heritage Site. It was built between 1869 and 1878 along with the Rajabai Clock Tower, and designed by Sir George Gilbert Scott, who incidentally never visited Bombay and worked from London.

The foundation stone for the library was laid on 1 March 1869, and it formally opened for the students and faculty on 27 February 1880.

== Gallery ==
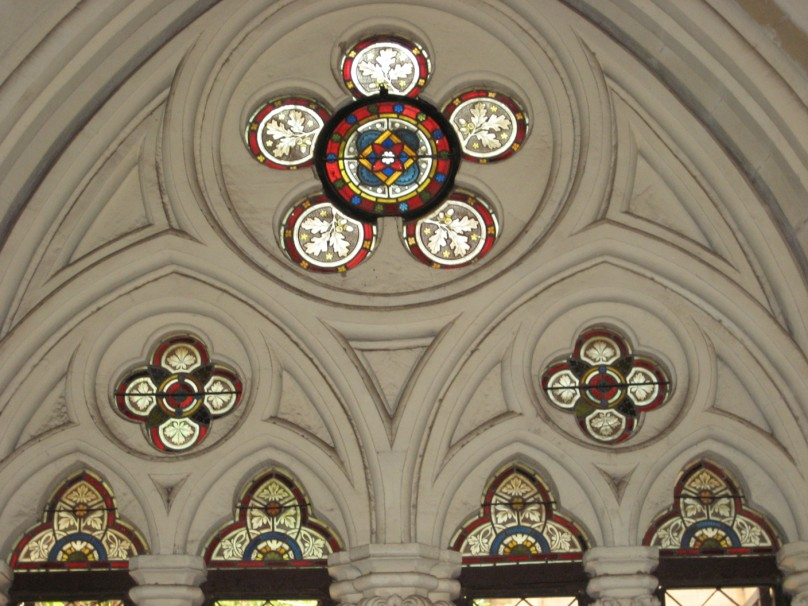
Stained glass in the library

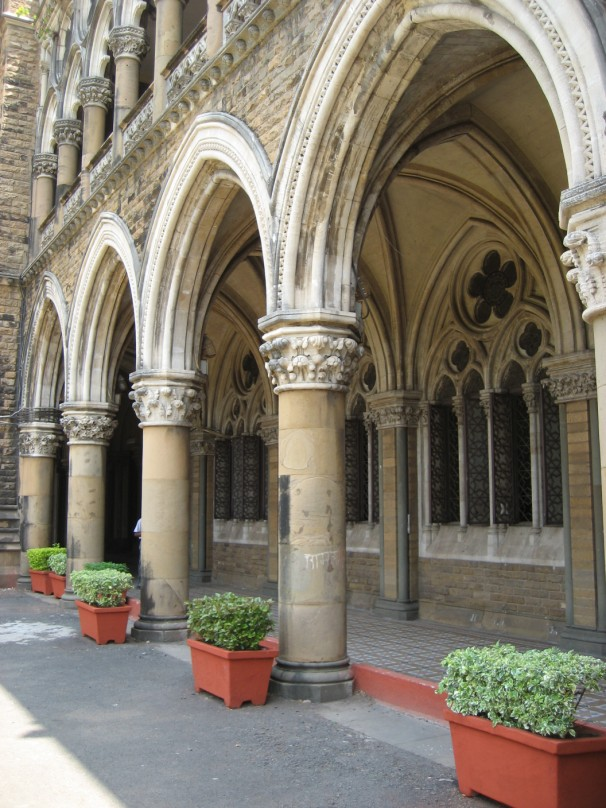
The architectural style is a mix of Venetian Gothic and Neoclassical

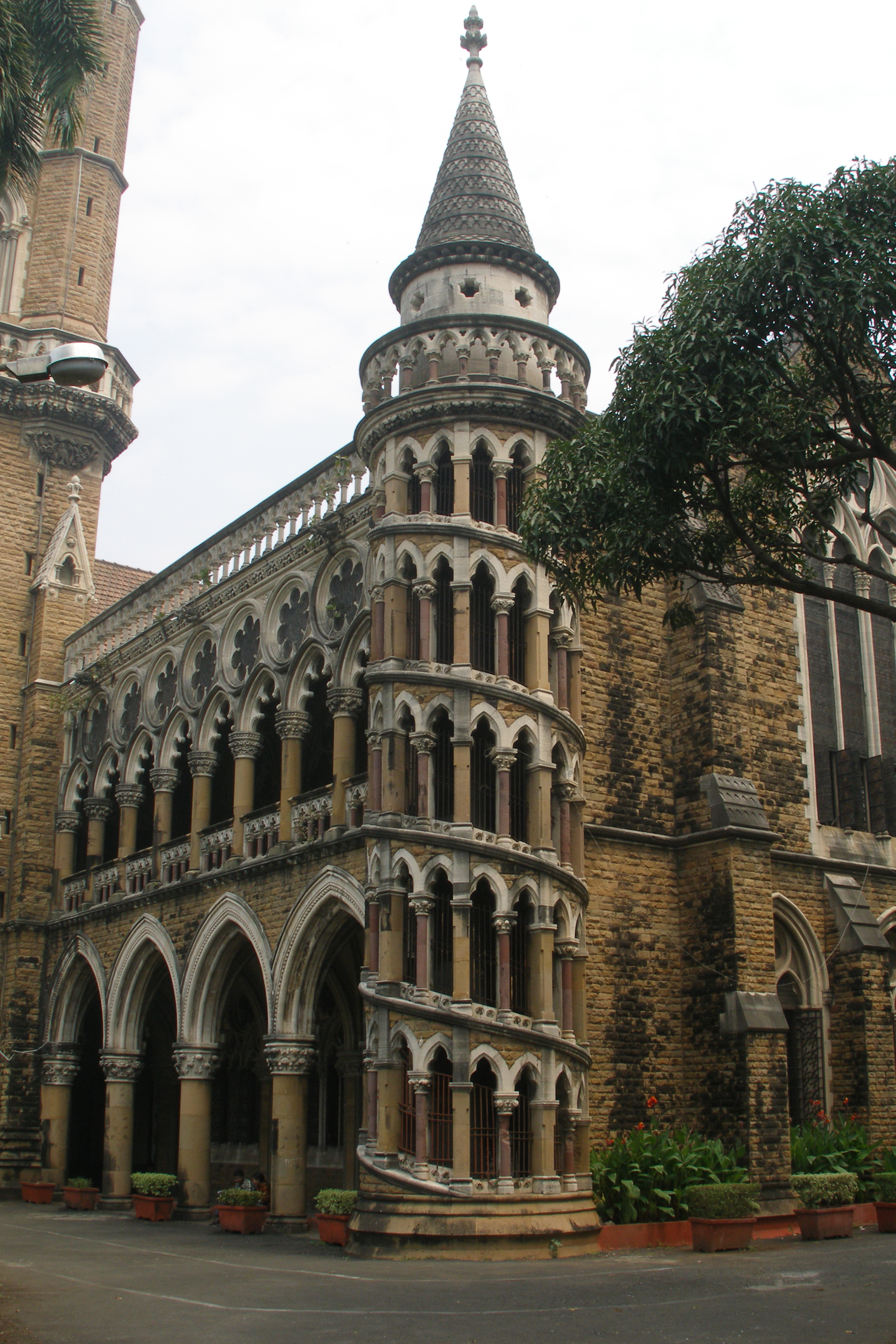

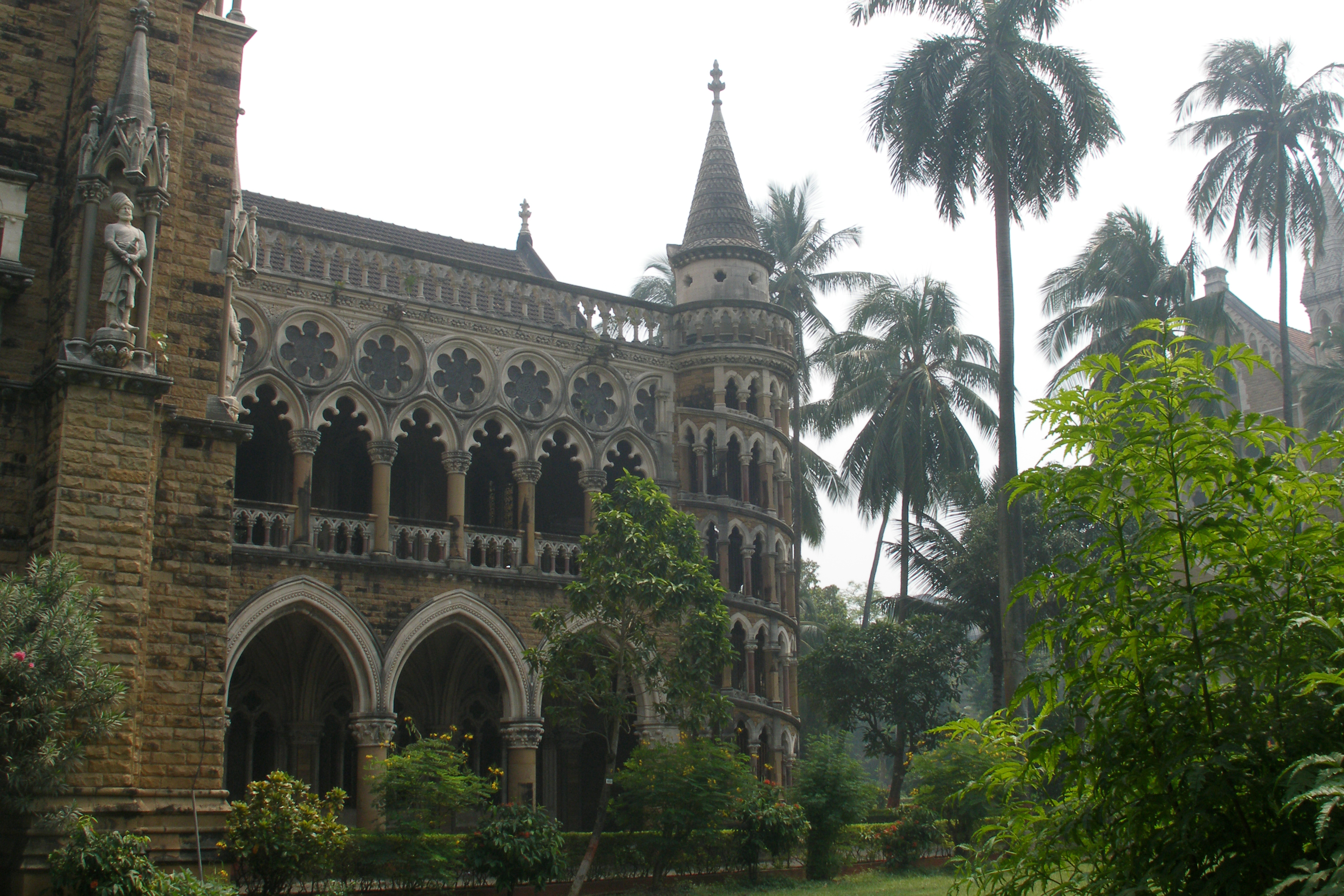

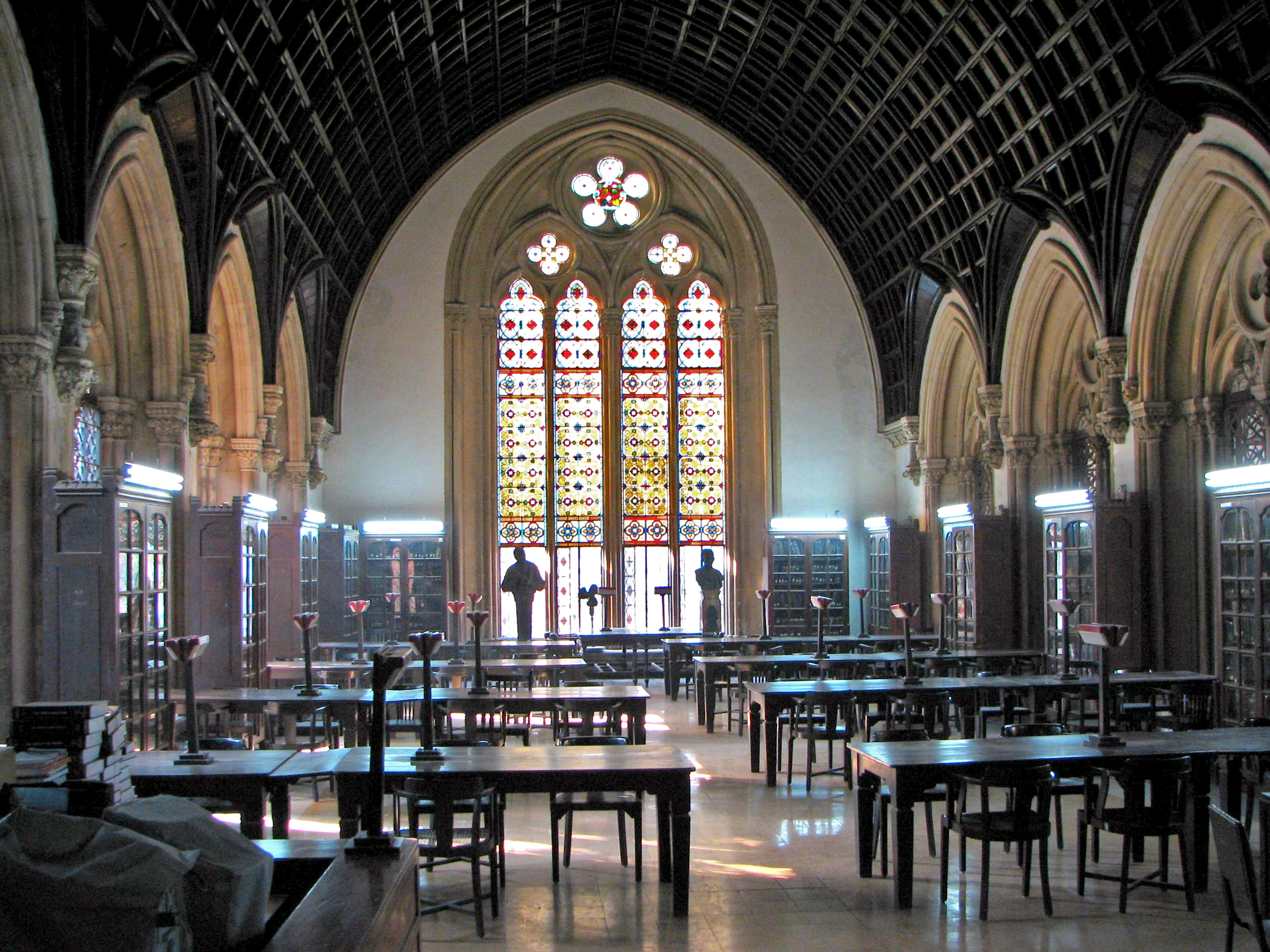
The interiors of the library
