= Galle Fort Hotel =

Coordinates: 6°1′35.76″N 80°13′3.36″E

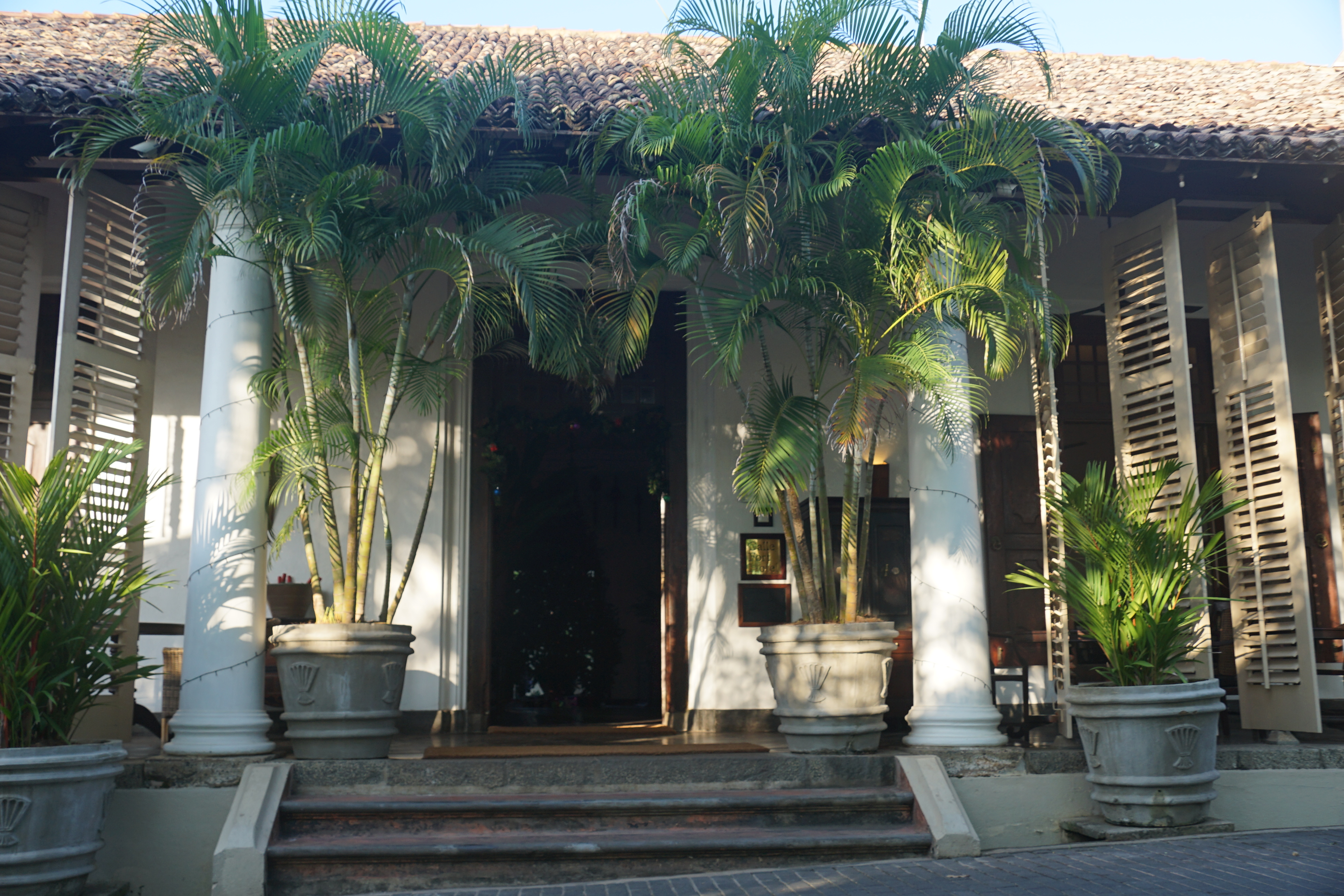
- Galle Fort Hotel entrance
- Interactive map of the Galle Fort Hotel area

General information
- Location: Galle, Sri Lanka, No.28, Church Street, Galle Fort
- Owner: Colombo Fort Hotels

Other information
- Number of rooms: 12
- Number of restaurants: 1

Website
- Galle Fort Hotel official website

The Galle Fort Hotel in Sri Lanka is a 12-room boutique hotel, situated inside Galle Fort, Galle. The building was originally constructed in the 17th century, during the Dutch colonial period, as a private dwelling.

== Historical background ==
Galle Fort was built on 16th century by the Portuguese. It was then taken over by the Dutch in 1640. The Dutch improved and modified the buildings inside with Dutch architecture. In 1988, UNESCO (United Nations Educational, Scientific and Cultural Organization) listed Galle Fort as a World Heritage Site.

In 1999 the Sri Lankan government lifted the 100% tax on foreign ownership, which resulted in Australian, Karl Steinberg, and his Malaysian partner Christopher Ong purchasing a dilapidated 17th century Dutch merchant's house in Galle Fort. They spent two years renovating the house, which is the biggest in Galle, according to traditional building techniques and using local craftsmen. The house was turned into a 12-room boutique hotel and named Galle Fort Hotel.

The hotel survived the 2004 tsunami.

In 2007 it was awarded the UNESCO Asia Pacific Heritage Awards of Distinction, for heritage conservation. The citation included the following:

This carefully considered transformation of an abandoned historic residential compound into a stylish luxury boutique hotel has evocatively captured the spirit of place of the colonial World Heritage fortified town of Galle. The restoration has been carried out with sensitivity to the historic fabric and the surrounding urban context, retaining the buildings modest scale and street façade. The removal of unsympathetic elements has revealed the original Dutch Villa and its later English architectural Dutch influences, while the elegant interior design and modern additions have added new layers of meaning. The restoration was undertaken using local expertise and craftsmanship.

The hotel was the winner of 'Sri Lanka's Leading Boutique Hotel' at the 2010 World Travel Awards.

In 2011 it was purchased by Colombo Fort Hotels, an associate company of Lankem Ceylon PLC, for US$7.0m.

The Galle Fort Hotel is a member of the network Small Luxury Hotels of the World.

== Literature ==
- Warren, William; Gocher, Jill (2007). Asia's Legendary Hotels: The Romance of Travel. Singapore: Periplus Editions. ISBN 978-0-7946-0174-4.

== See also ==
- Galle
- Galle fort
