= Convocation Hall, University of Mumbai =

Convocation hall in Mumbai, India

Convocation Hall
- Bombay University Convocation Hall
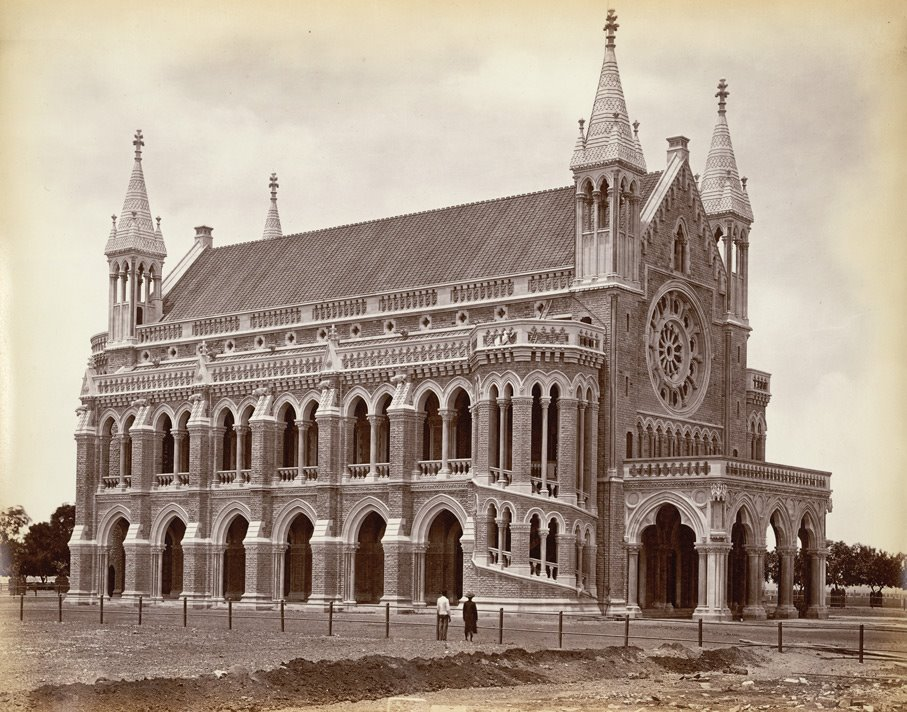
- An 1870s photograph of the Convocation Hall

- Location within Mumbai Location within India
- 18.929775°N 72.830027°E
- Location: Oval Maidan

History
- Built: 1874

Site notes
- Area: Fort, Mumbai
- Architect: Sir George Gilbert Scott
- Architectural styles: Gothic Revival, Venetian Gothic

UNESCO World Heritage Site
- Type: Cultural
- Criteria: ii, iv
- Designated: 2018
- Part of: Victorian Gothic and Art Deco Ensembles of Mumbai
- Reference no.: 1480

The Convocation Hall or Cowasji Jehangir Convocation Hall at the University of Mumbai is part of the Victorian buildings complex around the Oval Maidan in Mumbai that is a UNESCO World Heritage Site. It was built between 1869 and 1874, and designed by Sir George Gilbert Scott, who incidentally never visited Bombay and worked from London.

It is also known as the Cowasji Jehangir Convocation Hall, after the Parsi philanthropist Cowasji Jehangir Readymoney, who funded the construction. In 2006–07, the hall was restored by a team led by the conservation architect Abha Narain Lambah. The project was given the Award of Distinction under the UNESCO Asia-Pacific Awards for Cultural Heritage Conservation.

== Gallery ==
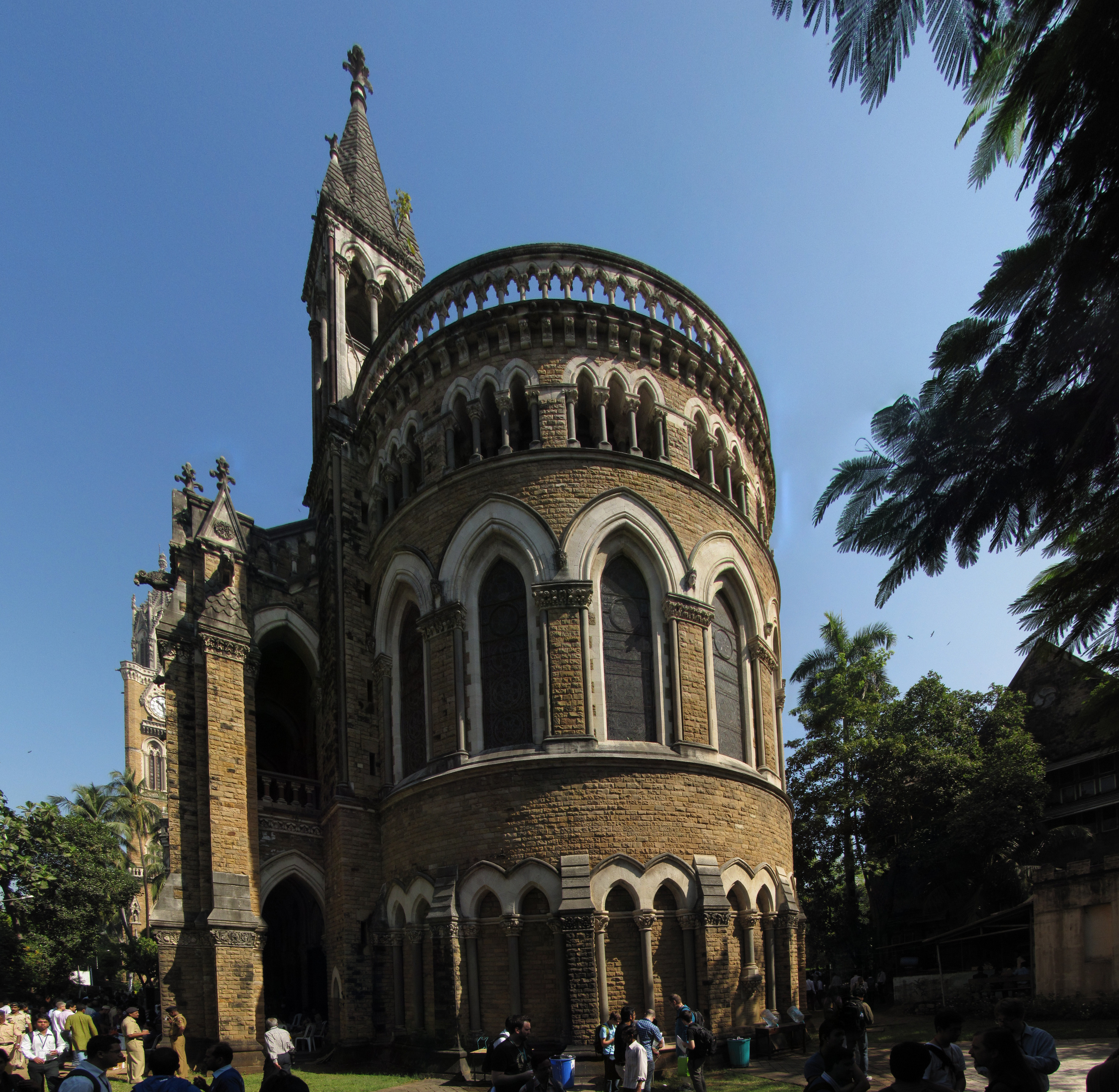
The semi-circular 'chancel' of the hall

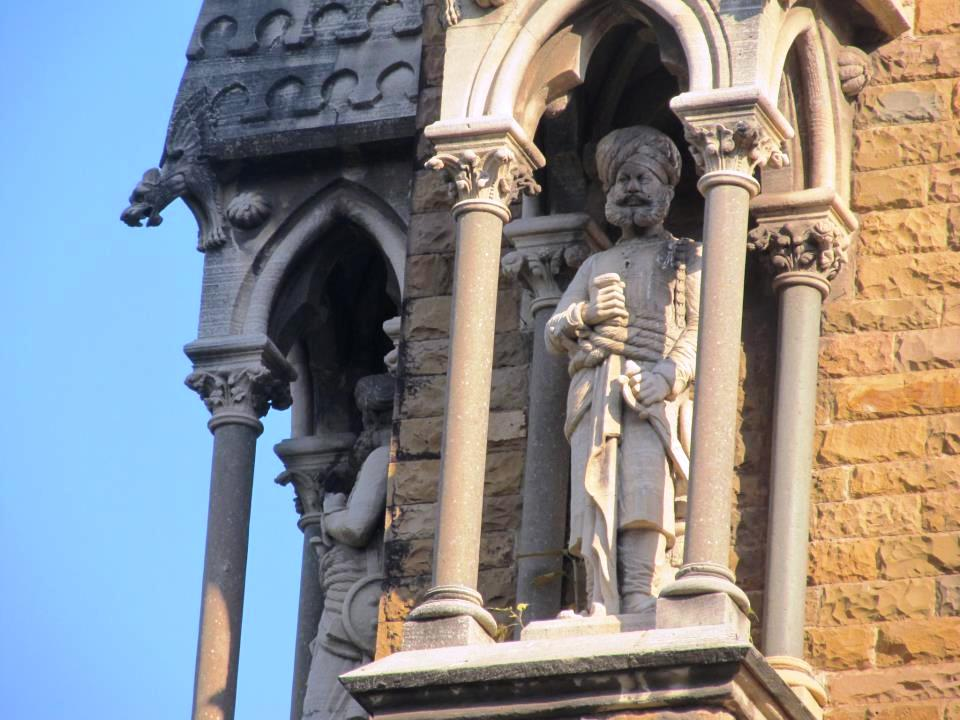
A statue of an Indian prince in a niche

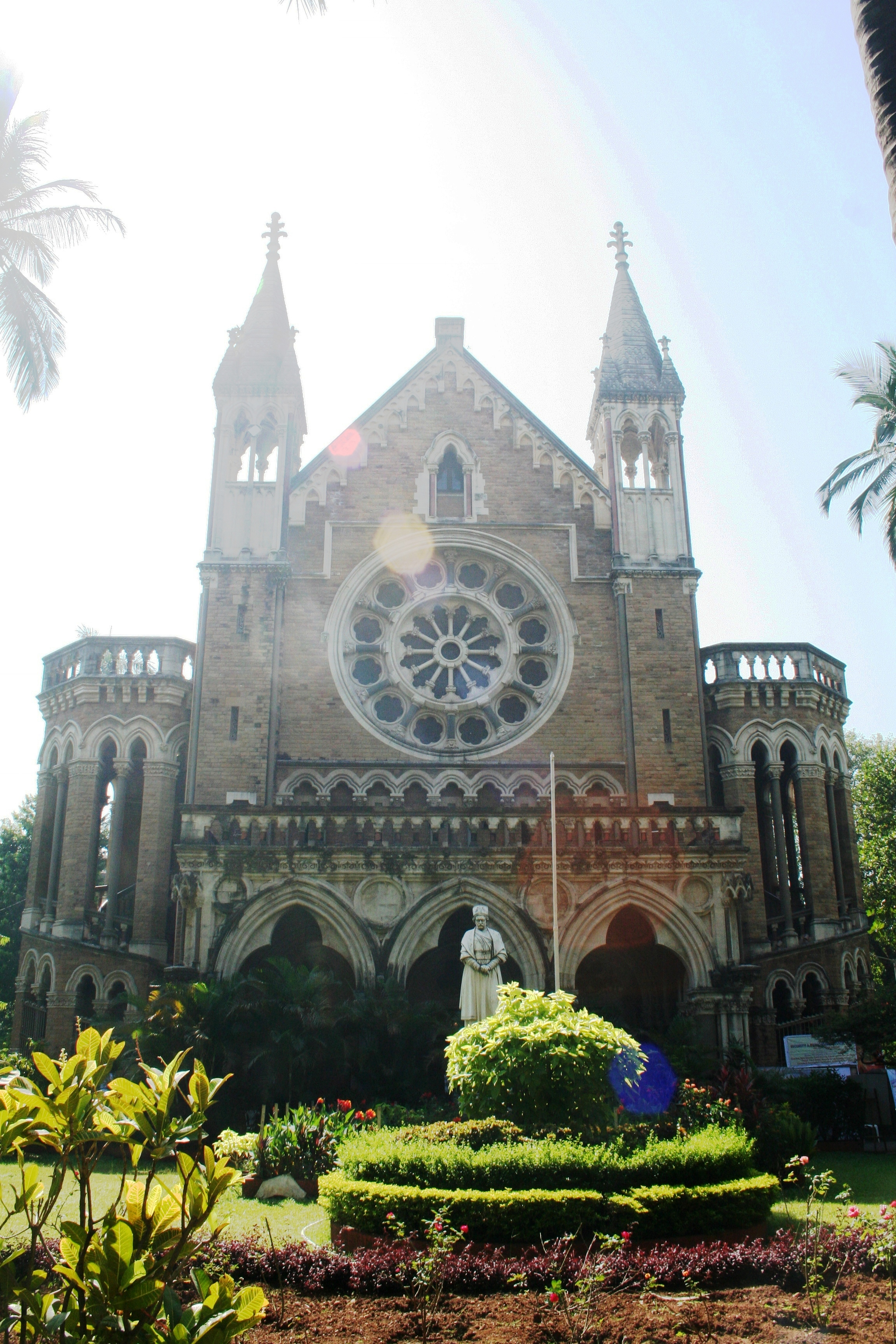
The circular stained glass window with designs of the Zodiac signs

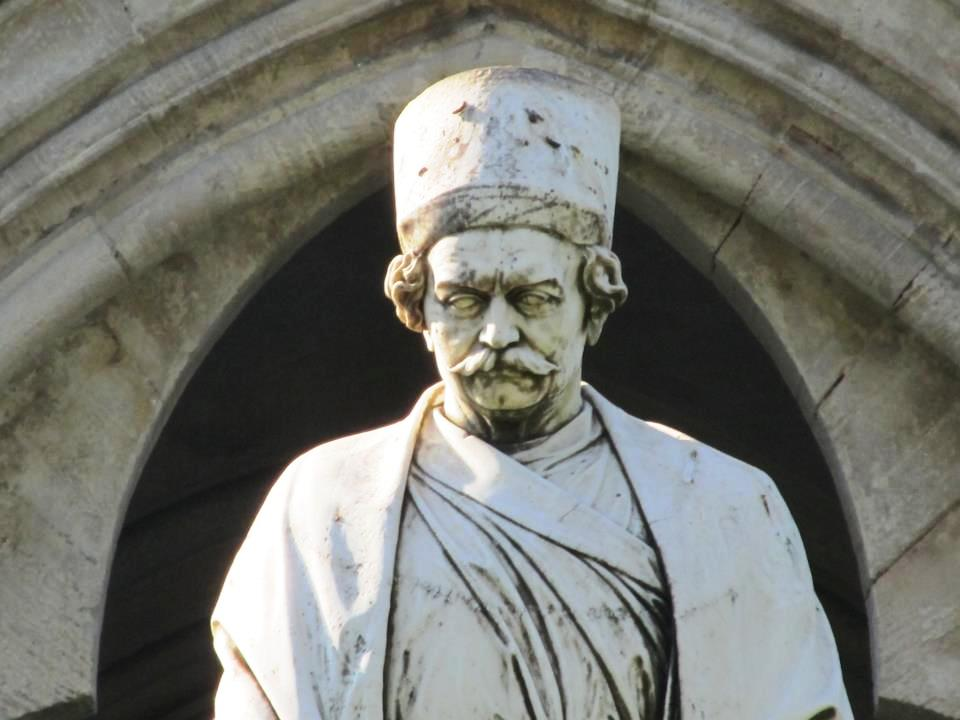
A statue of Cowasji Jehangir Readymoney who donated money for construction
