= M24 Japanese Midget Submarine wreck site =

- Location of M24 Japanese Midget Submarine wreck site off Sydney's Northern Beaches M24 Japanese Midget Submarine wreck site (Australia)
- 33°40′21″S 151°22′58″E
- Location: Unincorporated waters off Sydney's Northern Beaches, New South Wales, Australia

History
- Built: 1941–1942

Site notes
- Architect: Imperial Japanese Navy

New South Wales Heritage Register
- Official name: M24 Japanese Midget Submarine wreck site; Type A midget submarine
- Type: State heritage (archaeological-maritime)
- Designated: 7 December 2007
- Reference no.: 1785
- Type: Naval vessel
- Category: Transport - Water
- Builders: Kure Naval Yard or Ourazaki Naval Yard

M24 Japanese Midget Submarine wreck site is a heritage-listed former midget submarine and now archaeological site located in unincorporated waters off Sydney's Northern Beaches in New South Wales, Australia. The Ko-hyoteki-class midget submarine (also known as a Type A midget submarine) was designed by the Imperial Japanese Navy and built from 1941 to 1942 by Kure Naval Yard or Ourazaki Naval Yard. The site was added to the New South Wales State Heritage Register on 7 December 2007.

The wreck site is located 55 metres (180 ft) below sea level and approximately 5 kilometres (2.7 nmi; 3.1 mi) from Bungan Head.

== History ==
The Japanese midget submarine attack on Sydney Harbour was audacious and would have been even more spectacular had the primary military targets been successfully damaged. The attack showed the vulnerability of Australian ports like Sydney to long-range Japanese submarine patrols and the need for heightened security. Many Sydney-siders still recall the moments at night on 31 May – 1 June 1942 as the harbour lit up with depth charge explosions, tracer fire and criss-crossing harbour defence vessels. The explosion as a Japanese torpedo struck under the depot ferry HMAS Kuttabul was intense, throwing portions of the shattered hull high into the sky and killing twenty-one men.

The attack mirrored the earlier midget submarine operations at Pearl Harbor on 7 December 1941, and the raid on Diego-Suarez in Madagascar on 30 May 1942. The Sydney raid involved five large ocean-going submarines, I-22, I-24, I-27 with their three midget submarines, and I-21 and I-29 providing support. A sixth submarine I-28 intended for the raid was sunk by the US submarine USS Tautog before it could deploy with a fourth midget. The five remaining mother submarines, which had left Chuuk Lagoon in the Pacific Ocean, arranged themselves in a semi-circle centred on Sydney Heads. A previous flight on 29 May by a reconnaissance aircraft launched from I-21 spotted potential targets inside the harbour. This Glen-type twin-float seaplane capsized when returning to its submarine and was scuttled. The remains of the seaplane have not been located.

At approximately 8pm on the Sunday evening, the first midget (number 14 from I-27) commanded by Sub Lieutenant Chuman, motored submerged into the harbour. Unfortunately for its crew, the boat became fouled inside the still incomplete anti-submarine boom net laid across the harbour between Georges Head and Green Point near Watsons Bay. Observed by surface craft near the Western Gate, the two-man Japanese crew decided to commit suicide when escape was hopeless. They fired the forward internal scuttling charge about 10:30pm and totally destroyed the fore end of the submarine. Remains of the wreck and its crew were later recovered.

Midget A (according to the Allied order of identification) from I-24, commanded by Sub Lieutenant Ban with Petty Officer Ashibe, next entered the harbour and followed a Manly ferry through the boom defences. The exact serial number of this submarine has not been ascertained, but it is now often referred to as M24. The submarine crossed the Indicator Loop system at about 9:48 pm. In a cat-and-mouse play, the submarine manoeuvred around the harbour and was sighted several times around 11:00 pm. Under fire from the heavy cruiser USS Chicago and several motor launches, the submarine successfully fired its two torpedoes about 12:30am from near Bradleys Head. Both missed Chicago – the prime target – one running onto Garden Island and failing to explode. The other struck underneath the ferry HMAS Kuttabul after passing under the Dutch submarine K-IX at its berth. The explosion sank Kuttabul and killed 21 of those aboard. Ban's midget submarine never made it back to the planned rendezvous point immediately south of Port Hacking.

The third midget, Number 21 from I-22 commandeered by Lieutenant Matsuo, crept into the harbour, was sighted near the Heads, and was depth-charged, then laid low before making a belated entry around 3:00am when Chicago was leaving port, and then variously sighted in the vicinity of Bradleys Head and the Taronga Zoo. The midget was definitely seen in Taylors Bay by 5:00 am. The boat was attacked with depth charges from HMAS Seamist, Steady Hour and HMAS Yarroma until 8:30 am on 1 June and crippled. When recovered with its two live torpedoes and unexploded scuttling charges, the crew were found dead, having committed suicide. The remains of Midget 14 and 21 were recovered from the harbour within a week and subjected to military interrogation.

The Type A midget submarines were approximately 24 metres (79 ft) in length, carried two 18-inch torpedoes, and could remain submerged for about 12 hours. On display at the Australian War Memorial in Canberra is a composite craft made up of the remains of midget 14 and 21, while the remaining conning tower (from midget 21) is on display at the Royal Australian Navy Heritage Centre, Sydney. None of the five mother submarines survived wartime operations. I-22 and I-24 had launched their previous midget submarines during the Pearl Harbor attack of 1941.

=== M24 attack and escape ===
The midget from I-24 (also referred to in the initial Allied reports as "Midget A", and colloquially as M24), commanded by Sub Lieutenant Katsuhisa Ban with Petty Officer Mamoru Ashibe, entered the harbour, crossing the indicator loop at 9:48 pm. It apparently followed a Manly ferry also through the Eastern Channel gate in the boom. The submarine ran up the harbour unobserved for an hour until at 10:52 pm when it was spotted near the Garden Island Naval Base, across from the Sydney central business district. This sighting occurred just twenty minutes after Chuman and Ohmori in Ha-14 blew themselves up in the antisubmarine nets at the other end of the harbour. Military authorities finally started to appreciate the scale of the problem.

M24's conning tower had been sighted by one of its prime targets, the American heavy cruiser USS Chicago, and soon by the Dockyard Motor Boat Nestor. Now in a position 180 metres (200 yd) off Garden Island and apparently proceeding in a direction towards the Sydney Harbour Bridge, USS Chicago opened up with its five-inch guns and oerlikons. M24 was further attacked by HMAS Whyalla with its machine guns and HMAS Geelong from Bradleys Head. Recent research by historian Peter Grose indicates that one of Chicago's crew even emptied the magazine of his .45 automatic pistol at M24's conning tower.

The historical events have been well covered (e.g. Jenkins, 1992, Carruthers, 2006 and most recently by Grose, 2007), however it is still unclear why it took Ban and Ashibe another hour-and-a-half to run the 1,600 metres; 0.87 nautical miles (1 mi) from just west of Chicago to an attack position off its eastern-pointing stern.

Even allowing for the need to complete turns and circles, M24 had sufficient time to transit that limited distance, compared to the hour it had only taken to pass right up through the harbour. It is more surprising that Ban did not attempt to get into a more optimum firing position, immediately broadside of Chicago's hull. It now appears that Ban fired both his "fish" from a position astern of Chicago using the observed 60-degree deflection setting on his torpedoes – a tricky shot. This is possibly one reason why he missed. The unexplained time lapse and then apparently hurried attack may be explained by the fact that M24's crew rested on the seabed for some period prior to attacking their target, perhaps recovering from the earlier volley of fire.

It is confirmed that the submarine did successfully fire its two torpedoes about 12:30 am on 1 June from a position near the centre of the harbour abreast of Bradleys Head. The target was USS Chicago, still at its mooring at Man of War anchorage #2 and attempting to build steam to quit the harbour. The workers' lights on Garden Island were extinguished at about the same time Ban was taking his shots. Both missed Chicago, one running onto Garden Island and failing to explode amongst a pile of rope near the Gun Wharf. The other struck the island seawall under the ferry HMAS Kuttabul and exploded, sinking the vessel. The torpedo had first passed under the Dutch submarine K-IX at its berth alongside. K-IX was later wrecked in 1945 at Submarine Beach, Seal Rocks, and located in 1999 by the Heritage Branch via a remote magnetometer survey.

The sinking of Kuttabul killed 21 of those aboard, with ten others injured. Ban's midget submarine was never recovered by the mother submarines. What was later identified as an outer crossing on the harbour indicator loop at 01:58 am on 1 June has generally been regarded as M24 safely exiting Sydney Harbour. It was the only midget to successfully fire its two torpedoes and the only one of the three to escape. Again M24 took one-and-a-half hours to exit the harbour. This is compared to the hour that it took to enter and first be sighted in the vicinity of Chicago. M24 may have again rested inside the harbour for approximately half an hour after its failed attack.

=== Discovery ===
In November 2006 Sydney-based recreational scuba divers from a private group, No Frills Divers, located the remains of Ban and Ashibe's missing M24 midget submarine off Sydney's Northern Beaches. The wreck was found approximately 5 kilometres (2.7 nmi; 3.1 mi) offshore from Bungan Head near Newport in over fifty metres (one hundred and sixty feet) of water. Details of the discovery were broadcast on the Nine Network's 60 Minutes television program on 26 November 2006, and the announcement confirmed by the Minister for Planning, in conjunction with relevant Commonwealth government agencies on 1 December 2006.

Management

A No-entry Protected Zone was declared around the fragile wreck site on 1 December 2006 by the Federal Minister for the Environment, under the Commonwealth Historic Shipwrecks Act 1976. The No Entry zone has a radius of 500 metres (1,600 ft), the centre of which is at the intersection of 33°40′21″S 151°22′58″E in Australian waters. Entry to the zone is restricted to researchers and site managers while the archaeological survey work is completed. Permits are issued by the Heritage Branch of the NSW Office of Environment & Heritage or the Federal Minister for the Environment, Canberra.

The wreck was also initially subject to an Interim Heritage Order under Section 24 of the NSW (State) Heritage Act 1977. On 7 December 2007, the M24 wreck site and a zone with a radius of 500-metre (1,600 ft) was protected as an item of State Heritage significance on the New South Wales State Heritage Register. Penalties of up to AUS$1.1 million apply for disturbance of the wreck and surrounding debris field.

== Description ==
The Japanese Imperial Navy Type A midget submarines deployed at Sydney were approximately 24 metres (79 ft) in length, of 46–47 short tons (42–43 t), and carried two 46-centimetre (18 in) torpedoes (Type 97, oxygen-driven, Kure Naval Yard). With a two-man crew, contemporary assessments suggested that they could remain submerged for about 12 hours in most operating circumstances. After this time the crew would be forced to replenish air and stamina levels. The submarines were of single-hull design using welded 8 millimetres (0.31 in) cold-rolled steel plates (MS44 quality, 5/16th inch), with a normal diving depth of up to 100 metres (330 ft) and a collapse depth of 200 metres (660 ft). Powered by a 450 kilowatts (600 hp) electric motor, the boats could not recharge their initial battery capacity and therefore were totally reliant on the initial charge, careful management of the power reserve, and any technical breakdown or event that might impact the battery-operated electrical circuits. The design achieved an impressive surface speed, reportedly up to 24 knots (44 km/h) on the surface and 19 knots (35 km/h) submerged, far greater than other midget designs of World War II.

The Sydney boats had some design modifications compared to those captured at Pearl Harbor, with a slightly wider hull at 1.8-metre (6 ft). The vessels were electrically powered by 208 lead-acid wet-cell batteries (72 forward and 136 aft), and had three main sections joined by internal flanges, bolted together. These comprised the Forward Section (containing the torpedo tubes), the Central Section (containing the Forward Battery Room, Conning Tower and Aft Battery Room), and the Aft Section (containing the motor, propeller shaft and gearing). Other improvements included an improved gyro compass, an accessway hatch on the underside to permit crew transfers at sea, and an eyepiece fitted into the side of the Conning Tower. Other fundamental additions included the fitting of an improved nose guard and propeller guard, and the distinctive net cutters at bow and atop the Conning Tower.

The type was designed in Japan during the 1930s, with two experimental boats Ha-1 and Ha-2 built as early as 1936. The building program accelerated from 1938 onwards, when some fifty Type A boats were built at Ourazaki and Kure naval yards, the majority between 1940–2 (number sequence Ha-3 to Ha-52). The class was known by many secret names, the most commonly ascribed being "Ko-Hyoteki" or "Target A", with the Sydney boats being an improved version, Type A Kai 1 (improved version 1). Records of production are limited and total production numbers are variously reported, with some for example quoting 59 Type As produced. The Japanese designed several variants to the Type A midget during the war, including the important Hei Gata (Type C) and the most prolific Koryu (Type D), fitted with generators to allow battery recharge and additional crew.

Japanese midget submarines had their own numeric designation based on production sequences (a "Ha" number reference is often used today). They could be deployed on any of the mother carrier submarines fitted for them and therefore their identification number was often different from the I-class submarine carrier.

=== Midget submarine dimensions ===
| Unit of measure | Measurement |
|---|---|
| Weight | 46 tonnes (51 short tons) |
| Length | 23.9 metres (78 feet) |
| Forward section | 5.2 metres (17 feet) |
| Midship section | 10.64 metres (34 feet 11 inches) |
| Aft section | 6.81 metres (22 feet 4 inches) |
| Nose guard | 0.91 metres (3 feet) |
| Diameter amidships | 1.8 metres (6 feet) |
| Height of conning tower | 1.37 metres (4 feet 6 inches) with additional guard structures 380 millimetres (15 in) high. |
| Beam | 1.8 metres (5 ft 11 in) |
| Electrically propelled | 1 x 450 kilowatts (600 horsepower) |
| Maximum surface speed | 43 kilometres per hour (23 knots) |
| Maximum submerged speed | 35 kilometres per hour (19 knots) |
| Propulsion | 1 shaft but fitted with contra-rotating propellers. |
| Range | Approximately 24 kilometres (15 miles) at full speed; or 130 kilometres (80 mi) at 3.7 kilometres per hour (2 knots); and without any self-recharging capability for the batteries. Each boat carried 2 x 45-centimetre (17.7 in) Model 2 torpedoes with a range of 3,000 metres (9,800 ft) at 74 kilometres per hour (40 kn). |
| Crew | Two |
| Equipment | Radio set with a raiseable mast. Electrically raised periscope. Echo sounder. |
| Torpedoes | 46 centimetres (18 in) with a 173-centimetre-long (5 ft 8 in) warhead and 44 centimetres (17.5 in) in diameter. |

=== Crew of M24 ===
The crew of the midget submarine at the time of the operation were:

- Sub Lt. Katsuhisa Ban
- Petty Officer Mamoru Ashibe

=== Condition ===
As of 19 February 2008, the M24 was generally in reasonable condition, however the external fabric has been damaged by commercial fishing trawling operations.

The wreck lies upright on sand, just under half-buried in the sediment. It appears that the bow is slightly elevated as the lower torpedo tube is approximately a third filled at sand level. Both tubes are empty of their torpedoes, confirming the identification of the vessel as M24, the only midget to successfully fire its two torpedoes. The upper tube has been torn off the vessel back to a substantial bulkhead and lies almost totally buried in sand adjacent to the bow on the port quarter. At the stern, sand levels lie at the centreline of the propeller boss (missing). Both contra-rotating propellers are visible, although all exposed rudders, stabilisers and the protective cage around the propellers have been torn off by fishing nets. Just forward of the stern, the topside manhole that gave access to the motor room appears lost to corrosion, creating a minor cavity in the hull plating.

The internal hull aft of the control room is over half-filled with sand, as evidenced through several significant openings in the pressure hull. These openings extend around the hull immediately aft of the rear control room bulkhead and beyond the conning tower area (see below). They extend from sand level to the roof, with corrosion processes resulting in plate loss back to internal transverse frames. The openings allow water movements through this aft battery room and tend to "self-flush" this major compartment, keeping sand levels down. Several fittings and fixtures that adorn the aft battery room are visible through these openings.

Significantly, the control room compartment is partly filled with sand up to the original internal casing roof. This sand has apparently entered the space as a result of significant damage to the upper conning tower structure and the aft battery room openings, mentioned above. Externally, all plating that comprised the conning tower has been removed from the hull, including the forward access chute into the control room. This once formed part of the pressure hull, and its removal has formed an artificial opening into the main hull atop the submarine. Only the pressure dome and periscope standard of the aft portion of the conning tower survives intact, however the damage has created an opening of approximately 50 centimetres (20 in) in diameter.

Drifting sand has probably entered the control room space partly through this opening, and apparently to the same depth as observed in the aft battery room. When the No Frills Divers video footage of the wreck was first examined, there was an indication that the rear bulkhead door into the control room was closed. This led to speculation that both fore and aft doors were probably closed to enable sand accumulation and retention within the control room space. However, the current surveys have suggested that the aft door to the control room is in fact open, though significantly sanded up. It is likely that the forward control room bulkhead door is closed to assist sand build up. If future examination shows this is not the case, the forward battery room and perhaps the torpedo room, must also have significant introduced sand deposits.

Inside the periscope well, the upper portion of the periscope tube is visible transiting into the control room sand deposit. The periscope does not extend externally beyond the periscope standard, suggesting that it has retracted into the periscope well built into the floor of the control room. At no point could the upper lens of the periscope be sighted within the outside opening of the periscope standard.

Around the internal upper walls of the control room are several gauges and levers that comprise part of the operating controls of the submarine. Of particular interest are the steps built into the forward face of the periscope well that allowed crew egress and ingress, and the clearly visible retractable two-step crew ladder hinged at the weld joint of the periscope dome and the ceiling of the pressure hull. This ladder is still in its upright or stowed position, once within the cavity of the 1.5-metre-deep access chute, now lost. This is the firmest indication that the crew of M24 are most probably still within the submarine hull. To exit the craft, Ban and Ashibe would have had to pull down this hinged ladder to climb up and out of the Control Room.

The original signature of the external conning tower plating is clearly visible on the upper surfaces of the wreck, marked by the angle iron framework where it was attached to the casing.

Some elements of the conning tower still survive in the debris field that surrounds the wreck. Almost incredibly, the watertight hatch that once sealed the access chute lies beside the conning tower on sand to port. Once upright, the lid has been turned over by divers to reveal its underside and locking mechanism, which appears to be in the locked position. While there is no sign of the access chute itself (part of the original pressure hull), the net cutter that once adorned the forward conning tower, with its distinctive teeth, lies separated on the sand, also on the port side, slightly abaft the conning tower. Resting against the submarine hull, its wishbone attachment frame is clearly visible.

The main hull forward is mostly intact, and unlike the stern, provides no visual access into either the forward battery room or torpedo room. Apart from some abrasion to the upper hull surfaces caused by fishing nets, and perhaps some modern impact by an anchor or some other foreign object, there is no significant damage to the casing. Hence it is impossible to postulate the condition of their internal spaces, including the presence of sand or relics.

Like the conning tower, the forward bow area has witnessed significant physical damage. As noted, the upper of two torpedo tubes has been almost half torn off the hull and now lies in the sand to port. The main bulkhead (at frame 7) is clearly exposed, while the lower tube is completely intact to the bow. Running along the forward centreline of the casing, the original hydraulic line that extended to the bow torpedo cap release has been torn off and lies across the hull to port. Most of the front end of the submarine is still concealed by entrapped fishing nets that make inspection difficult. What is clear is that the protective cage around the torpedo tubes has been stripped from the hull, including the forward net-cutting gear and serrated jump cable that ran back to the conning tower. It is possible that some of these elements might be detected with a fuller examination of the major debris field that extends out from the bow of the wreck for some one hundred meters.

The initial archaeological survey taskings have indicated that no scuttling charges have been fired by the crew, nor that there is any obvious battle damage to the hull. The M24 wreck site has retained a significant level of intactness despite being located underwater for 65 years. The hull has suffered some damage from contact with commercial fishing nets.

=== Modifications and dates ===
The date of construction is not known although one of the midgets recovered from the Sydney Harbour raid was reported to have been built in 1942.

On 7 February 2007, during JMSDF Admiral Eiji Yoshikawa's visit to Australia, Yoshikawa and RAN Vice Admiral Russ Shalders presided over a ceremony held aboard HMAS Newcastle to honour M24's crew. Relatives of the midget submarines' crews, one of the survivors from Kuttabul, and dignitaries and military personnel from Australia and Japan attended another ceremony on 6 August 2007 at HMAS Kuttabul. HMAS Melbourne then carried relatives of M24's crew to the wreck site, where they poured sake into the sea before being presented with sand taken from the seabed around the submarine.

In May 2012, the NSW state government announced that, with the approval of the Japanese government and the submariners' families, divers would be allowed to observe the M24 wreck for a short period of time. Divers would enter a ballot for places on controlled dives run on several days. If successful, opening the site would become an annual event to commemorate the attack.

== Heritage listing ==
The M24 is of heritage significance to Australia and Japan, and is the only Japanese midget submarine wreck located in Australian waters (the remains of two others from the Sydney attack having been recovered). The site is the only in situ-identified cultural relic of the attack on Sydney Harbour in 1942. A complacent Sydney population awoke to the realities of war due to this attack, and the event is strongly remembered today through the wider community. The M24 wreck is representative of Japanese submarine operations off Australia's eastern seaboard during the war and a direct physical reminder of the conflict at Sydney. Internationally, it represents one of only a handful of Japanese midget submarine wreck sites located in their underwater contexts. Remains of a further six are retained as museum or outdoor exhibits. The archaeological site is therefore of considerable importance in the comparative analysis of midget submarines wrecks discovered worldwide. The site also has the ability to contribute generally to studies of submarines as a specialised class of archaeological site type. Only limited archival information related to these vessels survives and therefore the archaeological record is of added importance. In regard to the three submarines that attacked Sydney Harbour, M24 is the only one retained in its original battle context and undisturbed, apart from the obvious effects of net entrapment and corrosion activity.

M24 Japanese Midget Submarine wreck site was listed on the New South Wales State Heritage Register on 7 December 2007, having satisfied the following criteria.

The place is important in demonstrating the course, or pattern, of cultural or natural history in New South Wales.

The Japanese submarine attack on Sydney Harbour was part of a series of pivotal aggressive moves by Japan during the early stages of World War II, and closely followed the attack at Pearl Harbor, Hawai'i just six months prior. The sizeable Japanese naval force of eight submarines comprised the first active attack on Sydney in its history. While the raid was militarily of limited success, it highlighted the vulnerability of important Allied naval station and repair facilities, and ships, to long-range submarine attack. The loss of 21 naval ratings aboard the depot ship HMAS Kuttabul to one of M24's torpedoes is still remembered by the navy through the annual HMAS Kuttabul Memorial Service held at Garden Island Naval Base. The raid awoke a complacent Sydney population to the realities of war. The sale of artefacts from and regional tours of one of the captured midget submarines played a major role in raising awareness and in generating financial contributions to the War Bonds Scheme.

The place has a strong or special association with a person, or group of persons, of importance of cultural or natural history of New South Wales's history.

The M24 was the only Japanese midget submarine to successfully enter Sydney Harbour, fire its torpedoes and escape. The other two boats, Ha-14 and Ha-21 were disabled in the conflict and later recovered. The final fate of M24 and its brave crew of Sub Lieutenant Ban and Petty Officer Ashibe became one of Australia's enduring naval mysteries until the site was discovered by recreational divers in November 2006.

The place is important in demonstrating aesthetic characteristics and/or a high degree of creative or technical achievement in New South Wales.

The M24 wreck site provides an opportunity to document and analyse the form, fit-out and construction of a Japanese Type A midget submarine from World War II. The archaeological record is of added importance with a limited number of archival references relative to this type of vessel. Aesthetically the M24 represents a rare opportunity to see a historically significant submarine wreck site in its underwater setting, providing scope for world-class photographic documentation and potential controlled visitation by the recreational community.

The place has a strong or special association with a particular community or cultural group in New South Wales for social, cultural or spiritual reasons.

The attack awoke a relatively complacent Sydney wartime population to the realities of the present conflict. The raid, which included eight Japanese submarines and over 500 Japanese Imperial Navy sailors, was the only direct attack on Sydney in its history. The event is well-remembered by the population nationally. In Sydney, the event is particularly closely felt because so much of the present population were witnesses to the raid. Such was the impact on Sydney that many school children and even whole families temporarily relocated from Sydney to places such as the Blue Mountains and beyond, fearing another attack, more coastal shelling, or even invasion.

The place has potential to yield information that will contribute to an understanding of the cultural or natural history of New South Wales.

The M24 is the largest surviving archaeological relic in situ from the Japanese attack on Sydney Harbour on 31 May 1942. The M24 hull and associated relics have been retained in their archaeological context and unaltered, apart from damage by fishing net hook-ups. The site and artefacts have the potential to contribute to technical studies of the construction, fit-out and materials used in Japanese midget submarines of World War II. The site has potential to contribute to studies of corrosion activity of steel shipwrecks in coastal marine environments, and the effects of localised environmental factors. The archaeological site is of added value to researchers as a storehouse of information that is not available through the scant archival records that survive for this class of vessel.

The place possesses uncommon, rare or endangered aspects of the cultural or natural history of New South Wales.

The M24 represents the only Type A Imperial Japanese midget submarine located in its original underwater context in Australian territorial waters. The partial remains of only two other examples survive in museum displays within Australia, which have been substantially stripped of fittings and fixtures. The M24 is one of five midget submarine wrecks located underwater internationally and six on museum display.

The place is important in demonstrating the principal characteristics of a class of cultural or natural places/environments in New South Wales.

The wreck site is a representative example of the Type A Japanese midget submarines deployed in the first stages of World War II. The type saw action throughout the war but was superseded by later variants. As an example of the boats deployed in major war theatres such as Pearl Harbor, Sydney and Madagascar, the M24 wreck has the potential to document the main attributes of the class and various design additions.

== See also ==
- Attack on Sydney Harbour
- Military history of Australia during World War II
