= Thukkachi Abatsahayesvar Temple =

Shiva temple in Tamil Nadu, India

Coordinates: 10.927045°N 79.482687°E

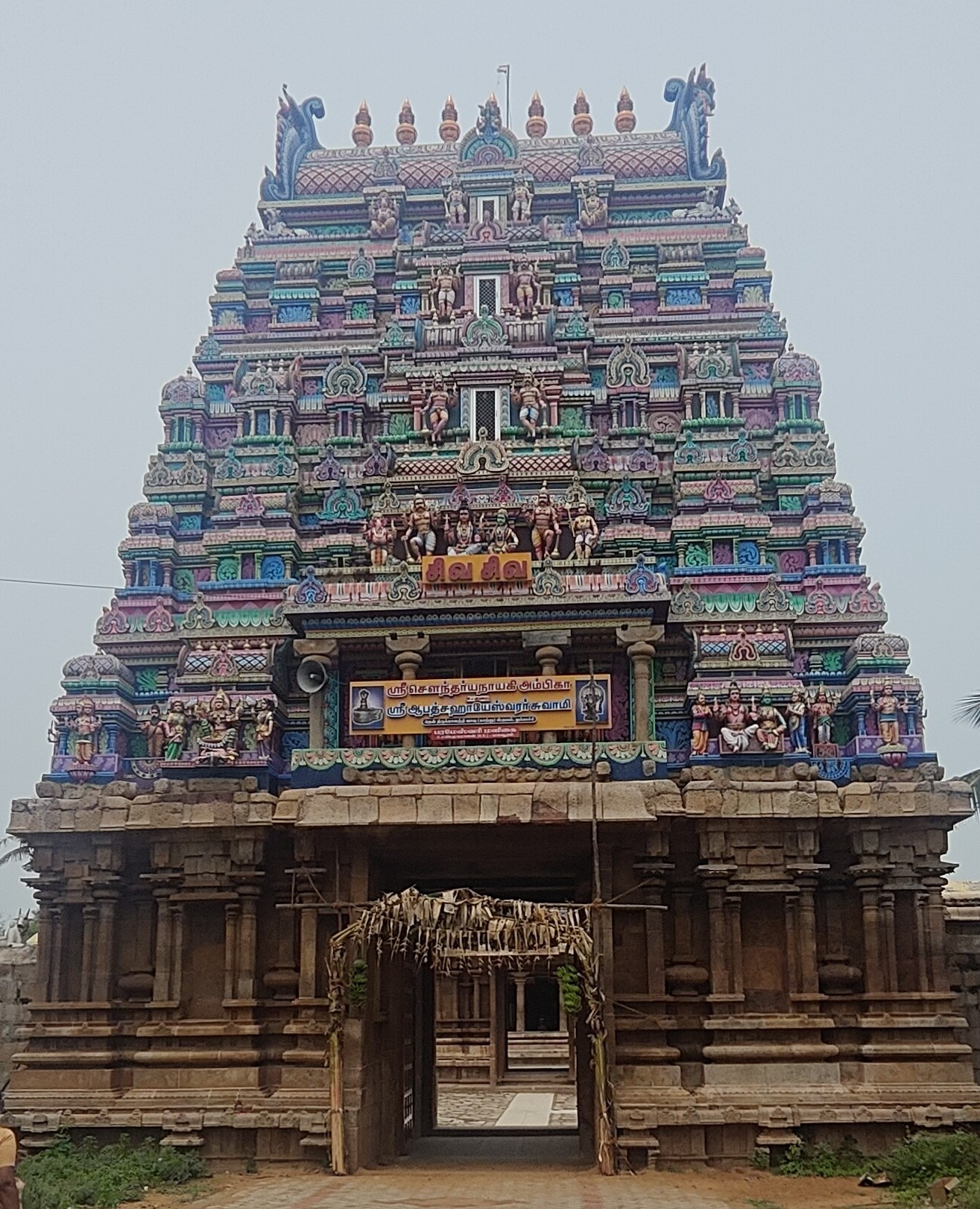

Religion
- Affiliation: Hinduism
- District: Thanjavur
- Deity: Lord Shiva

Location
- Location: Thukkachi village, on the banks of the Arasalar River
- State: Tamil Nadu
- Country: India
- Interactive map of Thukkachi Abatsahayesvar Temple

Thukkachi Abatsahayesvar temple (also known as Sri Abathsahayeswarar Sowndaranayaki Ambal temple) is a Shiva temple in Thukkachi village near Kumbakonam in Tamil Nadu, India.

== History ==
The temple is in Thukkachi village, on the banks of the Arasalar River, 16 kilometres (9.9 mi) east of Kumbakonam. The village derives its name from Durga Achi, after the goddess Durga seen in the temple, which over time got corrupted to become Thukkachi. The original temple was built by Rajendra Chola I (ruled between 1014 and 1044 CE). Legend says that Vikrama Chola suffered from vitiligo and visited many temples to pray for respite from the disease. Lord Abathsahayeswarar (Shiva) visited him in his dream when he was camping near Thukkachi, and asked him to worship him for 48 days. The king was completely cured in due course and subsequently ordered the expansion of the temple. The temple is also known as Southern Kalahasti after the temple town of Srikalahasti in Andhra Pradesh.

== Structure ==
The presiding deity of the temple is known as Abathsahayeswarar (Shiva) who faces east. His consort is Sowndaranayaki Ambal (Durga) who has a separate niche and faces south, unlike in other Shiva temples where she faces north. The other deities in the temple include Sarabeshwarar, Varahi, Jestadevi, Saptamatas, Dakshinamurthy, Vinayaka, Subramaniar with his consorts Valli and Devasena, Mahalakshmi, Lingotbhavar and Kuberar.A small shrine of Chandikesvara is also present, facing north. The temple is famous for its sculptural and architectural beauty. It once had seven Prakaras but currently only has three. The Sarabeshwarar shrine of the temple is considered to be the first of the three Sarabeshwarar temples built in the temple town of Kumbakonam. The Vimana of the presiding deity's shrine is similar to the one at Darasuram Iravatesvara temple.

== Renovation ==
In 2015, on the advice of the state government, work began on renovating the temple, which had been left in disrepair. The Indian government contributed 5.5 million rupees, while devotees have also contributed to the ongoing restoration efforts. The Kumbhabhishekham of the temple was held on 3 September 2023. As the renovation was carried out in new technology, without affecting its traditional beauty it got the UNESCO award.

== Photogallery ==
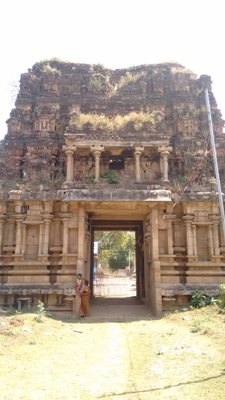
Rajagopuram

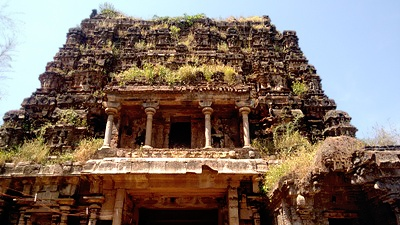
Rajagopuram,another view

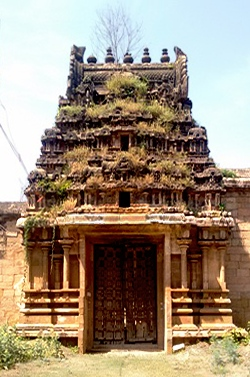
Inner gopuram

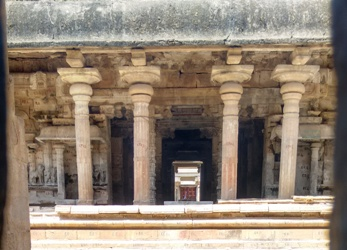
Front Mandapa

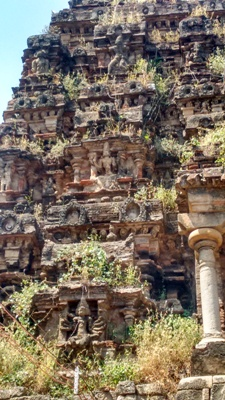
Sculptures in right side of gopuram

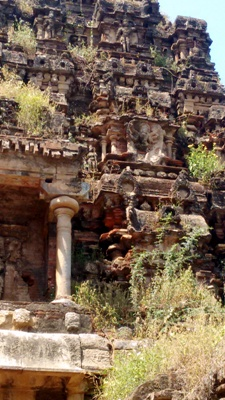
Sculptures in left side of gopuram

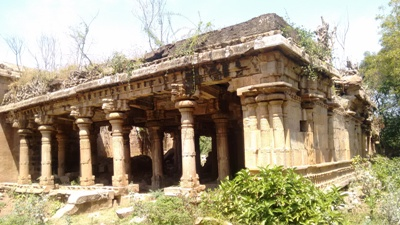
The mandapa, next to Rajagopuram

== After renovation ==
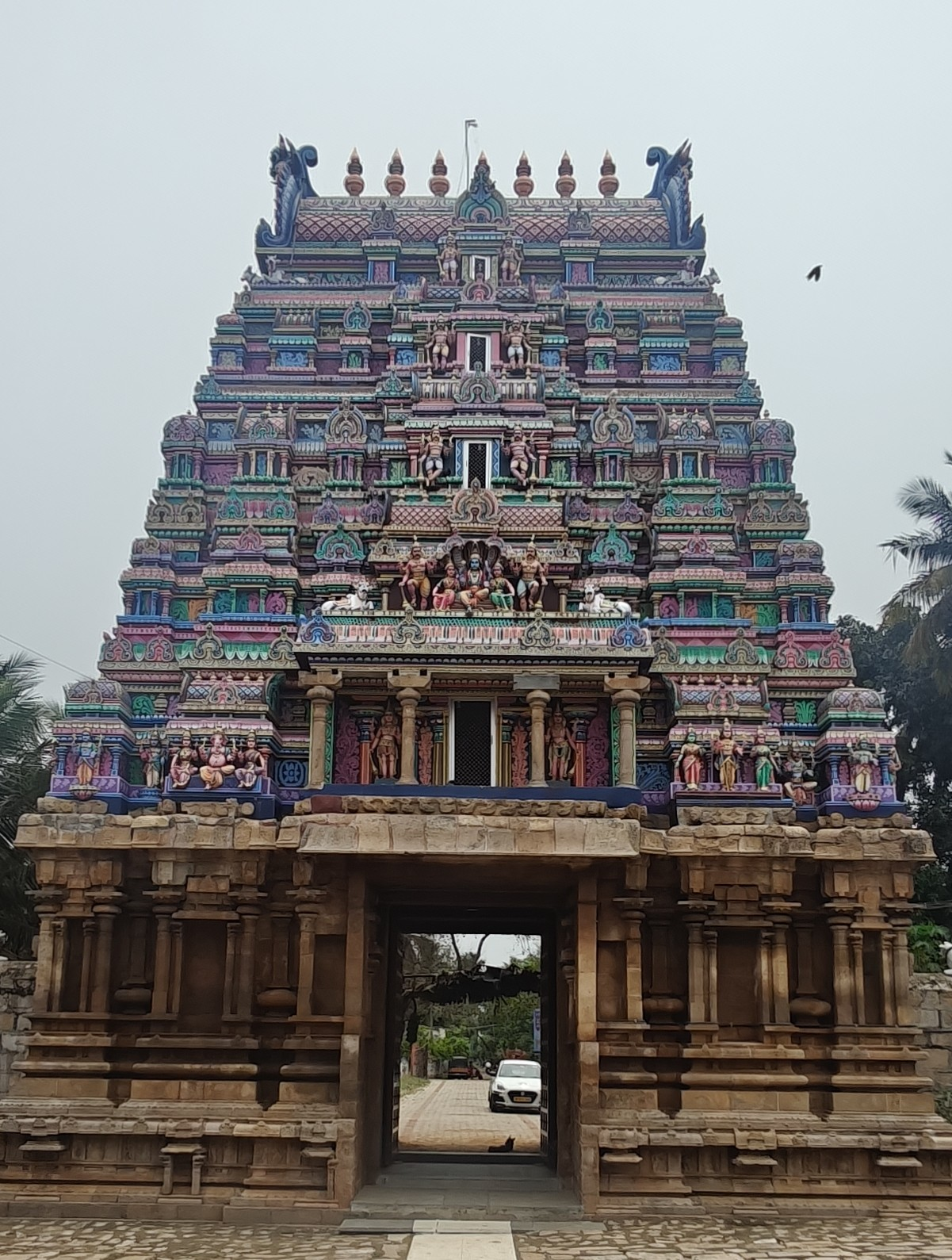
View of Rajagopuram from inside

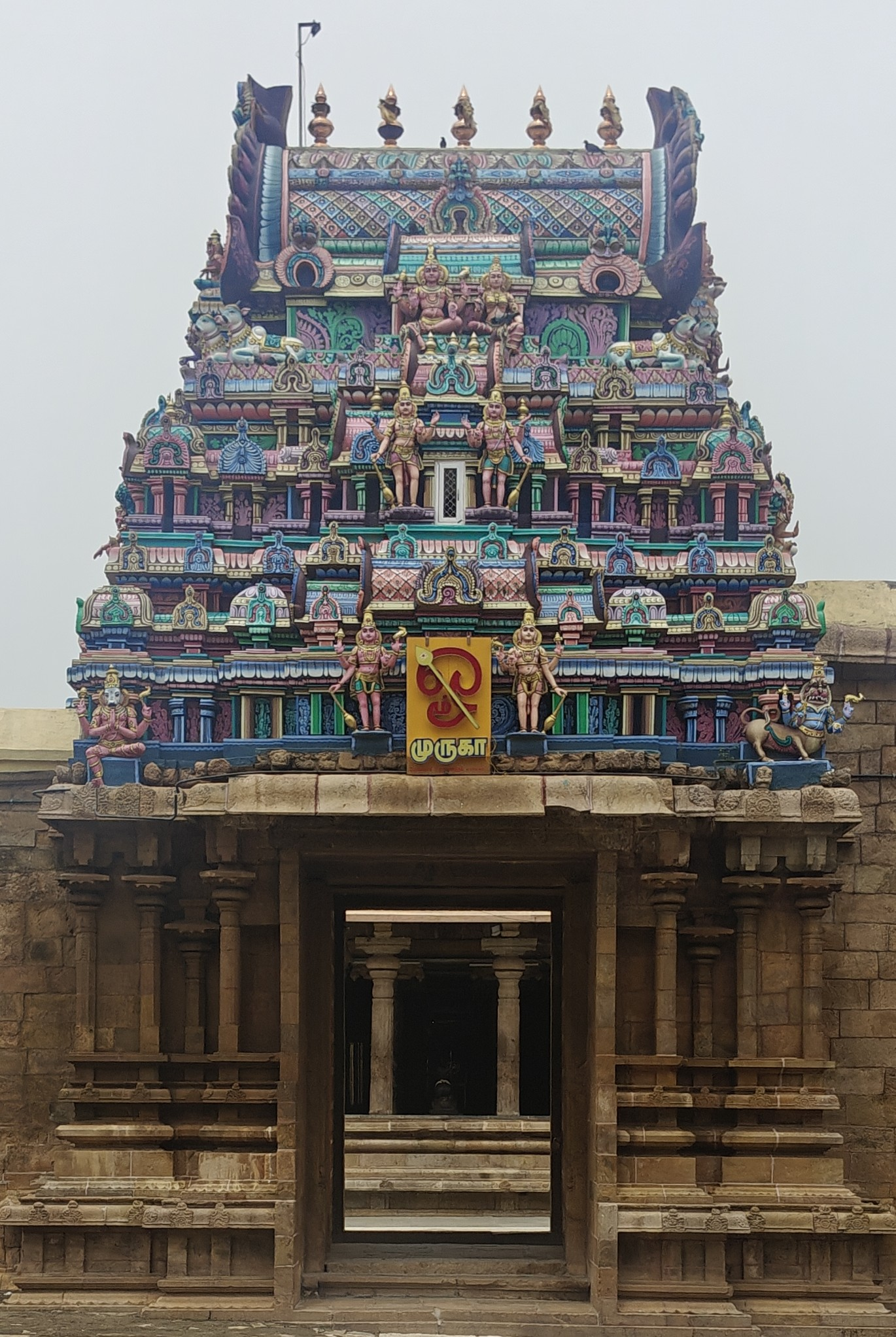
Inner gopuram

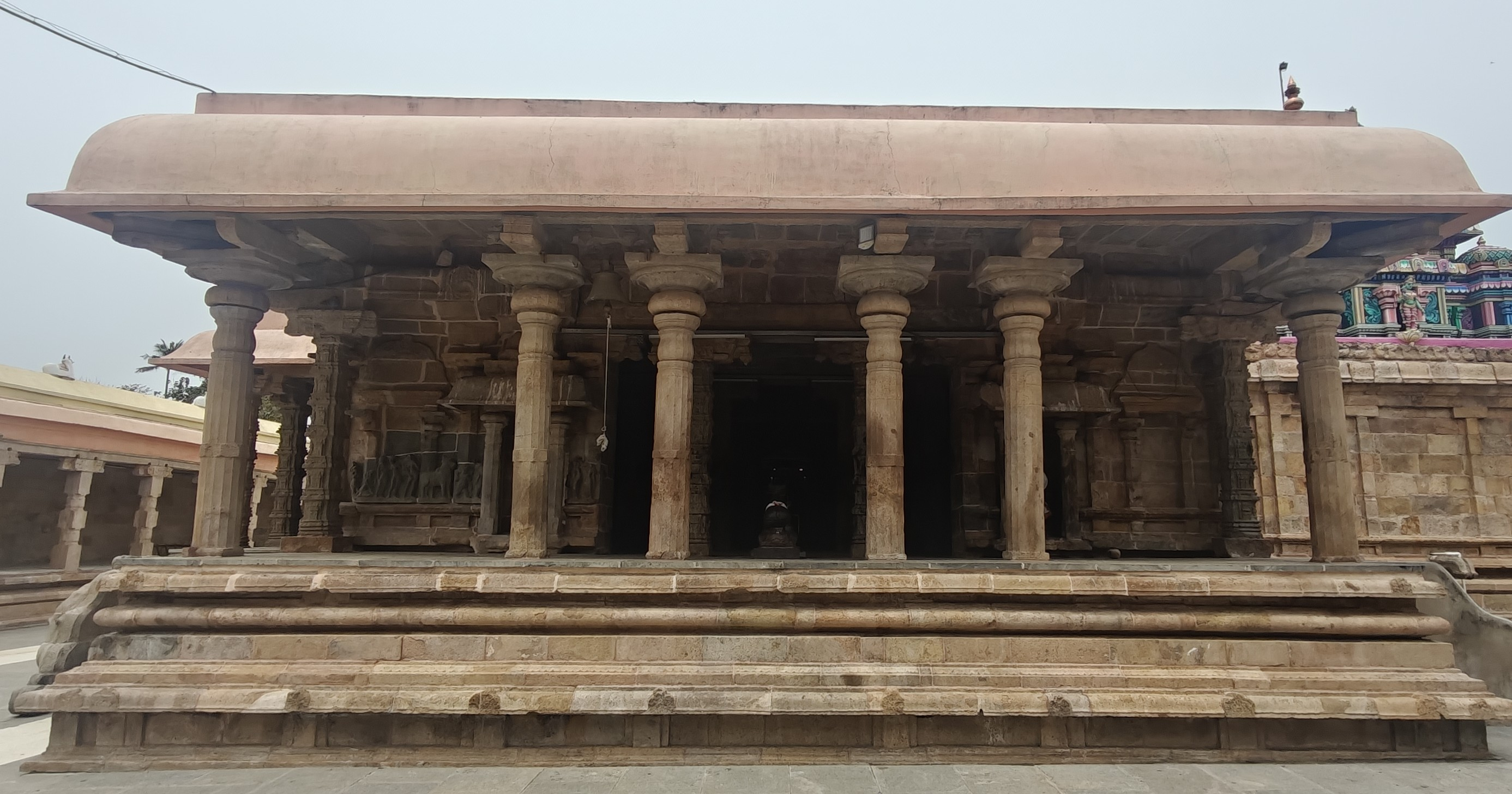
Front Mandapa

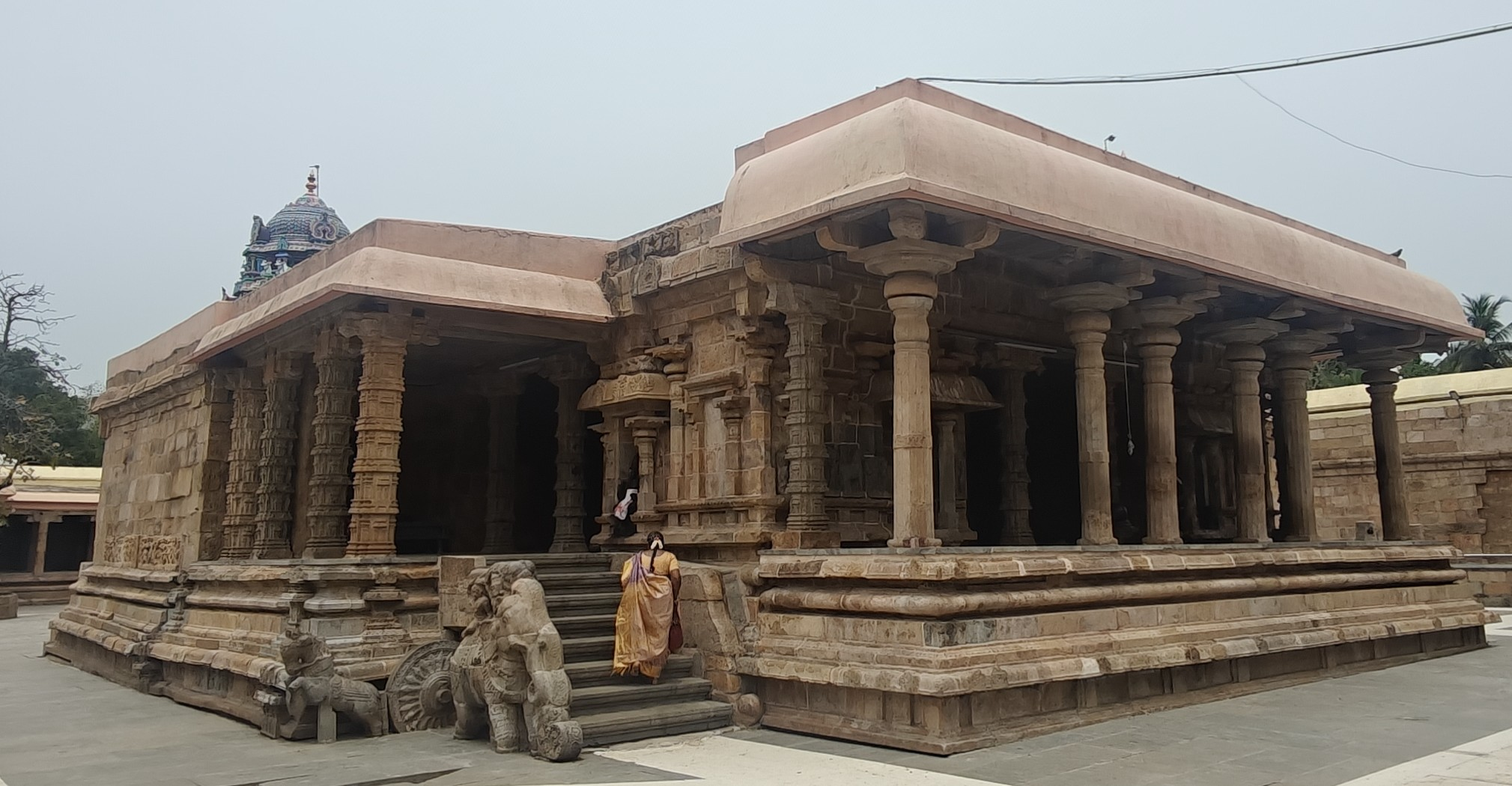
Front Mandapa, side view

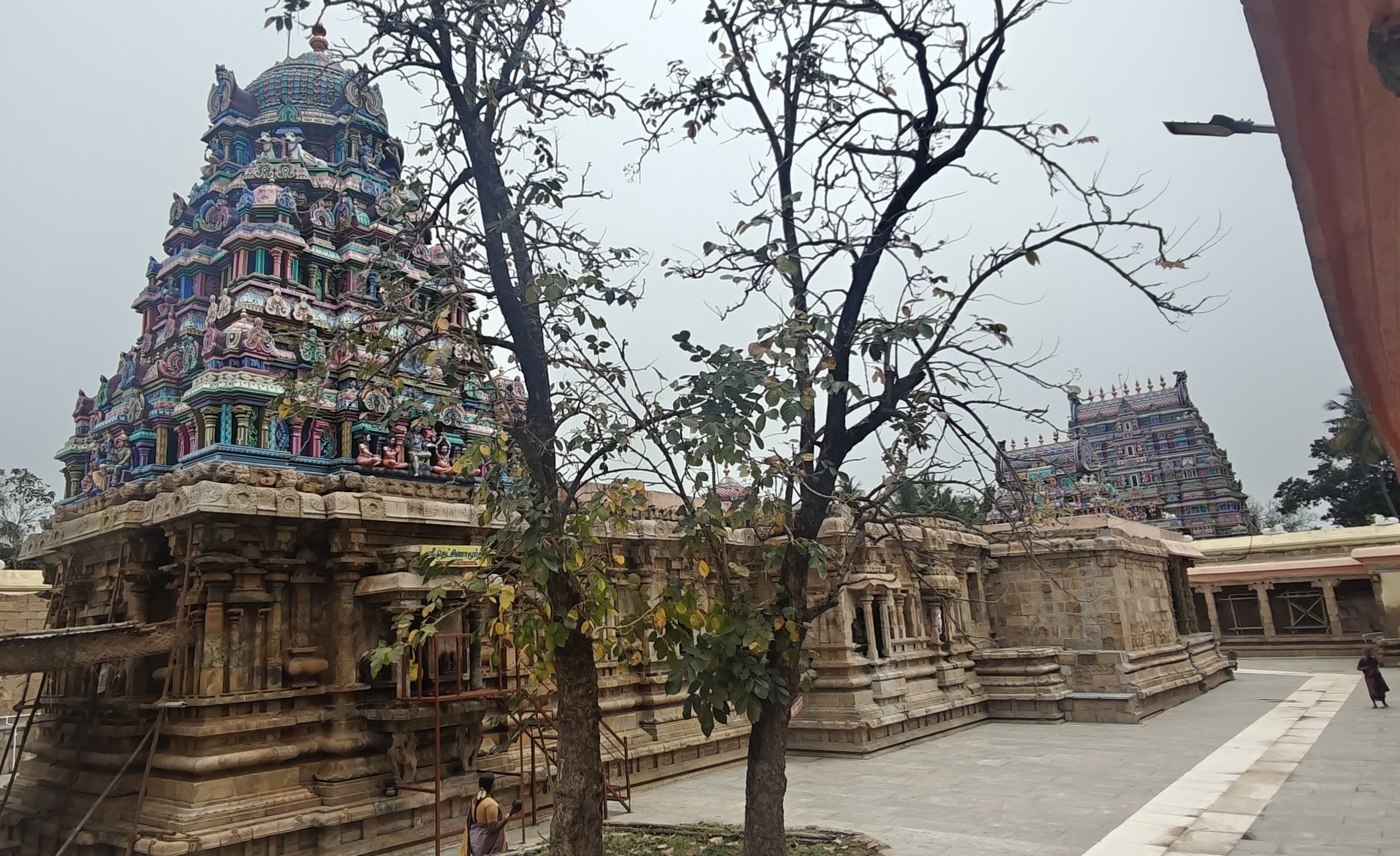
Prakaram, rightside

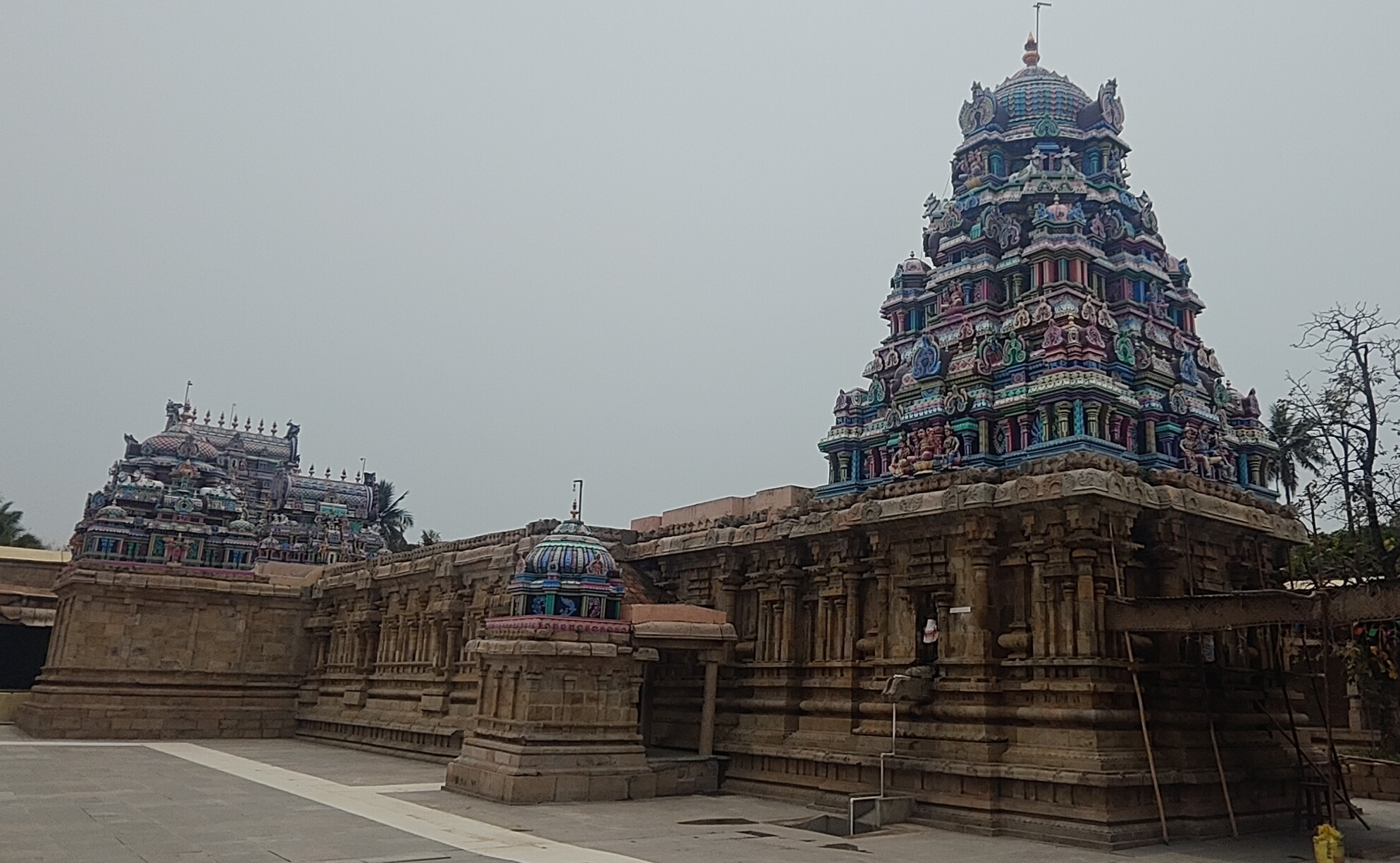
Prakaram, left side

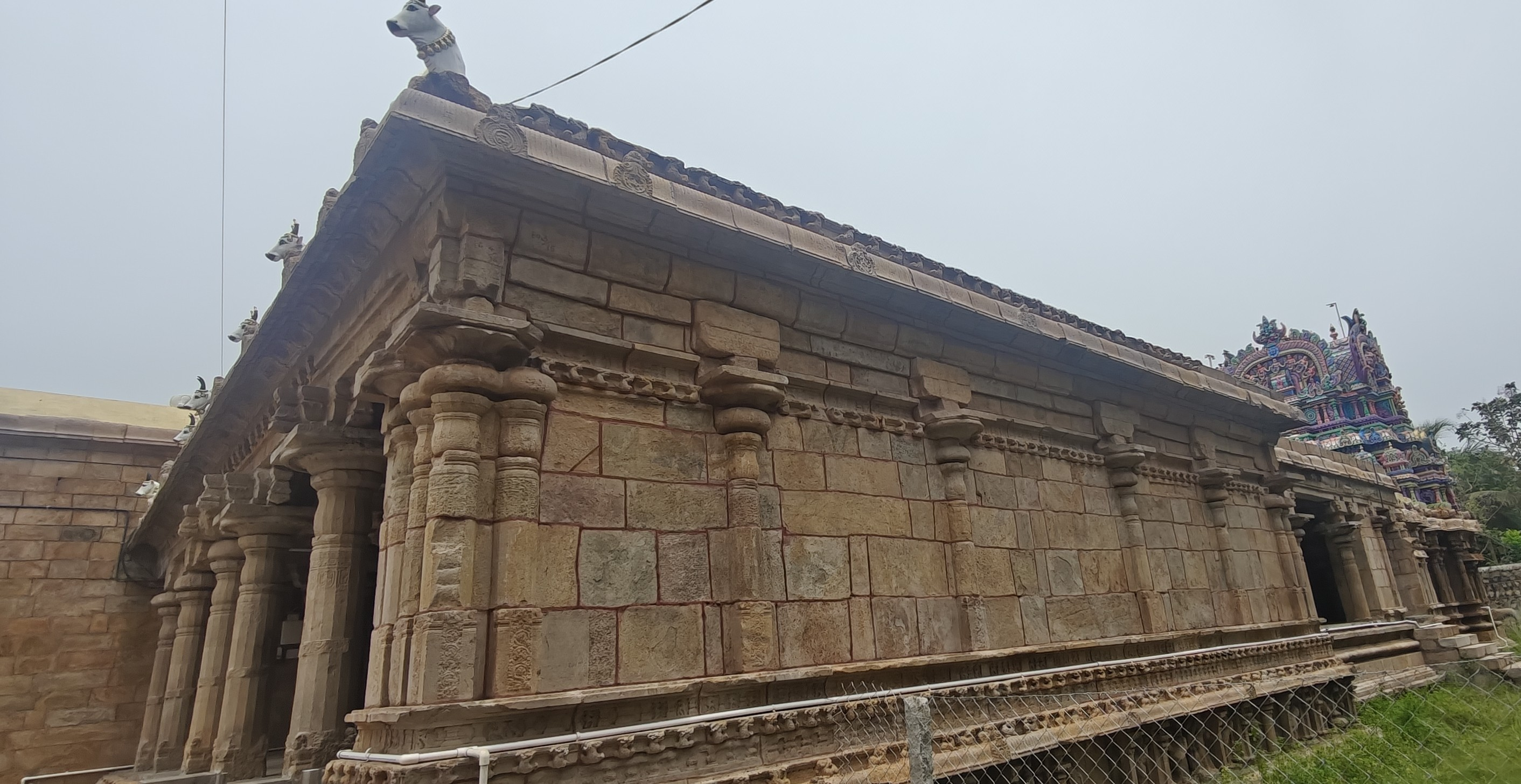
The mandapa, next to Rajagopuram
