= Khizerabad =

Khizerabad (Urdu: خضر آباد) is the first village in Hunza District of Gilgit-Baltistan, Pakistan.

== See also ==
- Former State of Hunza
- Baltit Fort
- Altit Fort
- Northern Areas
- Karakoram Highway
- Karakoram Mountains
- Nagar Valley
- Burusho
- Ganish Village
- Hunza Valley
- Karimabad
- Aliabad
- Nasirabad
- Ahmedabad
- Hussainabad
- Murtazaabad
- Sikandarabad
- Jafarabad
- Hunza–Nagar District
