= Jafarabad, Hunza =

Town in Nagar District Pakistan

Jafarabad (Urdu: جعفر آباد) is a town located in the Nagar District of Gilgit-Baltistan, Pakistan.

== See also ==
- Former State of Hunza
- Baltit Fort
- Altit Fort
- Northern Areas
- Karakoram Highway
- Karakoram Mountains
- Nagar Valley
- Burusho
- Ganish Village
- Hunza Valley
- Karimabad
- Khizerabad
- Aliabad
- Nasirabad
- Hussainabad
- Murtazaabad
- Ahmedabad
- Sikandarabad
- Hunza–Nagar District
