= Ahmedabad (Hunza) =

Village in Gilgit Baltistan, Pakistan

Coordinates: 36.3040°N 74.7305°E

Ahmedabad (Urdu: احمد آباد), is a village in the Hunza valley of the Gilgit Baltistan province of Pakistan with a population of approximately 1500. Old Name of Ahmedabad is "Thani Das"

== People ==
Ahmedabad's total population is approx 1500 and the literacy rate is 98%. Income of people was mainly from agriculture but now people have moved to big cities in the country and abroad. Most people of Ahmedabad are financially stable.

== Hydroelectric power station ==
The village has a total of two power stations which produce a combined 800 kW of electricity, enough to cover energy demands in Ahmedabad, Altit, Faizabad and Salmanabad; The first power plant project was completed in July 2008 and was inaugurated by, Federal Minister for Finance at that time. The second hydroelectricity power plant was constructed and inaugurated in 2015. The people of Ahmedabad have shares in the power projects, meaning that when it generates profit each shareholder will get his share in the profit.

== Education ==
There is one school, Diamond Jubilee community based (D.J.C.B.) High School. This school was in the past until 8th standard, meaning students had to travel to neighboring villages for further education. The people of Ahmedabad decided to extend the school's capacity to matriculation level and they did so but on their own. In the recent past the community of Ahmedabad has started an Early childhood development school system to improve the standard of education.

== See also ==
- Former State of Hunza
- Baltit Fort
- Altit Fort
- Northern Areas
- Karakoram Highway
- Karakoram Mountains
- Nagar Valley
- Burusho
- Ganish Village
- Hunza Valley
- Karimabad
- Khizerabad
- Aliabad
- Nasirabad
- Hussainabad
- Murtazaabad
- Sikandarabad
- Jafarabad
- Hunza–Nagar District
