= Aliabad, Hunza =

Town in Gilgit–Baltistan

Aliabad علی آباد
- Town
- Aliabad
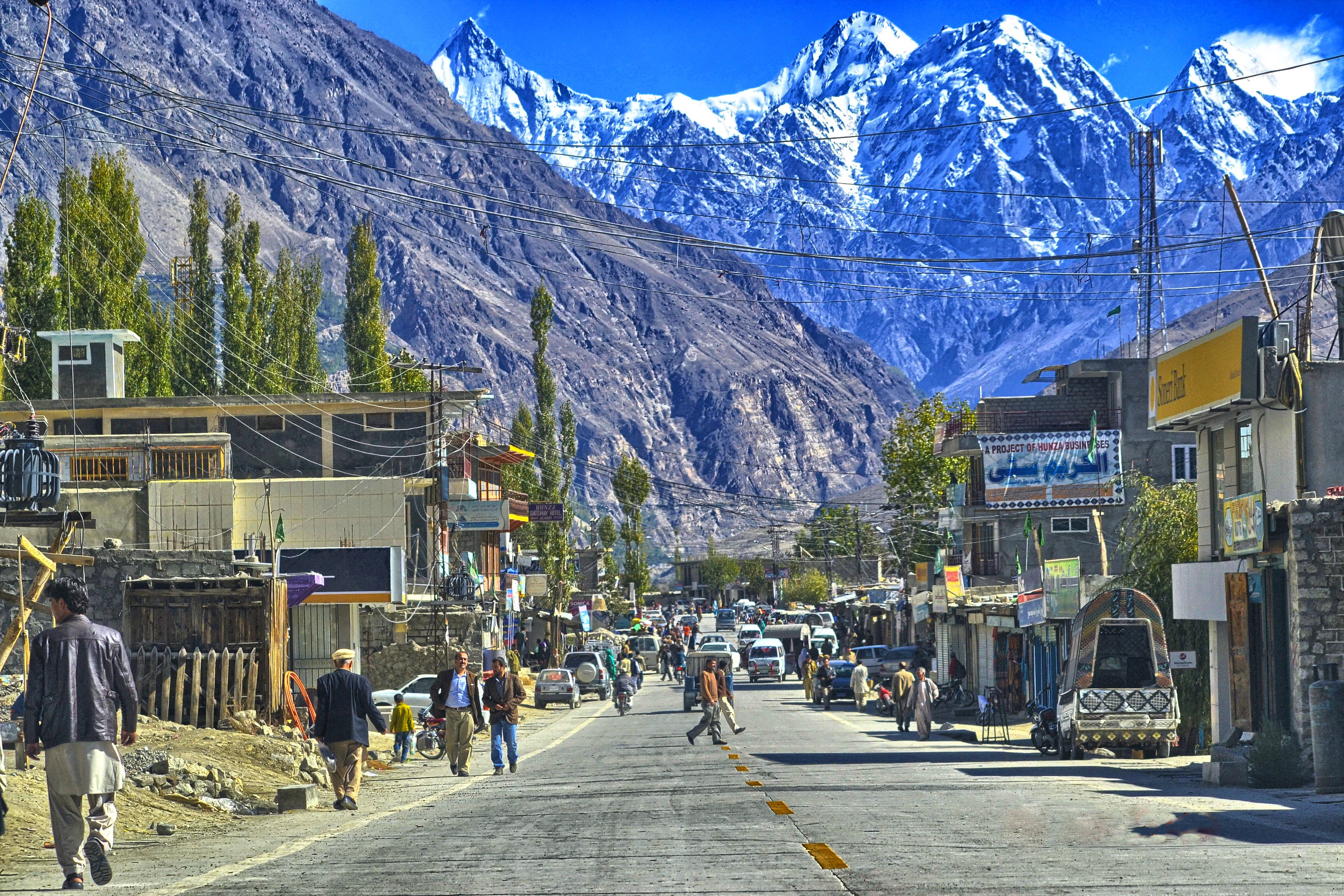
- A view of Aliabad (2013)
- Interactive map of Aliabad
- Location within Gilgit Baltistan Location within Pakistan
- Coordinates: 36°18′43″N 74°37′4″E
- Country: Pakistan
- Province: Gilgit–Baltistan
- District: Hunza
- Elevation: 2,206 m (7,238 ft)
- Time zone: UTC+5 (PST)
- Climate: BWk

Aliabad (Burushaski/Urdu: علی آباد) is the administrative and commercial center of the Hunza District in Gilgit–Baltistan region of Pakistan.

== Location ==
The town is located in a relatively wide section of the Hunza Valley, in the northeastern corner of the Karakoram range, between two forks of the Hunza River. In May 2010 government officials warned that the nearby Attabad lake, created in January that year by a significant landslide impounding the Hunza River, was close to flooding the area.

Like most localities in Hunza, Aliabad lies along the Karakoram Highway, which crosses this mountainous district. The town serves as a key transit hub connecting several regions, including Nagar and Gojal. It is also a major transportation center, with multiple bus companies operating routes between Hunza and major cities across the country, notably Gilgit, Rawalpindi, and Karachi.

== Climate ==
With virtually no rainfall during the year, Aliabad features a cold desert climate (BWk) under the Köppen climate classification. The average temperature in Aliabad is 11.0 °C, while the annual precipitation averages 125 mm. November is the driest month with 2 mm of rainfall, while May, the wettest month, has an average precipitation of 29 mm.

July is the warmest month of the year with an average temperature of 23.6 °C. The coldest month January has an average temperature of −3.0 °C.

Climate data for Aliabad
Month	Jan	Feb	Mar	Apr	May	Jun	Jul	Aug	Sep	Oct	Nov	Dec	Year
Mean daily maximum °C (°F)	1.4 (34.5)	4.2 (39.6)	10.1 (50.2)	16.8 (62.2)	21.9 (71.4)	27.4 (81.3)	30.2 (86.4)	29.6 (85.3)	24.6 (76.3)	18.1 (64.6)	11.2 (52.2)	4.0 (39.2)	16.6 (61.9)
Daily mean °C (°F)	−3.0 (26.6)	−0.5 (31.1)	5.3 (41.5)	11.4 (52.5)	15.8 (60.4)	20.8 (69.4)	23.6 (74.5)	23.2 (73.8)	18.3 (64.9)	11.8 (53.2)	5.5 (41.9)	−0.3 (31.5)	11.0 (51.8)
Mean daily minimum °C (°F)	−7.3 (18.9)	−5.2 (22.6)	0.5 (32.9)	6.0 (42.8)	9.7 (49.5)	14.2 (57.6)	17.0 (62.6)	16.8 (62.2)	12.0 (53.6)	5.6 (42.1)	−0.1 (31.8)	−4.6 (23.7)	5.4 (41.7)
Average precipitation mm (inches)	6 (0.2)	8 (0.3)	16 (0.6)	21 (0.8)	29 (1.1)	6 (0.2)	9 (0.4)	10 (0.4)	8 (0.3)	6 (0.2)	2 (0.1)	4 (0.2)	125 (4.8)
Source: Climate-Data.org

== Nearby ==
- To the West:
  - Hassanabad, Pakistan
  - Further afield: Nasirabad, Hussainabad, Sikandarabad, Jafarabad, Khizerabad
- To the East:
  - Baltit Fort, in Karimabad
  - Altit Fort, in Altit
  - Ganish Village, Hyderabad village east of aliabd
  - Further afield: Ahmedabad
- To the South:
  - Murtazaabad
  - Nagar Valley
