= Dourkhan =

Town in Hunza Valley

Dourkhan Dorkhan
- Town
- Interactive map of Dourkhan
- Country: Pakistan
- Region: Gilgit–Baltistan
- District: Hunza–Nagar District
- Time zone: UTC+5 (PKT)

Dourkhan or Dorkhan is a small town in Hunza Valley, Gilgit–Baltistan, Pakistan, 1 km from Ali Abad. Dourkhan village is a residential area consisting of about 150 houses. A middle school run by the education department of Gilgit–Baltistan is located in Dourkhan, and in 2012 an Air Foundation School system campus was also established. The civil session court of Hunza–Nagar District is also located in Dourkhan, as are offices of PWD and XEN.

The best gem-quality ruby crystals were extracted from the Dorkhan deposit in the lower zone of corundum mineralization. Pink, violet, and almost colourless sapphire are less common than ruby. Corundum var: Ruby and Corundum var: Sapphire. (Ref: E.Ya. Kievlenko, Geology of gems, 2003, p. 55). In the early 1970s, there was a special project of mining gemstones, which was at a standstill due to government action. Nowadays, some young people, mainly unemployed, try to find rubies and other precious gems in long tunnels approximately 1 km long.

The town management society of Dourkhan is working on development and infrastructure improvement with the support of Aga Khan Development Network and other international non-governmental organizations. Recently, a sewage-system project was completed, and a safe-drinking-water project is near its completion.
