= Karimabad, Gilgit-Baltistan =

Karimabad كريم آباد
- Town
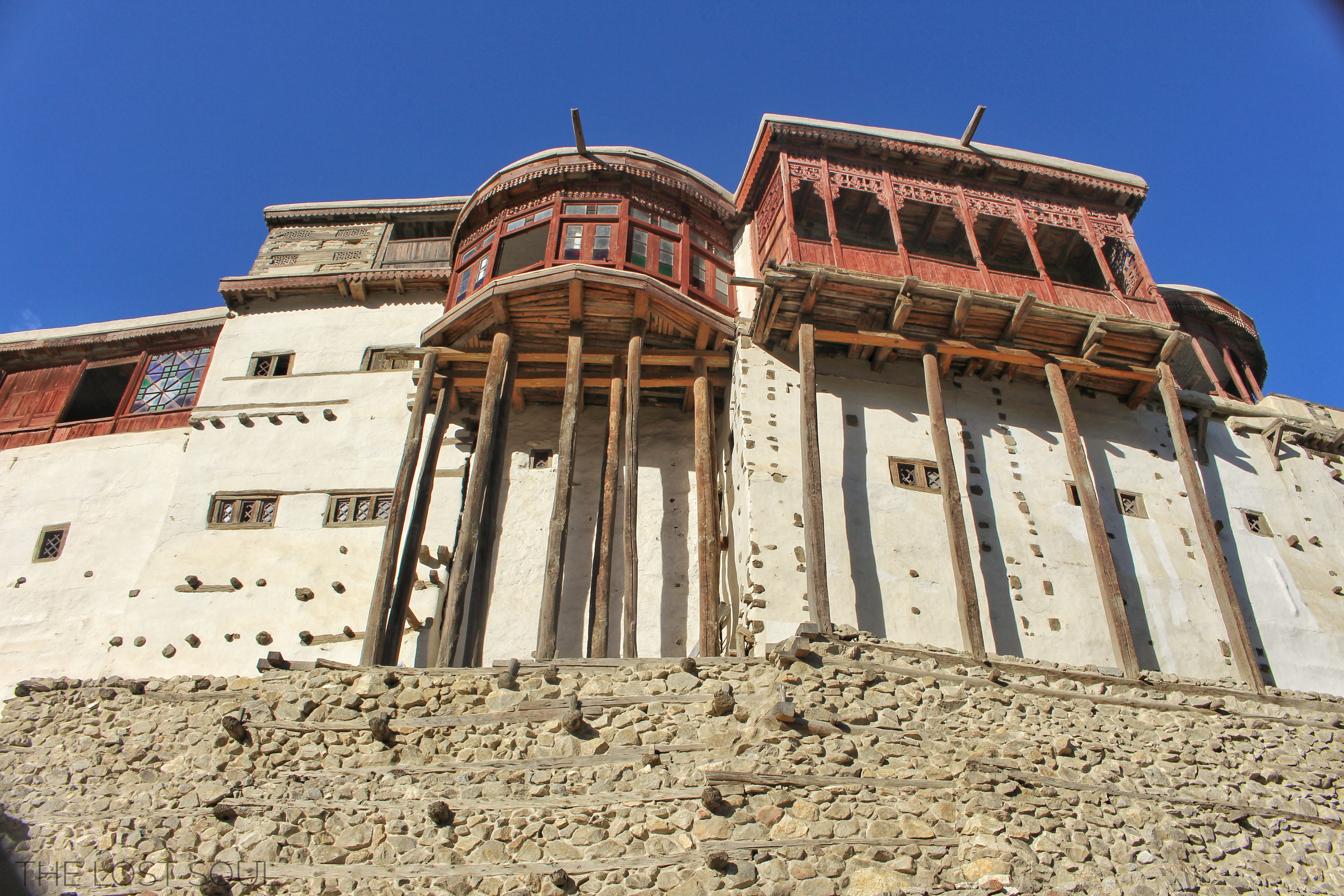
- Baltit Fort

- Location within Gilgit Baltistan Location within Pakistan
- Coordinates: 36.333°N 74.666°E
- Country: Pakistan
- Administrative territory: Gilgit-Baltistan
- Division: Gilgit Division
- District: Hunza District
- Tehsil: Aliabad Tehsil
- Capital: Karimabad
- Elevation: 2,603.3 m (8,541 ft)

Population (5,000 in 1992, 16,000 in 1996)
  - Total: 16,000
- Time zone: UTC+5 (PST)
- ISO 3166 code: PK-GB
- Climate: BWk

Karimabad (كريم آباد), formerly known as Baltit, is the capital of the Hunza District in the Pakistani-administered Gilgit-Baltistan of the disputed Kashmir region.

== Etymology ==
Karimabad was named in honour of Karim Aga Khan, the late spiritual leader of the Shia Ismaili Nizari community.

== Geography ==
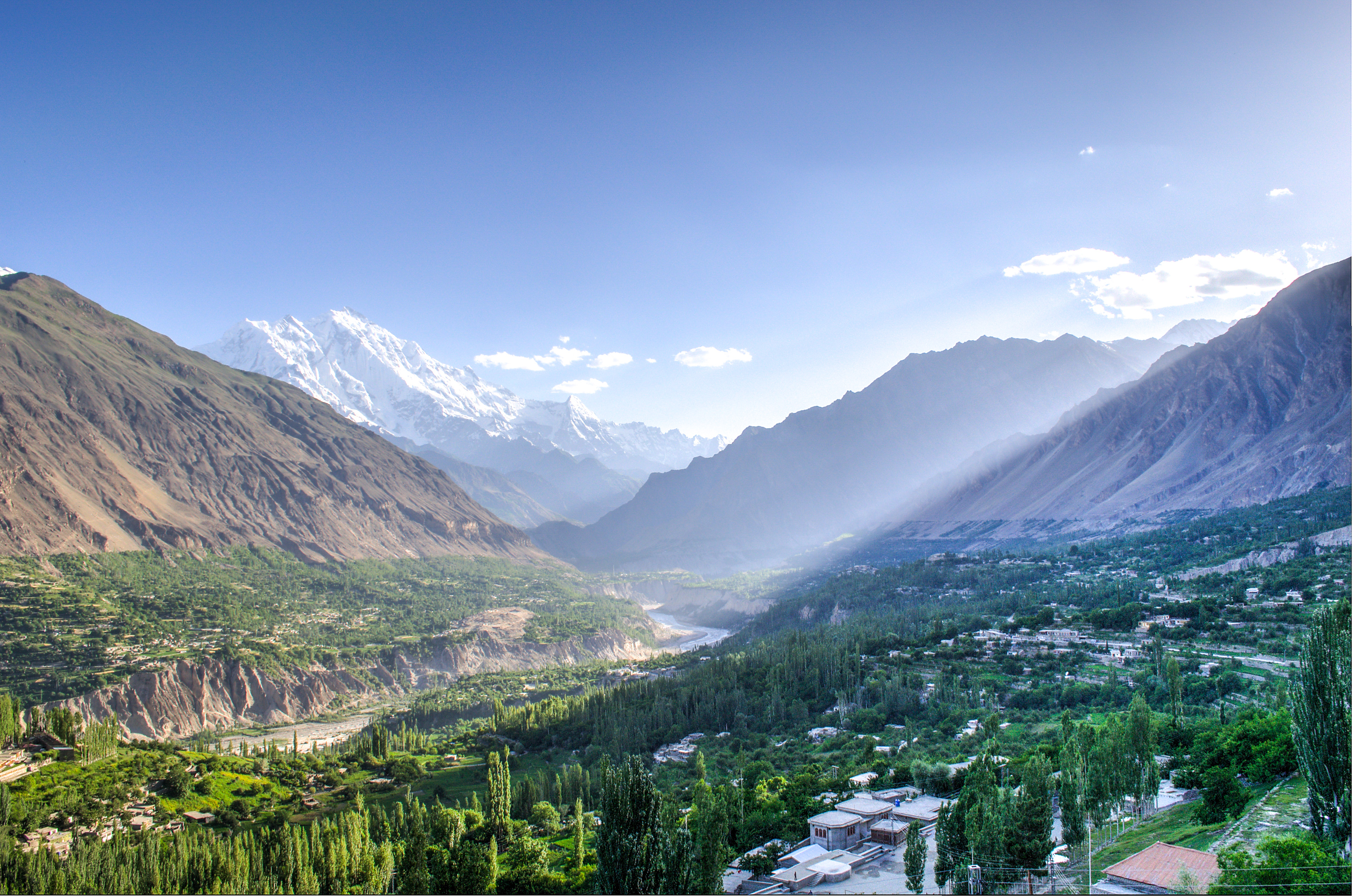
Hunza valley from Baltit Fort

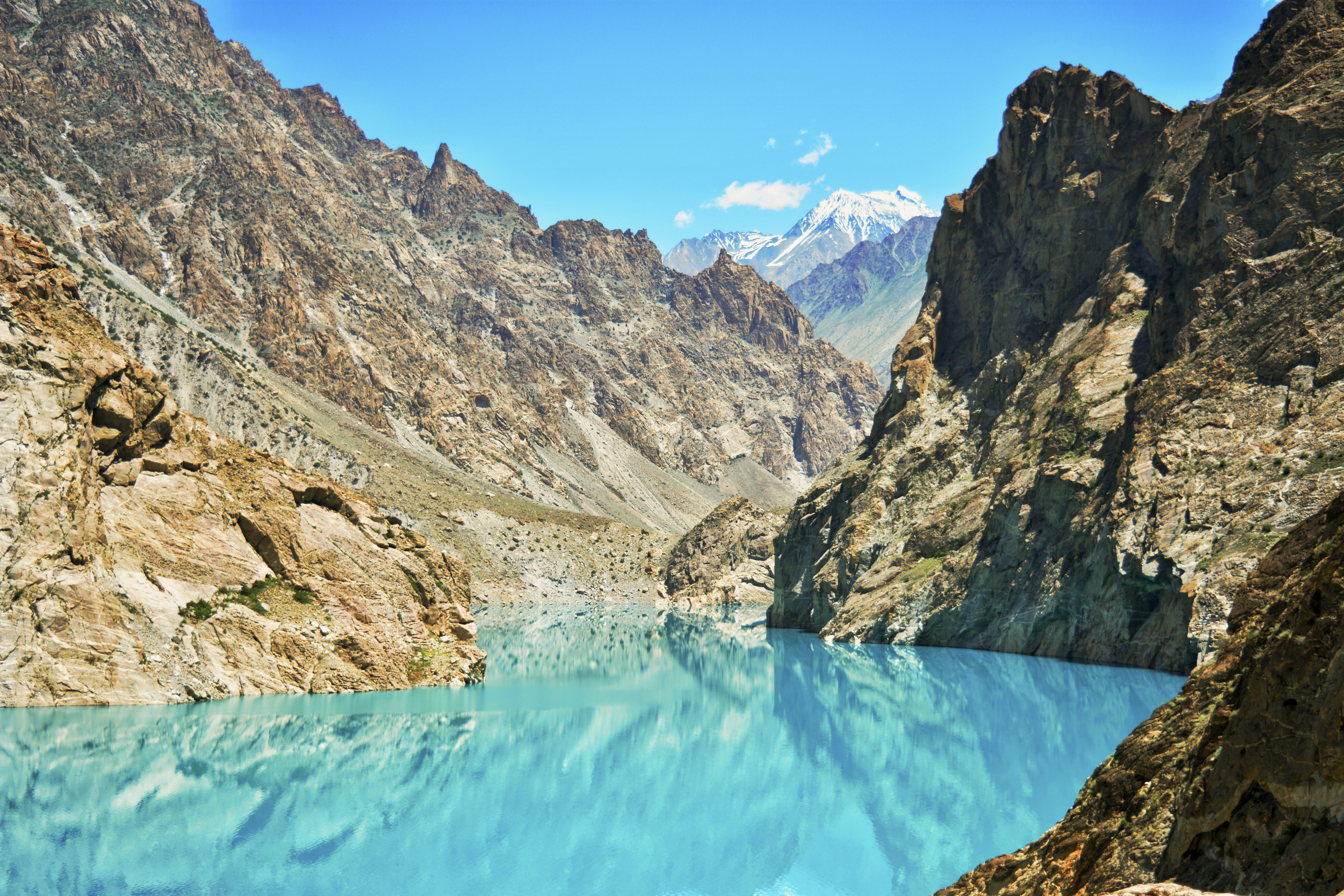
The vividly turquoise waters of the Attabad Lake are 9 miles north of Karimabad.

Karimabad town is situated on the western bank of the Hunza River, opposite Nagar Valley nestled in the lower Hunza Valley. It lies at an elevation of 8,200 feet (2,500 meters) above sea level. The town is characterized by its construction on stone-walled and steep-sloping terraces. Historically, Karimabad served as a caravan stop for travelers journeying through the Hindu Kush mountains en route to the Vale of Kashmir.

The town is framed by deep gorges and set against the backdrop of snow-clad peaks such as Rakaposhi (7,788 m; 25,551 ft), Diran, Golden Peak, and Ultar Peak. All four peaks have dedicated view points in and around the town. Access to Karimabad is primarily via a hill road leading from Aliabad.

Altit lies 3 km to the lower west of Karimabad. To the direct south of town lies the ancient settlement of Ganish. Aliabad is around 7 km to the west. Duikar (Eagle's Nest) is to the north-west from the town. In the far east is Attabad Lake. The confluence of the Hunza River and Nagar River lies in Ganish.

== Climate ==
The weather conditions in Karimabad are characterized by a chilly and moderate climate. Karimabad is a city with a significant rainfall. Even in the driest month there is a lot of rain. Köppen and Geiger classify this climate as Dfb. The temperature here averages -5.4 °C | 22.3 °F. The annual rainfall is 860 mm | 33.9 inch.

=== Flora and fauna ===
The floral vegetation in the wild consist of roses, pansies, lilies, zinnias, and cosmos, along with trees such as apple, apricot, walnut, mulberry, willow, fir, and poplar trees.

The fauna recorded in the village consist of ibex (Capra (genus), duck, red-striped fox, snow leopard (Panthera uncia syn. Uncia uncia), markhor (Capra falconeri) (wild goat), Marco Polo sheep (Ovis ammon polii), and yak (Bos grunniens and Bos mutus).

== History ==
Karimabad, previously known as Baltit, was originally ruled by a monarch, the Mir of Hunza. The Baltit Fort was built at that time to function as the Mir's palace. The location was known as a caravan resting stop, and for its slave trade.

Baltit served as the capital of Hunza Valley for over 750 years, until the middle of the 20th century. After Pakistan became an independent country in 1947, the Hunza province controlled by the Mir voluntarily joined Pakistan. Earlier, the capital had been shifted from the area around Balit down to the lower part of the hills where new buildings were erected, which became the new capital, Karimabad. The new town developed into a tourist destination following the construction of the Karakoram Highway, with numerous shopping complexes selling handicrafts, as well as hotels, restaurants, and travel agencies.

Both Baltit Fort and Karimabad village received the World Award of Tourism in 2000 when Indonesia, Australia, India, and Britain and other countries competed.

== Demographics ==
The population of the town was more than 5,000 in 1992. It had four clans of herdsmen tending livestock. Out of a population of 16,000 (65,000 in the valley) as of 1995, most of the residents of the town and the Hunza valley were Shia Ismaili Muslims. Literacy in the valley is as high as 90% as against a national average of 58 percent. Residents of the town say that all young people of the town below the age of 30 are literate.

== Education ==
There was a high school in the town in 1986 itself when the population of the Hunza valley was 30,000. The town has received substantial assistance from the Aga Khan Foundation, a charitable institution, which is involved in infrastructure activities such as roads and water supply, as well as in establishing educational institutions and health centres. There are also schools for women such as the Aga Khan Higher Secondary School for Girls, and the Hasegawa Memorial Public School run by Japan, which are popular for girls.

== Economy ==
The economy is dependent on agriculture with crops such as corn (maize), fruits, and vegetables grown under irrigated conditions. An article on The Guardian ranked it as one of the five "Best Tourist Sites" in Pakistan.

== Landmarks ==
The landmarks around the town are the Baltit Fort, Queen Victoria Monument, Channel Walk and the snow clad mountains of Rakaposhi and glaciers of Ulter Nala.

=== Baltit Fort ===
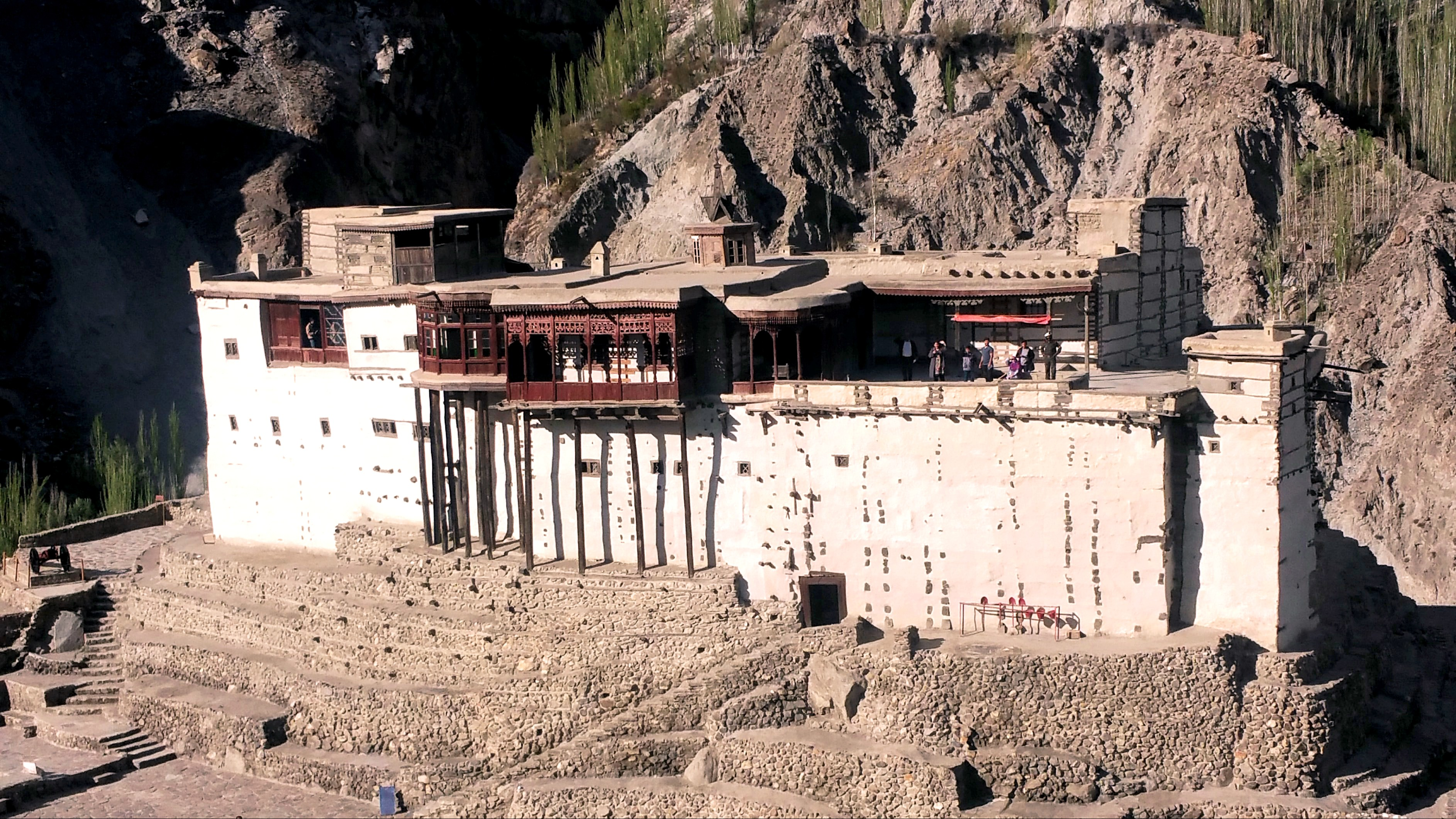
The fort's construction and design were influenced by those in Tibet.

Baltit, which was the original capital of the Hunza valley, was established in the 13th century. A fort was built, in the backdrop of snow clad mountains, in the 17th century when Mir Ayesho II's (great-grandson of Girkis, a legendary ruler) wife, the daughter of the Balti ruler, came to live in Hunza. The fort was built in Balti-style by the artisans brought by her. It was refurbished during Ayesho II's son's rule. Mir Nazim Khan got it refurnished with wall paper, curtains, fireplaces, balconies, and windows with tinted glass. The exterior of the fort was given a white wash. He also built a raised platform in the terrace to hold meetings of the council. Once the capital was moved to Karimabad, the fort was stripped of all its interior furnishings and decorations. Nazim Khan's son had moved to Karimabad in 1945.It was a deserted structure in 1984. However, between 1990 and 1996 the fort was completely rebuilt with all structural elements of the old fort to its original plan taking earthquake factor into consideration. The fort presents a view as if it has been newly built but retains all the original features, and commands a scenic view of the Hunza valley. Some of the rooms in the fort have exhibits of dresses and pictures as also some ancient vessels and furniture donated by the local people.

=== Queen Victoria Monument ===
The Queen Victoria Monument is erected on a rock face at the rear end of Karimabad. It can be accessed only by trekking for about an hour passing through irrigation channels, a polo ground, an old watch tower, and a narrow passage strewn with rocks. It is at the base of the rock face and was built by Nazim Khan; in the local Burushaski language it is known "Malikamu Shikari" (ma-li-ka-mu shi-ka-ri).

=== Channel Walk ===
Ultar Nala water channels (seven channels flowing towards the west and five flowing eastward) from the head-works on the nala taking off at different levels are utilized for irrigation, and also as tourist attraction to walk along their route for views of the Hunza Valley. Some channels pass through the Karimabad town. The water flowing in the channel has a velvety colour caused by the minute content of fine mica particles.

== Bibliography ==
- Ahmad, Asghar (1986). Pakistan tourism directory, '86: everything about tourism. Holiday Weekly.
- Camerapix (1998). Spectrum Guide to Pakistan. Interlink Books. ISBN 978-1-56656-240-9.
- Ehlers, Eckart; Kreutzmann, Hermann (2000). High Mountain Pastoralism in Northern Pakistan. Franz Steiner Verlag. ISBN 978-3-515-07662-3.
- Kocour, Ruth Anne (8 July 2015). Walking the Warzones of Pakistan: One Woman's Journey into the Shadow of the Taliban. Lulu.com. ISBN 978-1-4834-3348-6.
- Naureen, Mujahida (2002). Tourism in Pakistan: Problems and Prospects. National Institute of Pakistan Studies, Quaid-i-Azam University.
