= Ganish =

Ganish گنش گَنِش Ganish Khun
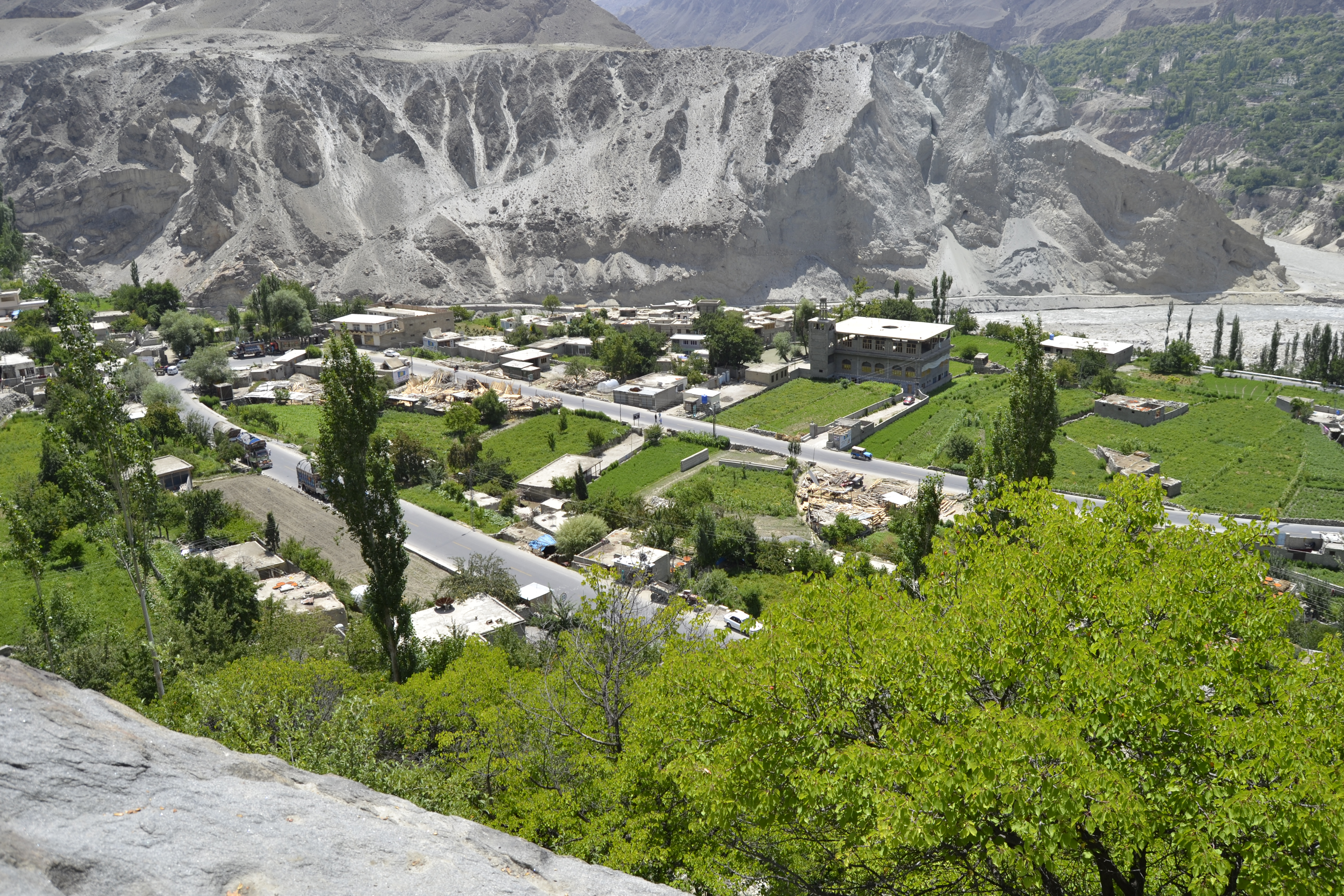
- Ganish as seen from Karimabad in summer

- Location in Hunza Pakistan Ganish (Pakistan)
- Coordinates: 36.315°N 74.668°E
- Country: Pakistan
- Administrative territory: Gilgit-Baltistan
- Division: Gilgit Division
- District: Hunza District
- Tehsil: Aliabad Tehsil
- Elevation: 2,240 m (7,350 ft)
- Time zone: UTC+5 (PST)
  - Summer (DST): UTC+6 (PDT)

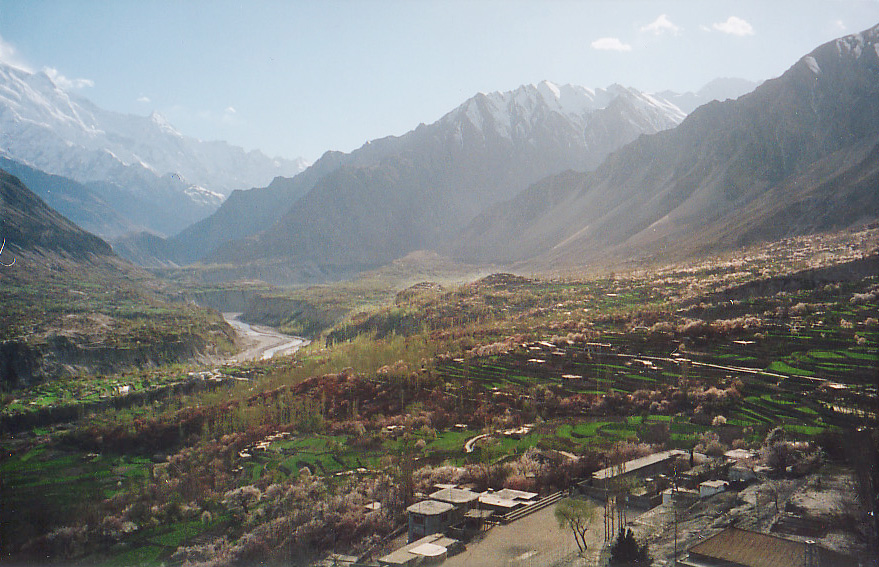
Hunza valley river

Ganish (Urdu: گنش, Burushaski: گَنِش, also Ganish Khun) is a village in the Hunza District within the Gilgit Baltistan region of Pakistan. Ganish also collectively refers to multiple villages in and around the area. It is the oldest and first settlement on the ancient Silk Road in the Hunza Valley, and is the site of various ancient watchtowers, traditional mosques, religious centers, and a reservoir. The settlement is at least a 1,000 years old and was awarded the UNESCO Asia-Pacific Heritage Award for Culture Heritage Conservation in 2003.

== Etymology ==
The word "Ganish" is unknown but according to the local scholars, it is derived from the Burushaski word "گنش", (Ganish) which means gold. Ganish has been a major town for travelers since the days of the Silk Road - now the Karakorum Highway.

== Location ==
Ganish is a historic settlement on the banks of the Hunza river, dating back to around a 1,000 years. Ganish was a stop on the ancient Silk Route and its strategic location has allowed the settlement to flourish since the past.

The Karakoram Highway (National Highway 35), which was completed in 1979, runs rights through Ganish and goes all the way to Pakistan's border with China at Khunjerab top. It is located 90 km from Gilgit city in further west and about 7 km away from the headquarters of Hunza District, Aliabad in the west. The main tourist town of the Hunza valley, Karimabad is 2 km to the north. The Altit Fort is 15 km to the north-east. In the south lies the confluence of the Hunza and Nagar rivers. The Nagar Valley is directly opposite to Ganish and much of Hunza Valley.

== UNESCO awards ==
Ganish is home to four ancient mosques - the Ganish Mosques - that are 300–400 years old. They were awarded the UNESCO Asia-Pacific Heritage Award for Culture Heritage Conservation in 2002.

The Ali Gohar House in Ganish is located next to one of the iconic shikari watchtowers of the town. A few watchtowers have survived the harsh weather and collapse due to sliding towards southeast. The fortified settlement has 40 feet Tamurkux watchtower which was used in the past for the surveillance of the surroundings, especially at nights. The settlement used to be at a high risk of attacks and looting because of its location along the ancient Silk Road. The 400-year-old house was awarded the UNESCO Asia-Pacific Awards for Cultural Heritage Conservation in 2009.

== Administration ==
The sub-villages of Ganish include Garelth, Chaboikushal, Shukunoshal, Gamun Ganish, Buldas and Tsillganish. Gamun Ganish is the center of the village with a population of around 5000. The Yadgar Chowk is where all the locals meet to discuss matters of the town.

Chaboikushal is a sub-village of Ganish. This small village is located right in the heart of Hunza Valley. There are about 25 houses. Chaboikushal was derived from Chaboi, the grandfather of Sheril. According to old locals in the village, Chaboi was migrated from Iran, where he had two sons: Helo and Melo. Melo remained and was raised in Chaboikushal and Helo migrated to the Nagar valley. The one who resided in this village was one of the bravest persons of his times, hardworking and the closest to King of Hunza.

Chel Ganish or Chill Ganish, is a sub-village of Ganish. There are 25 families living here. Chel Ganish is one of the most ancient villages of Ganish which has a rich history. The residents of belong to the eponymous tribe: Chelganishkuz. The word Chel means water and Ganishkuz means residents of Ganish.

Sheikh Ali was a prominent cleric in Tsillganish and Haji Muhammad Bilal (late) was the main leader from the area who was also the first Haji (pilgrim of Ka'ba) from Hunza. Jamia tul Zehra is the main institution for education in the village. Qadimi Imambargarh is rich in its beautiful wood artwork carried out by the artisans of ancient times.

Garelth is also a sub-village of Ganish with a population of about 135 families. FG Boys Middle School, Aga Khan Diamond School are the main educational institutions. Former Member District Council Gilgit Baltistan Jan Alam, Former Chairman Village Council Darvesh, and Muhammad Ali Barcha have been leading politically. Currently, Ghulam Mustafa Barcha, grandson of Major Ghulam Murtaza is Chairman of Garelth Hunza.

Subedar Major Fida Ali, one of the main leaders of the independence movement of Gilgit-Baltistan, belongs to this village. Fida Ali played a key role in the independence of Gilgit-Baltistan. He was a key figure who launched the freedom movement against the Dogra dynasty in Gilgit. Major Ghulam Murtaza (Sitara-e-Jurat), a key person in the revolution of the independence movement of Gilgit-Baltistan, also belongs to this village. He made major gains by leading troops into India. His graveyard is located next to KKH at Garelth.

Other villages in the area include Dalkhun, Maeenkhun, Shaknoukshal, Mominabad and Giram Basi.

== See also ==
- Karimabad
- Aliabad
- Altit
- Hunza Princely State
- Hunza District
- Hunza Valley
