= Hunza–Nagar District =

Former district of Gilgit–Baltistan, Pakistan

The Hunza–Nagar District is a former district of Gilgit–Baltistan in Pakistan. In July 2015, the district was divided into two separate districts, namely Hunza District and Nagar District.

== Education ==
According to the Alif Ailaan Pakistan District Education Rankings 2015, Hunza-Nagar was ranked 21 out of 148 districts in Pakistan in terms of education. For facilities and infrastructure, the district was ranked 58 out of 148.

== See also ==
- Naltar Valley
- Hunza Valley
- Karakoram Highway
- Gilgit
