= Nasirabad (Hunza) =

Town located in the Hunza District of Gilgit-Baltistan, Pakistan

Nasirabad ناصر آباد
- Town
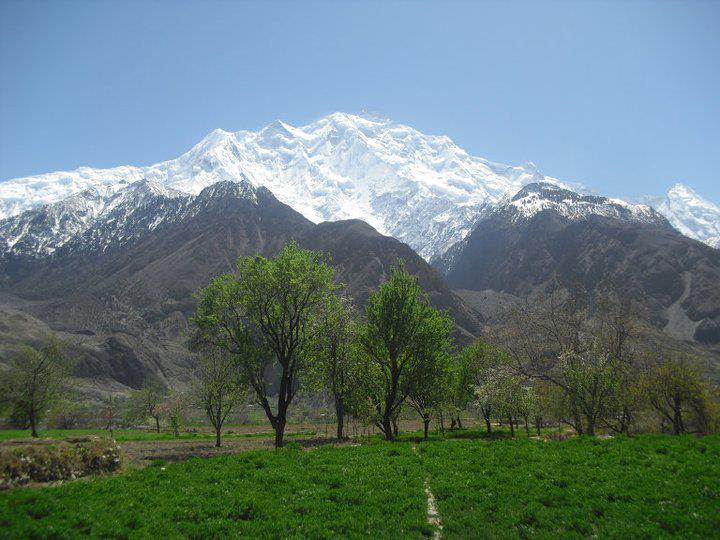
- The Nasirabad Hunza valley

- Location within Pakistan
- Coordinates: 36.263844°N 74.525956°E
- Country: Pakistan

Population (2017)
  - Total: 6,000

Nasirabad (Urdu: ناصر آباد) is a town located in the Hunza District of Gilgit-Baltistan region in Pakistan.

== Geography ==
Nasirabad is located in Gilgit-Baltistan and bordered to the south by the Hunza River. The Karakoram Highway is the main commercial road, containing multiple businesses including hotels, hostels, cafes, and stores.

== Former names ==
Nasirabad was known as Hayul Dass during the Rono age. It was later known as Manishmal, a Hindi word for "a fertile place with great prosperity". Later still it was known as "Hini", derived from "Hin", which means "snow" in the Shina language.

== History ==
The earliest known history of Nasirabad dates back to the Rono people, who flourished across the Hunza region. The Rono emerged and flourished before the early-16th-century arrival of the forefathers of the current tribes in the settlement, such as the Tartay and Doodiye.

== Gallery ==
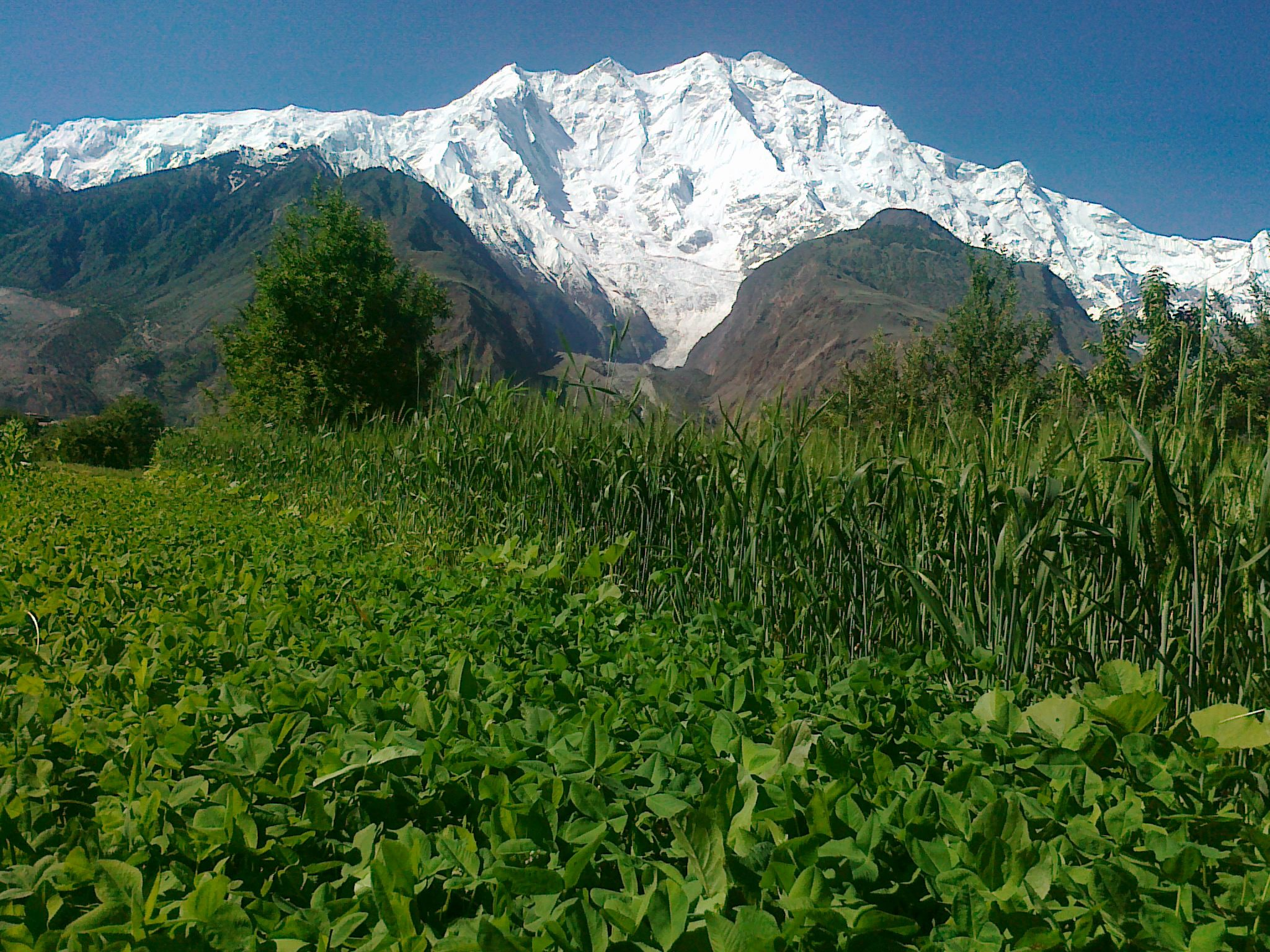
Nasirabad

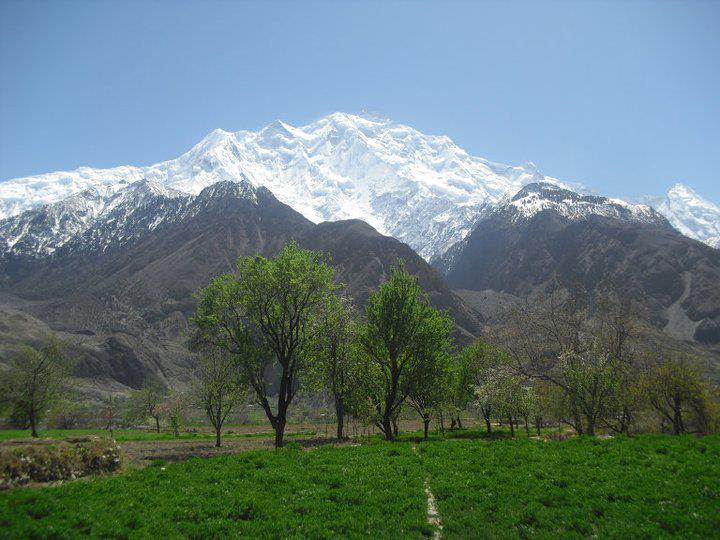
Nasirabad

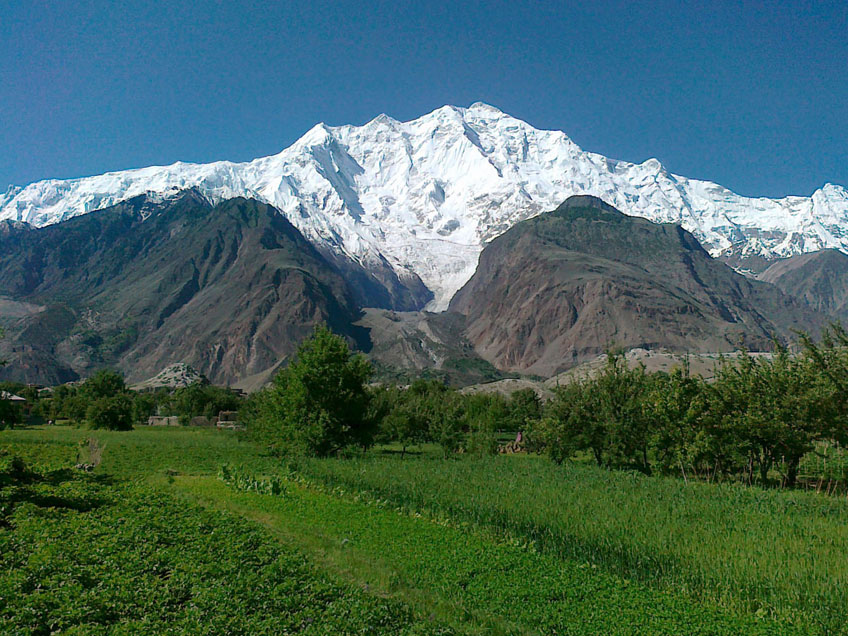
Nasirabad
