= Murtazaabad =

Village in Hunza, Gilgit-Baltistan, Pakistan

Coordinates: 30°43′N 71°19′E

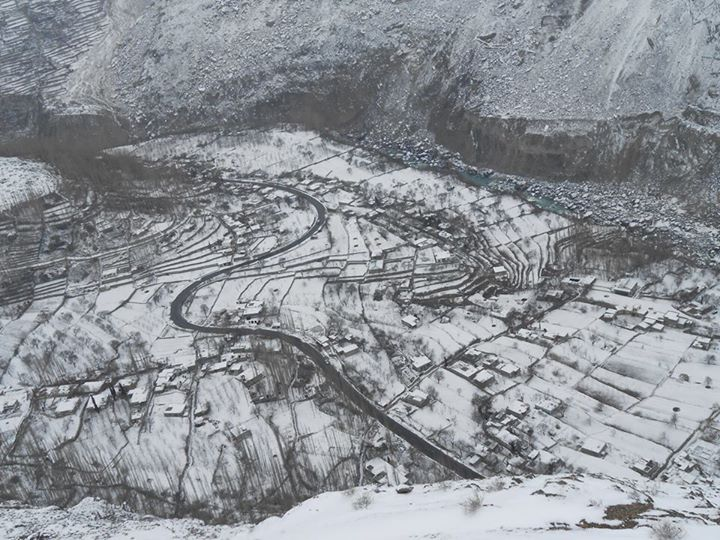
Murtazaabad after snowfall in winter

Murtazaabad (Urdu: مرتضى آباد) is the first village of central Hunza in Gilgit-Baltistan, Pakistan. It is situated along the Hunza River.

== Geographic location ==
Murtazaabad (old: Neray das) is surrounded by two villages (East Hasanabad and West Nasirabad). The River Hunza is in the South, and small mountains in the North. Land is fertile, 40% of the area is cultivated and 35% area consists of forestry. More than 30% of the area is mountainous.

It is divided into two major geographic divisions, 1) Murtazaabad Paien (KhaKhan) and 2) Murtazaabad Bala (Dal Khan). Both the areas are irrigated by two major pools linked to Hasanabad Nala. Law and order situation is excellent. Mightiest Rakahposhi is just in front of the village.

== Population and languages ==
Almost 100% of the residents speak the Burushaski language. The population is divided into Shia Ismailies (Aga Khani Ismaili) and Shia Isna-e-asree (Twelvers). The Karakoram Highway passes through the village. The total population is 3000. There are five schools, one madarasa, and two public libraries. Most people work in government institutions, and many others in agriculture; its cherries and apples are widely known. A tribal system still exists within the local population.

== Government system ==
In Murtazaabad there are three local council seats for men, and one for women. All these members are selected through election, held under the Government of Pakistan. There is also local governmental system run under Numberdars. There are 5 Numberdars in Murtazabad.

== Number of Homes ==
In Murtazabad there are approximately 400 homes. Currently in 2020, the Population of village is more than 3000.

== Schools ==
In village there are 5 schools and 1 madrasa. One of the previously existing school named as Al Murtaza Academy is reconstructed and now it is a National Level school and It will be started in 2020.
