= Baltit Fort =

Fort in Pakistan

Baltit Fort قلعہ بلتت
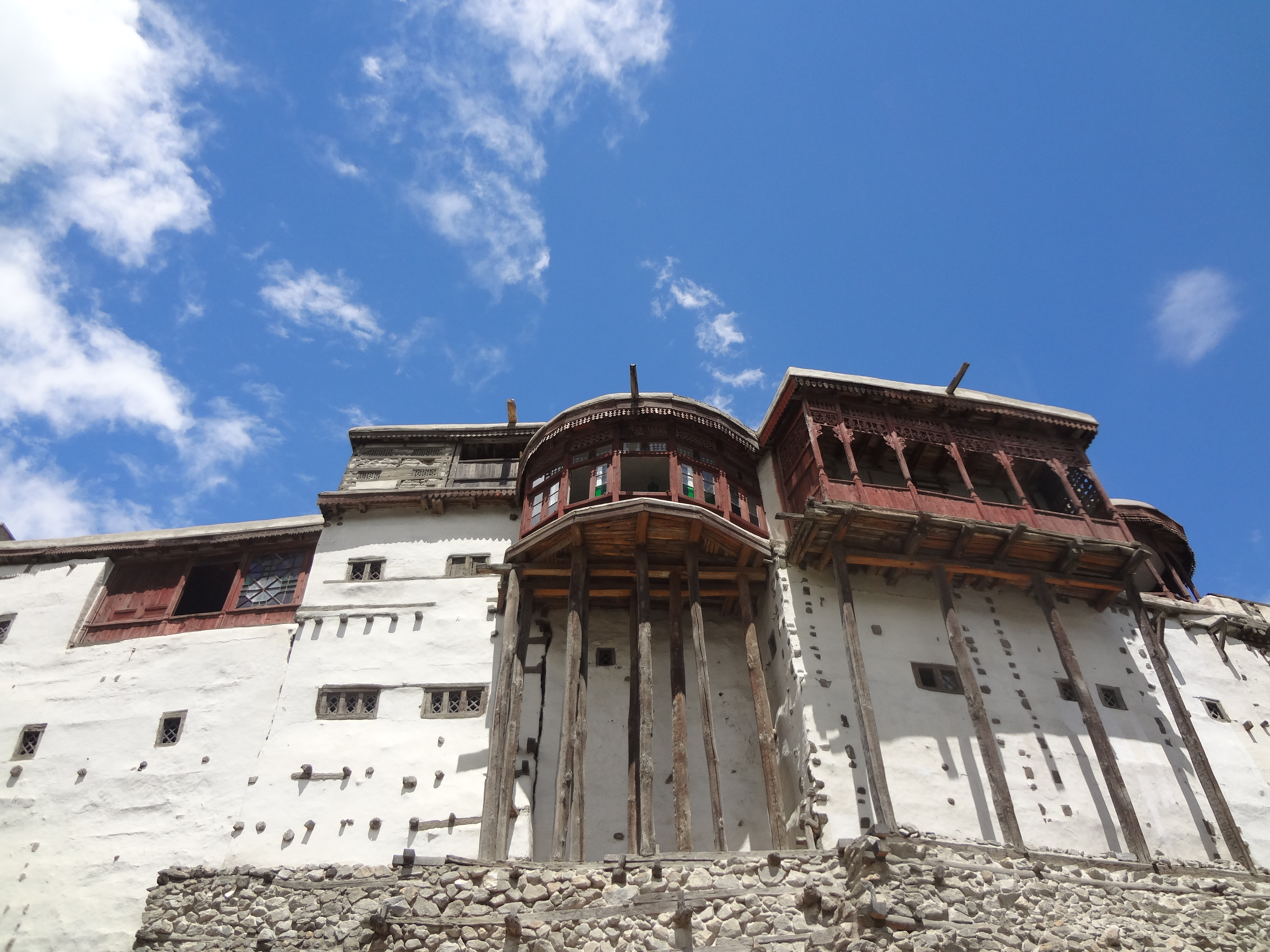
- Baltit Fort
- Interactive map of the Baltit Fort قلعہ بلتت area

General information
- Location: Karimabad, Gilgit-Baltistan, Pakistan
- Coordinates: 36°19′32″N 74°40′11″E

Baltit Fort (Urdu: قلعہ بلتت) is a palatial fort in the Hunza Valley, near the town of Karimabad, in the Gilgit-Baltistan region of northern Pakistan. It has been on the UNESCO World Heritage Tentative list since 2004.

The conversation work carried out in the last decade of 20th-century indicated that the core structures, including the defensive stone and timber tower, date to the 8th century CE. The architecture of the fort reflects Tibetan influences. In the 16th-century, Ayasho II, the Mir of Hunza, married Shah Khatun, a princess from Skardu and the granddaughter of Ali Sher Khan Anchan. The father-in-law Abdal Khan sent artisans who rebuilt the fort. Abdal Khan also sent a cannon in dowry which bears date of 1539 CE.

The Mirs of Hunza abandoned the fort in 1945, and moved to a new palace down the hill. The fort started to decay which caused concern that it might possibly fall into ruin. Following a survey by the Royal Geographical Society of London a restoration programme was initiated and supported by the Aga Khan Trust for Culture Historic Cities Support Programme. The programme was completed in 1996 and the fort is now a museum run by the Baltit Heritage Trust.

== Awards ==
- 2005 Time Asia, Best of Asia Award

== Gallery ==
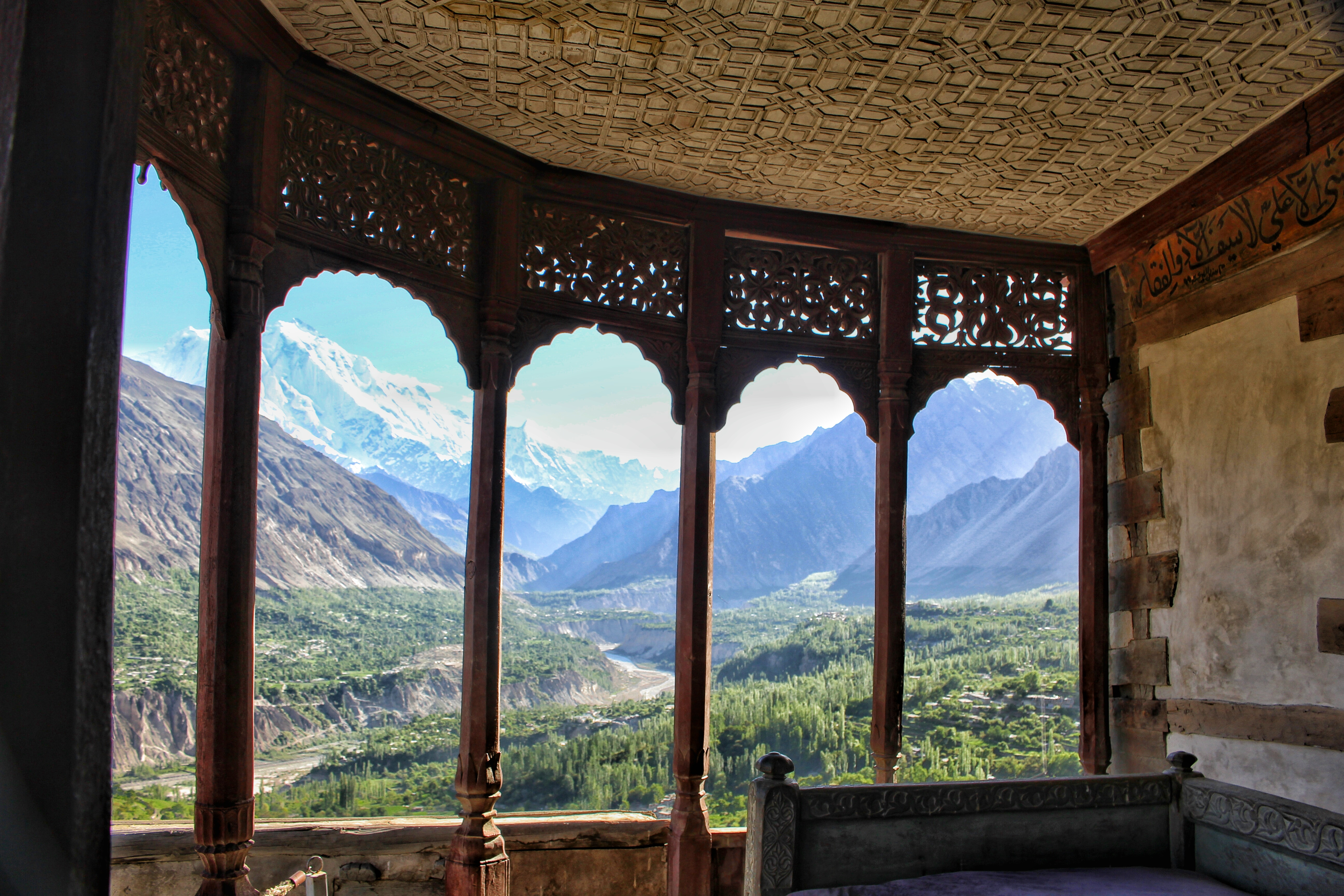
Baltit Fort

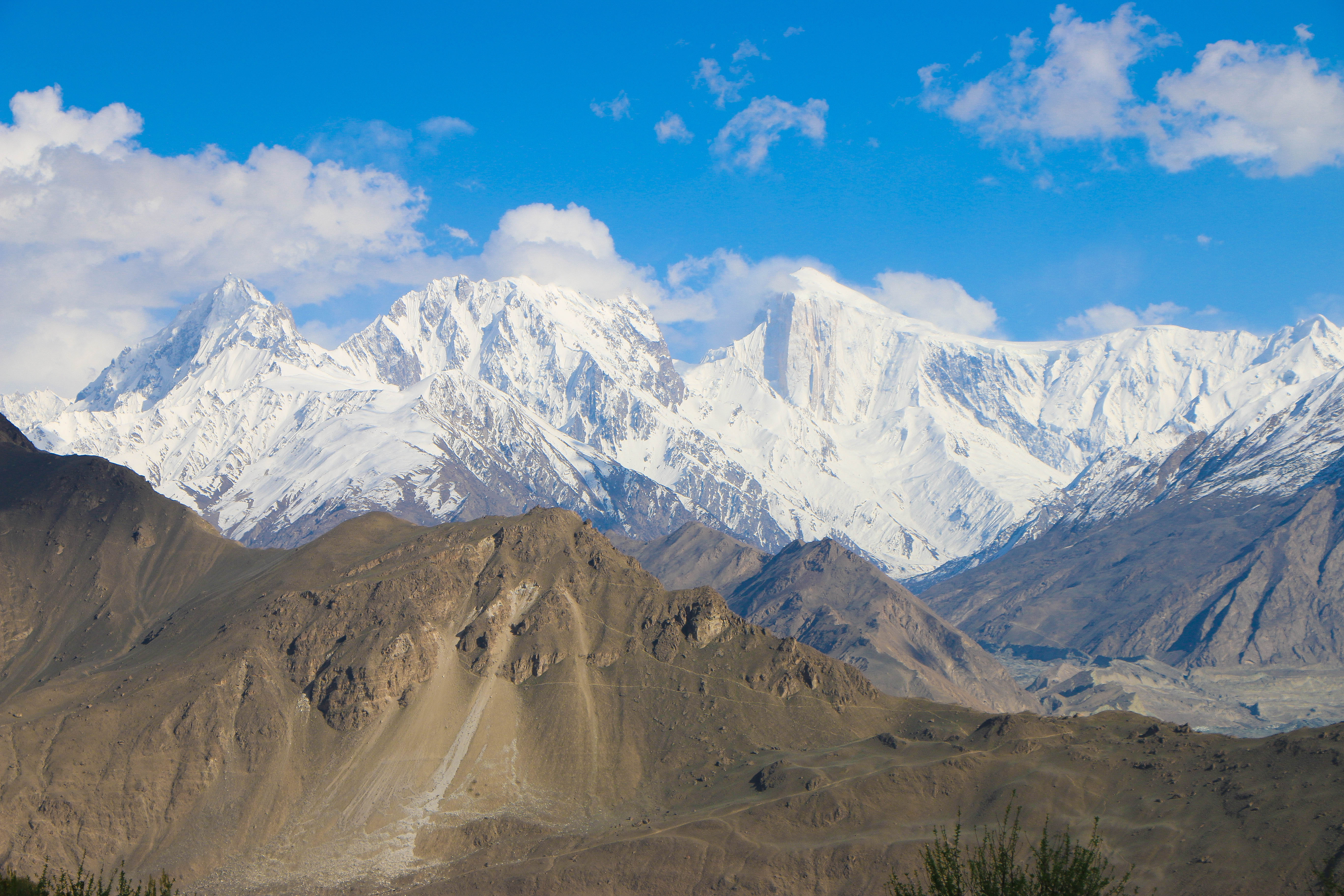
Spantik as viewed to the south-east from the fort

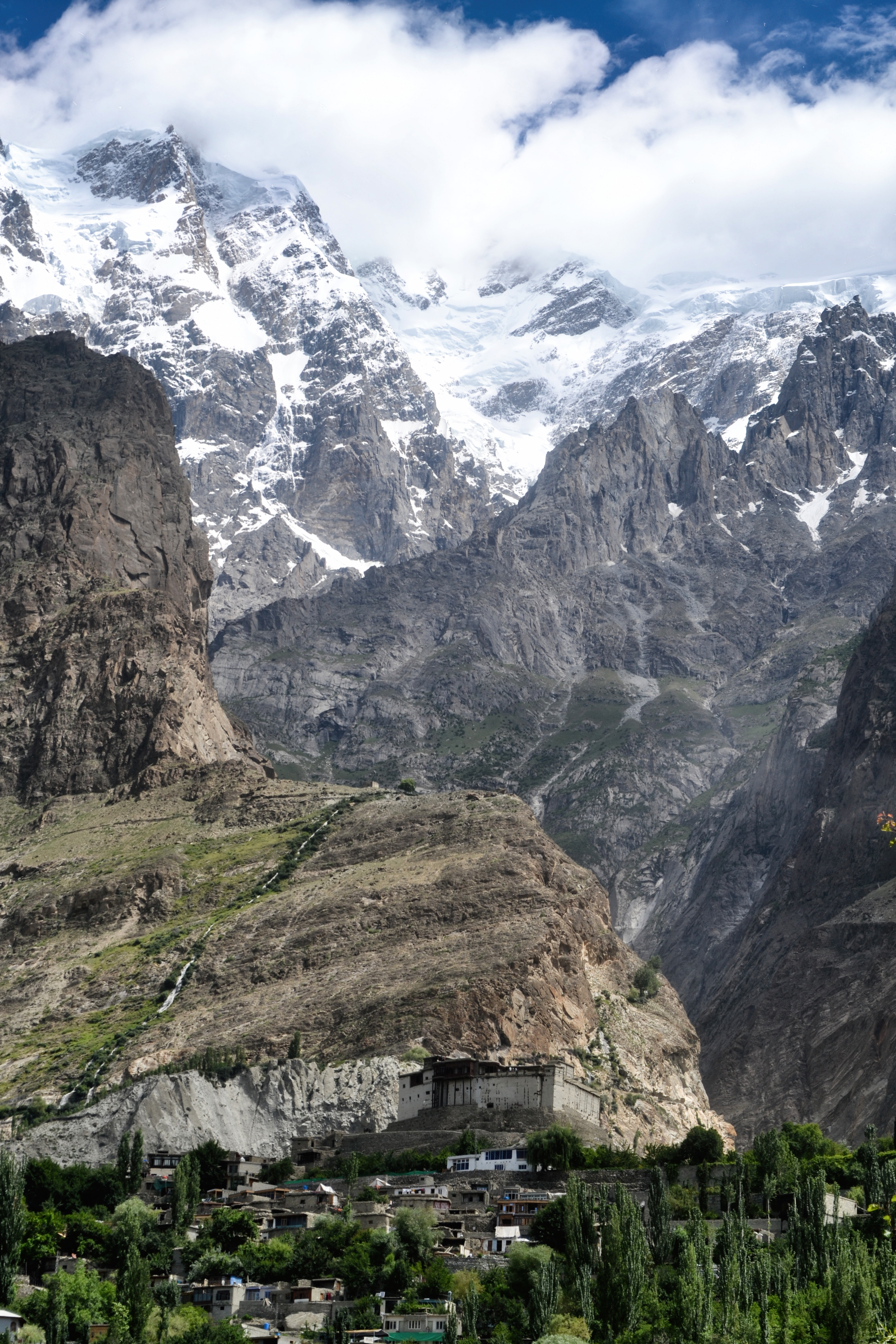
Ultar Peak towers above the fort

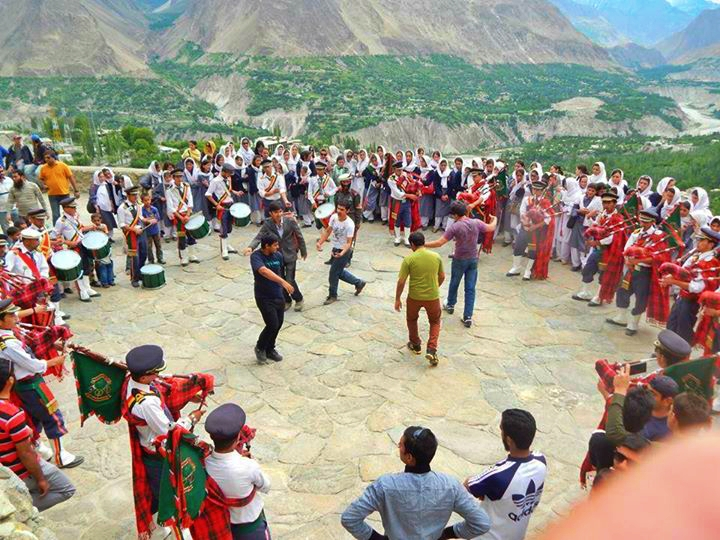
Dance with traditional music at Baltit Fort

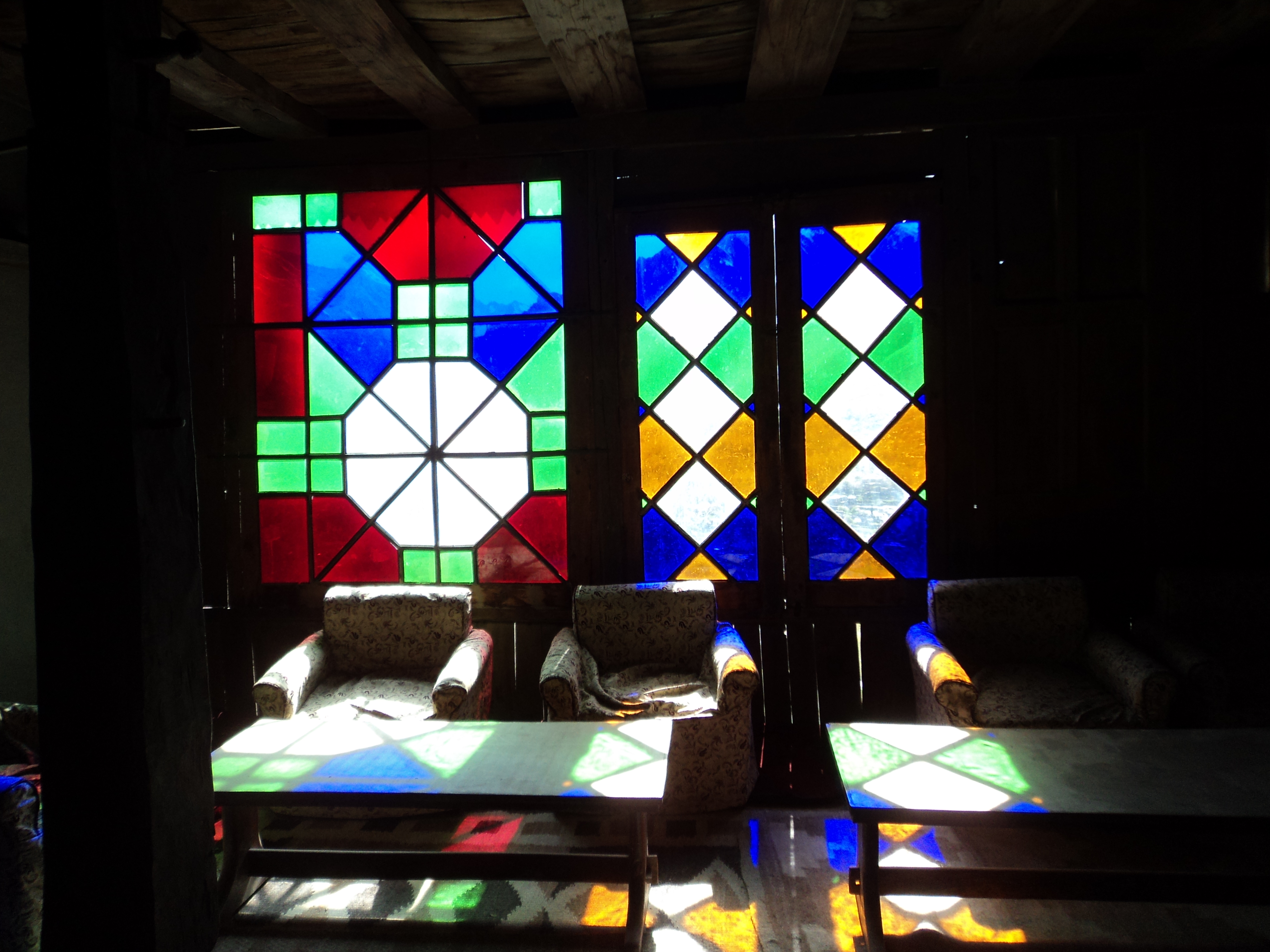
The fort is decorated with simple stain-glassed windows

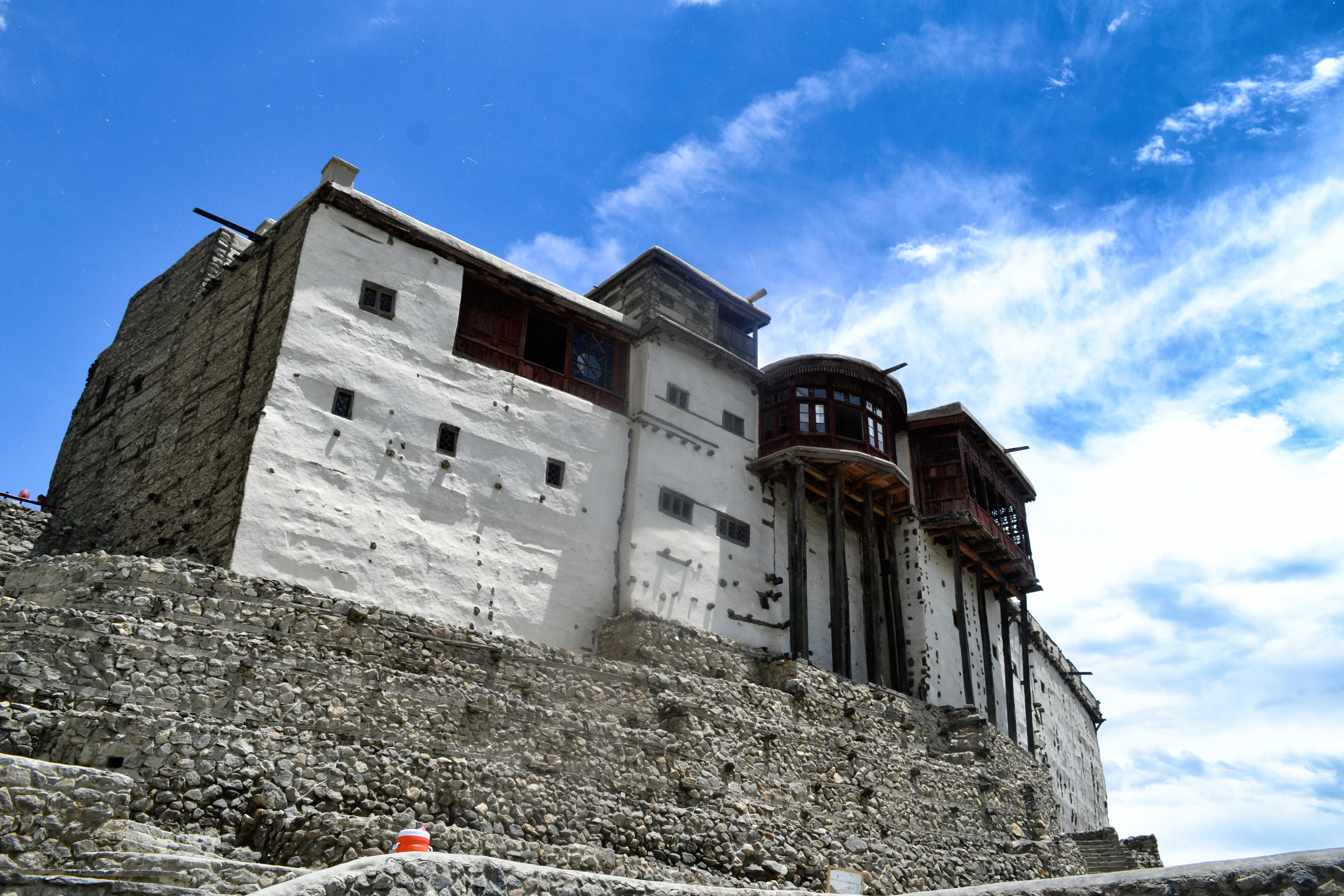
View of Baltit Fort

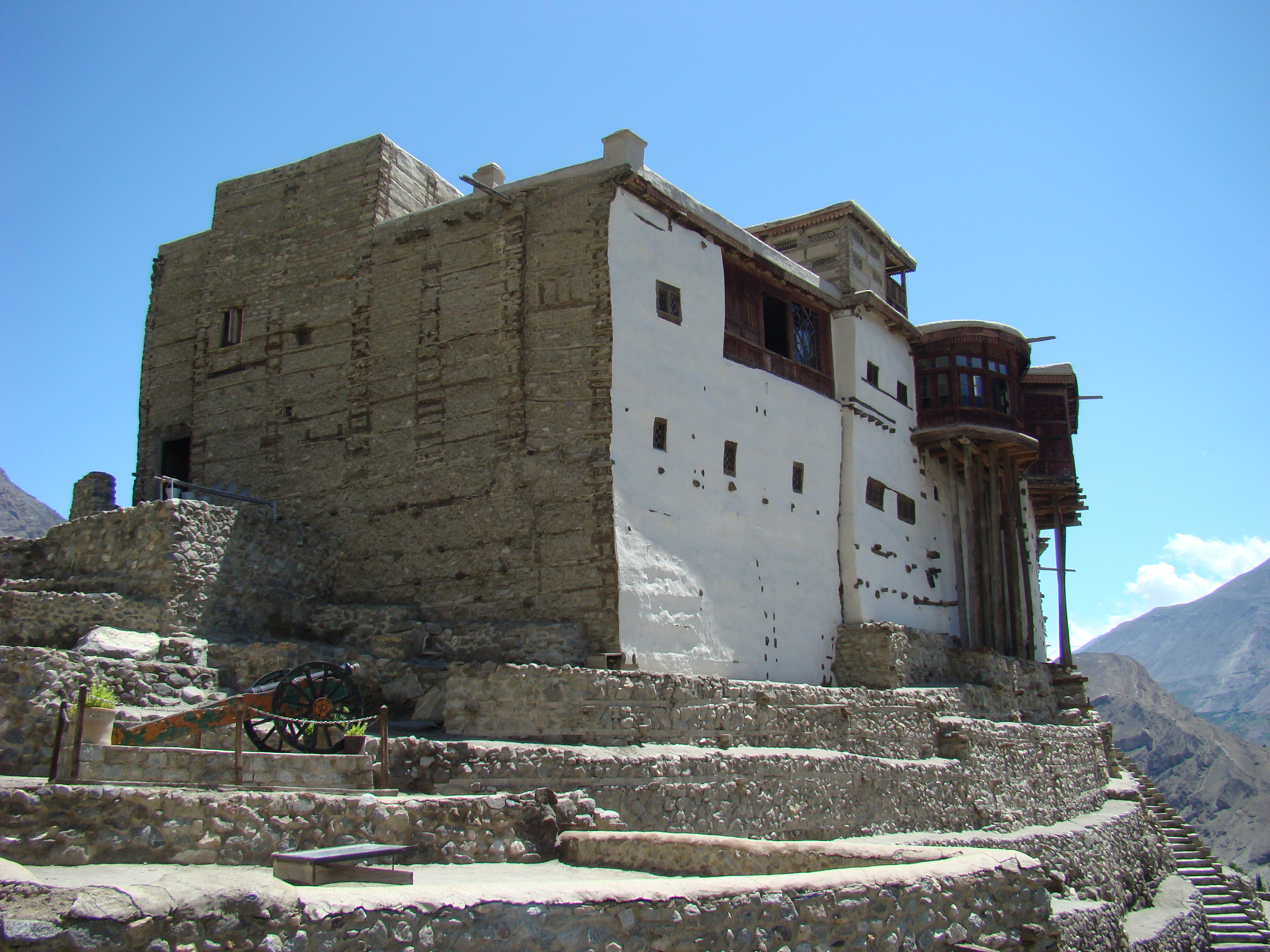
Baltit Fort, Hunza Valley

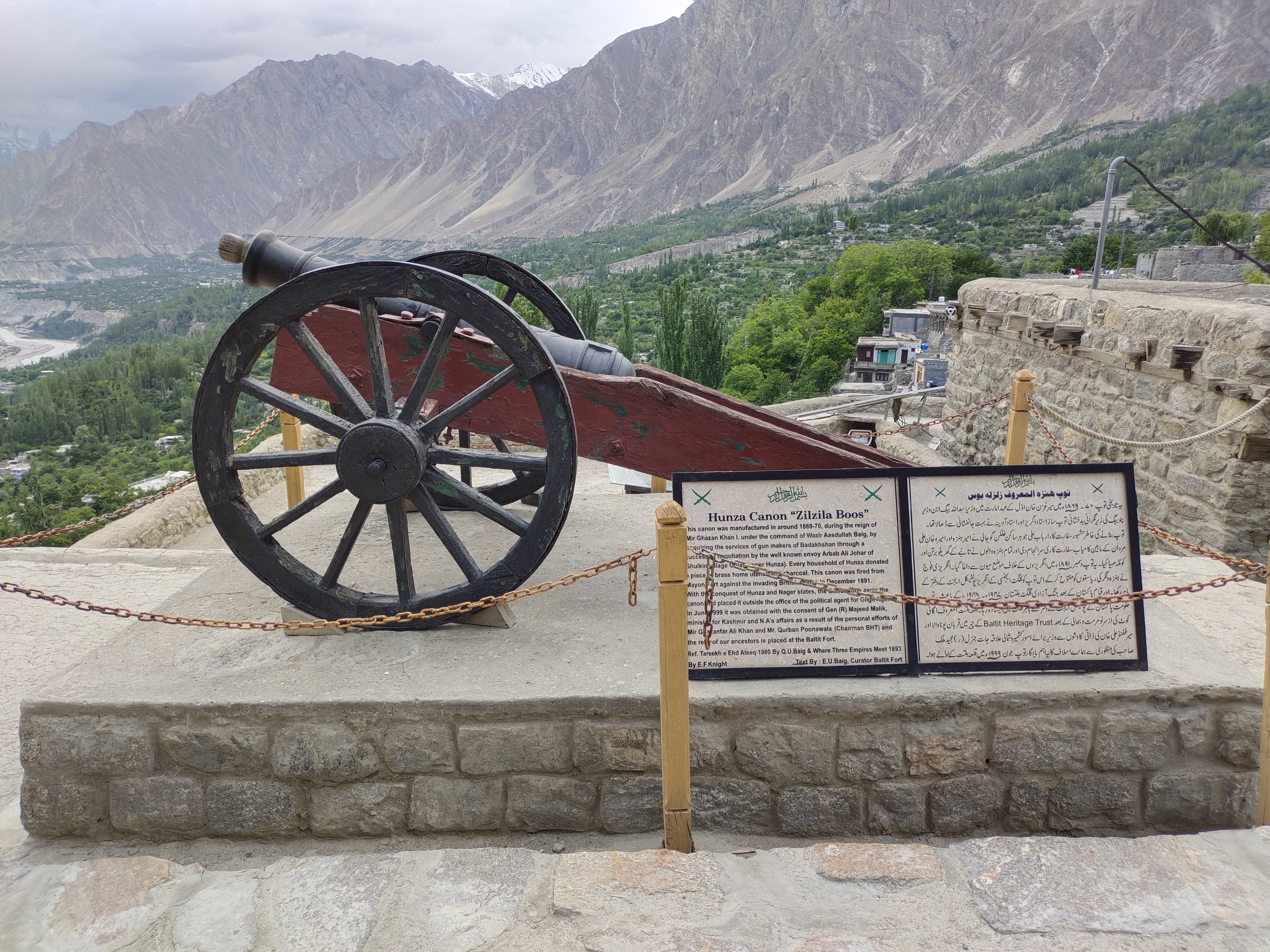
The fort's historic cannon is now on display for visitors

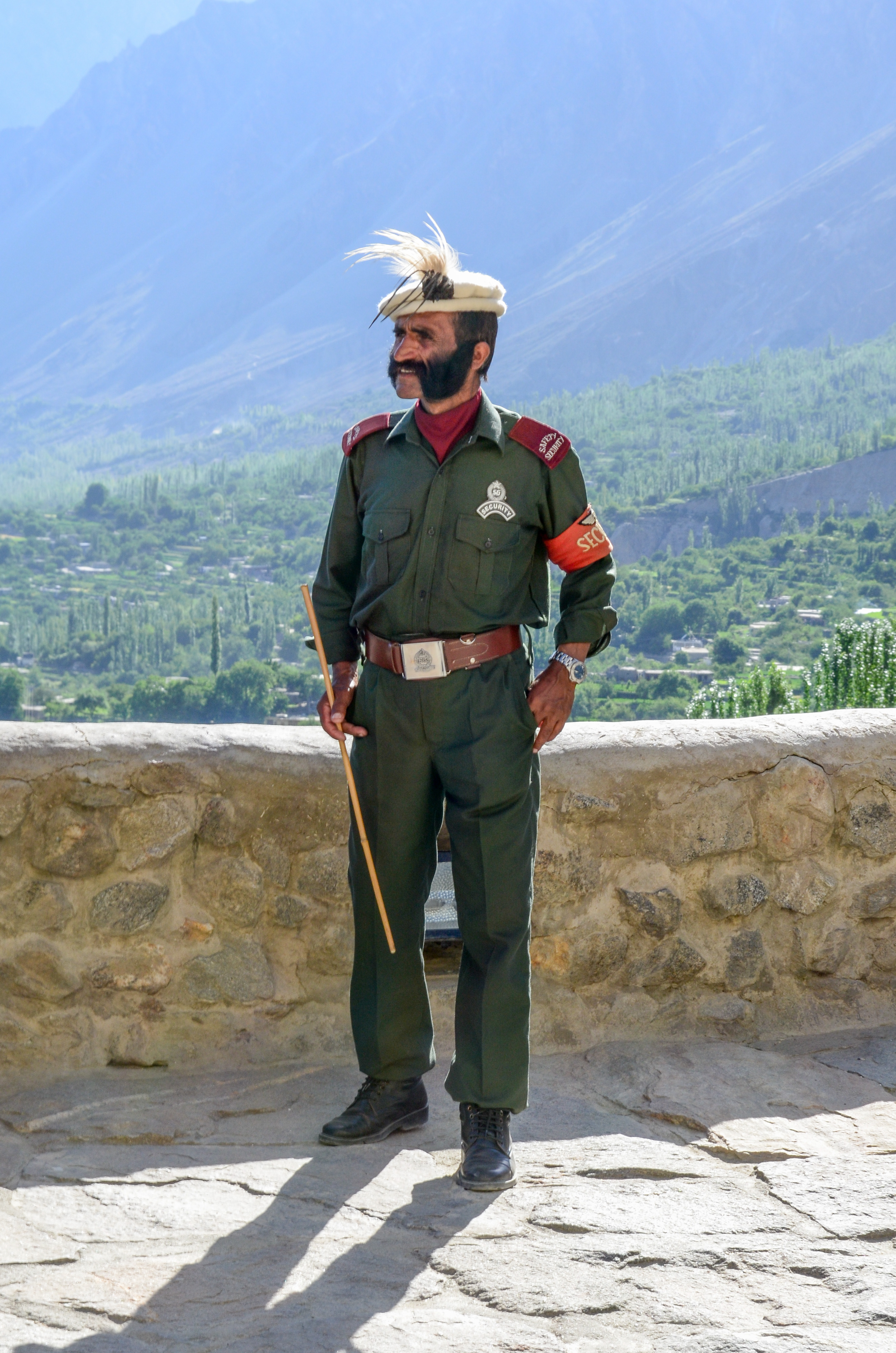
The fort's guards wear distinctive uniforms

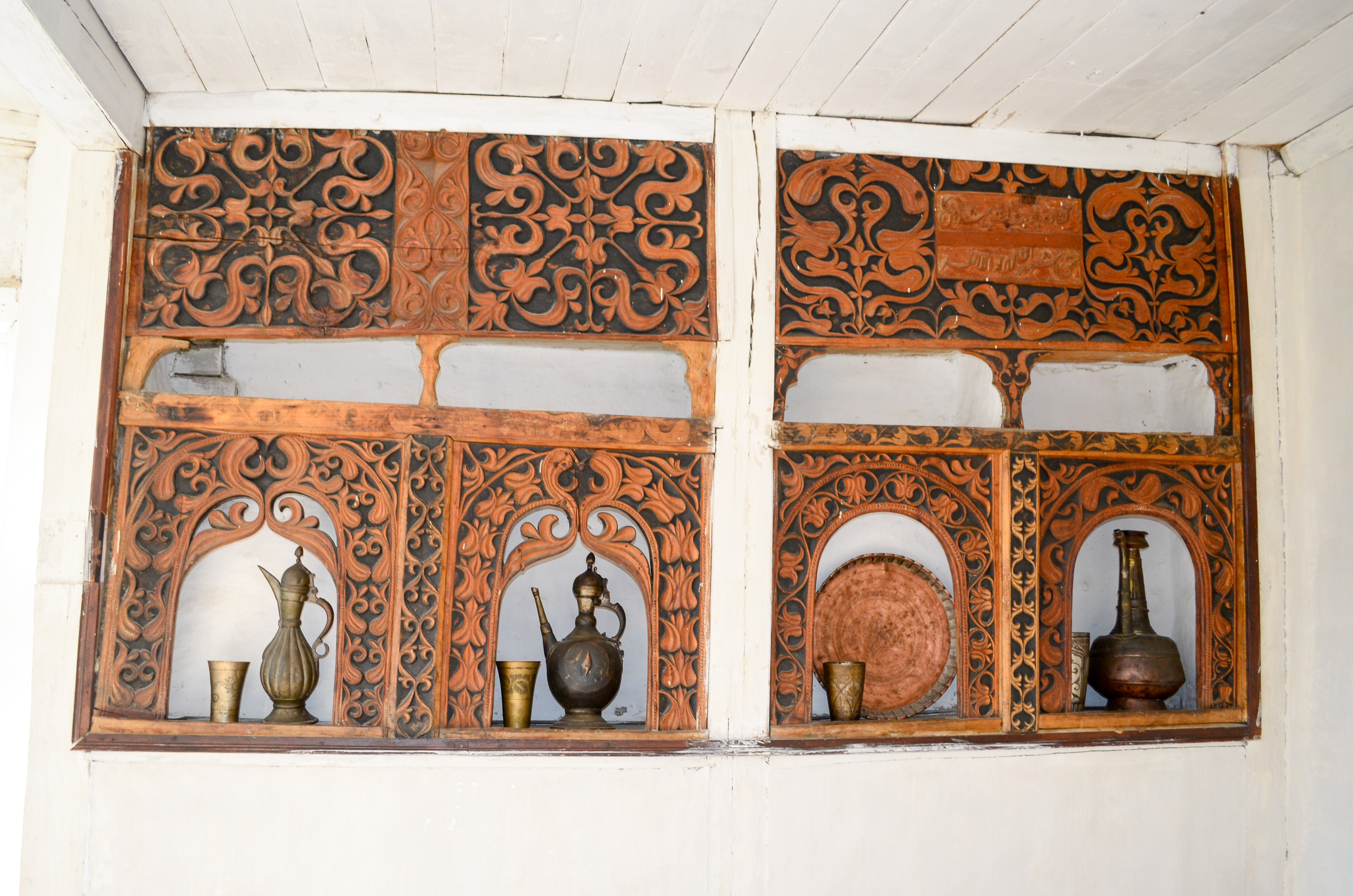
The fort displays local antiques

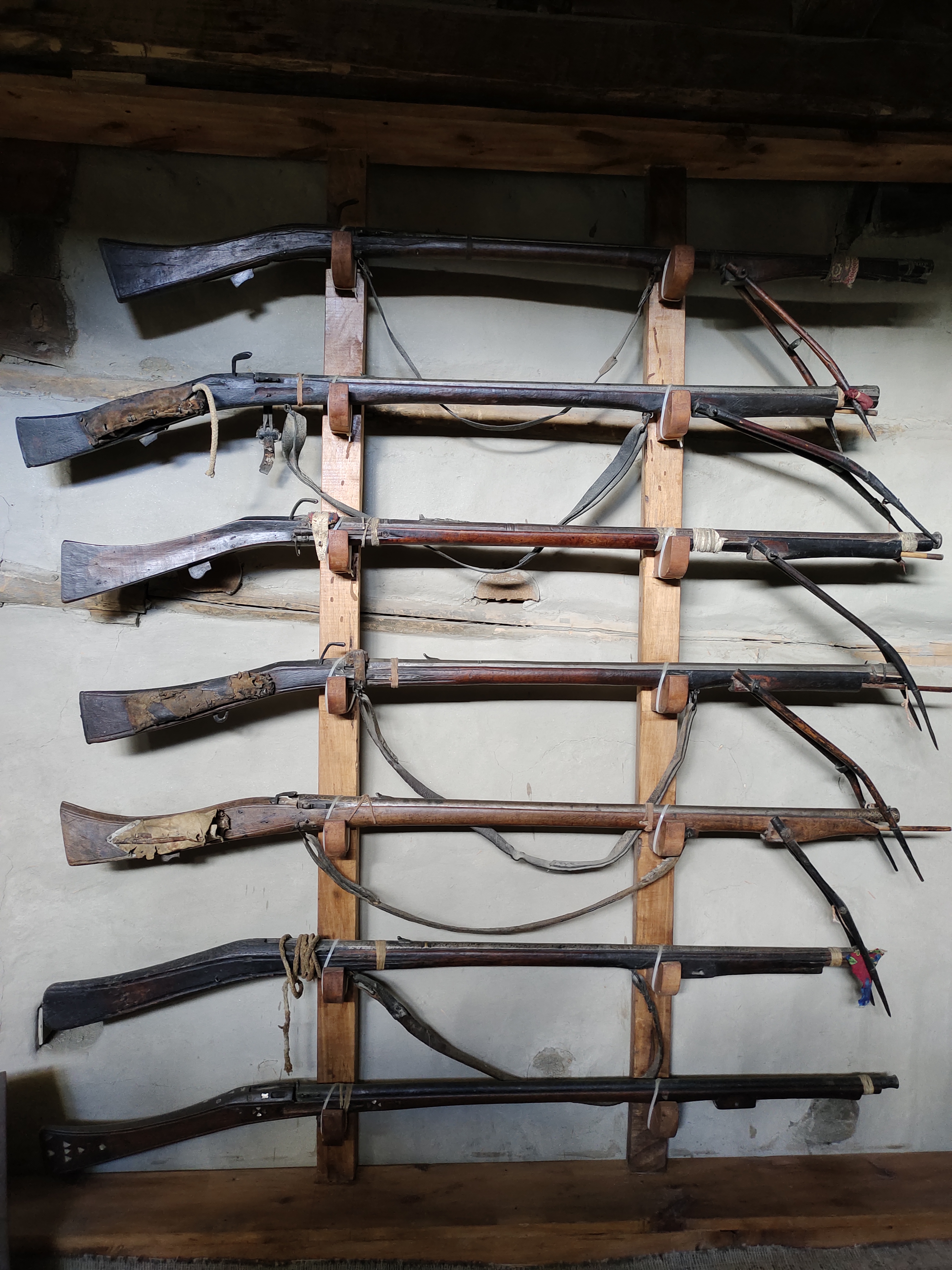
Antique Russian rifles gifted to Mir of Hunza

== Bibliography ==
- Biddulph John, Tribes of Hindoo Koosh, The Superintendent of Government Printing-Calcutta, India 1880, Reprint: Ali Kamran Publishers, Lahore-Pakistan, 1995.

== See also ==
- Altit Fort
- Shigar Fort
- Khaplu Fort
- List of forts in Pakistan
- List of museums in Pakistan
