= Sikandarabad, Gilgit–Baltistan =

Village in the Nagar District of Gilgit–Baltistan in Pakistan

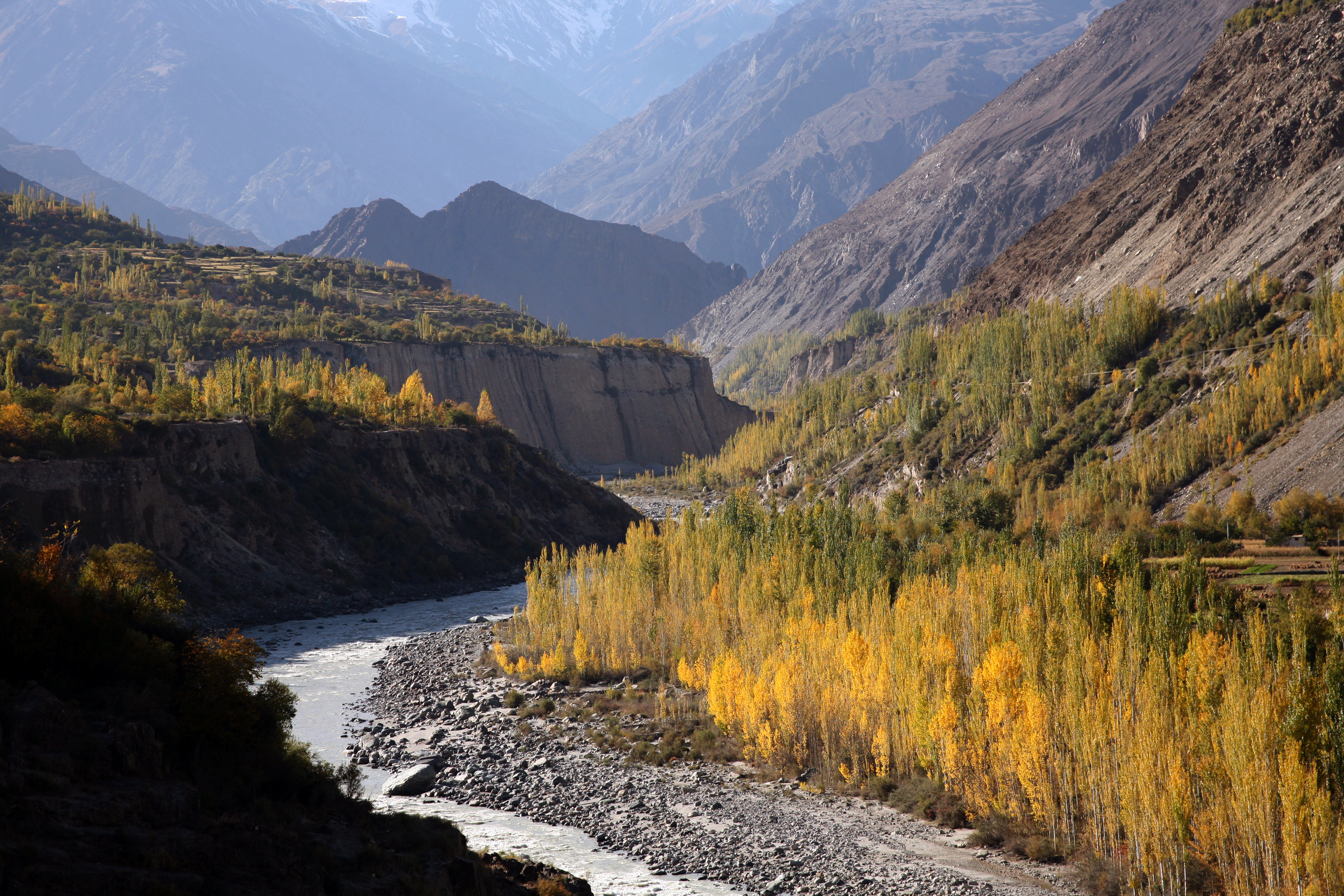

Sikandarabad (Urdu: سکندر آباد) is the headquarter of the Nagar District of Gilgit–Baltistan in Pakistan. It is also the headquarter of Nagar 2 tehsil. It is the first place in Nagar District for those entering from Gilgit district. Sikandarabad is located on the Karakoram Highway. The first view point of Rakaposhi is located in Sikanderabad which is across the Silk route of Budalas Valley to Khizerabad. Sikandarabad is a mountainous area in the Karakoram range". It is near the base camp of Rakaposhi mountain. Opposite Sikandarabad there are the great Himalaya range mountains. It contains many fruit trees and also vegetables, for example, cherry, apples, peach, apricot, potatoes, and maize. It also has dry fruits trees, for example, walnut, almond, and dry apricot. Sikandarabad Nagar is home to a population of approximately 5000 residents.
