= Altit Fort =

Coordinates: 36°18′54″N 74°40′55″E

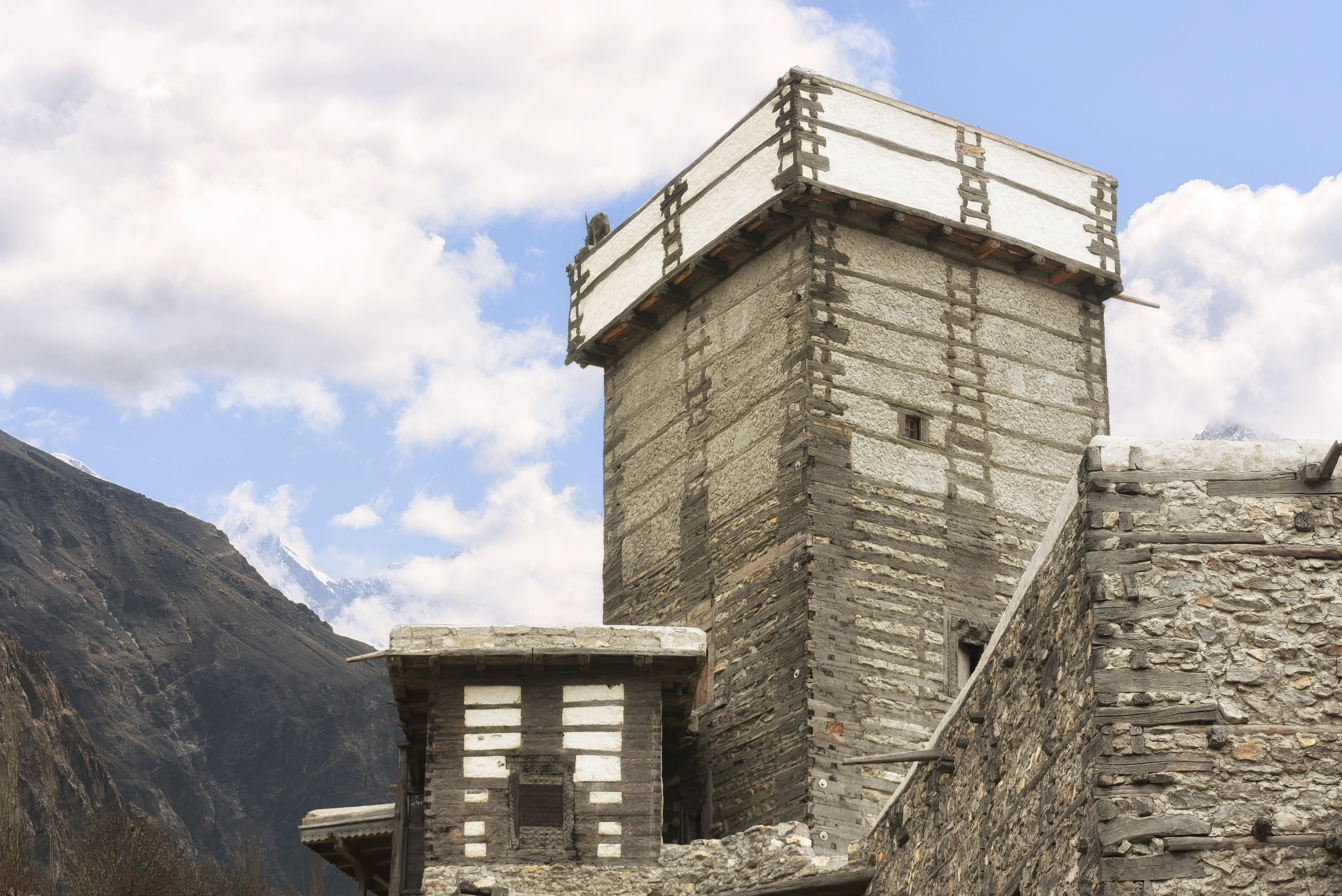
- Main tower of Altit Fort
- Interactive map of Altit Fort
- Location: Altit, Gilgit-Baltistan, Pakistan

History
- Built: 11th century

Site notes
- Restored: 2007

Altit Fort (Urdu: قلعہ التیت) is an ancient fort in the Altit town in the Hunza Valley in Gilgit-Baltistan, Pakistan. It was originally home to the hereditary rulers of the Hunza state who carried the title of 'Mir', although they moved to the nearby Baltit Fort three centuries later. Altit Fort, and in particular the Shikari Tower, is around 1100 years old, which makes it the oldest monument in Gilgit-Baltistan. The fort received the UNESCO Asia Pacific Heritage Award for Cultural Heritage Conservation in 2011.

== History ==
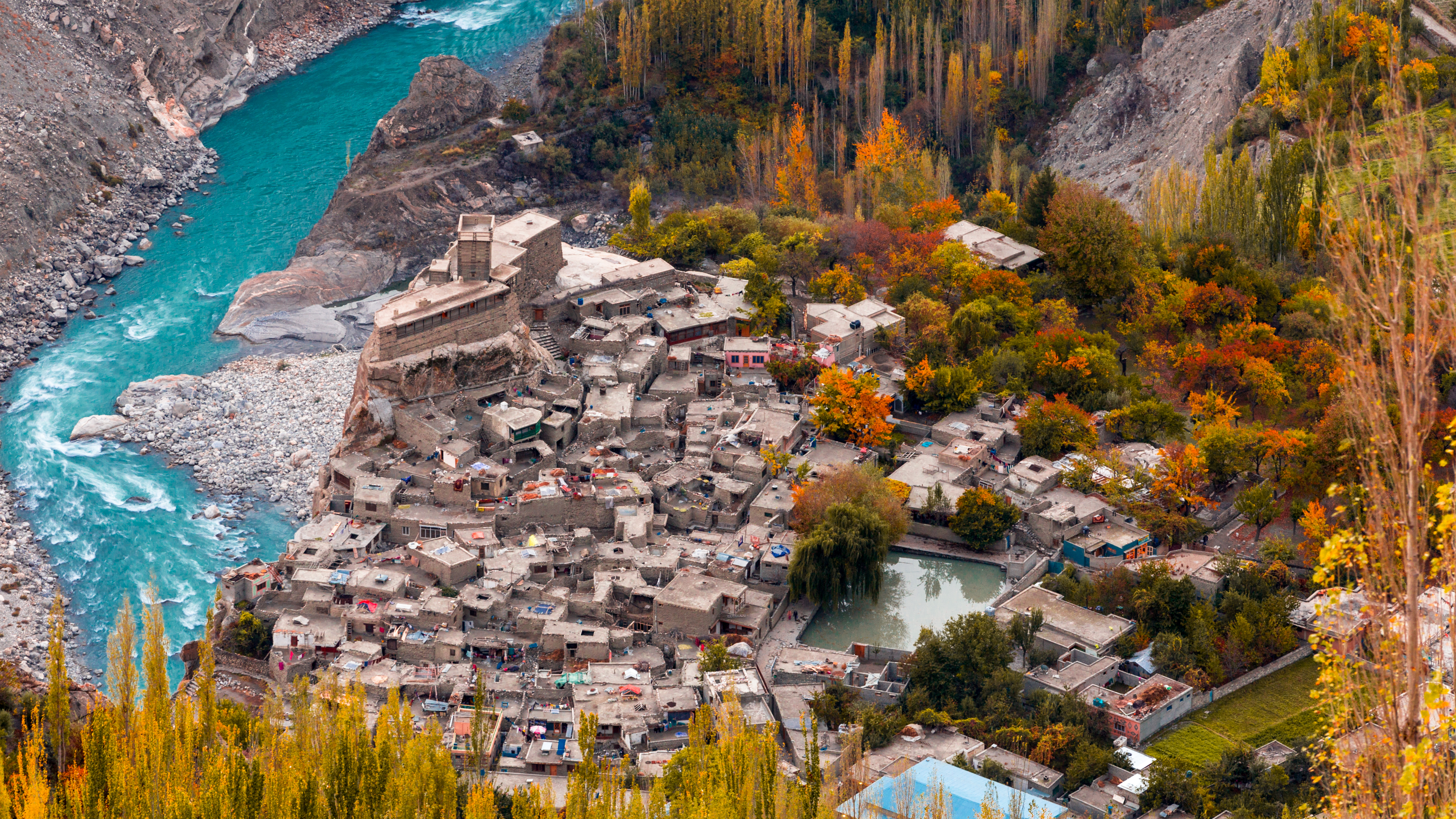
View from above the fort

The word 'Altit' means 'this side down' in Burushaski, a language isolate. The area around the fort is inhabited by Burusho people. In the 16th century, the local prince married a princess from Baltistan who brought master Balti craftsmen to build the two forts (Altit and Baltit). According to the tradition, the earliest name for Altit village was Hunukushal, meaning the 'village of Huns'. The name later changed to Broshal, translating to 'a village of Bruchiski speakers'.

== Restoration ==
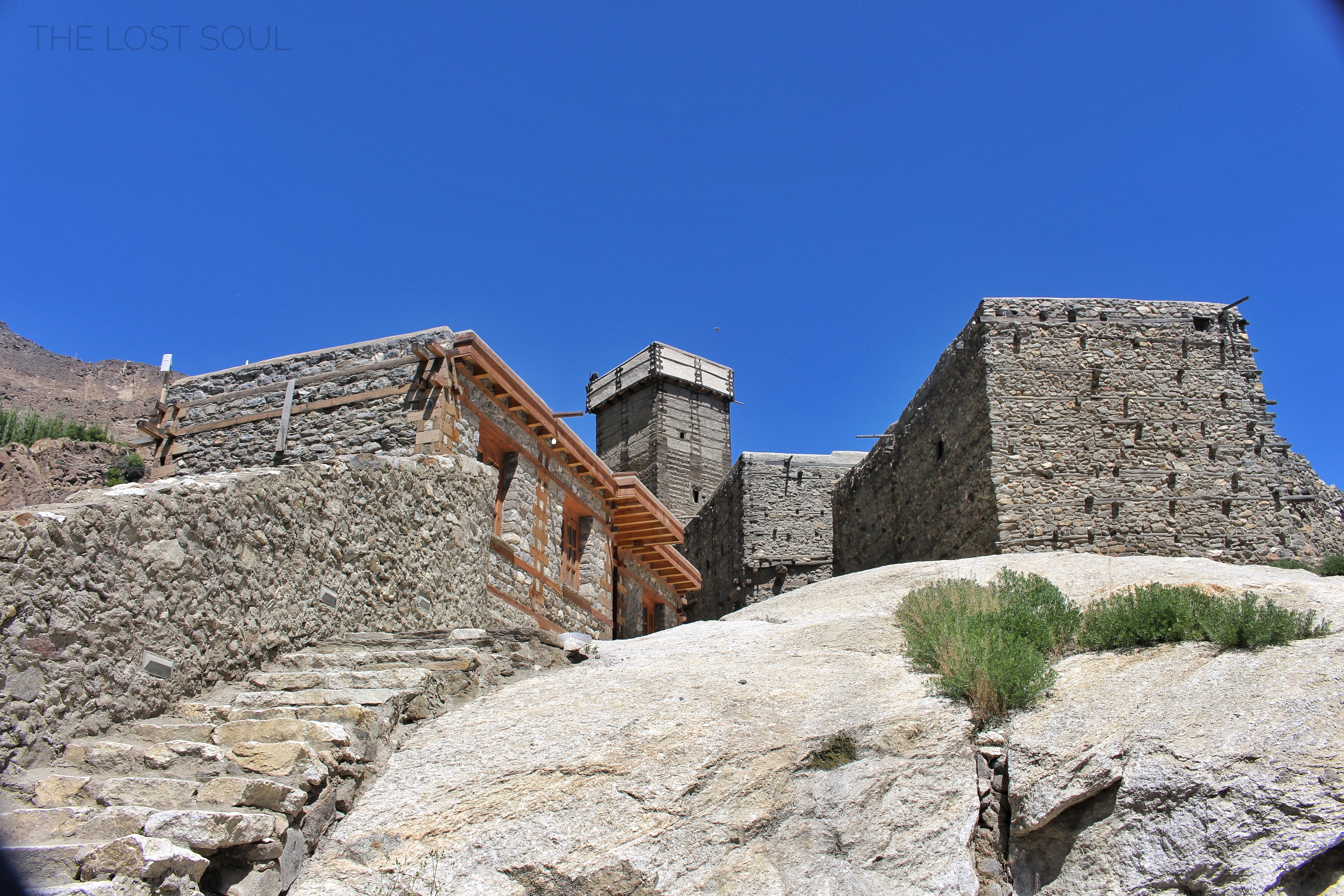

The fort remained under the local management following the Mirs' relocation to the nearby Baltit Fort. It was in poor conditions until the early 2000s when the fort was restored by the Aga Khan Trust for Culture with aid from the Government of Norway. It is characterized by small rooms and low portals with exquisite wood carvings. As a tourist site it has been open to the public since 2007.

Following the completion of the restoration process in 2010, Altit Fort was recognised with the UNESCO Asia-Pacific Award of Distinction in 2011

== Tourism ==
Altit Fort has become an important source of revenue for the local economy. As of April 2025, visitors from down country and foreigners are charged 1,600 rupees per person for a tour of the Fort, which includes a local guide. Local residents are charged 200 rupees per person.

The fort is complemented by a garden that features the Kha Basi Café. The Fort employs up to 15 people and contribute significantly to the local economy as it attracts tourists from all over the world.

== Gallery ==
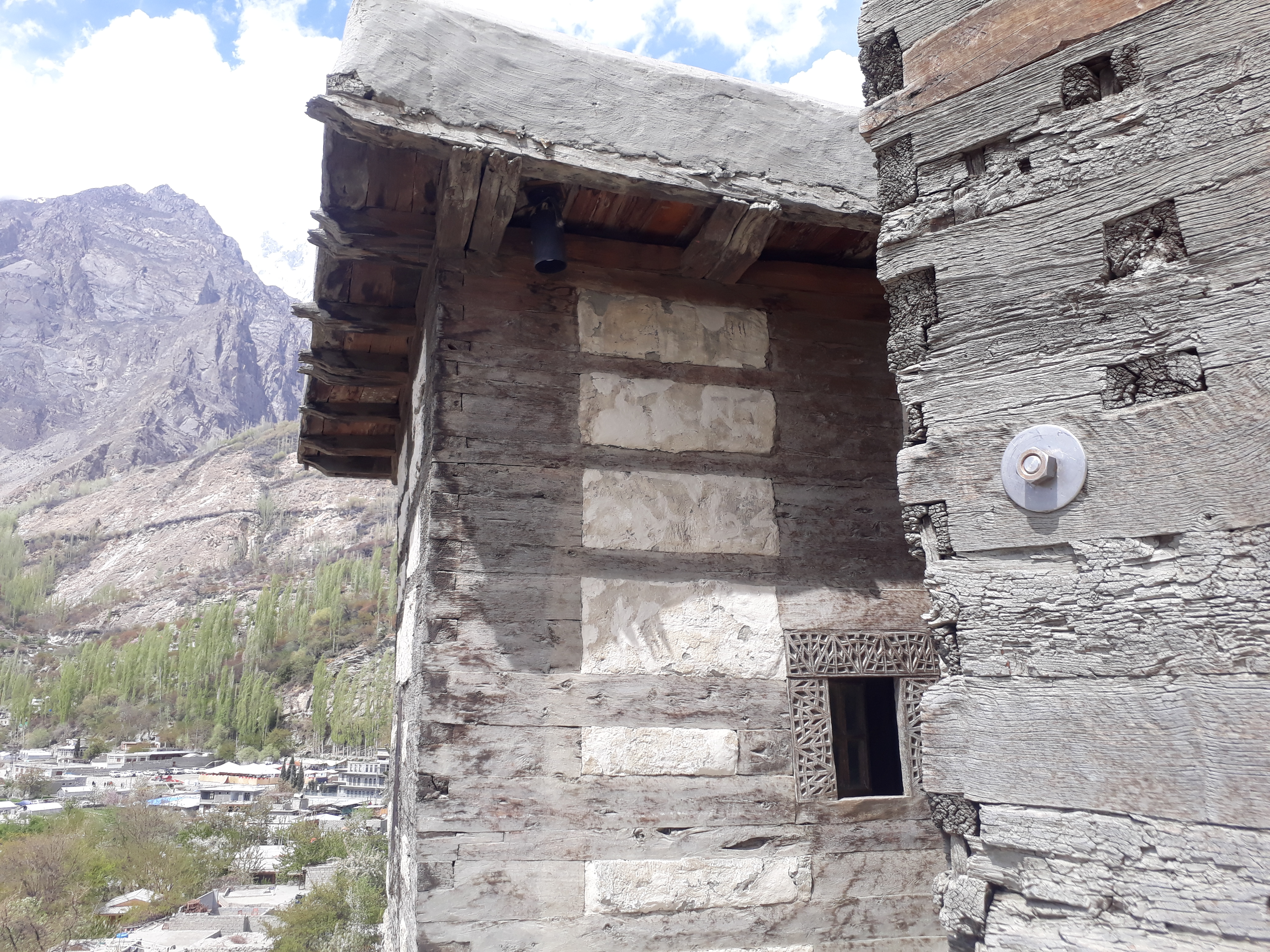
View from basement

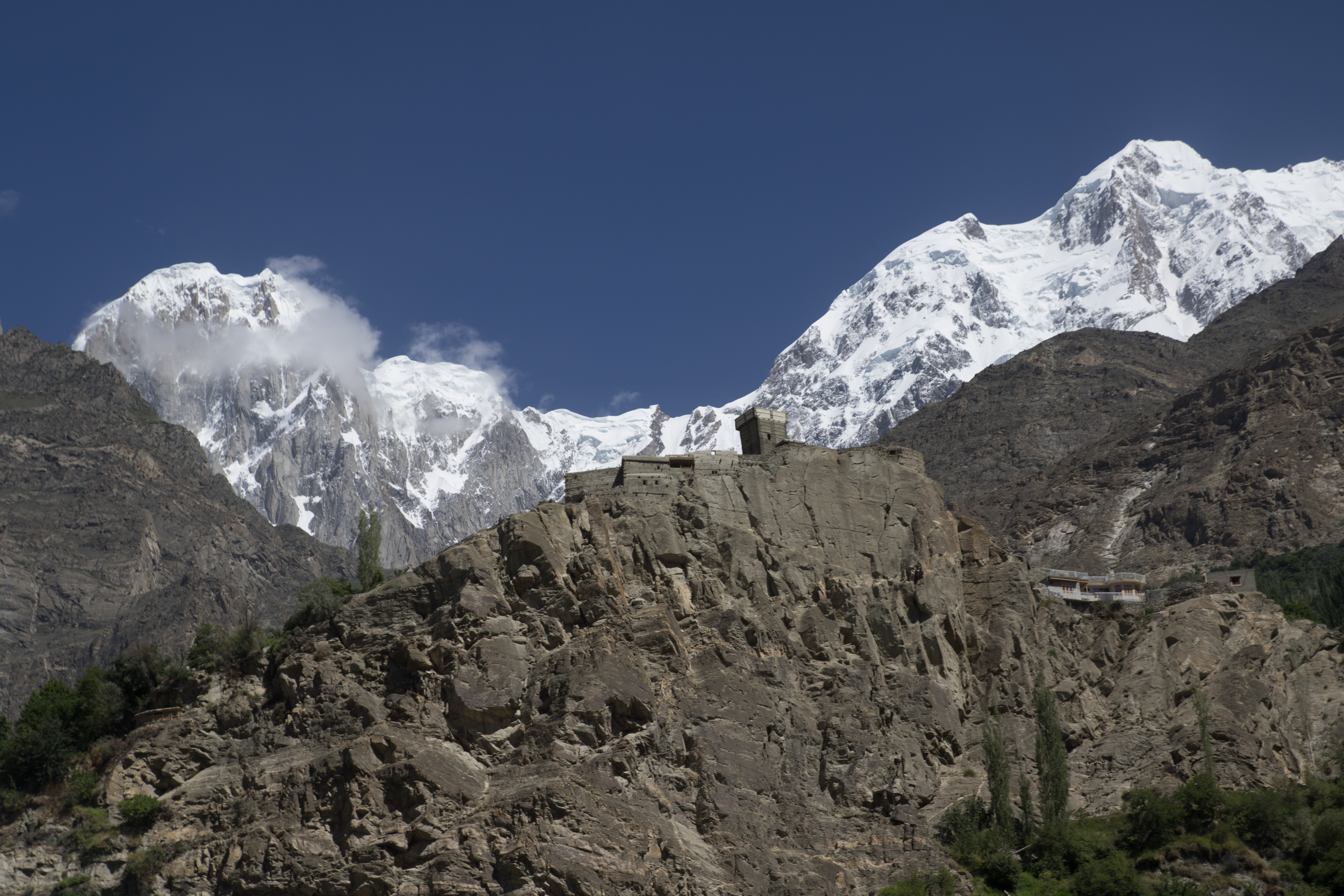
A view of the Altit Fort taken from the Karakoram Highway, Pakistan. In the background, snow-covered Hunza Peak is visible.

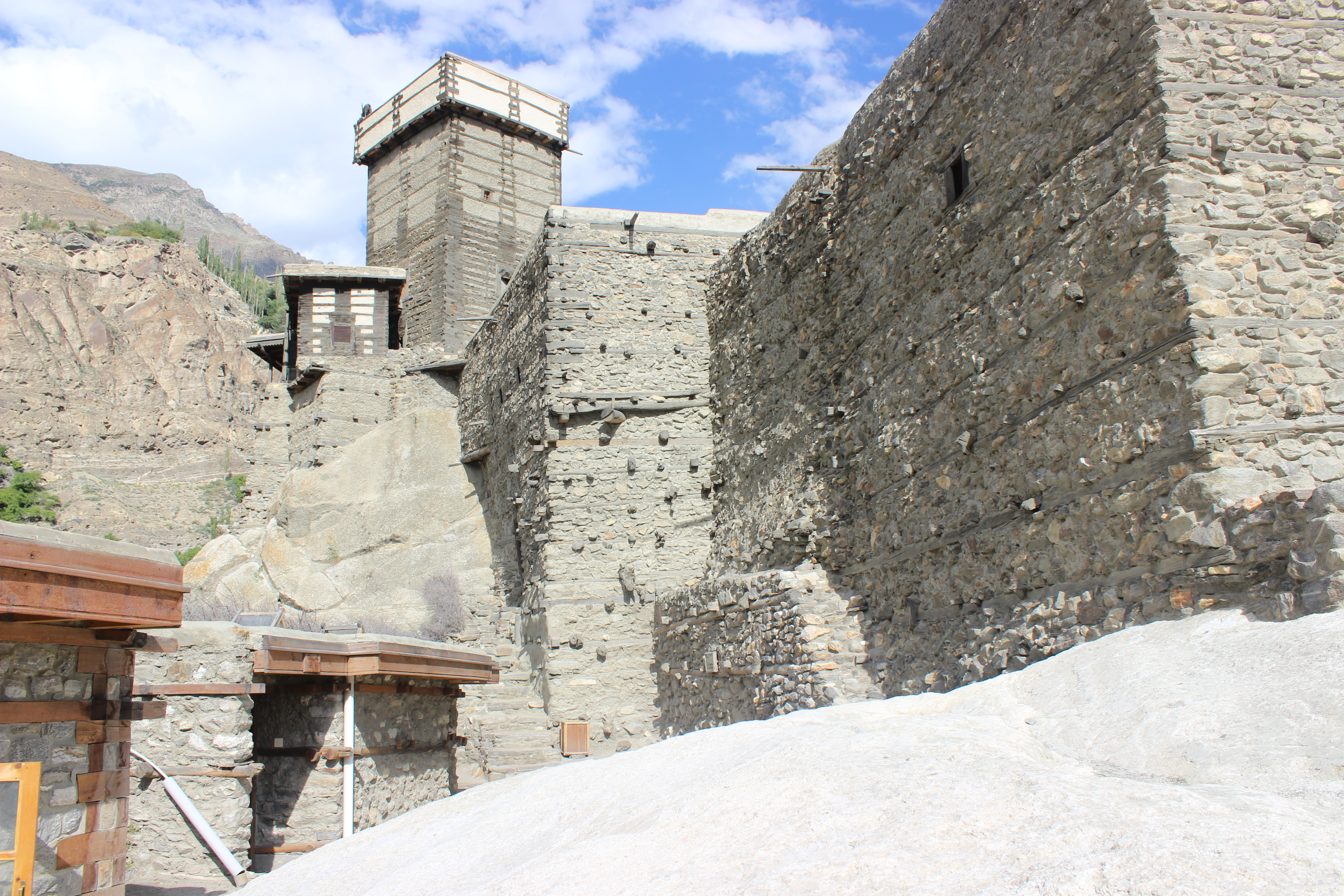
A view of fort from its base

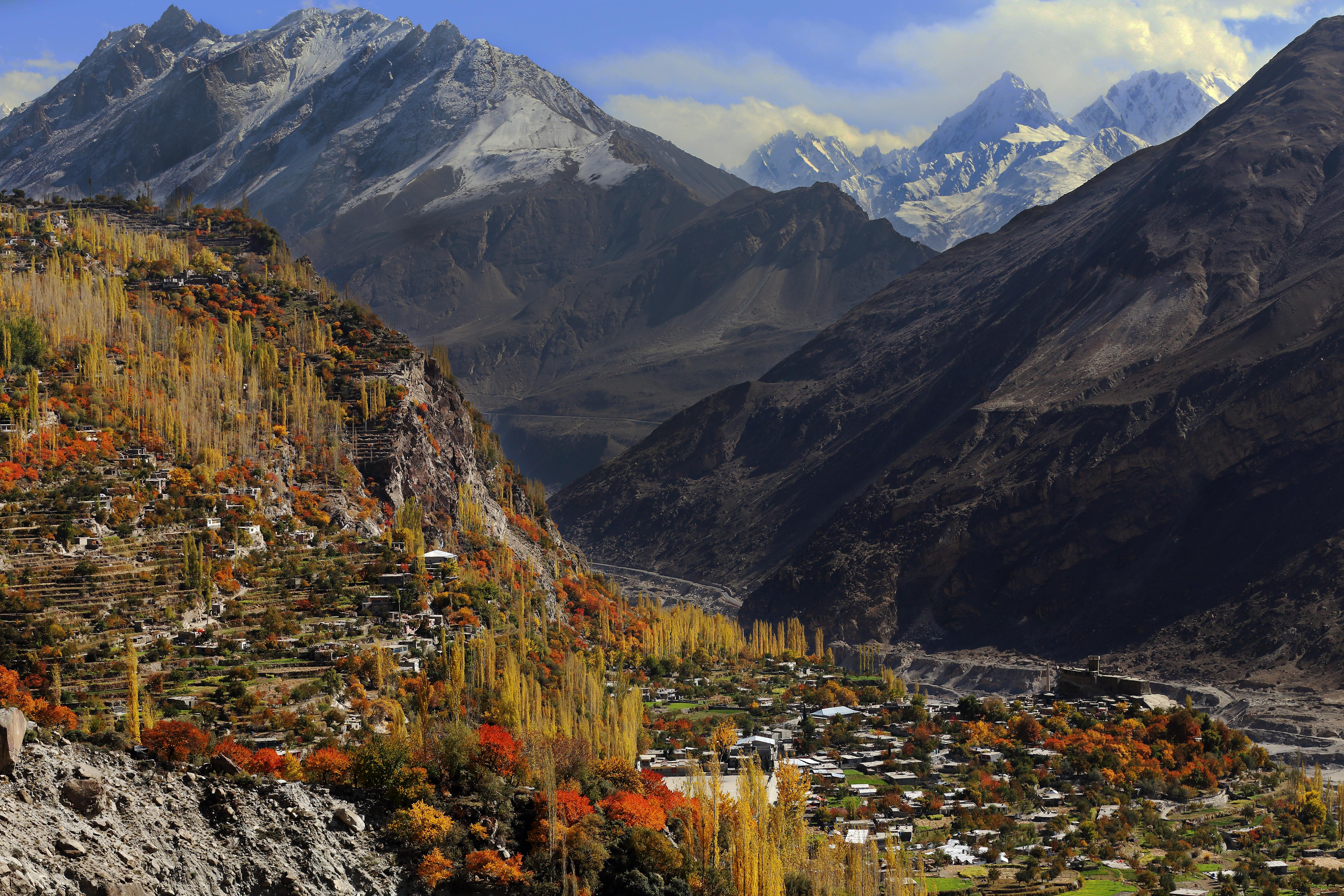
View over Hunza from the fort

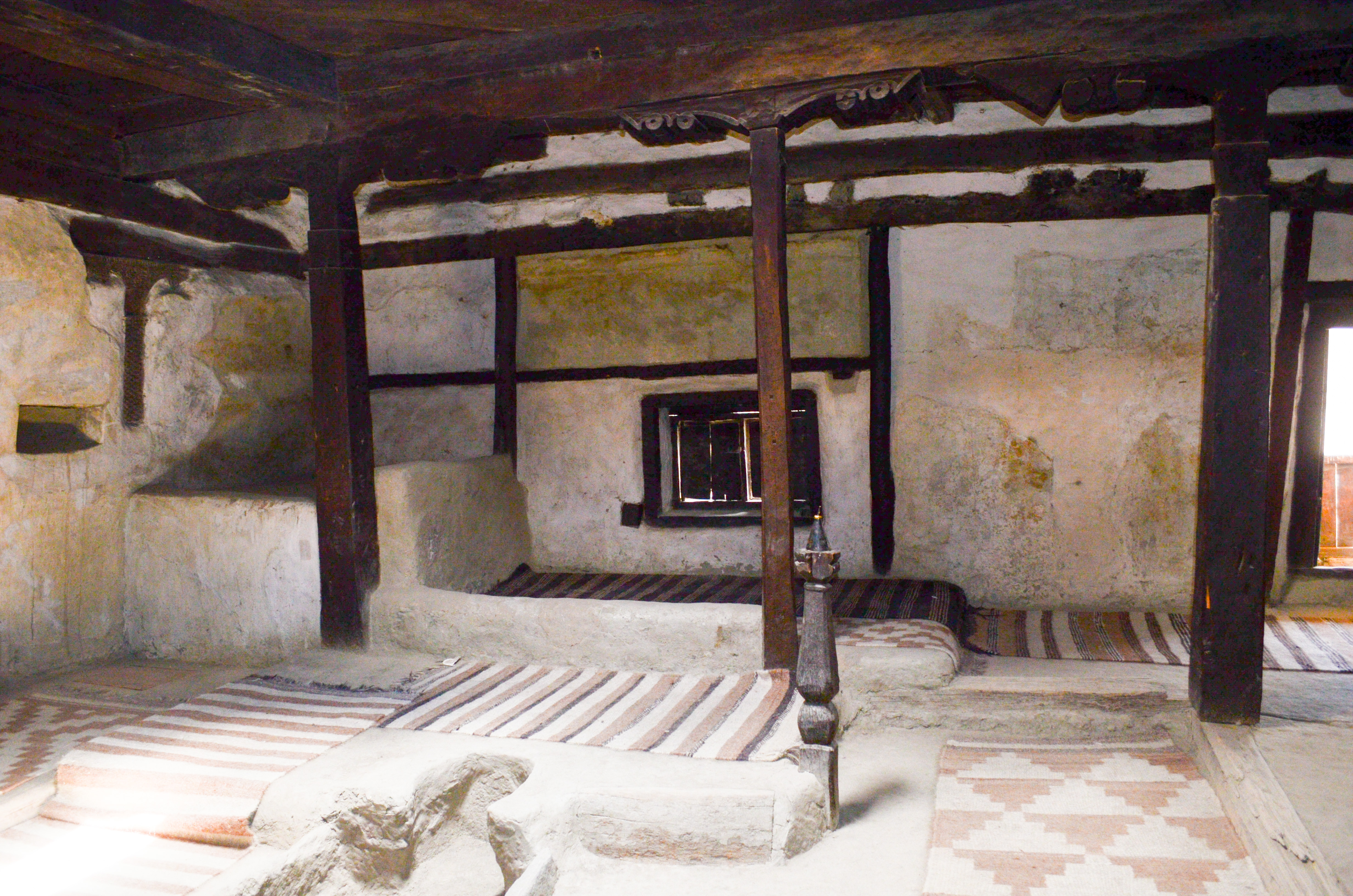
An interior view of fort

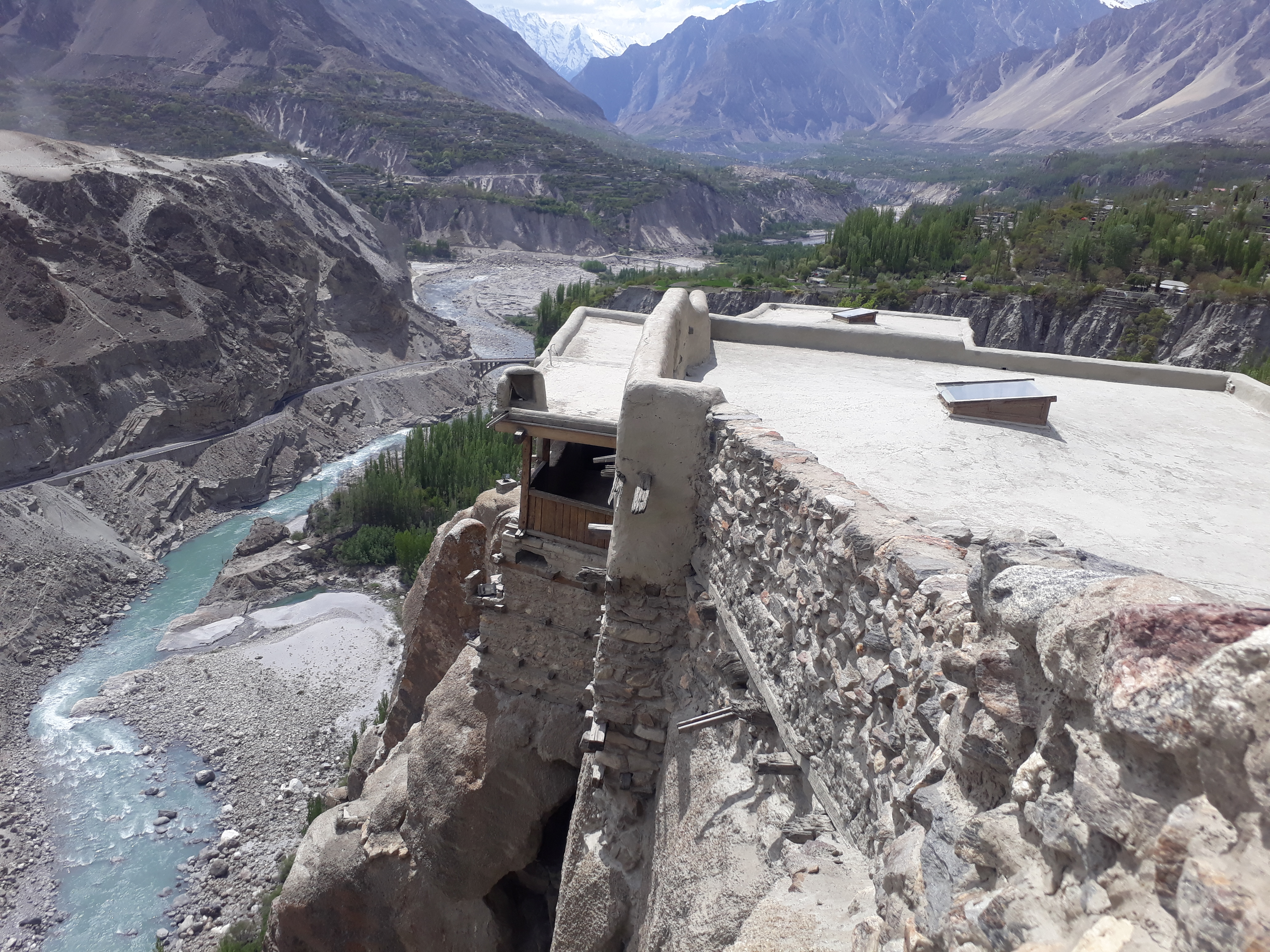
Altit fort and nearby Hunza River

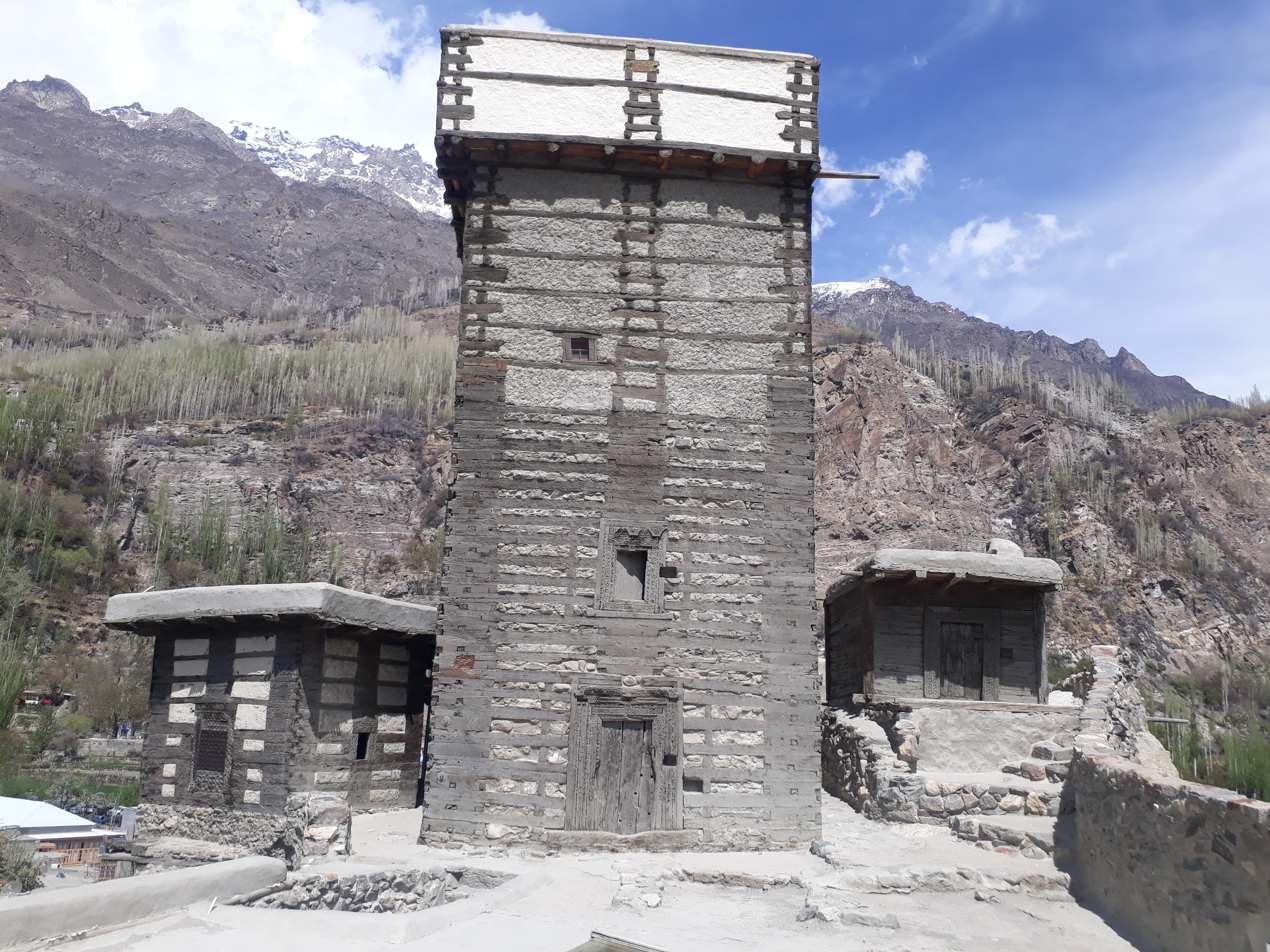
A tower made of stone and wood

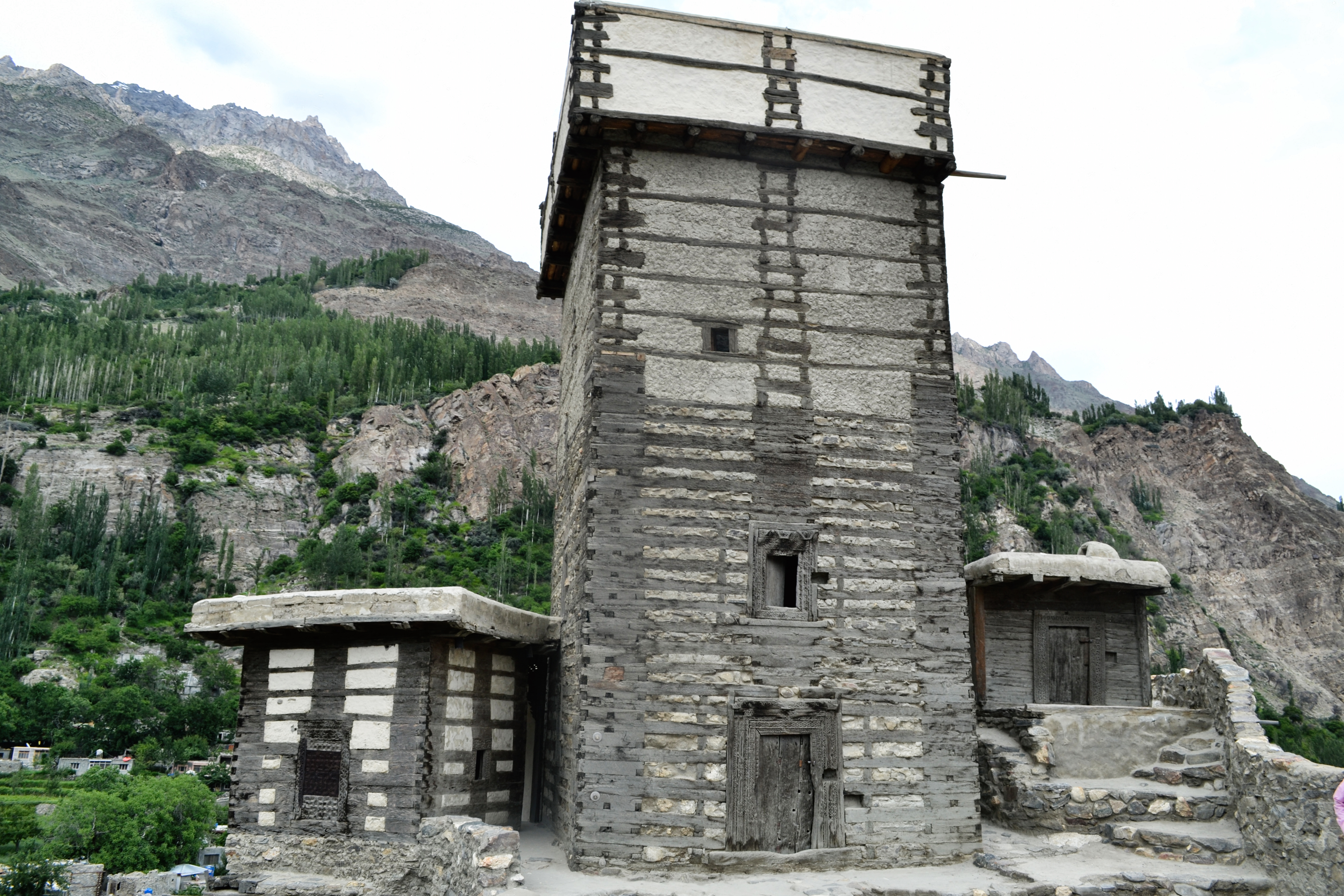
Rooftop of Altit fort

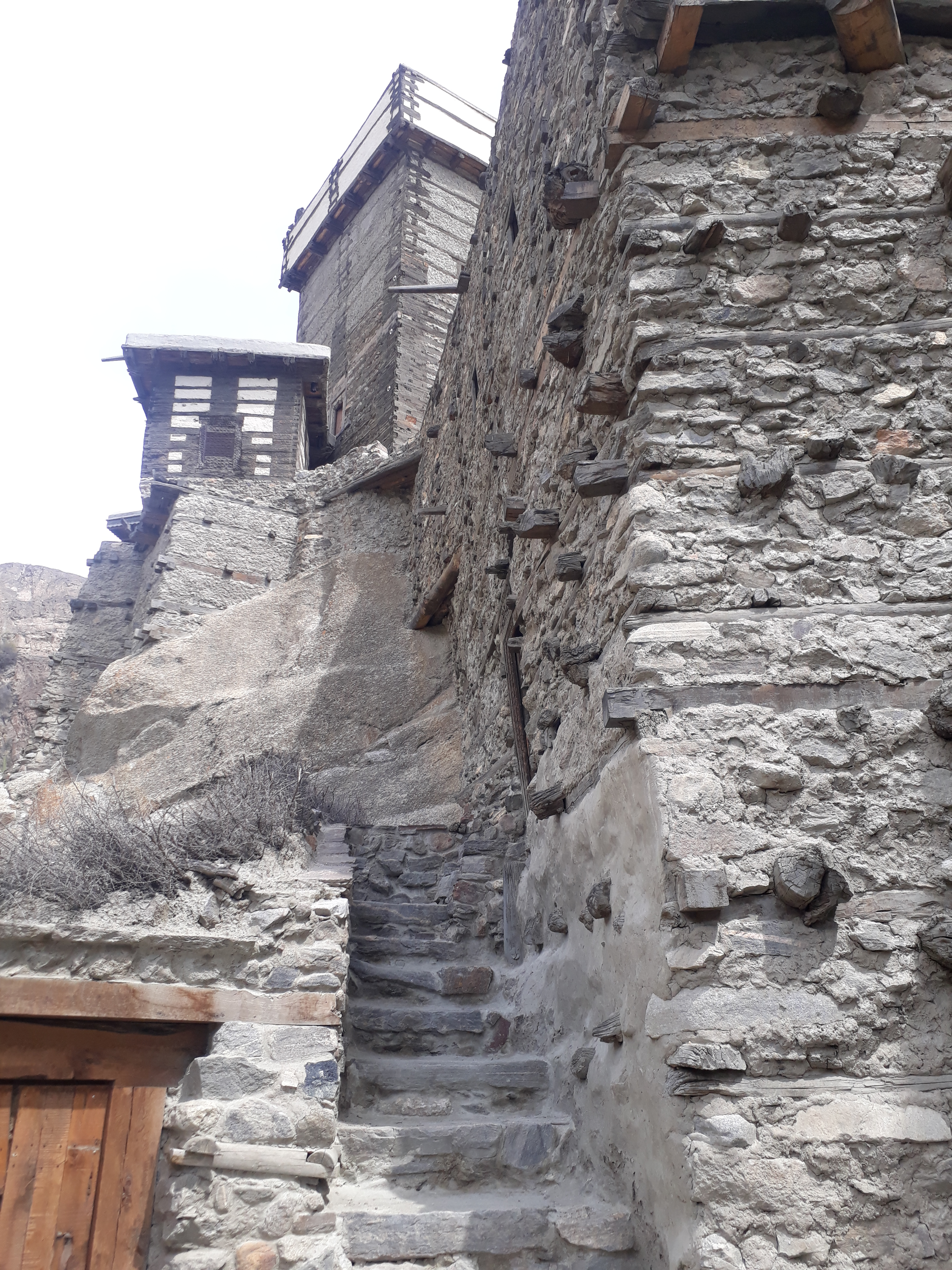
Staircase to the fort

== See also ==
- Shigar Fort
- Khaplu Fort
- Ganish
- List of forts in Pakistan
- List of museums in Pakistan
