= List of forts in Pakistan =

The following is a partial list of forts and castles in Pakistan:

Name	Location	Province/Region	Date of Completion	Built by	Image	Notes
Baghsar Fort	Bhimber District	Azad Kashmir		Mughal Empire		Currently closed to visitors, due to it being right beside Line of Control between Pakistan and India.
Throchi Fort	Kotli District	Azad Kashmir	1460			
Ramkot Fort	Mirpur District	Azad Kashmir	16–17th Century	Gakhars		
Red Fort, Muzaffarabad	Muzaffarabad District	Azad Kashmir	1646	Sultan Muzaffar Khan		Locally, it is known as the "Rutta Qila" or just "qila".
Karjai Fort	Kotli District	Azad Kashmir				
Mangla Fort	Mirpur District	Azad Kashmir				
Kharan Fort	Kharan District	Balochistan		British Raj		
Sandeman Fort	Zhob District	Balochistan	1867			Also known as Zhob Fort.
Kalat Fort	Kalat District	Balochistan		Khanate of Kalat		The town of Kalat is said to have been founded by and named Qalat-e Sewa (Sewa's Fort), after Sewa, a legendary hero of the Baloch people.
Sassi Punnu Fort	Turbat District	Balochistan				Also known as "Meeri Kalaat". Location 26°2′2″N 63°00′46″E
Sibi Fort	Sibi District	Balochistan				
Baltit Fort	Hunza District	Gilgit Baltistan				Since 2004, it has been on the UNESCO World Heritage Tentative list.
Skardu Fort	Skardu District	Gilgit Baltistan				
Altit Fort	Hunza District	Gilgit Baltistan	11th Century			
Shigar Fort	Shigar District	Gilgit Baltistan	17th Century	Amacha Dynasty		The Shigar Fort means The Fort on Rock.
Khaplu Fort	Ghanche District	Gilgit Baltistan				It is locally known as Yabgo Khar, meaning "The fort on the roof".
Kalam Darchi Fort	Hunza District	Gilgit Baltistan	1933	British Raj		This fort was named after a naked saint and was built by British soldiers during 1932–33 to check the invasion and inflow of people from China and USSR through Wahkan corridor. It remained the abode of Gilgit Scouts.
Shagai Fort	Khyber District	Khyber Pakhtunkhwa	1927			
Harkishan Garh Fort	Haripur District	Khyber Pakhtunkhwa	1822–23	Sikh Empire		
Fort Munro	D.G.Khan	Punjab	1800	British Raj	Damis Lake, Fort Munro	Locally, it is known as the "South Punjab Murree".
Bala Hisar Fort	Peshawar District	Khyber Pakhtunkhwa				also known as Qila Balahisar
Chitral Fort	Chitral District	Khyber Pakhtunkhwa	Chitral State			35°51′19″N 71°47′30″E
Mastuj Fort	Chitral District	Khyber Pakhtunkhwa				
Chakdarra Fort	Lower Dir District	Khyber Pakhtunkhwa	1586	Mughal Empire		The Mughals built a fort here in 1586, occupied in 1895 by the British, who built the present fort in 1896. 34°38′50″N 72°01′42″E
Birmoghlasht Summer Fort	Lower Chitral District	Khyber Pakhtunkhwa				
Malakand Fort	Malakand District	Khyber Pakhtunkhwa				
Handyside Fort	Kohat District	Khyber Pakhtunkhwa		British Raj		
Jamrud Fort	Khyber District	Khyber Pakhtunkhwa	1836	Sikh Empire		
Ali Masjid Fort	Khyber District	Khyber Pakhtunkhwa	1837	Dost Mohammad Khan		
Sangni Fort	Rawalpindi District	Punjab	19th Century	Sikh Empire		
Sialkot Fort	Sialkot District	Punjab	2nd Century	Raja Sálbán		
Attock Fort	Attock District	Punjab	1583	Mughal Emperor Akbar		Attock Fort was built at Attock Khurd during the reign of Akbar the Great from 1581 to 1583 under the supervision of Khawaja Shamsuddin Khawafi to protect the passage of the River Indus.
Rohtas Fort	Jhelum District	Punjab	16th Century	Sher Shah Suri		
Derawar Fort	Bahawalpur District	Punjab	Rajput			
Lahore Fort	Lahore District	Punjab	1605	Mughal Emperor Akbar		
Malot Fort	Chakwal District	Punjab	1527	Mughal Emperor Babur		
Pharwala Castle	Rawalpindi District	Punjab	15th Century	Gakhars		
Sheikhupura Fort	Sheikhupura	Punjab	1607	Mughal Emperor Jahangir		
Rawat Fort	Rawalpindi District	Punjab		Gakhars		
Islamgarh Fort	Rahim Yar Khan District	Punjab	1665	Rajput Raja Rawal Siri Bheem Singh		
Moj Garh Fort	Bahawalnagar District	Punjab		Rajput		
Bijnot Fort	Bahawalpur District	Punjab				
Deen Garh Fort						
Multan Fort	Multan District	Punjab	800 - 1000 BC			The fort was destroyed by British forces.
Mankera Fort	Bhakkar District	Punjab				
Marot Fort	Bahawalnagar District	Punjab				A ruined fortress town. 29°10′37″N 72°26′00″E
Fort Abbas	Bahawalnagar District	Punjab				
Nandana Fort	Jhelum District	Punjab				Al-Beruni (973-1053 AD), the celebrated traveler, historian, philosopher, mathematician, astronomer and scientist, came to the subcontinent in the period of Mehmood of Ghazni during the 11th century. It was at Nandana, that he measured the circumference of the earth.
Satghara	Okara District	Punjab				It is also believed to be the location of the tomb of Baloch king, Mir Chakar Rind (1468–1565).
Kot Diji Fort	Khairpur District	Sindh	1795	Mir Sohrab Khan Talpur		
Ranikot Fort	Jamshoro District	Sindh	17th Century			Ranikot Fort is also known as The Great Wall of Sindh and is believed to be the world's largest fort with a circumference of approximately 26 kilometres (16 mi). Since 1993, it has been on the tentative list of UNESCO World Heritage Sites.
Naukot Fort	Tharparkar District	Sindh				
Bukkur Fort	Sukkur District	Sindh				27°41′46″N 68°53′3″E
Dalel Dero Fort	Shaheed Benazirabad District	Sindh				
Sehwan Fort	Jamshoro District	Sindh				
Qasim Fort	Karachi District	Sindh	18th Century CE	Talpur dynasty		
Pacco Qillo	Hyderabad District	Sindh	1768	Mian Ghulam Shah Kalhoro		
Umerkot Fort	Umerkot District	Sindh		Rajput		

== See also ==
- Tourism in Pakistan
- List of UNESCO World Heritage Sites in Pakistan
- List of museums in Pakistan
- Lahore Fort
- Rohtas Fort
- Noor Mahal
- Derawar Fort

== Sources ==
- Hasan, S. Khurshid (2005). Historical Forts in Pakistan (PDF). Islamabad: National Institute of Historical & Cultural Research Centre of Excellence, Quaid-i-Azam University. ISBN 969-415-069-8.
