= List of palaces in Pakistan =

This is a list of notable palaces in Pakistan.

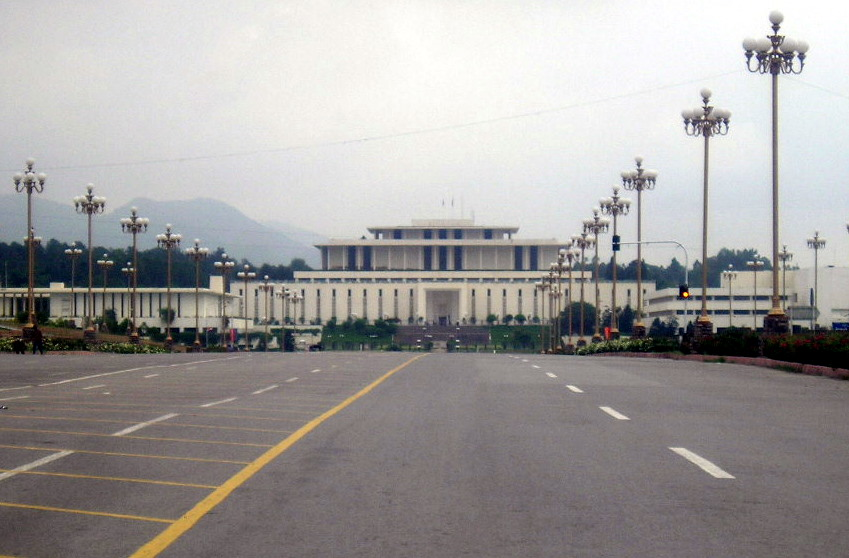
President's palace in Islamabad

== A ==
- Aiwan-e-Sadr
- Altit Palace

== B ==
- Bedi Mahal
- Baltit Palace
- Barood Khana Haveli

== C ==
- Chitral Palace

== F ==
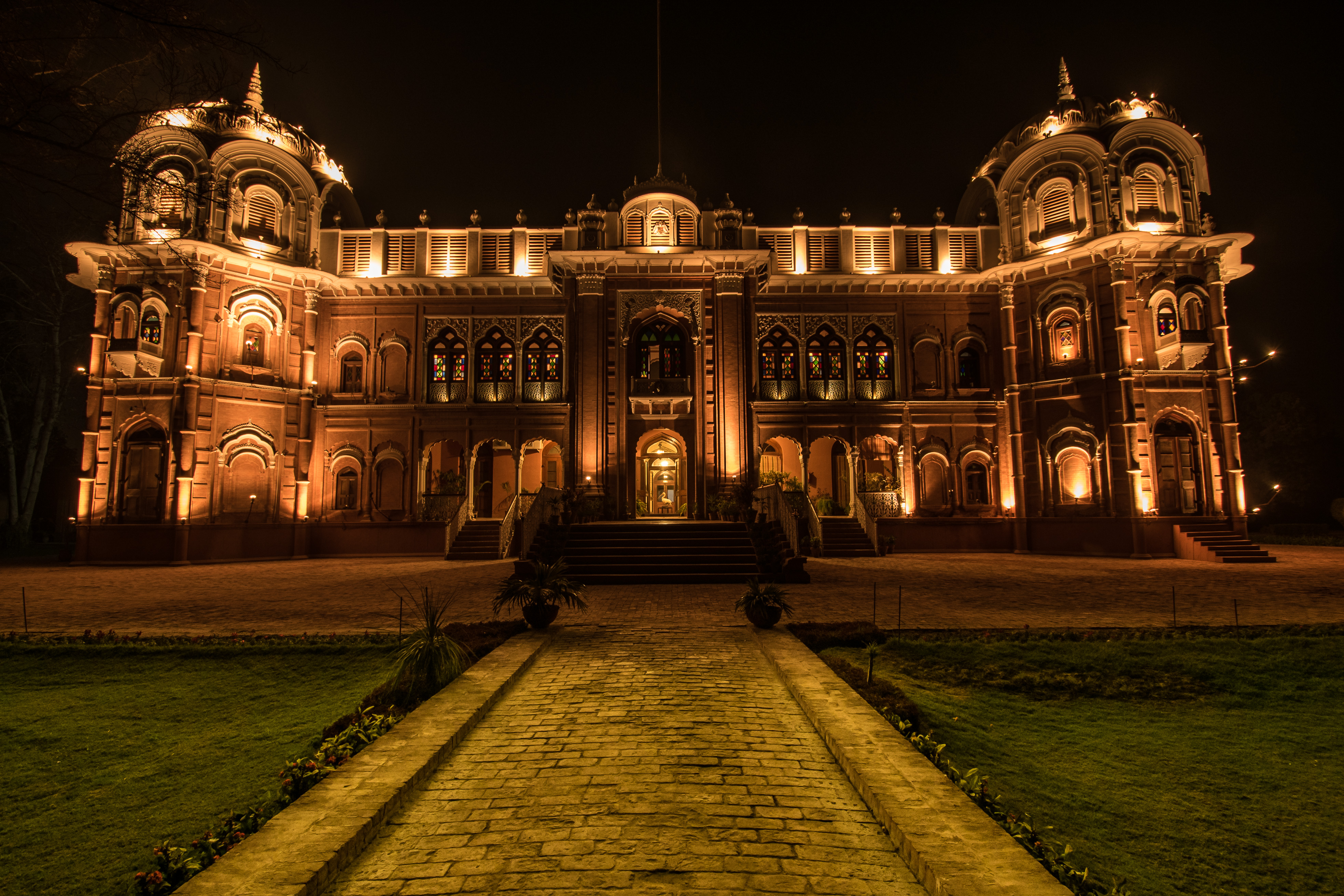
Darbar Mahal in Bahawalpur

- Faiz Mahal

== G ==
- Gulzar Mahal

== K ==
- Khaplu Palace

== H ==
- Hari Singh Nalwa Haveli

== L ==
- Lal Haveli

== M ==
- Mohatta Palace

== N ==
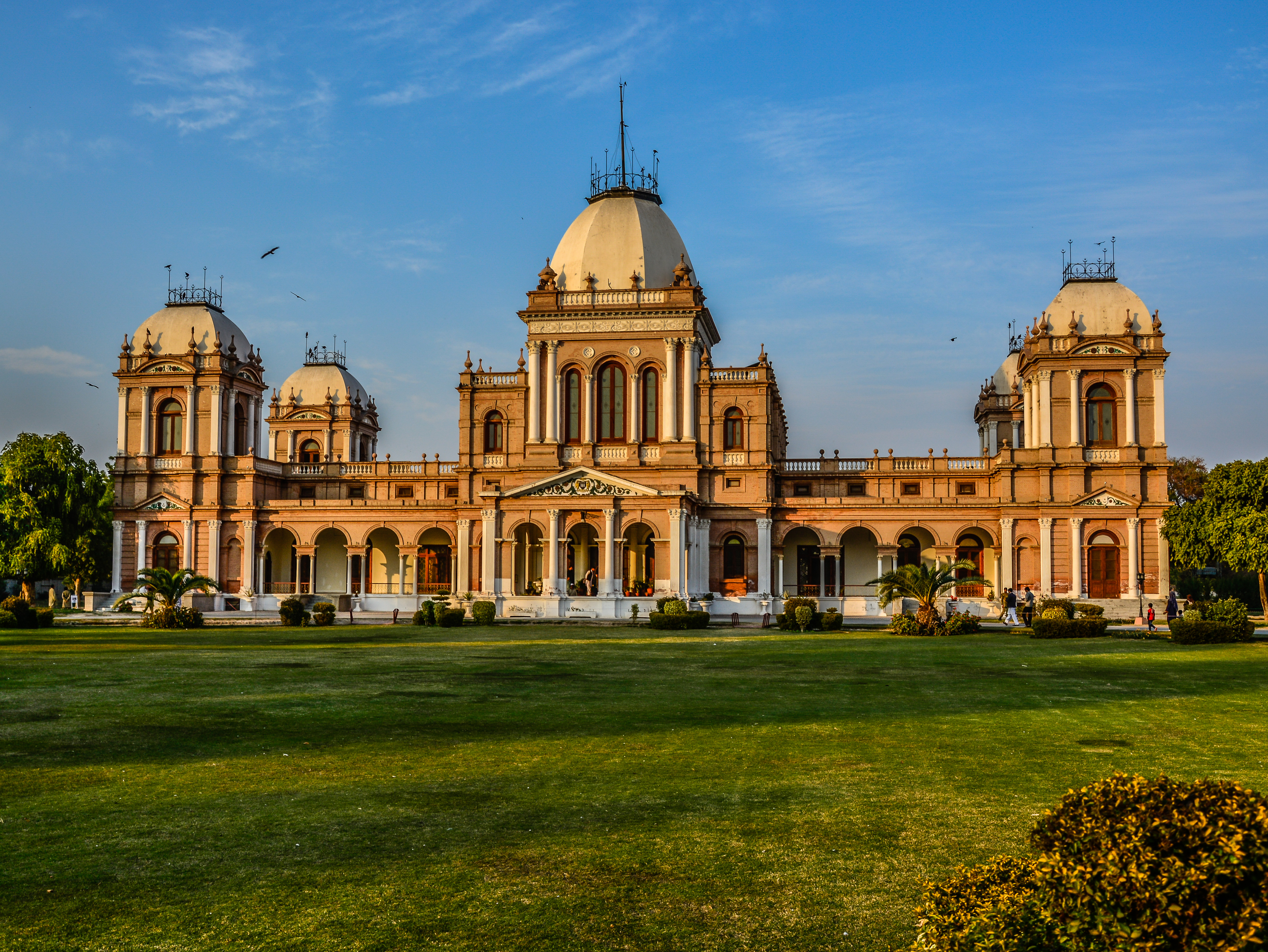
Noor Mahal in Bahawalpur

- Noor Mahal
- Nau Nihal Singh Haveli

== O ==
- Omar Hayat Mahal

== P ==
- Prime Minister House, Pakistan
- Punjab House

== R ==
- Raiwand Palace

== S ==
- Sheesh Mahal
- Shigar Palace
- Sujan Singh Haveli

== W ==
- White Palace (Marghazar)
