= Gulzar Mahal =

Gulzar Mahal گلزار محل
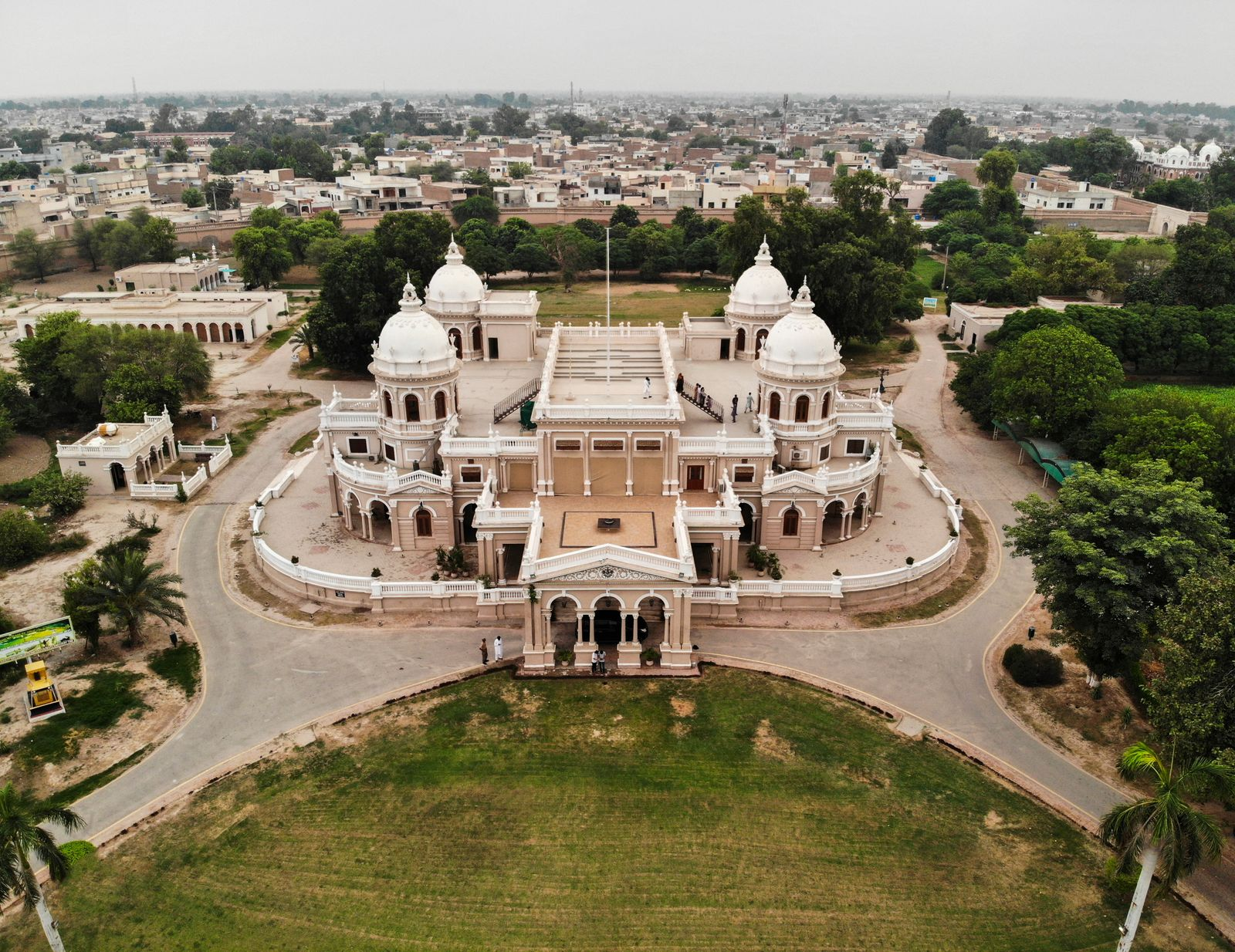
- Gulzar Mahal was built in 1909
- Interactive map of the Gulzar Mahal گلزار محل area

General information
- Architectural style: Indo-Sarcenic
- Location: Bahawalpur, Pakistan
- Coordinates: 29.394700°N 71.697514°E
- Construction started: 1906
- Completed: 1909

Gulzar Mahal is a palace in the city of Bahawalpur, in the Punjab province of Pakistan. The palace has been leased by the armed forces since 1966, and is currently not open to the general public.

== History ==
Gulzar Mahal was built between 1906 and 1909. It was commissioned during the reign of Sadeq Mohammad Khan V, and was built to be the residence for women members of the royal household of the former princely state of Bahawalpur, aside from the Queen. The palace is surrounded by a large garden, and located in the Bahawalgarh Palace Complex in close proximity to the Darbar Mahal, Farrukh Mahal, and Nishat Mahal palaces. This beautiful palace was named after the wife of the Nawab Bahawal Khan V.

The architectural design of this palace blends the European and Indian styles together, with classical touch of pristine white color.

== See also ==
- List of palaces in Pakistan
- Noor Mahal
- Khuda Aur Muhabbat (season 3)
