= Dilkusha Bagh =

Botanic garden in Lahore, Pakistan

Dilkusha Bagh (Punjabi: دلکشا باغ, literally The Engaging Garden or The Charming Garden) is a botanic garden in Lahore, Pakistan. Believed to be founded sometime during the reign of the Mughal Dynasty, it is widely believed to be built by Empress Nur Jahan, and is one of Lahore's top tourist attractions.

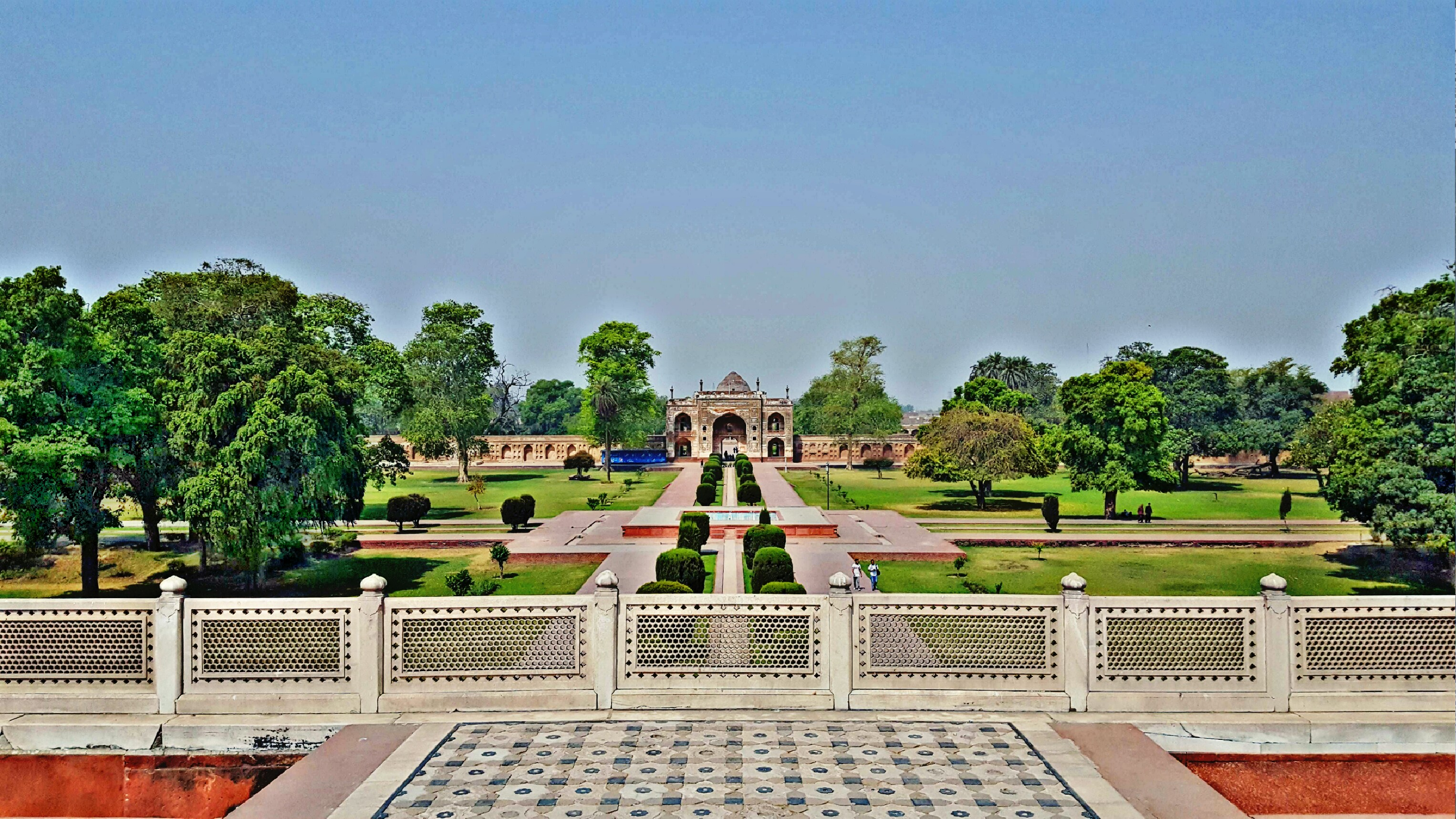
Dilkusha Bagh view from the Roof of the Tomb of Jahangir

The garden's living collections includes hundreds of extremely rare date cultivars, and some 13,000 taxa. Dilkshuka has its own police force and conservatory in effect since 1835. The Agriculture Department of Punjab has a dedicated operations wing for the preservation of Dilkusha Bagh, Shalimar Gardens, and other Mughal-era relics that survived the partition.

== History ==
Very little records exist about this garden. The official district record states:

In the western city of Bhakkar, there is an Indus river flowing, on whose bank lies this old orchard, Dilkusha Bagh, which was constructed right in between the trade route by the Princess Mehr-un-Nissa, the daughter of Mughal Shah Jahangir. During their journey they made a well on that spot, whose water turned out to be extremely sweet. They stayed there for a long period and built an orchard on this spot and built two thrones to sit on them whose remains can still be seen today. During their stay a very precious horse of one of the Mughal sardars died in whose memory a building was built on the horse's grave, remains of which can still be seen on the eastern side of the orchard.

One of the later works from the 18th century gives an idea about the Garden as there were no other major gardens except Dilkusha Bagh, in this region, in the 18th century. The Imperial Gazetteer of India mentions the Garden of Bhakkar as follows:

The neighbouring riverain is full of date groves and fruit gardens; and in it stands a famous mango-tree, the fruit of which used to be sent to Kabul in the old days of Afghan rule.

== See also ==
- Mankera Fort
