= Chitral Gol National Park =

National park in Khyber Pakhtunkhwa, Pakistan

Chitral Gol National Park چترال گول نیشنل پارک
- IUCN category II (national park)
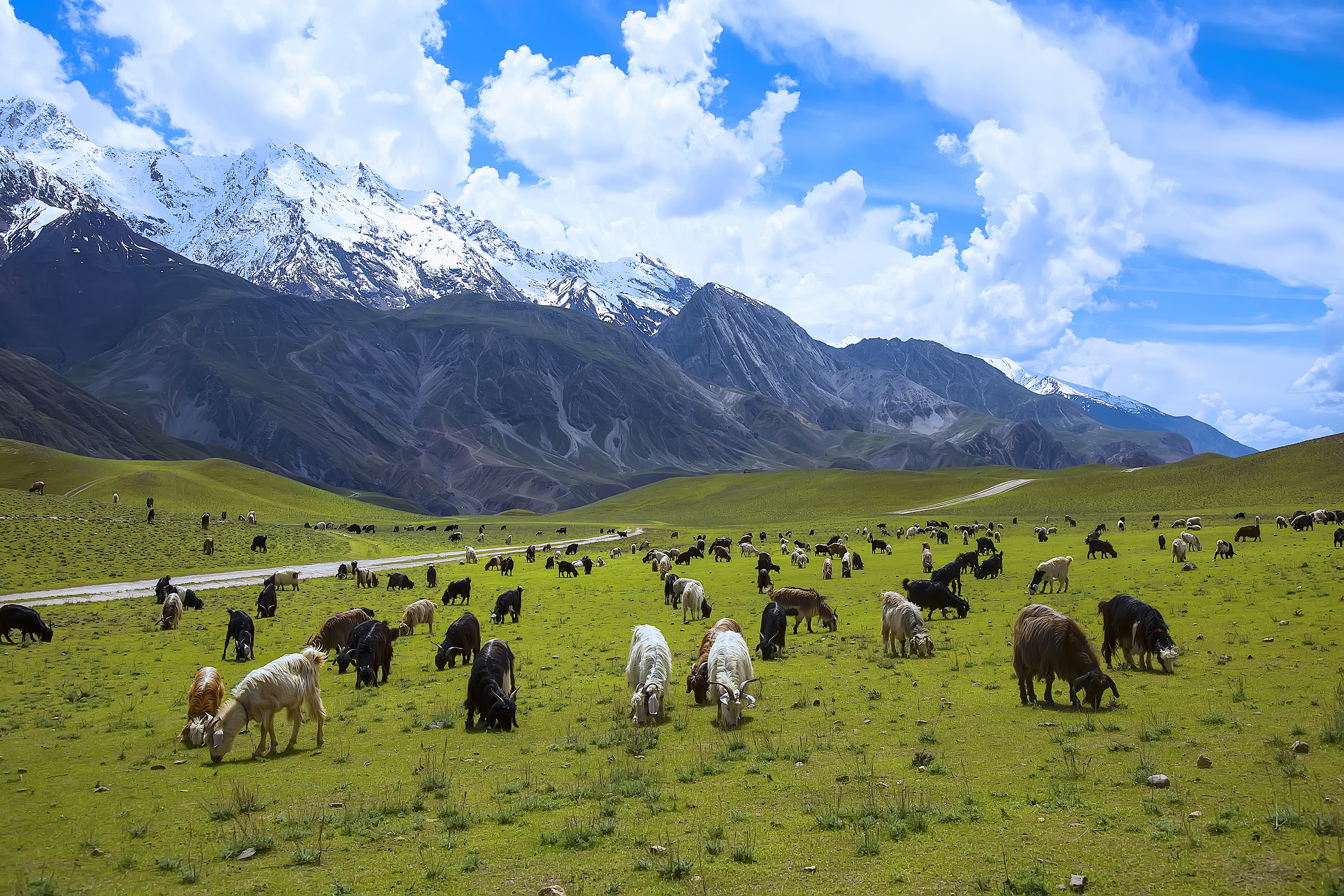
- The park features several alpine meadows

- Location within Pakistan
- Location: Lower Chitral District, Khyber-Pakhtunkhwa
- Coordinates: 35°56′N 71°40′E
- Area: 7,750 ha (19,200 acres)
- Established: 1984
- Governing body: Wildlife and Parks Department of Government of Pakistan

Chitral Gol National Park (Urdu: چترال گول نیشنل پارک) is one of the national parks of Pakistan. It is located in Lower Chitral District in Khyber-Pakhtunkhwa province of Pakistan beside the Chitral River, at a distance of two hours drive from Chitral town. The park is also known as Chitral National Park.

== Geography ==
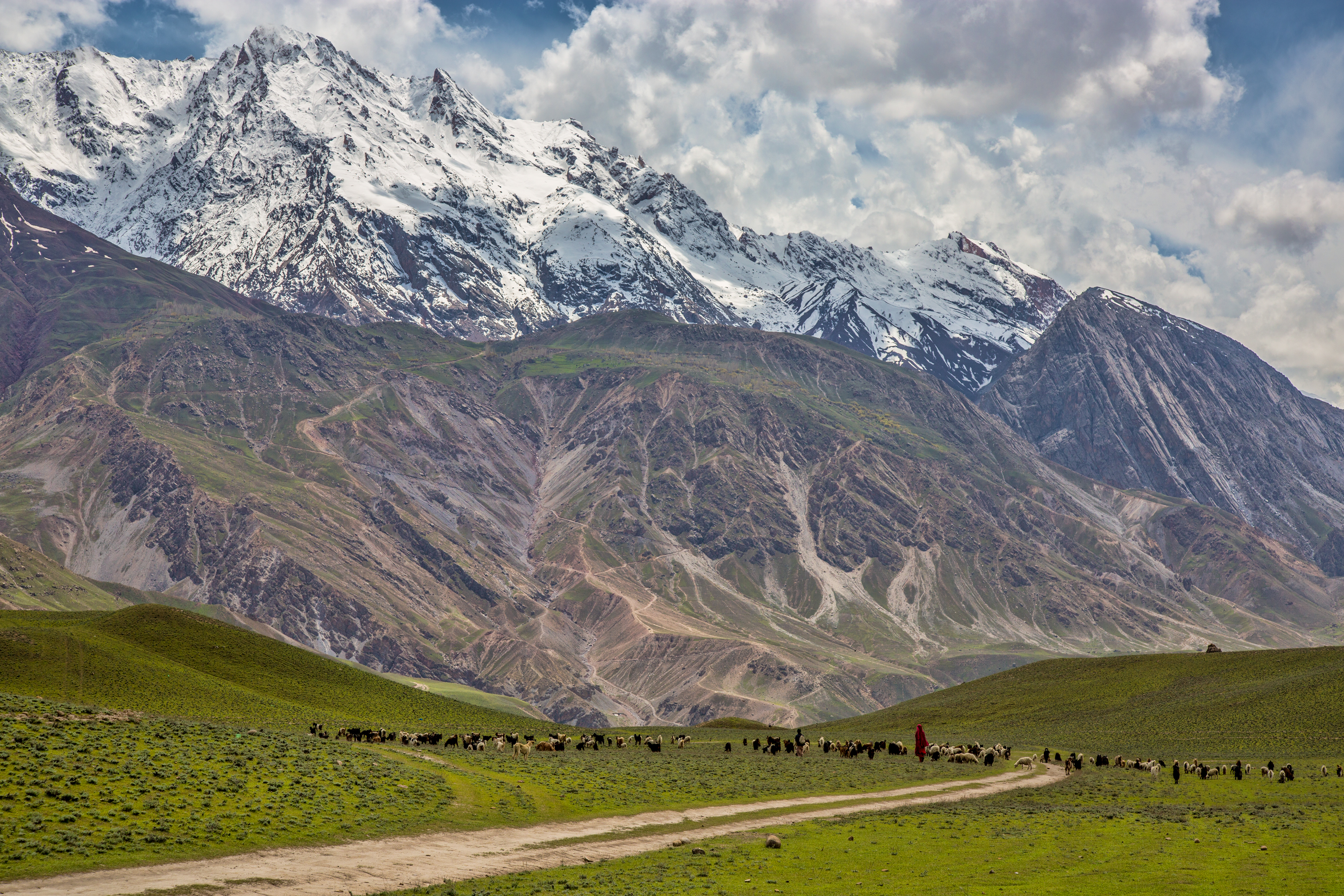
Chitral Gol National Park

The way leading to the park is quite narrow and dangerous, yet more risky during the rainy days. It is located between 1450 metre and about 5000 metre above sea level. It has an area of 7750 hectares.

== Fauna ==
This park includes three valleys. Several glaciers also lie in the park through which several springs make their way and ultimately form a stream which runs 18 kilometres. The cold water of this stream flows towards the east, into the River Chitral. The park is rich in trees particularly cedar trees. The park also serves to provide shelter to a vast bio-diversity, especially markhor, an endangered wild goat species. Some of the larger mammals found in the park include Kashmir markhor, Siberian ibex, snow leopard, Ladakh urial, Himalayan black bear, Himalayan wolf, Red fox, Eurasian otter and Yellow-throated marten.

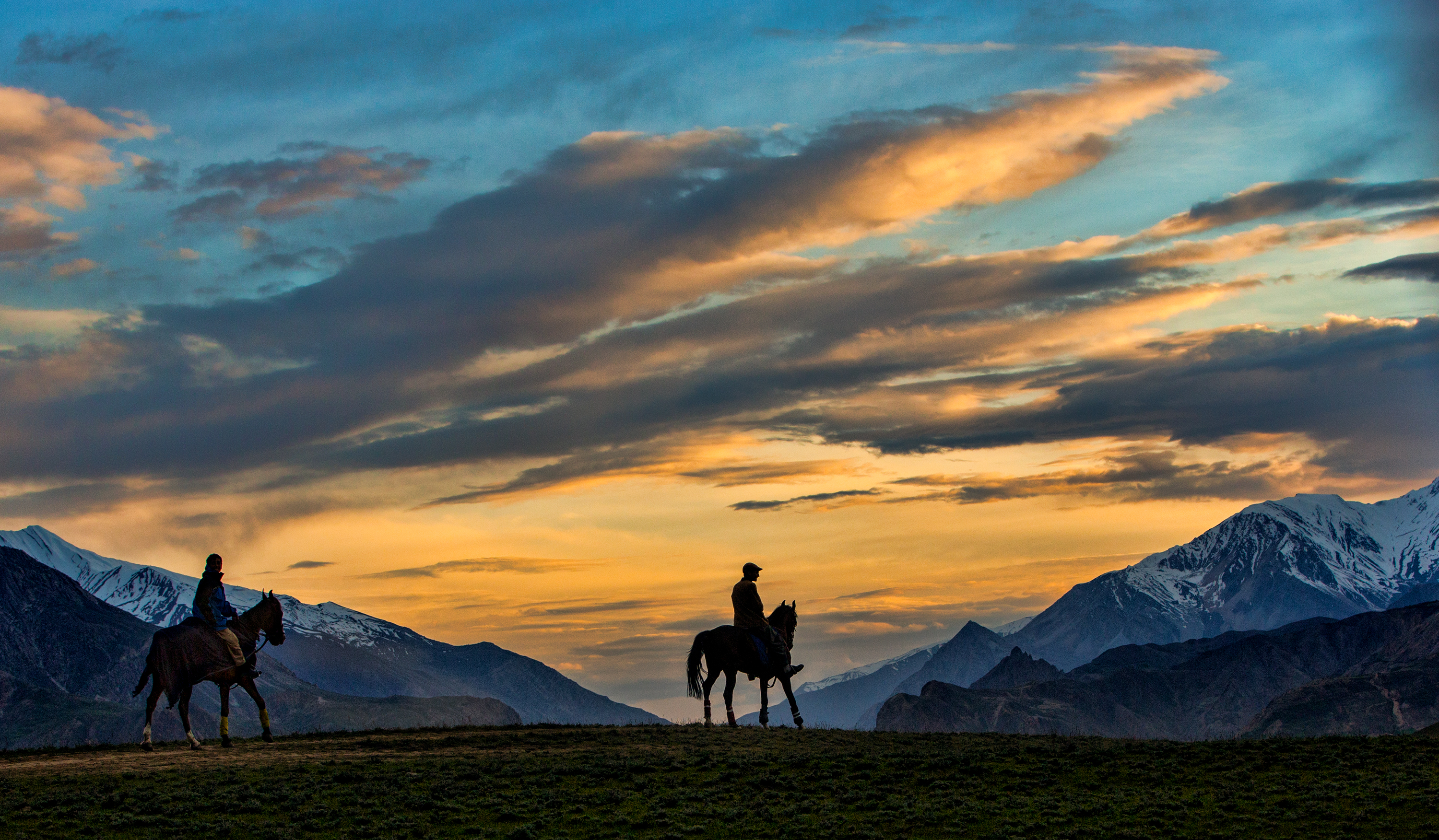
Horse riders at Chitral Gol National Park

Chitral Gol National Park is home to largest population of markhors in the world, with an estimated number of 2,278 in 2021. Due to abundant availability of prey in and around the park, snow leopards have also been increasingly seen in the park.

== Weather ==
The annual rainfall in its region is estimated to be 462 ml (16.3 imp fl oz; 15.6 US fl oz). In September, it rains more on the spectacular peaks surrounding the park. However, in November, the rainfall is more in the valleys and on the lower peaks. There is also snowfall during the winter season. The snow-covered white peaks enhance the beauty till June. The general weather is cold and dry. The temperature ranges from −12.2 to 43.3 °C (10.0 to 109.9 °F).

== Birmoghlasht ==
The Birmoghlasht part of the park is where the former Mehtar's Summer Fort is located. At the time of existence of the Chitral kingdom, the Mehtar and his family use to move here in the summer and hold court. The fort was constructed in such a way that it overlooked the entire city. It stands at an elevation of over 2800 meters above sea level. Besides the fort Birmoghlasht also houses a wildlife hut and is a great tourist spot in a few kilometres drive from Chitral town.

== Legal status ==
Until 1983, Chitral Gol was considered to a private property of the former Mehtar of Chitral. The status of the park has been since in dispute and is in the issue of ongoing litigation between heirs of the former Mehtar and the Government of Pakistan.
