= Sandeman Fort =

Fort in Zhob, Balochistan

- Zhob, Balochistan, Pakistan

Location
- Coordinates: 31°20′55″N 69°27′18″E

Site history
- Built: 1890
- In use: Museum

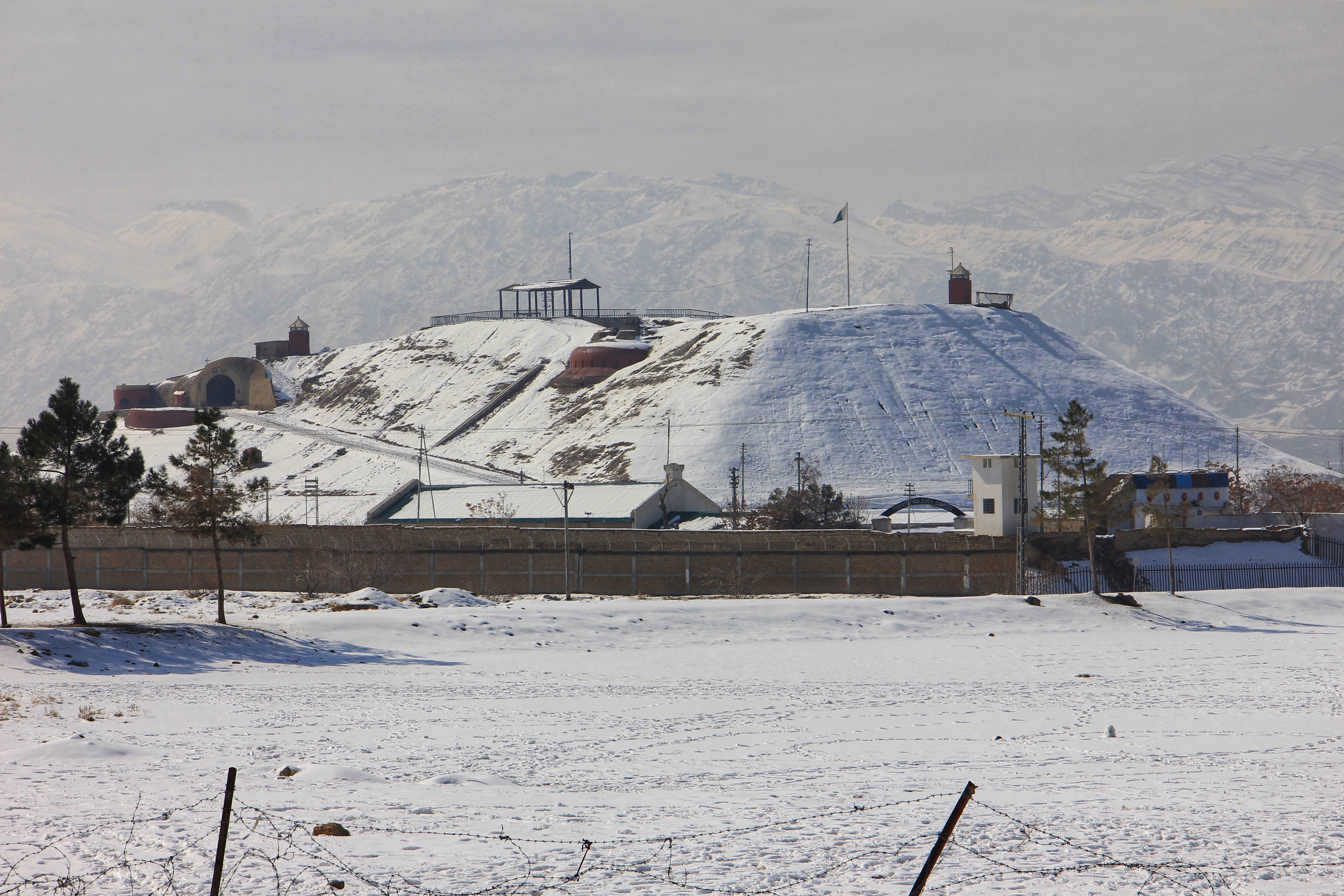

Sandeman Fort is a fortress and cantonment at Zhob, Balochistan, Pakistan.

== History ==
The fort was built in 1890 on the orders of Robert Groves Sandeman, who led the British military campaign in the region. Built of limestone on high ground above the town, it has been compared in appearance to a ship, and was intended both for defence and, reportedly, to watch the local inhabitants. Accommodations for the garrison and officers were also built; Sandeman, who served as Governor General, and his successors as the local political agent lived in a residence at one end of the fort that is locally called the "castle".

After independence, the fort became the residence and office of the Assistant Commissioner of the district. On a visit to the military facilities in 1976, President Zulfiqar Ali Bhutto renamed the city, which had also been called Fort Sandeman, to Zhob.

The fort was declared a historical heritage site by the State of Balochistan, which in 2019 announced an agreement with the Walled City of Lahore Authority to restore it and associated buildings, with the Assistant Commissioner relocating in order for the fort to be opened to the public as a museum. It has retained furniture from the colonial era, including Sandeman's piano. During restoration, concerns were raised that the original fabric was being demolished and replaced because the work was not overseen by archaeologists. During British rule, a local man named Sher Jan Jogezai or Sher Jan Kakar shot the local agent, Major Barnes; a statue of him pointing his gun now stands outside the residence.

== See also ==
- List of forts in Pakistan
