= Khaplu Palace =

Fort and palace in Gilgit-Baltistan, Pakistan

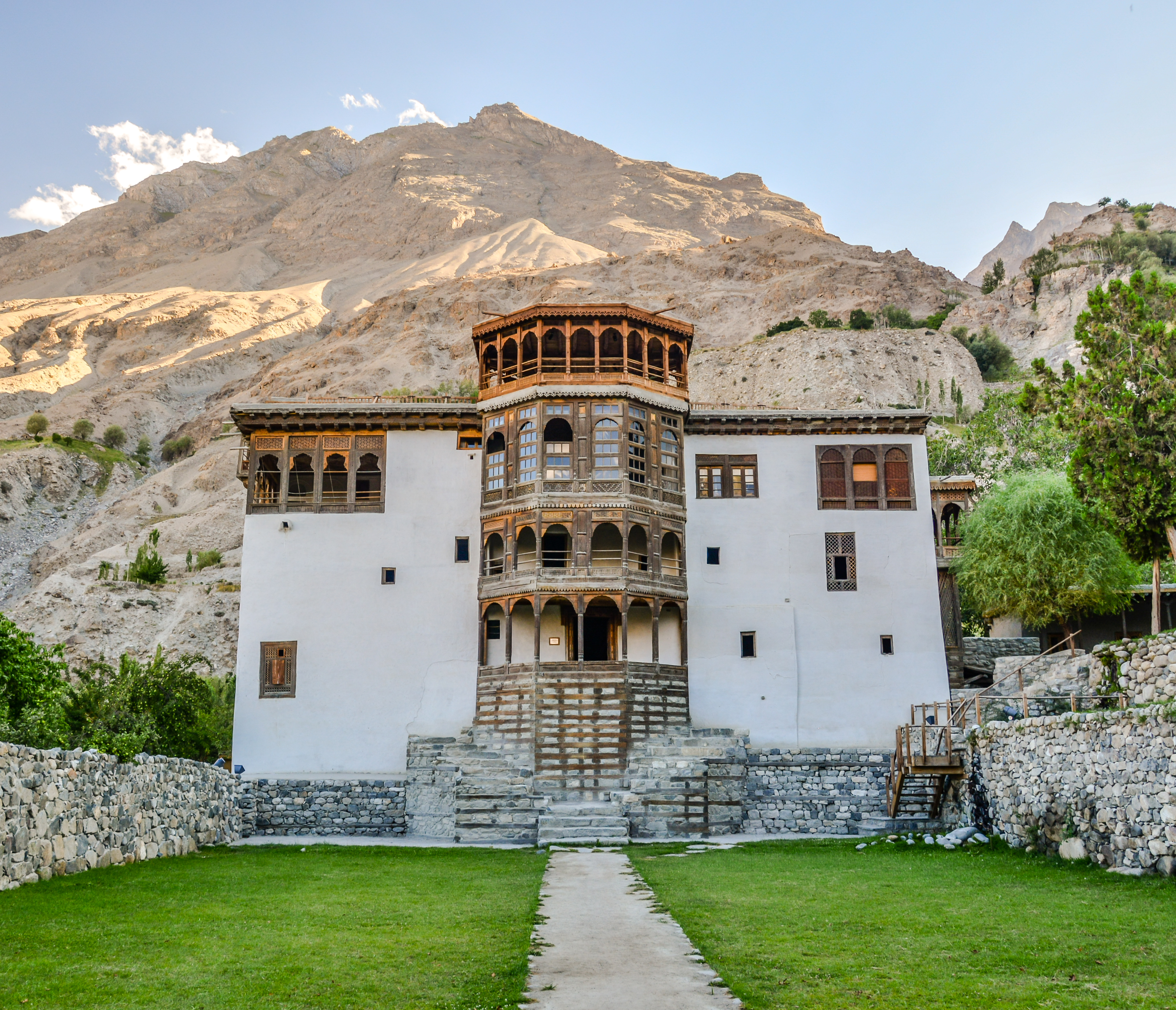
- View of the northern side and main entrance of the palace
- Interactive map of the Khaplu Palace area
- Alternative names: Yabgo Khar

General information
- Type: Palace, museum, hotel
- Architectural style: Balti, Tibetan, Ladakhi
- Location: Khaplu-16800, Ghanche District, Gilgit-Baltistan, Pakistan
- Coordinates: 35°9′6″N 76°20′7″E
- Elevation: 2,600 metres (8,500 ft)
- Completed: 1840
- Renovated: 2011
- Owner: Serena Hotels (2005–present)

Technical details
- Floor count: 5

Design and construction
- Awards: Virgin Holidays Responsible Tourism Award (2012); UNESCO Asia Pacific Heritage Awards (2013)

Renovating team
- Renovating firm: Aga Khan Trust for Culture

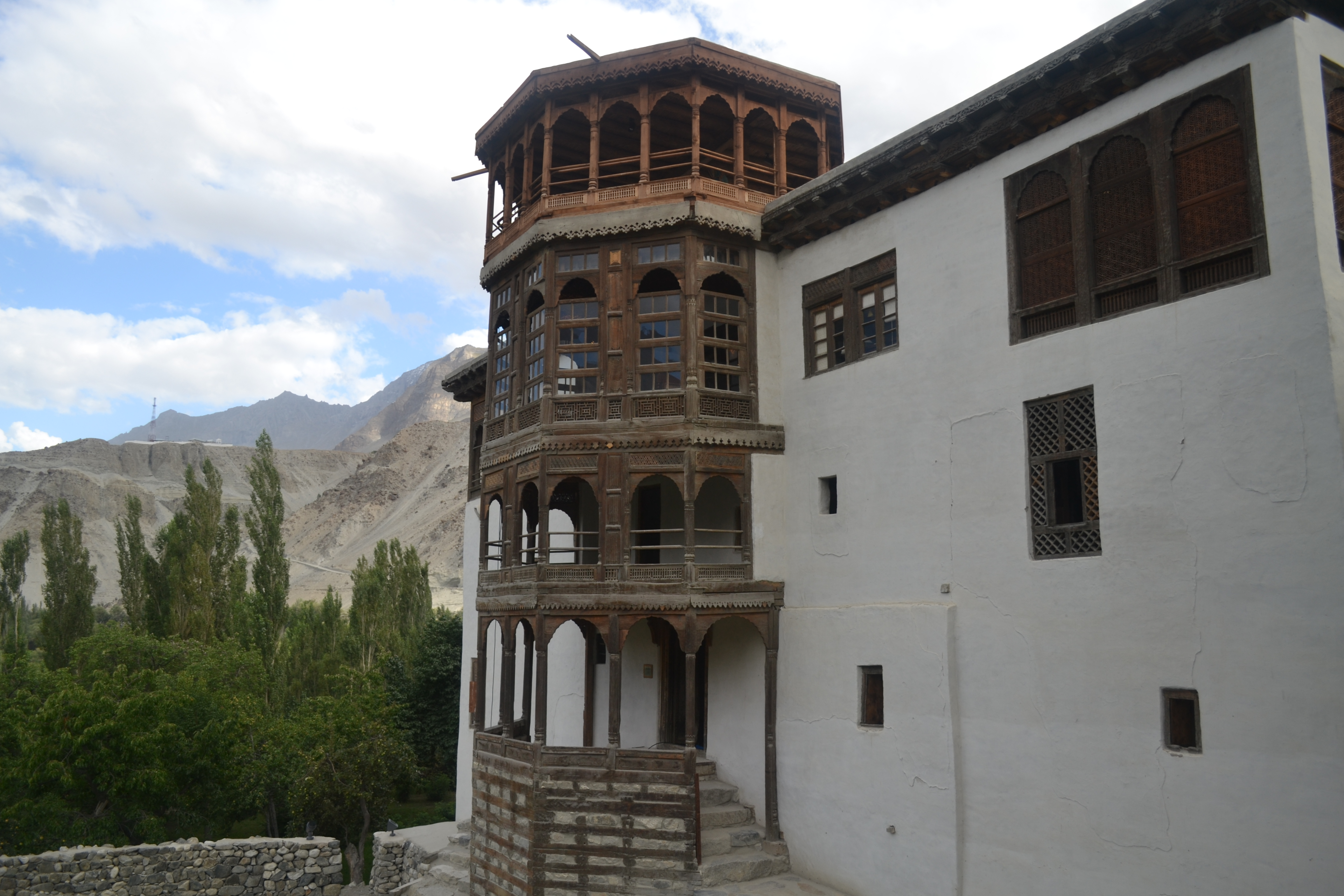
Khaplu Fort, Khaplu

Khaplu Palace, locally known as Yabgo Khar, is an old fort and palace located in Khaplu, a city in Gilgit-Baltistan, Pakistan. The palace, considered an architectural heritage site and a significant tourist attraction, was built in the mid-19th century to replace an earlier-dated fort located nearby. It served as a royal residence for the Raja of Khaplu.

From 2005 to 2011, Khaplu Palace underwent restoration in a project carried out by the Aga Khan Trust for Culture under the Aga Khan Historic Cities Programme. The palace now houses a hotel operated by Serena Hotels and a museum depicting the history and culture of Baltistan.

== Location ==
The town of Khaplu is located in the eastern part of Baltistan, at an altitude of 2,600 metres (8,500 ft) above sea level and is the administrative capital of the Ghanche District. River Shyok, a tributary of River Indus, passes through the town, along which is the ancient trade route to Ladakh. Khaplu Palace is located north of the Khaplu town and south of the Shyok river in front of the high mountains of Karakoram range. A trek behind the palace in a ravine leads to the village of Pari in Skardu District.

== History ==
Khaplu Palace was built in 1840 by the Yabgo Raja Daulat Ali Khan of Khaplu after the Dogra of Jammu who captured the region decided to move the seat of government from the old fort. The site of the palace was chosen by rolling a large stone down from a nearby cliff; it stopped at the Doqsai village, and the palace was built there. The earlier fort was located near the location of the present-day palace. Khaplu Palace replaced the former fort as the royal residence after its completion. According to Jane E. Duncan, the people of Khaplu used to live inside this fort and were not allowed to build their homes outside its premises. After the Maharaja of Kashmir assumed control of the region, this custom was changed, which led to an end to hostilities between the local kings.

The former fort was captured by Murad Khan of Maqpon Dynasty, the ruler of Baltistan, in the Conquest of Khaplu in the 1590s by cutting off the water and other supplies to the fort. The troops of Murad besieged the fort for three months, resulting in the surrender of Rahim Khan, the 62nd Yabgo dynasty ruler of Khaplu. The fort again fell to invaders in the 1660s and 1674.

The Yabgo descendants continued to live there even after their kingdom was abolished in 1972. The last Raja of Khaplu who lived in the house was Raja Fatah Ali Khan, who died in 1983. His son Raja Zakria died in 2020.

== Architecture ==
The palace was constructed with the help of Kashmiri and Balti craftsmen. Being on the border of multiple regions, the structure of the palace has Tibetan, Kashmiri, Ladakhi, Balti, and Central Asian influences.

The palace building consists of four floors built with timber, mud bricks, clay, and soil mortar. A carved wooden gate that Yabgo Raja Hatim Khan took from a fort in Skardu after conquering most of the Baltistan was erected at the entrance of the palace. The passage beyond the main gate, which formerly housed a stable, leads to the front lawn of the palace, which was used by the musical band during festivities in the reign of Yabgo Rajas. The wooden ceiling of the palace is crafted with designs using chisel and paint, without the use of nail. A hall at the top floor that was used as a leisure room overlooks the Karakoram mountain range and the lawns around the palace. Other notable rooms of the palace include the Royal meeting room (Chogoraftal), Royal balcony (Chogojarokh), Princess dressing room (Lainakhang), and Queen room.

Following the renovation of the palace, a section of residential area is being used as a hotel, operated by Serena Hotels and employing people from 35 local households. The hotel has 21 rooms, six of which are located inside the palace building and utilise its 70 percent of income for the development of the Khaplu region, while another area serves as a museum.

== Renovation ==
Khaplu Palace is the second fort in Baltistan to be renovated by the Aga Khan Trust for Culture. Renovation started in 2005 and was completed in 2011. The project was funded by the Norwegian Ministry of Foreign Affairs via its embassy in Islamabad. USAID helped fund an exhibition centre for Balti culture inside the fort. The exhibition centre takes up two-thirds of the site. The renovation work was carried out with the help of people from 400 local families employed as an initiative towards community building. The survey encompassing the topographical features of the renovation site. begun in 2005, used Electronic Distance Measurement (EDM) devices. The survey helped in finding the original state of a number of decrepit portions of the palace. The renovation project was carried out following the Venice Charter's standards for restoration. The material procured for the restoration amounted to thirty million rupees (Rs 30 m), while the wages of the labourers aggregated to about twenty five million rupees (Rs 25 m).

== Awards ==
The rescue and renovation work of the palace was commended by Virgin Holidays for having social and economic effects on the locals of the area. The palace won the Virgin Holidays Responsible Tourism Award as the best project in the "Poverty Reduction" category in 2012. In 2013 the palace was awarded the Award for Distinction by UNESCO Asia Pacific Heritage Awards, along with Lal Chimney Compound in India and The Great Serai in Afghanistan.

The famous drama serial Dayar-e-Dil was shot at Khaplu fort.

== See also ==
- Altit Fort
- Shigar Fort
- Baltit Fort
- List of forts in Pakistan
- List of museums in Pakistan
