= Noor Mahal =

Historic palace in Bahawalpur, Pakistan

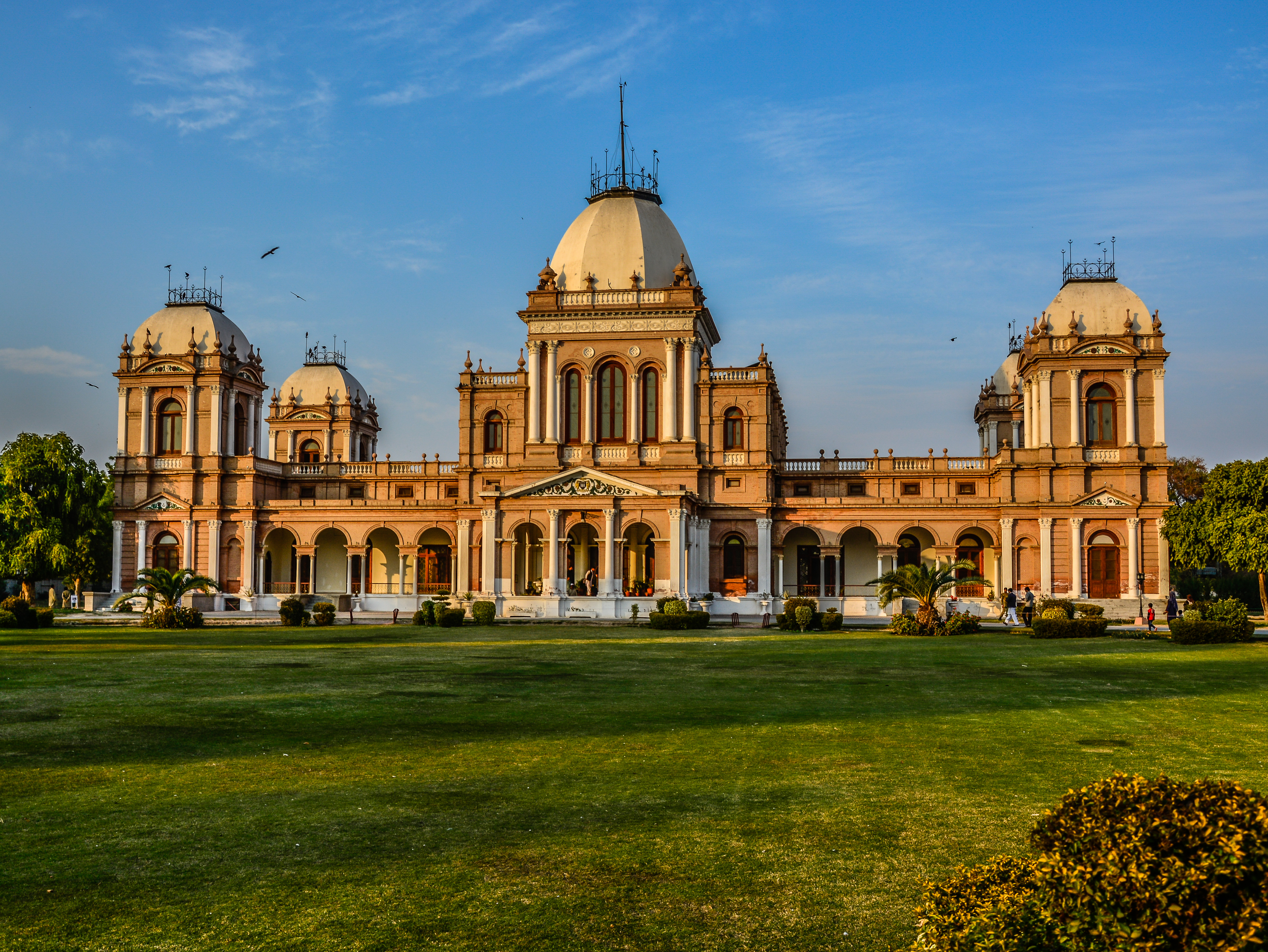
- Front façade of the palace

General information
- Architectural style: Italian chateau on neoclassical lines
- Location: Bahawalpur, Punjab, Pakistan
- Coordinates: 29.3792°N 71.6679°E
- Construction started: 1872
- Completed: 1875

Technical details
- Size: 4,140 square metres (44,600 sq ft)

Design and construction
- Architect: Mr. Heennan

The Noor Mahal (Punjabi/Urdu: نور محل, lit. 'Palace of Light') is a historic royal palace located in Bahawalpur, Punjab, Pakistan. It was constructed in the 1870s by the princely state of Bahawalpur, and served as the residence and workplace of the Nawab. It is currently owned by the Ministry of Defense (MoD) under the management of the Army Secretariat.

It was built in 1872 as an Italian chateau on neoclassical lines, at a time when modernism had set in. It belonged to the Nawabs of Bahawalpur princely state, during the British Raj.

== History ==
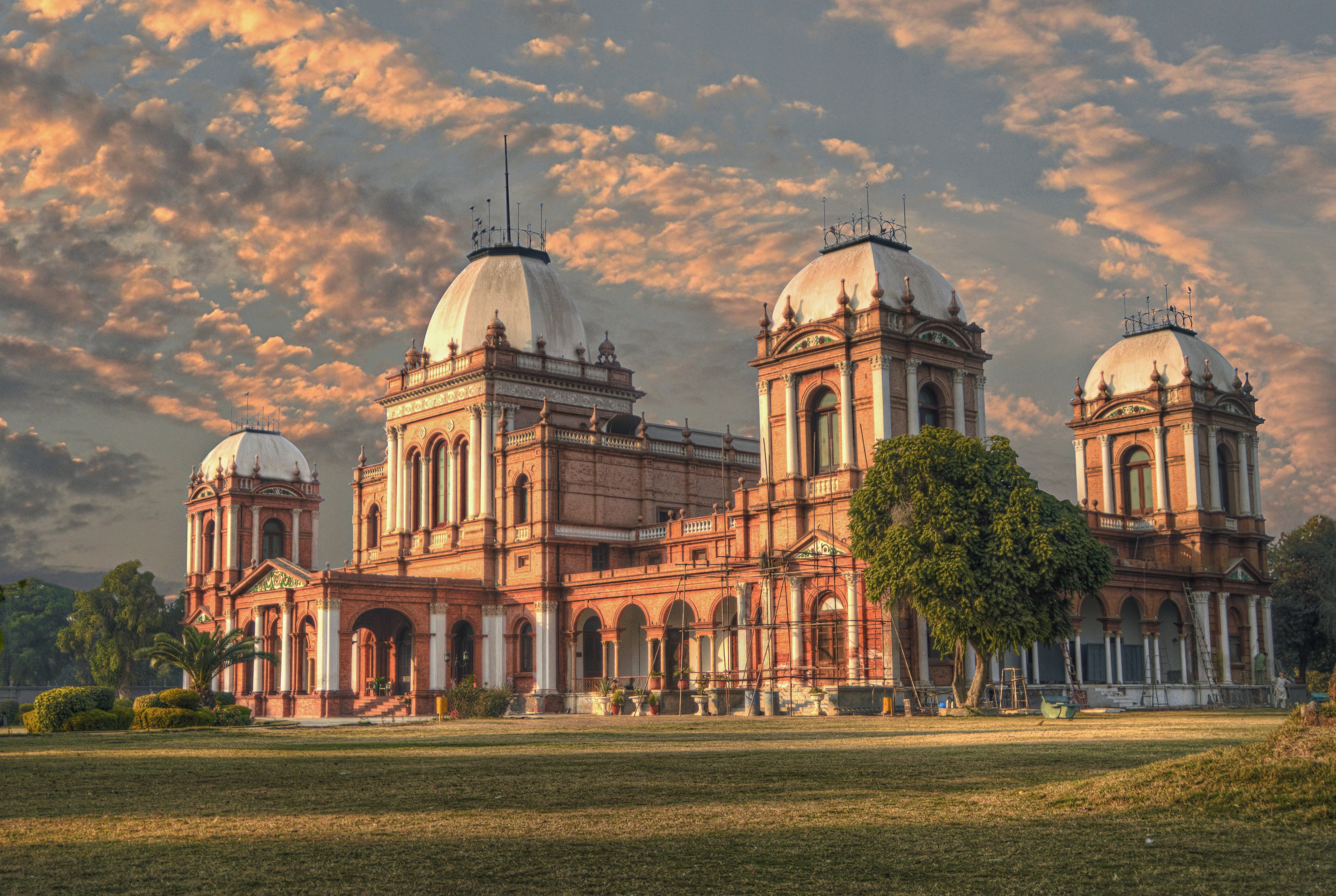
Facade and entrance of Noor Mahal

The building was designed by an Englishman named Mr. Heennan, who was the state engineer. The foundation of Noor Palace was laid in 1872. A map and coins of the state were buried in its foundation as a good omen. Most of the palace's materials and furniture were imported from England and Italy. The construction of the palace was completed in 1875 at a cost of Rs. 1.2 million. The palace was originally constructed to serve as a residence for the Nawabs of the Bahawalpur princely state during the British Raj era. Nawab Sadiq Khan IV, who was known for his love of architecture and often compared to Shahjahan of Bahawalpur, commissioned the palace for his wife, Noor. However, after spending only one night in the palace, Noor decided not to return due to its close proximity to the Basti Malook Shah graveyard, which was visible from her balcony. She instead chose to reside in Darbar Mahal.

On January 11, 1890, Prince Albert Victor visited the palace.

From December 22 to 24, 1892, Sir McOrth Beck, a senior finance commissioner of Punjab, and his family stayed at the palace. The palace also served as the location for the celebration of Queen Victoria's 60th birthday on May 11, 1897.

In 1906, Nawab Muhammad Bahawal Khan the fifth added a mosque to the palace at the cost of Rs. 20,000.

On February 9, 1933, an important event was held at Noor Mahal to celebrate the union between the British Government and the Bahawalpur State. The State of Bahawalpur also celebrated its 10-year jubilee at the palace on March 8, 1934.

In 1956, when Bahawalpur State was merged into Pakistan, the building was taken over by the Auqaf department. The palace was leased to the army in 1971; in 1997 the army purchased it for the sum of 119 million.

== Architecture ==
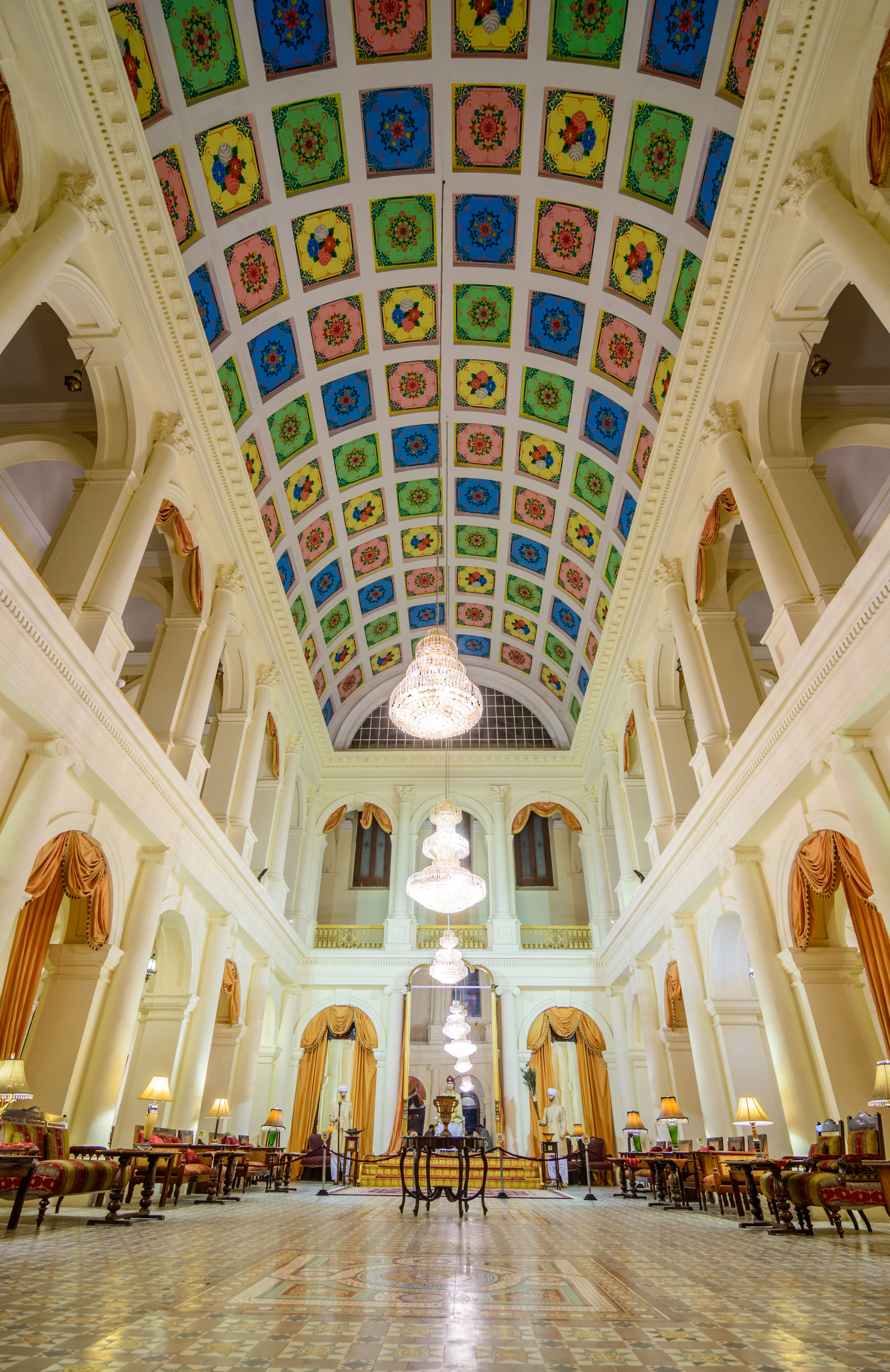
Interior of the Noor Mahal

Noor Palace covers an area of 4,140 square metres (44,600 sq ft). It has 32 rooms including 14 in the basement, 6 verandas and 5 domes.

The design encompasses features of Corinthian and Islamic styles of architecture with a tinge of subcontinental style. The Corinthian touch is visible in the columns, balustrade, pediments and the vaulted ceiling of Durbar Hall. The Islamic style is evident in the five domes, whereas the angular elliptical shapes are a stroke of subcontinent style.

The building was declared a "protected monument" in September 2001 by the Government of Pakistan's Department of Archeology, and it is now open for general visitors, students trips and other interested persons.

== Gallery ==
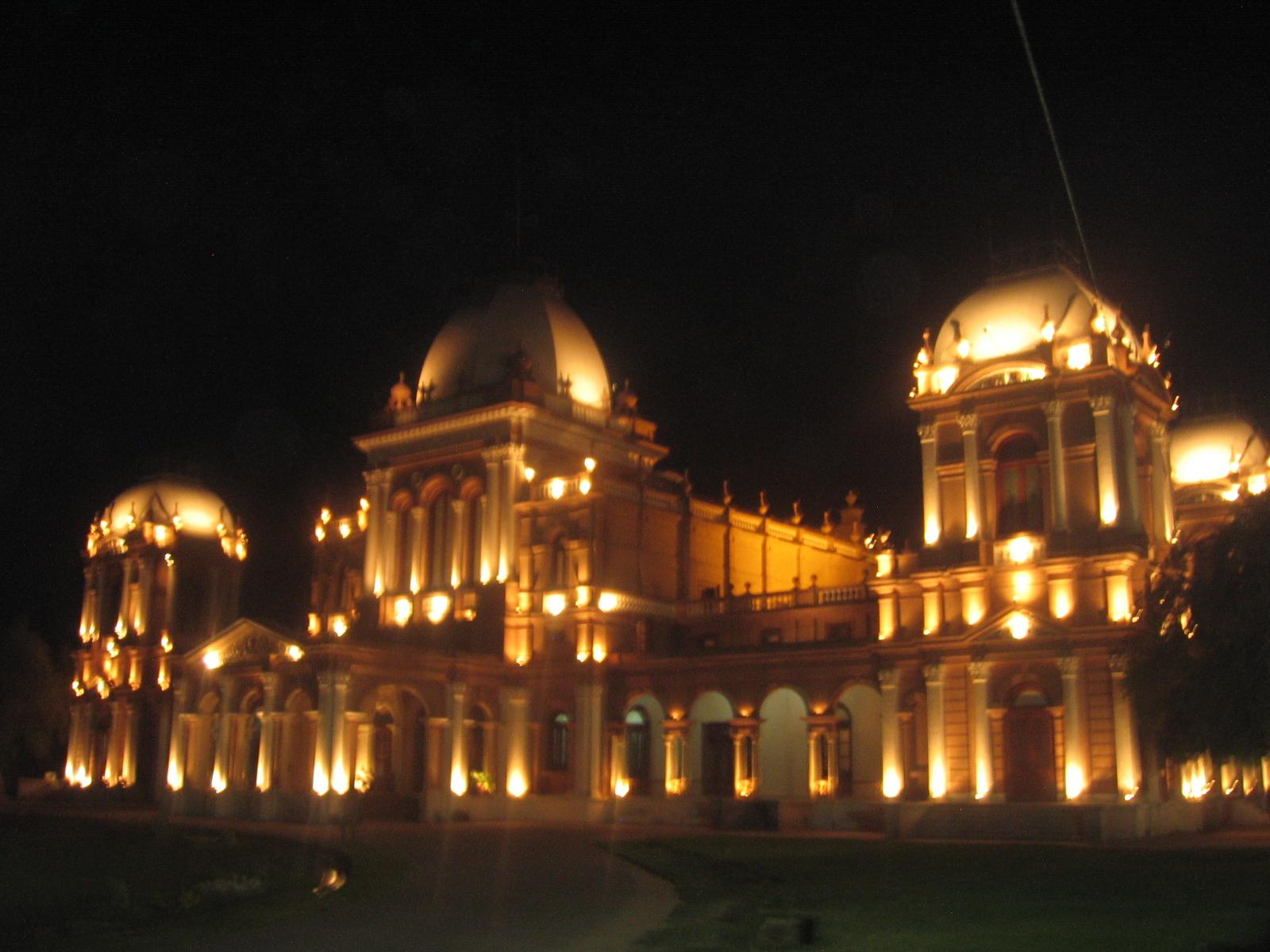
A night view of the Noor Mahal

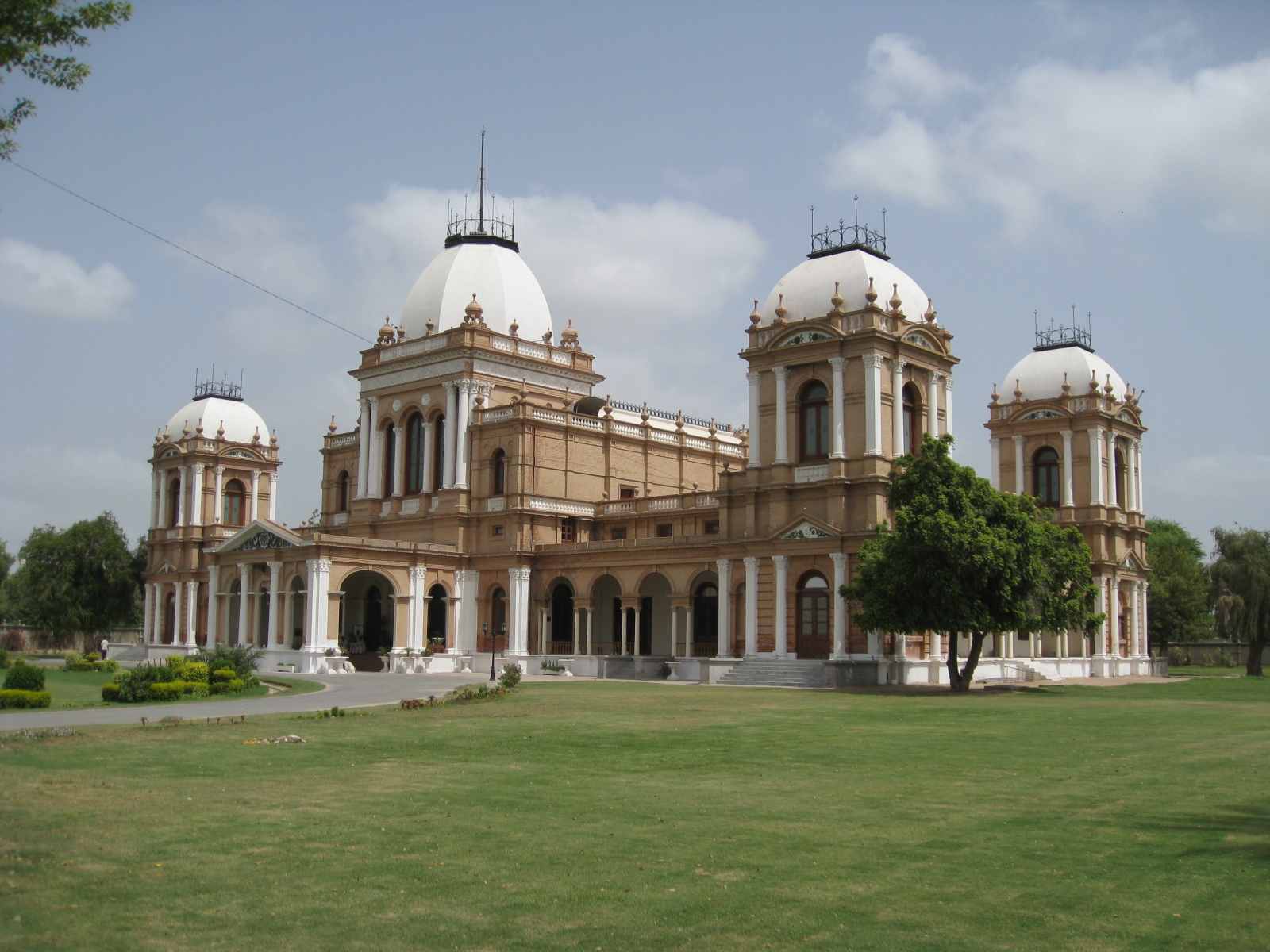
Side view of the Noor Mahal

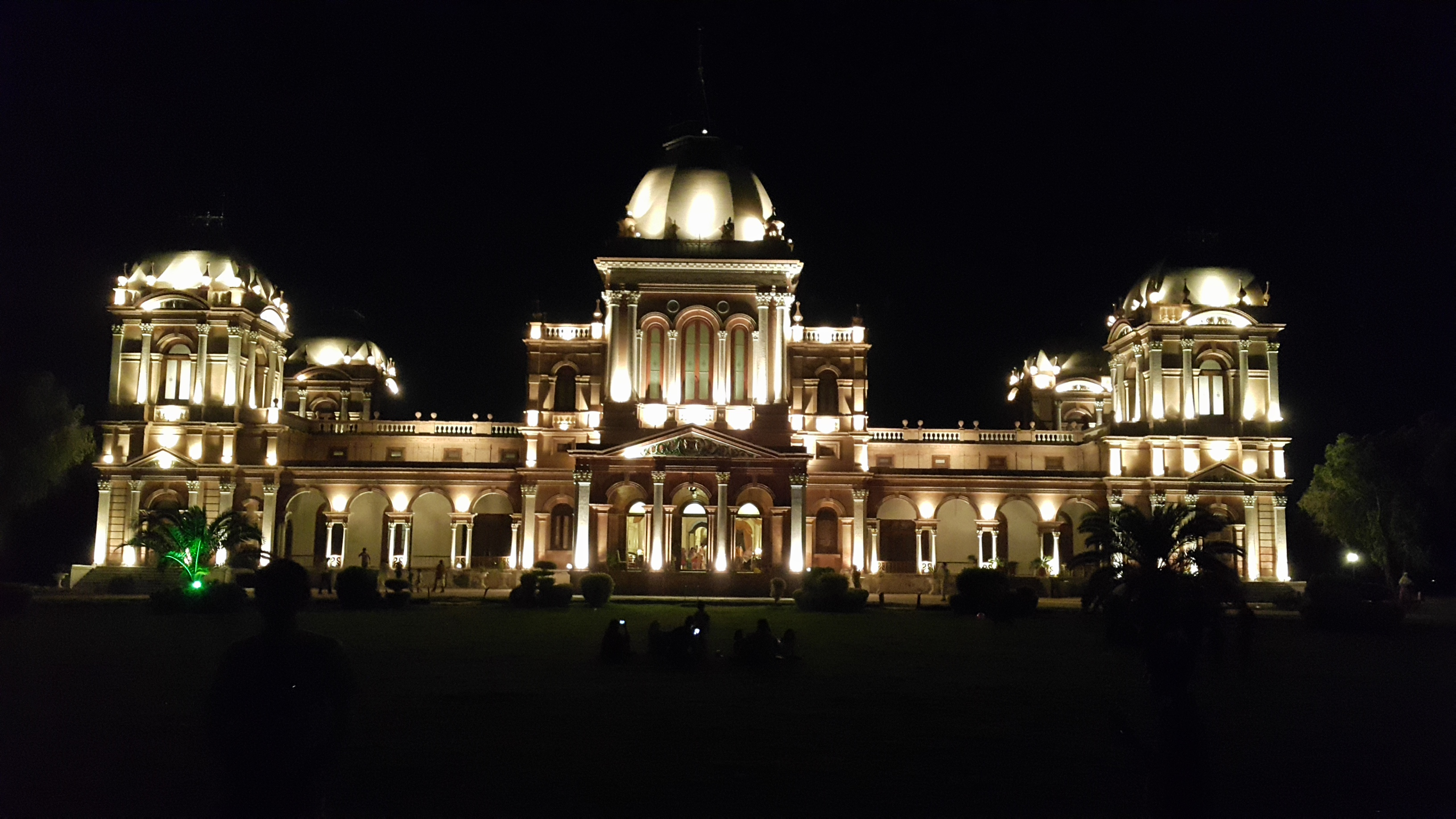

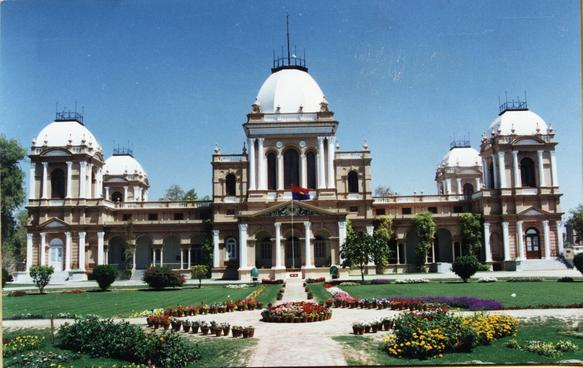
Noor Mahal front view day time

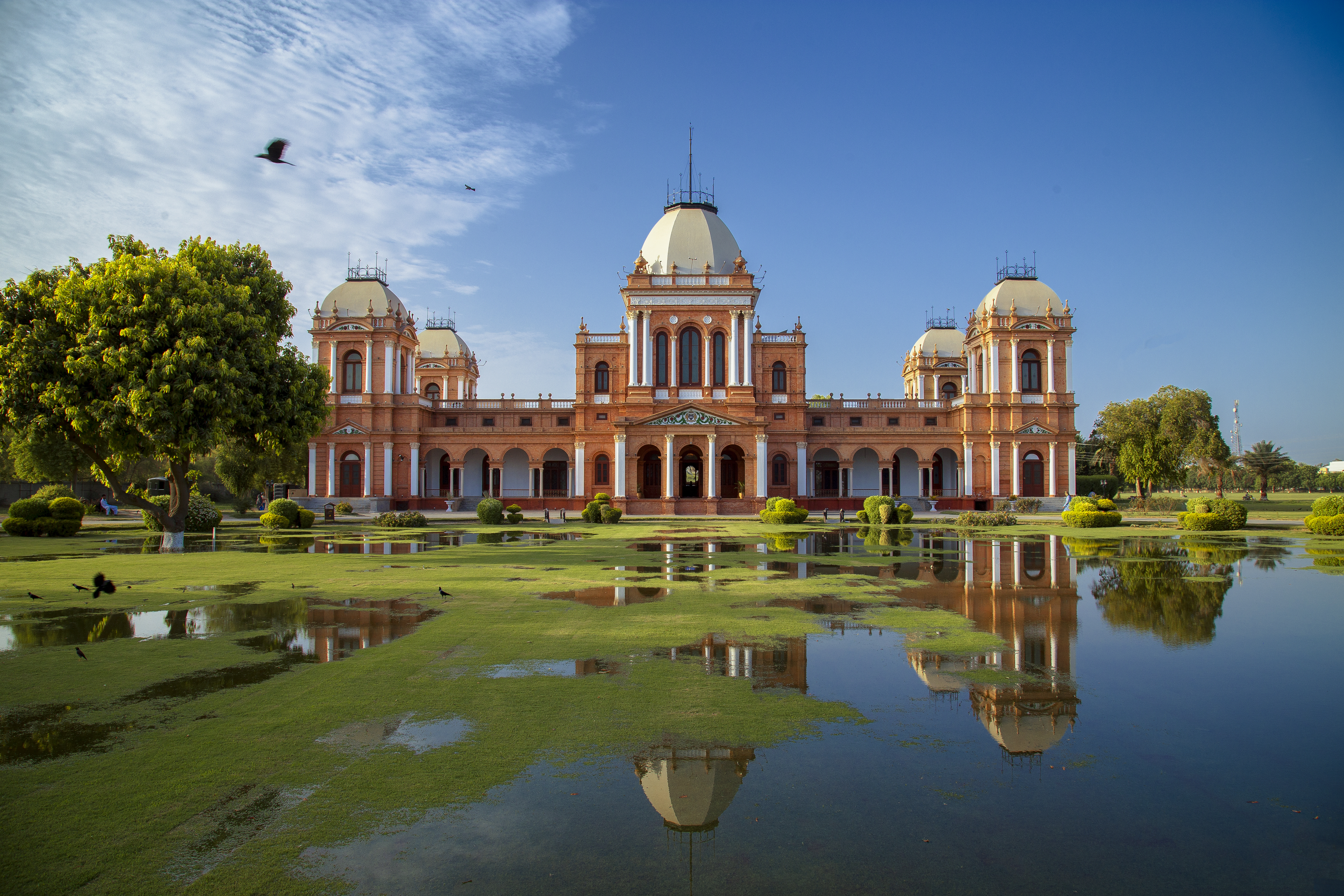
Noor Mahal after rain

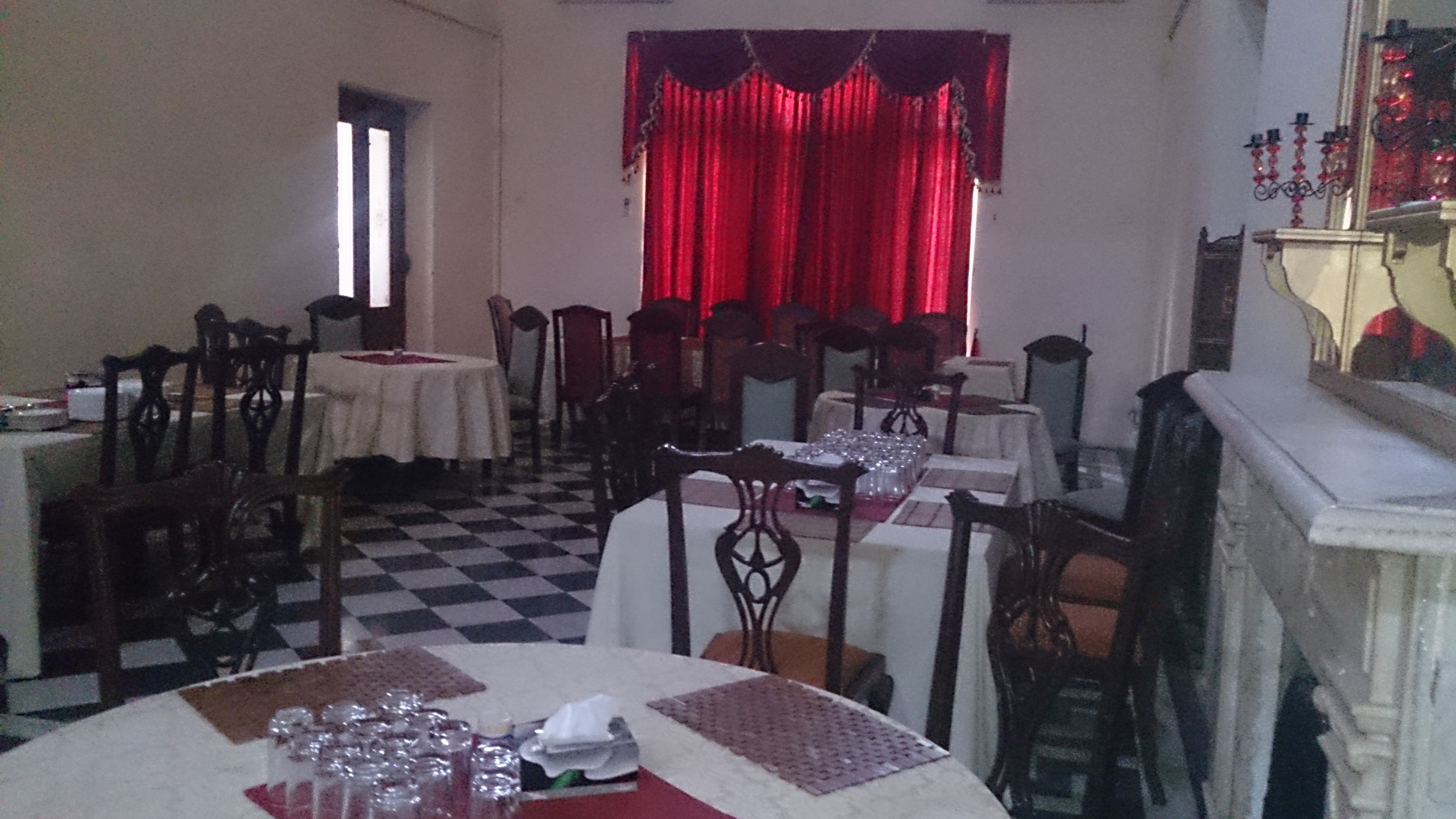
A dining room for visitors at Noor Mahal

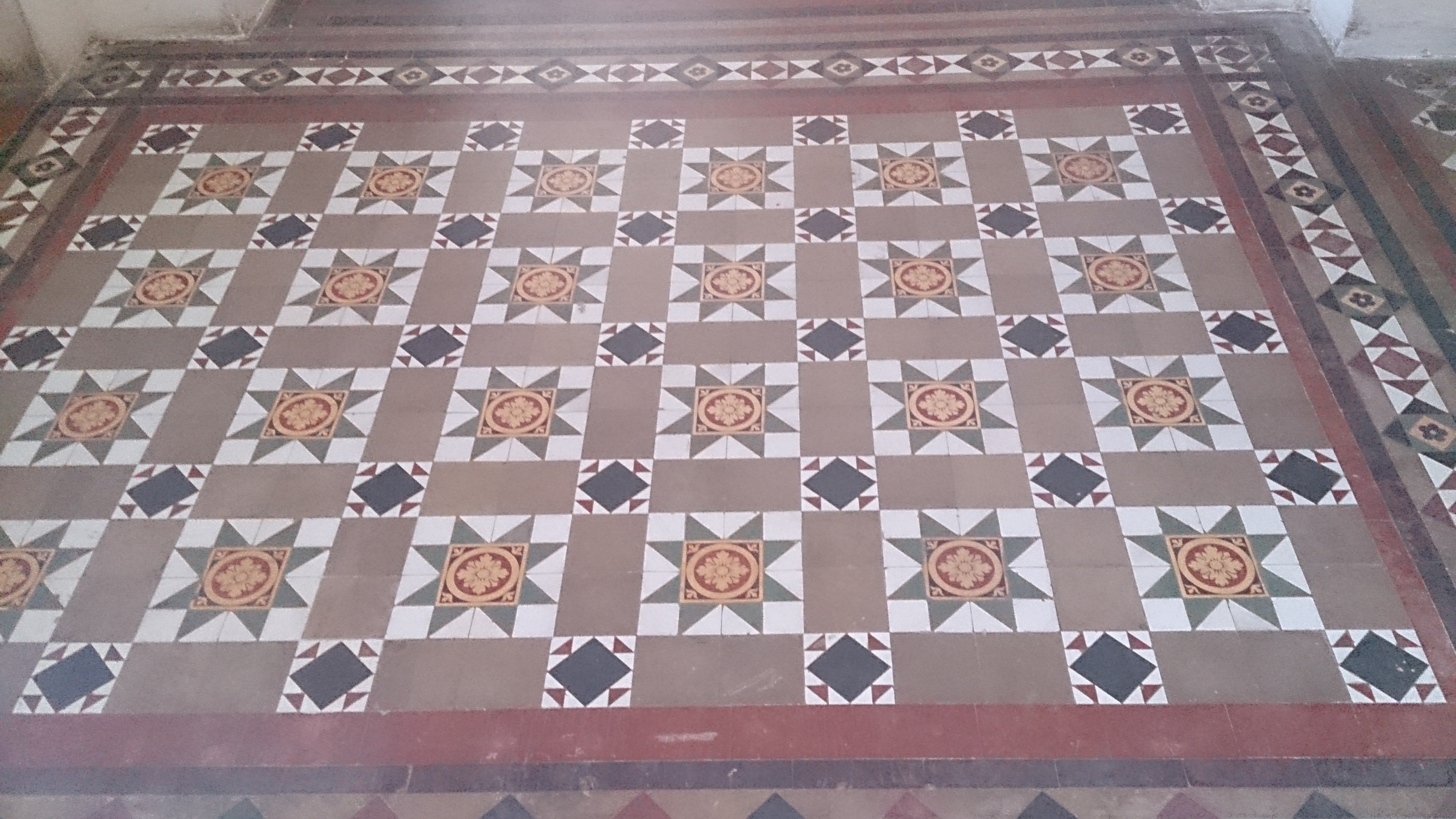
Noor Mahal decorative tile floors

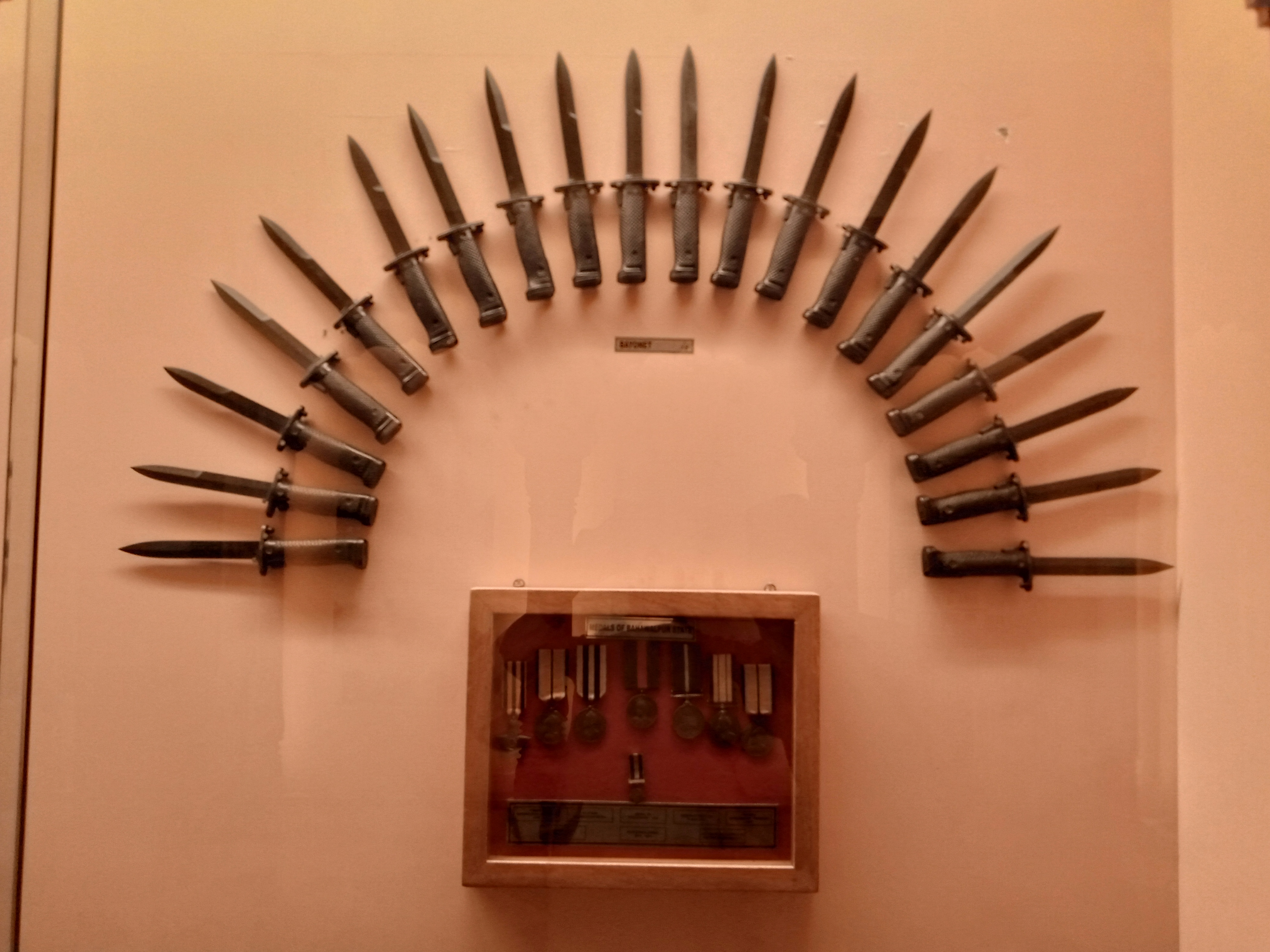
Display of historical knives on a wall of Noor Mahal

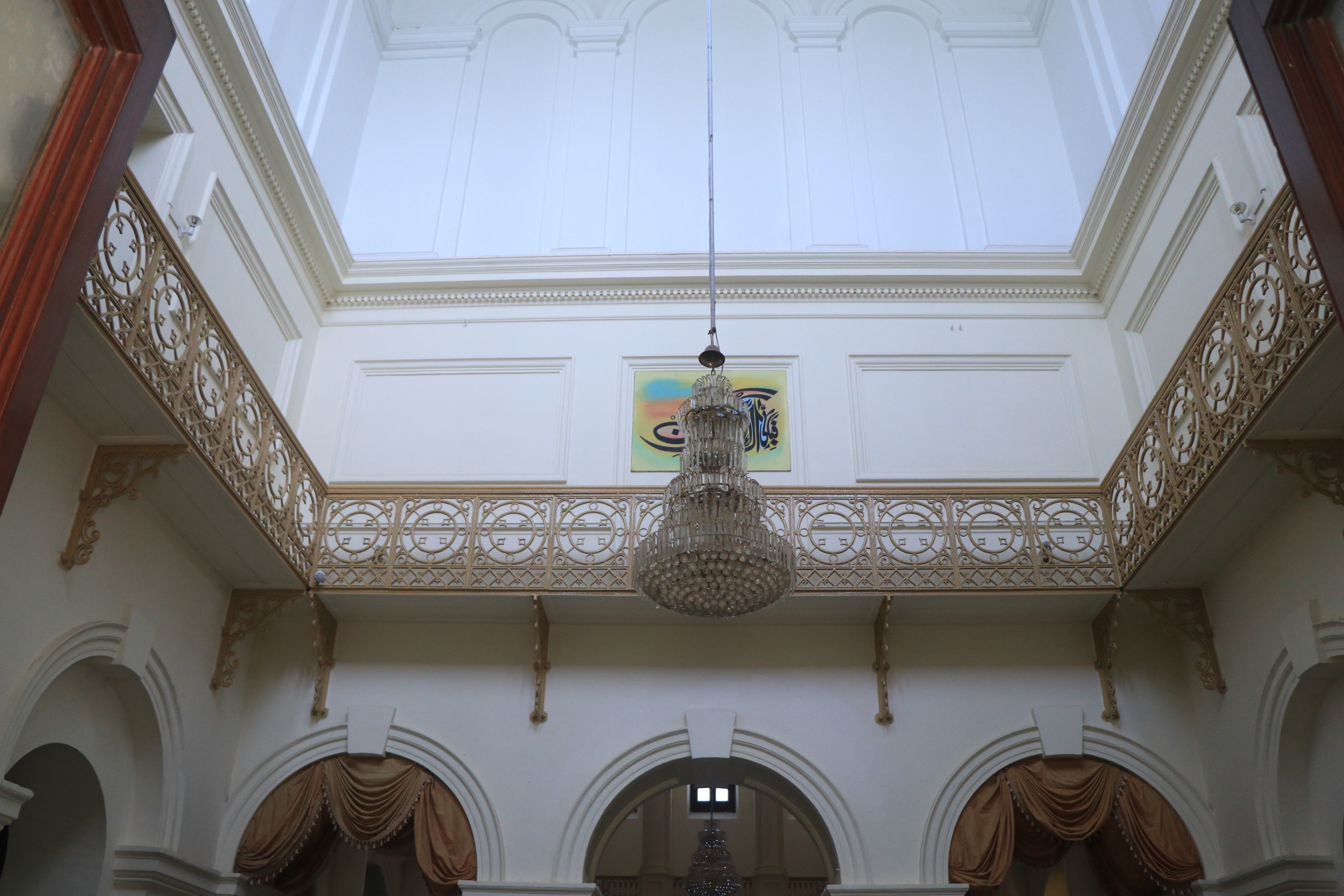
A beautiful balcony at Noor Mahal

== See also ==
- List of UNESCO World Heritage Sites in Pakistan
- List of forts in Pakistan
- List of museums in Pakistan
- Bahawalpur
- Bahawalpur State
