= Shigar Palace =

Fort in Gilgit-Baltistan, Pakistan

Shigar Fort
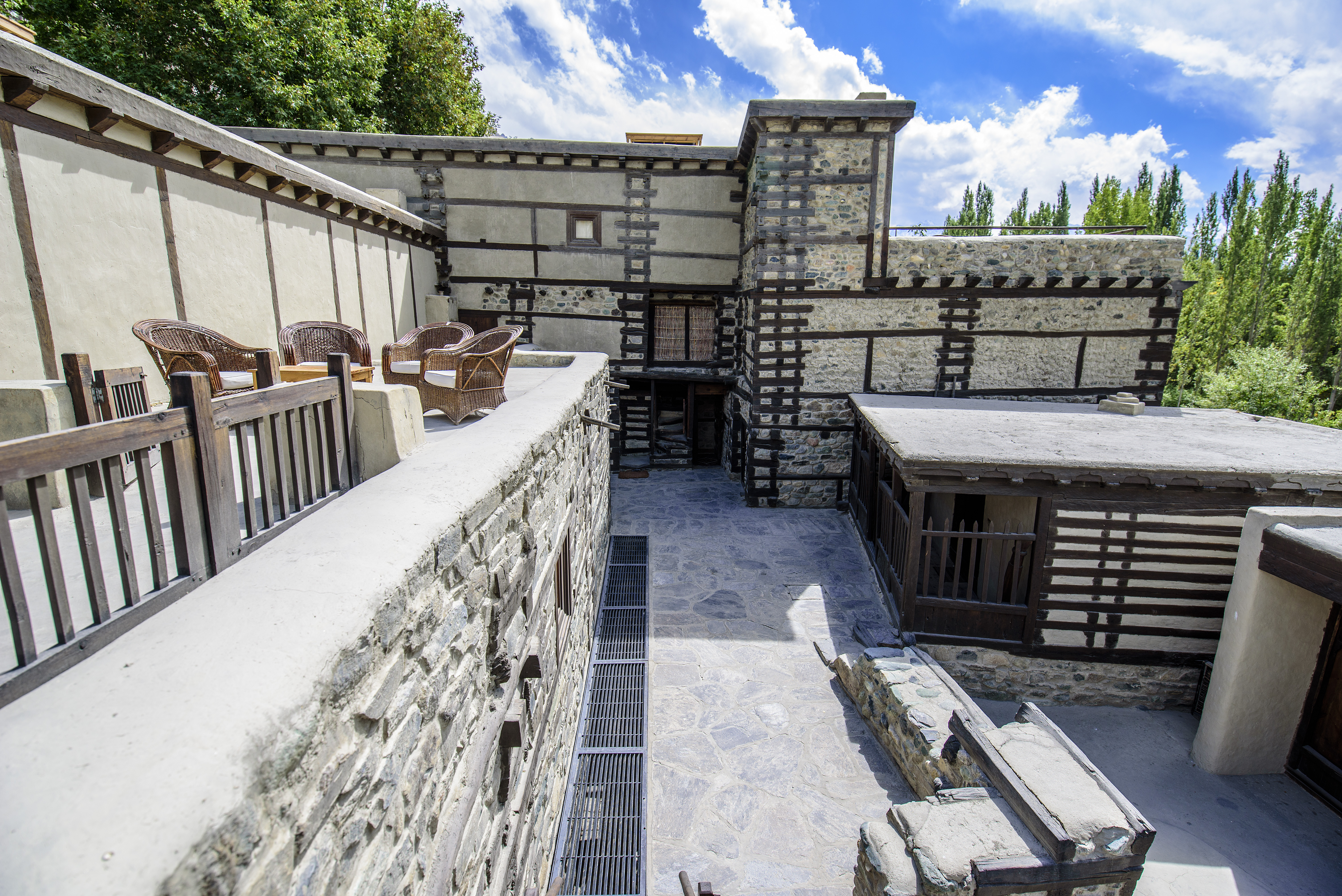
- Shigar fort in Shigar near Skardu
- Interactive map of Shigar Fort
- 35°25′23″N 75°44′32″E
- Location: Shigar, Gilgit-Baltistan

History
- Built: 17th century

The Shigar Palace, also known as Fong Khar, (Balti and Urdu: فونگ کھر; lit. 'The Palace on the Rock') is an old palace located in the town of Shigar, Gilgit-Baltistan, Pakistan. Situated at a distance of around 30 kilometres (19 mi) from Skardu, it lies on the way which further leads to Baltoro Glacier and K2, the latter being the second highest mountain on the Earth.

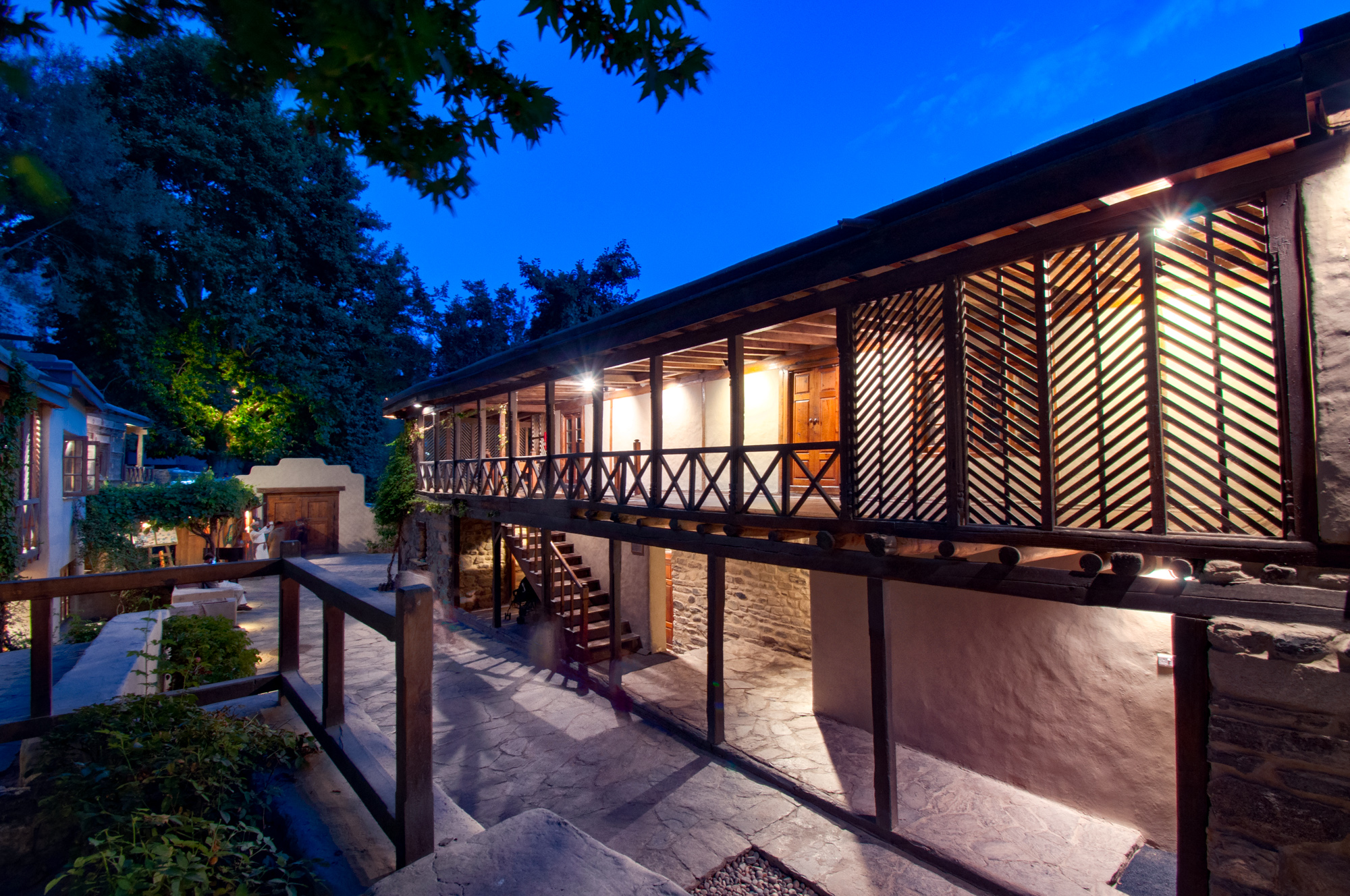
Shigar Fort at night

== History ==
Escaping persecution in Ganish, a settlement in Hunza, a fort named Khar-i-Dong was built in Shigar by the Amachas in the 11th century. Later, the fort was destructed by an invasion of the Mughals in the region. However, the current structure was originally built in the 17th century by the 20th Raja of Amacha Dynasty of Shigar who made its construction on a large boulderstone and called it the same as Fong Khar lit. 'Palace on the Rock'. The fort has been restored by Aga Khan Cultural Service Pakistan (AKCSP-P), the Pakistan arm of the Aga Khan Historic Cities Programme. After restoration, the fort was converted to a heritage museum and luxury hotel managed by Serena Hotels. The restoration process took place from 1999 to 2004 and cost approximately US$1.4 million. Later in 2006, the fort won the UNESCO Asia Pacific Heritage Award for its cultural heritage conservation.

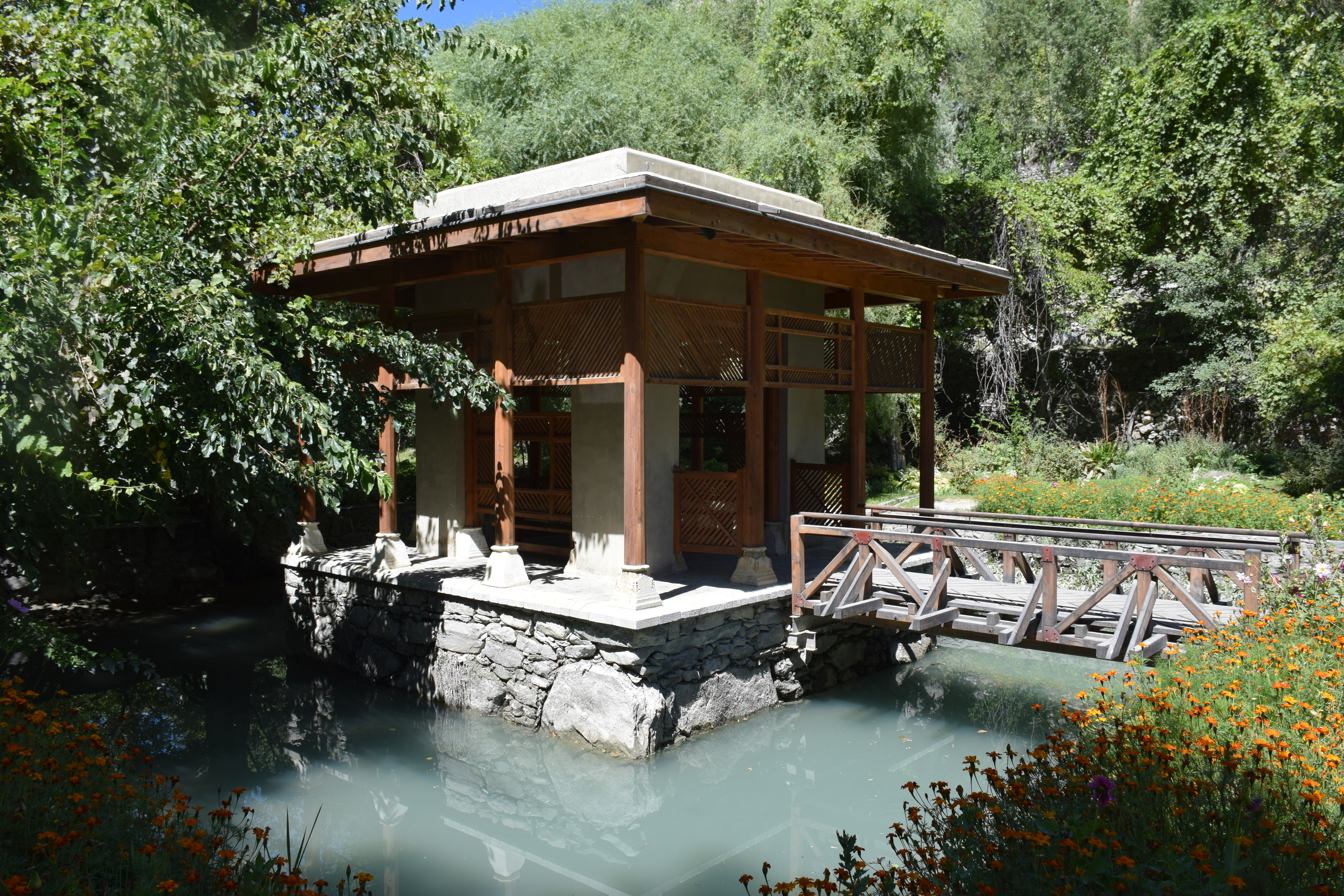
A Baradari pavilion, a square-shaped structure in the Mughal style garden on the east side of the fort.

== See also ==
- Altit Palace
- Baltit Palace
- Khaplu Palace
- List of palaces in Pakistan
- List of museums in Pakistan
