= Mankera Fort =

Castle in Pakistan

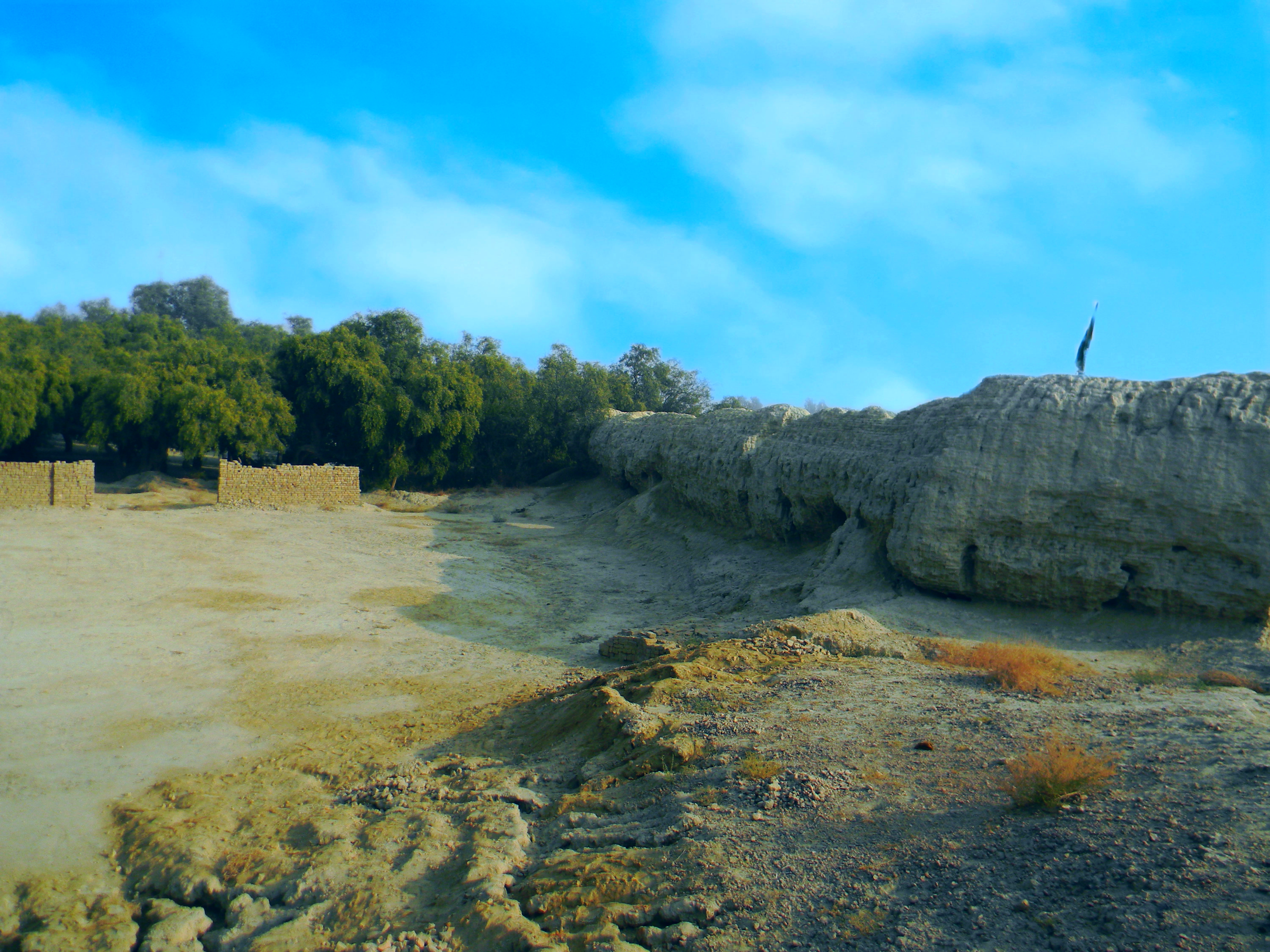
- Ruins of Mankera Fort

General information
- Location: Mankera, Punjab, Pakistan
- Coordinates: 31°23′07″N 71°26′19″E
- Year(s) built: 1804-1816

Mankera Fort is a ruined fort situated in the Thal Desert in Mankera, Punjab, Pakistan.

== History ==
The construction of the fort began under Nawab Sarbuland Khan Sadozai, the last Muslim ruler of Mankera, in 1804 and was completed after his death in 1816.

The site of the fort has historical significance dating back to 540 CE, when Raja Mal Khira of the Mal tribe established the Mal Khir Kot fortress, which later evolved into Mankera. Following various rulers, including Arab and Muslim dynasties, the fort underwent several renovations. During their rule, the Mekan tribe also contributed to the fort's maintenance.

In 1380 CE, the fort underwent major renovations, including heightened walls and additional defensive structures. Over three centuries, successive rulers, including the Langah, Hot, Mirani, Rind, Jiskani, and Kalhora Balochs, maintained and modified the fort.

The fort saw further development under Nawab Sarbuland Khan, including the addition of a mosque in 1804. However, following the Sikh invasion led by Ranjit Singh in 1821, the mosque was repurposed, and a nearby Hindu temple was established. After this period, the fort suffered from neglect, leading to a gradual decline in its structural integrity.

== Architecture ==
Spanning around fifty acres, the fort features defensive walls that are twenty feet high and over twenty feet thick, with four gates and corresponding towers at each cardinal point, each exceeding 45 feet in height.

The fort's original design included a moat, forty feet wide and fifteen feet deep, accompanied by twelve adjacent wells. However, the internal gardens that once existed are no longer present.

== See also ==
- Dilkusha Bagh
