= Aga Khan Historic Cities Programme =

Project of the Aga Khan Trust for Culture

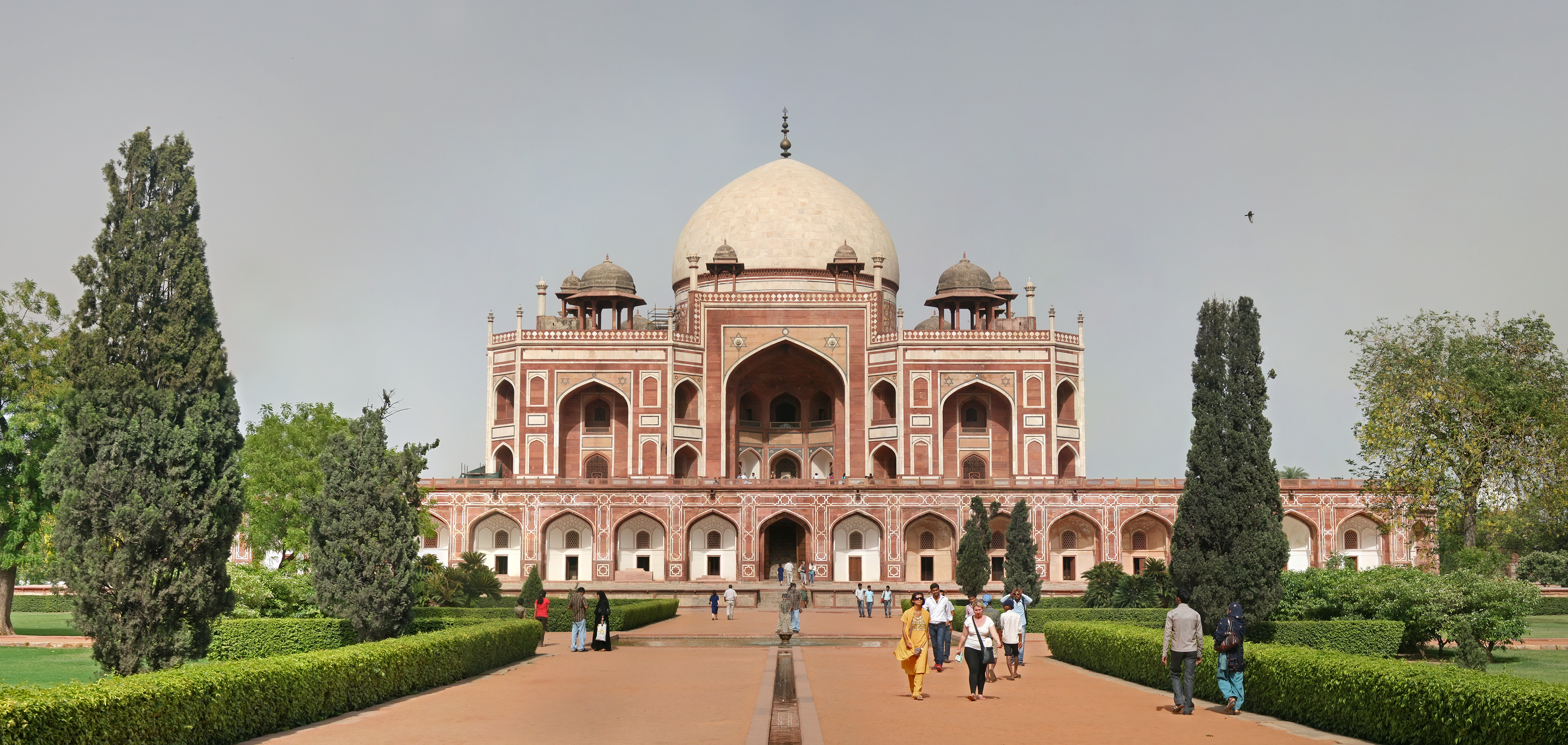
Tomb of Humayun in Delhi, India

The Historic Cities Programme (HCP) of the Aga Khan Trust for Culture (AKTC) promotes the conservation and re-use of buildings and public spaces in historic cities of the Muslim world. HCP undertakes the restoration and rehabilitation of historic structures and public spaces in ways that can spur social, economic and cultural development. Individual projects go beyond technical restoration to address the questions of the social and environmental context, adaptive reuse, institutional sustainability and training. In several countries, local Aga Khan Cultural Service companies have been formed to implement projects under the supervision of the HCSP headquarters in Geneva.

== Role of the HCP ==
The HCP works closely with all project stakeholders, including the community. The programme is able to provide planning assistance to government and local conservation bodies. It provides technical expertise and can help to secure funding and resources by defining opportunities and approaches, preparing feasibility studies, and shaping proposals for submission to local investors and international agencies.

It also participates in urban conservation and development efforts that focus on building clusters, public spaces between and around buildings, a district, or a historic town. These projects aim to restore and maintain the socioeconomic and cultural fabric of the designated area. The programme also engages in restoring specific historic sites and buildings that include elements of urban landscape or single structures, for which appropriate new functions are developed to meet the social and economic needs of the respective communities.

The programme is concerned with the long-term viability of its conservation projects and does support associated cultural initiatives in this regard. All enabling development factors – community support, innovative institutional structures, and commercial potential – are harnessed, whenever possible, to make conservation sustainable.

== Funding sources ==
HCP plans and executes projects with funding from the Aga Khan Trust for Culture and other donors. Institutions, such as the Getty Grant Program, World Monuments Fund, the Ford Foundation, the Swiss, Swedish and Norwegian bilateral aid organisations, and the World Bank have sponsored or co-funded HCSP activities. HCSP establishes local service companies as partners in implementation and prepares them for autonomous operation as self-sustaining community organisations.

== Projects ==
The Historic Cities Programme has been involved in nearly twenty distinct revitalisation projects in Afghanistan, the Northern Areas of Pakistan, Zanzibar, Samarkand, Cairo, Mostar (Bosnia), Mali and Syria. In all project locations, community participation, training of local professionals and local institution-building are essential components.

- Restoration of the Great Mosque of Mopti, Mali
- Restoration of the gardens of Humayun's Tomb in Delhi, India
- Conservation of Forts in Hunza and Baltistan, Pakistan
- Restoration and conservation of old neighbourhoods of Kabul, Afghanistan
- Conservation of the sixteenth-century Bagh-e Babur (Babur's Gardens) in Kabul, Afghanistan
- Repair and conservation of the late eighteenth-century mausoleum of Timur Shah in Kabul, Afghanistan
- Conservation of structures and upgrading of infrastructure in the old city of Herat, Afghanistan
- Repairs to the shrine complex of Khoja Abdullah Ansari, dating from the Timurid period in Gozargah, Afghanistan
- Restoration of structures and conservation planning in Old Stone Town, Zanzibar
- Creation of the 30 hectare Al-Azhar Park from a garbage dump in Cairo, Egypt
- Preparation of a new master plan for the Timurid city in Samarkand, Uzbekistan
- Restoration of key monuments, historic buildings and open spaces in the old city of Mostar, Bosnia
- Provision of technical assistance and training to the Directorate of Antiquities in Syria for the conservation and management of three major citadels in Aleppo, Masyaf and Qalat Salah ed-Din

== Awards and recognition ==
- 2007 Time: The Best of Asia Awards – Best Historic Restoration awarded for the restoration of Bagh-e Babur (Babur's Gardens) in Kabul, Afghanistan.
- 2006 UNESCO Asia-Pacific Heritage Awards for Cultural Heritage Conservation – Award of Excellence for the restoration of the Shigar Fort Palace in Skardu, Northern Pakistan
- 2006 PATA GOLD Award for Heritage and Culture awarded for the restoration and re-use of Shigar Fort Palace in Skardu, Northern Pakistan
- 2005 UNESCO Asia Pacific Heritage Conservation Award of Merit for the conservation of Amburiq Mosque in Shigar, Baltistan, Pakistan
- 2005 Time Asia, Best of Asia Award for the Baltit Fort, Hunza Valley, Pakistan
- 2005 Travel + Leisure Global Vision Innovation Award for Al-Azhar Park in Cairo, Egypt
- 2004 UNESCO Asia-Pacific Heritage Awards for Cultural Conservation – Award of Excellence for the restoration of the 700-year-old Baltit Fort in Northern Pakistan
- 2003 UNESCO Asia-Pacific Heritage Awards for Cultural Conservation – Award of Distinction for the restoration of the 300-year-old mausoleum of Syed Mir Muhammad in Khaplu, Baltistan, Pakistan
- 2002 UNESCO Asia-Pacific Heritage Awards for Cultural Conservation – Award of Distinction for the restoration of four 300-year-old wooden mosques in Pakistan's Hunza Valley
- 2000 Tourism for Tomorrow Awards: Global Winner – Karimabad and Baltit project development, Pakistan

== See also ==
- Aga Khan Award for Architecture
- Aga Khan Development Network
- Islamic architecture

== Sources ==
- "Rescuing Cairo's Lost Heritage". Islamica Magazine. 2006. Archived from the original on October 26, 2006.
