= Dalel Dero Fort =

Fortress in Shaheed Benazirabad district, Pakistan

Dalel Dero Fort دلیل ڈیرو قلعہ
- Interactive map of the Dalel Dero Fort دلیل ڈیرو قلعہ area

General information
- Location: Shaheed Benazirabad District, Sindh, Pakistan
- Coordinates: 26°10′28″N 68°17′47″E
- Year built: 18th-19th Century CE

Dalel Dero Fort is a fortress located in Nawabshah Tehsil of Shaheed Benazirabad District in Sindh, Pakistan.

== History ==
Dalel Dero Fort was built during the Talpurs' rule in Sindh, which lasted from 1783 to 1843 CE.

According to local tradition, the fort was constructed during the reign of Talpurs by one Nawab Daleel Khan Magsi. Another version is that it was got repaired by Mian Nur Mohammad Khan Talpur

In 2018, it was recognised as a cultural heritage site of the Sindh province.

== Architecture ==
The fort is characterized by its unique circular design and a rectangular gateway complex. It has a perimeter of 836.8 meters and walls that stand 12 meters tall. The construction materials used in the fort include mud bricks, burnt bricks, mud mortar, and cheroli, a type of lime plaster.

The main entrance of the fort features a four-centered arch, which leads to four chambers that were likely used by guards. The fort also has 12 bastions distributed along its walls.
