= Birmoghlasht Summer Fort =

Fort in Pakistan

- Interactive map of the Birmoghlasht Summer Fort area

General information
- Location: Lower Chitral District, Khyber Pakhtunkhwa, Pakistan, Pakistan
- Coordinates: 35.884463°N 71.766191°E
- Elevation: 9,000 feet

The Birmoghlasht Summer Fort is a dilapidated fort of the former ruler of Chitral State. It is perched on top of a hill at an elevation of about 9,000 feet. It is located in what is now a core area of the Chitral Gol National Park.

== History ==
The Birmoghlasht Summer Fort was built around 1910 on the initiative of His Highness Shuja ul-Mulk. During the existence of the Chitral State the Mehtar and his family would move to the fort in the summer to enjoy the cooler temperatures and also to hold court.

The fort is situated in close proximity to core areas of the Chitral Gol National Park which is home to snow leopards, markhors, ibexes, black bears, red foxes, otters, golden eagles, cranes, falcons, snow partridge and many other species of wildlife.

== Currently ==
The Birmoghlasht Summer Fort which attracted many foreign ambassadors when Chitral was still a princely state, now lures hundreds of tourists each year.
