= Harkishan Garh Fort =

Fort in Haripur, Pakistan

- Interactive map of the Harkishan Garh Fort area

General information
- Location: Haripur, Khyber Pakhtunkhwa, Pakistan
- Coordinates: 34°00′06″N 72°56′26″E
- Estimated completion: 1822–23

Harkishan Garh Fort is a fort in Haripur, Khyber Pakhtunkhwa, Pakistan.

== History ==
Harkishan Garh Fort was erected under the supervision of Governor Sardar Hari Singh Nalwa in 1822–23, subsequent to the Sikh annexation of Kashmir and Hazara. The fort features a 20-feet deep moat, designed for the defence of the Sikh garrison.

Initially, the fort was built to consolidate the Sikh control over the region and to serve as a launchpad for further expansion. From 1849 to 1853, the fort also functioned as the district headquarters for the British administration, until Major James Abbott moved it to Abbottabad.

On 2nd of June 1847 Abbott (then boundary commissioner) described arriving in the area in his journal: "Marched to Hurkishengurh, or Hurripoor, the latter being the name of the city. It is very slowly recovering from the plunder and violence it received owing to the infamous conduct of Its Governor, Moolraj. Confidence is not yet restored. The walls are still in ruins and it is not protected by the fort, simply because the garrison must not be expected to sally for its rescue. I begged the Dewan, Adjoodhia Pershaud, to take immediate steps towards repairing the walls and gates. The people will fear to return to it in Its present defenceless condition. Hurkishengurh, the fort, is a smart little castle of earth with the most formidable of military obstacles, a wide and very deep ditch, which can be flooded at pleasure. It is in tolerable repair standing about a quarter of a mile east of the city."

Following Pakistan's inception, the police department claimed the western portion of the fort, while the revenue department took control of the eastern part. Both entities have reportedly maintained their presence in the fort, with modifications allegedly made in contravention of the Antiquities Act.

The municipal administration, tasked with conserving historical sites, is also reported to have built an overhead water tank on the fort's western section.

In 2019, the Government of Khyber Pakhtunkhwa decided to convert it into a museum.
