= Taragarh Palace =

Palace and Hotel in Palampur

Coordinates: 32°03′50″N 76°37′03″E

- Interactive map of the Taragarh Palace area

General information
- Location: Palampur, India
- Completed: c. 1931
- Client: Sadiq Muhammad Khan Abbasi V
- Owner: Karan Singh

Website
- https://taragarhpalace.com/

Taragarh Palace, situated in Palampur, Himachal Pradesh, was formerly known as Al-Hilal Palace (English: The Crescent Palace) and served as the summer residence of the Amir of Bahawalpur. In 1950, it was acquired by the royal family of Jammu and Kashmir, following which it was renamed Taragarh. It now operates as a heritage hotel.

== History ==
This palace was constructed in 1931 for Sadiq Muhammad Khan Abbasi V, the Amir of Bahawalpur. It was designed to serve as his summer retreat. It was here that Sadiq's grandson, Salahuddin Abbasi, was born on 27 July 1946.

Following the Partition of India, the property came under the control of the Government of Punjab. Some time after partition, Tara Devi, the Maharani of Jammu and Kashmir approached Jawaharlal Nehru to request permission to acquire a residence in Kangra. In response, Nehru suggested that she apply to the Government of Punjab for possession of Al-Hilal. Accordingly, she approached the Government of Punjab in 1950 and purchased it from them for the sum of Rs 800,000. She subsequently renamed it Taragarh after herself. She continued to reside at the palace until her death in 1967, after which ownership passed to her son, Karan Singh. In 1971, Karan Singh converted the property into a heritage hotel.

== Description ==
The palace was built in a European architectural style. Within its grounds, Sadiq Muhammad Khan V Abbasi laid out extensive gardens. He also built in it a glass pleasure pavilion, a mosque, and a swimming pool. The glass pleasure pavilion was later converted into a mandir by Tara Devi.

The mandir within the complex remains maintained and continues to serve as a site of worship. On Thursday nights, marking the eve of Jumu'ah, a candle is lit inside the mosque in remembrance of Sadiq Muhammad Khan V Abbasi.

== Gallery ==
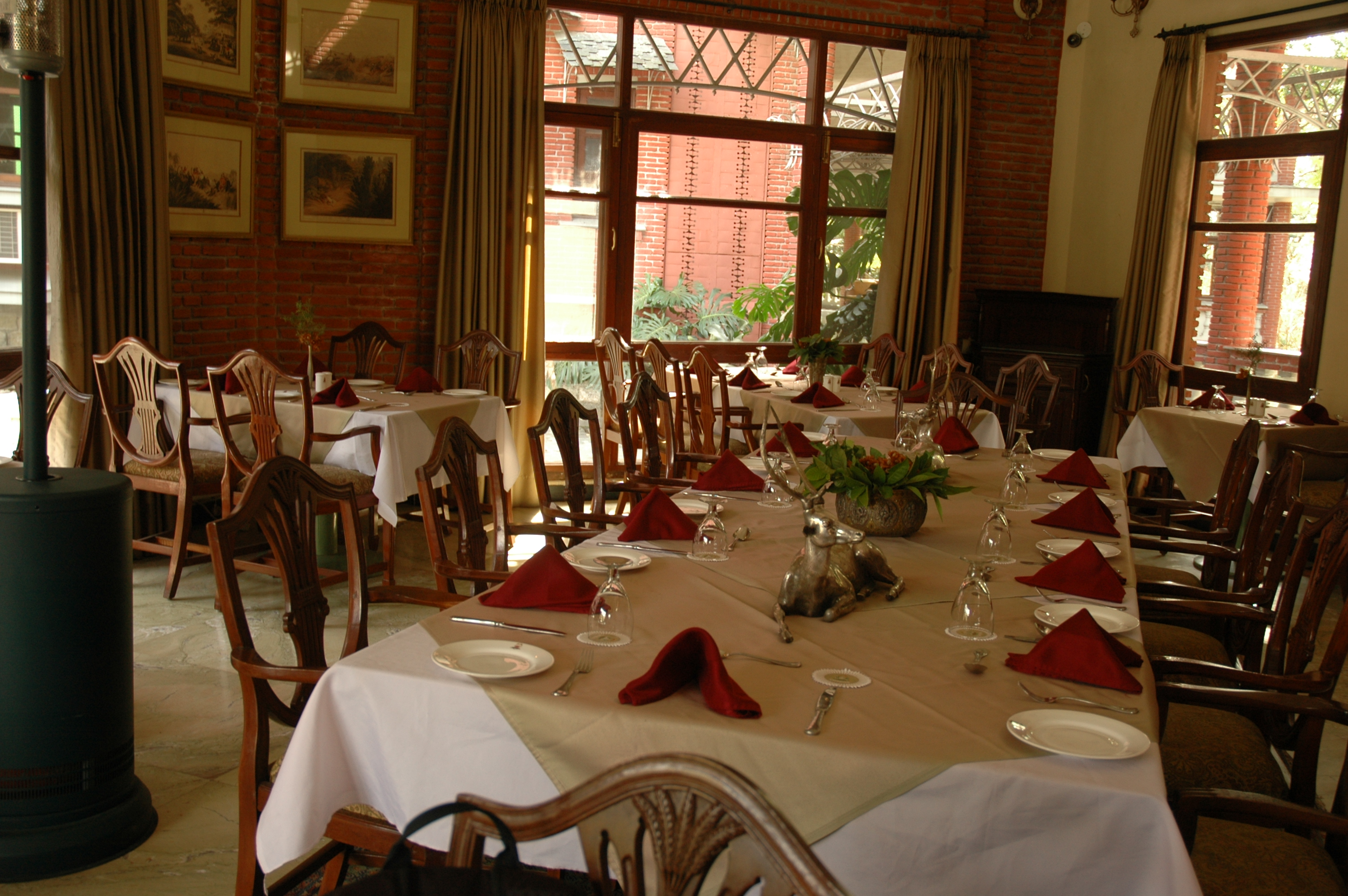

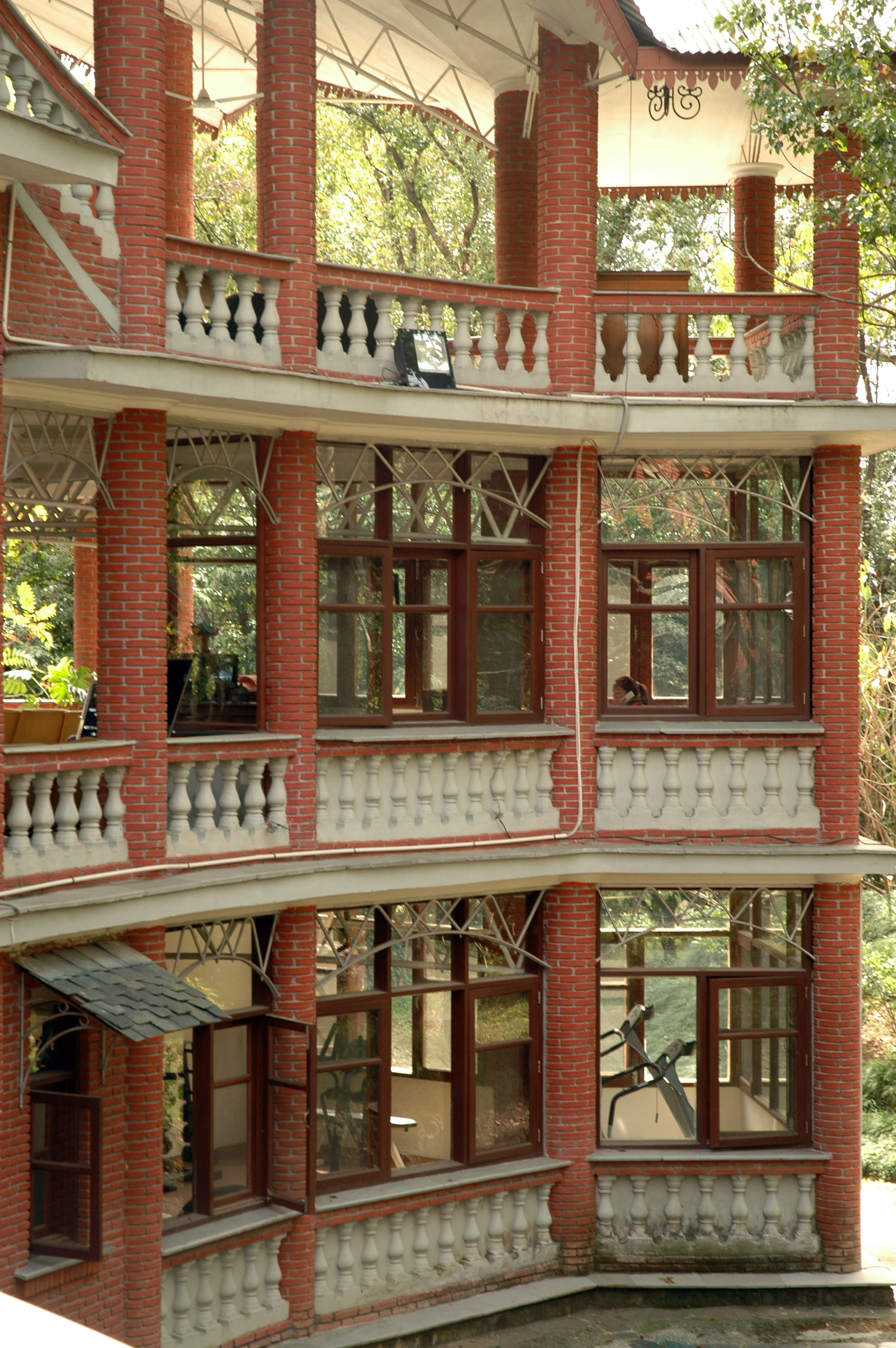

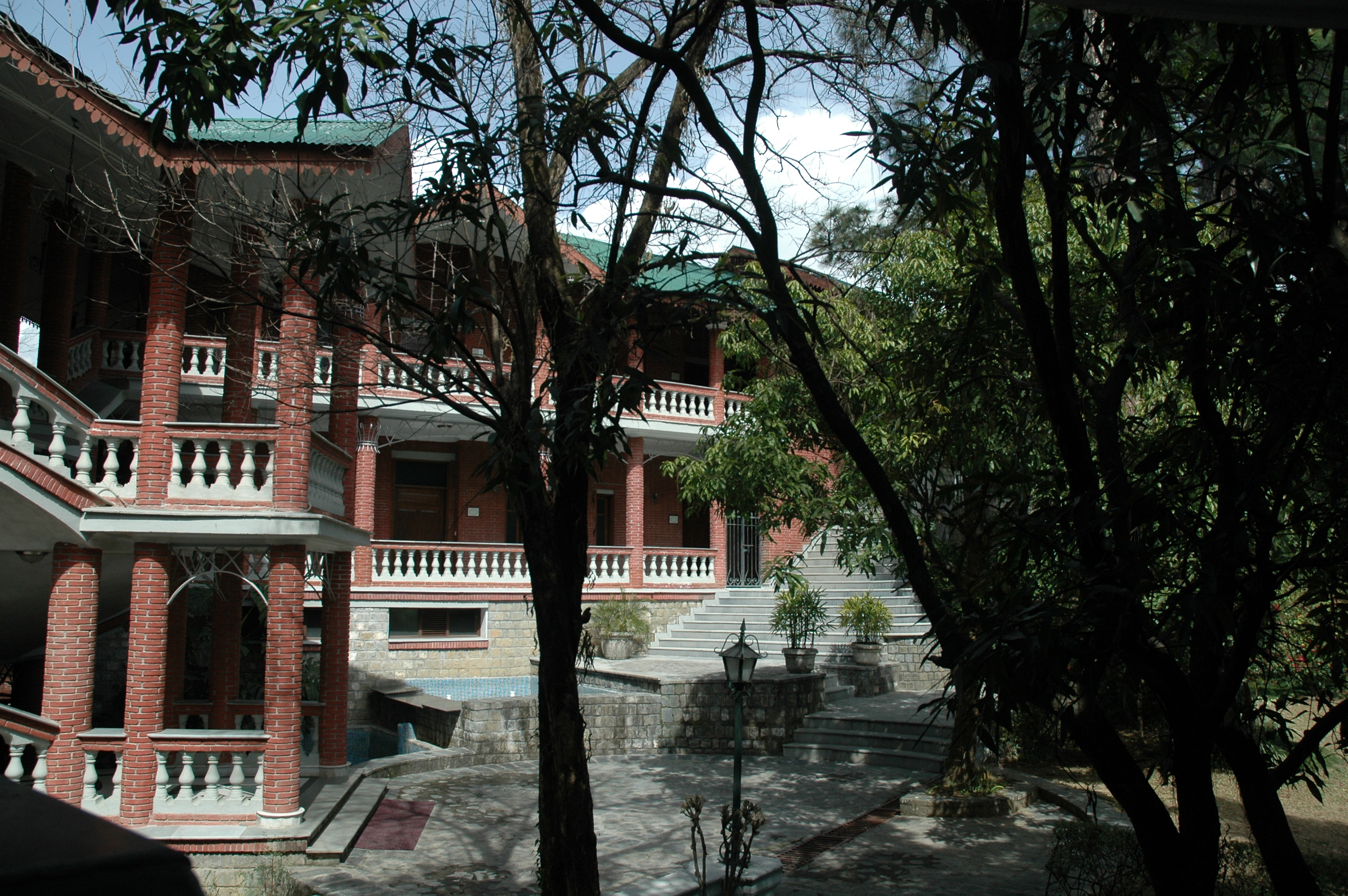

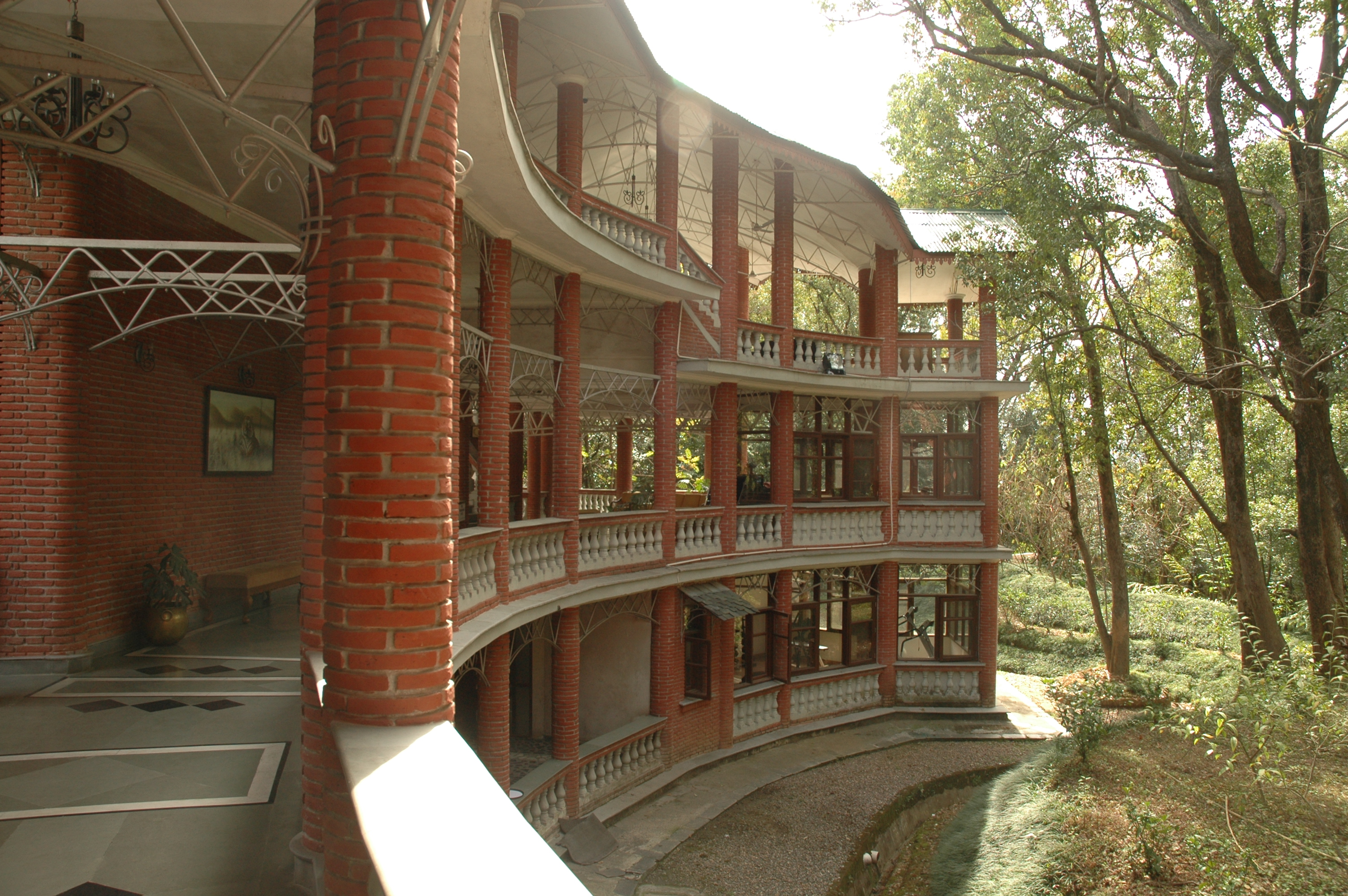
