= Bahawalpur National Awami Party =

Bahawalpur National Awami Party بہاولپور نیشنل عوامی پارٹی
- Abbreviation: BNAP
- Chairman: Nawab Salahuddin Abbasi
- Founder: Nawab Salahuddin Abbasi
- Founded: 2010

Bahawalpur National Awami Party (Urdu: بہاولپور نیشنل عوامی پارٹی) is a Pakistani Punjabi political party formed in 2010 by Nawab Salahuddin Abbasi.

Nawab Salahuddin Abbasi was a Member of Parliament. He is also the Grandson of Nawab Sadeq Mohammad Khan V, of Abbasi Dynasty, who was the last ruling Nawab of the princely state of Bahawalpur. He has been elected five times as Member of National Assembly from the city Ahmadpur East. He is also the Chief of Bahawalpur National Awami Party (BNAP) which was allied with Pakistan Tehreek-i-Insaf's Imran Khan government. Nawab Salahuddin Abbasi is also a strong campaigner of restoration of Bahawalpur province and an influential personality of Southern Punjab.

Ahead of the 2024 elections, the party was delisted by the Election Commission of Pakistan for failing to conduct intra-party elections; therefore, it was unable to contest any seats.
