= Sadeq Mohammad Khan IV =

Sadiq Muhammad Abbasi IV
- Amir
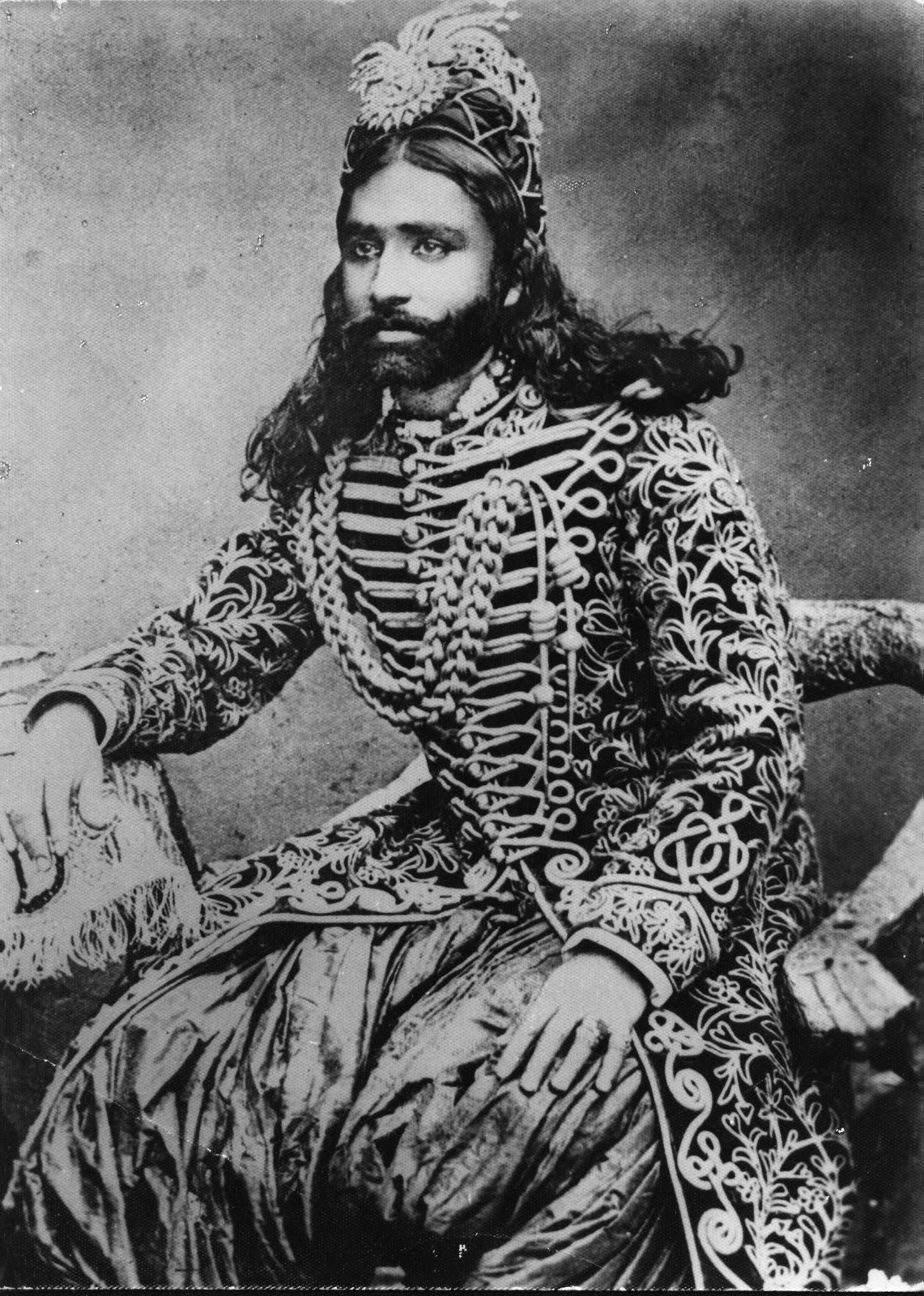
- Official portrait, c. 1870s–1880s

12th Nawab of Bahawalpur
- Reign: 25 March 1866 – 14 February 1899
- Predecessor: Nawab Bahawal Khan IV
- Successor: Mohammad Bahawal Khan V
- Born: 11 November 1861; Bahawalpur, Bahawalpur State, British India (today Pakistan)
- Died: 14 February 1899 (aged 37); Bahawalpur, Bahawalpur State, British India (present-day Punjab, Pakistan)
- Issue: Bahawal Khan V
- House: Daudputra dynasty
- Father: Nawab Bahawal Khan IV
- Religion: Islam

Sadiq Muhammad Khan IV (Urdu: صادق محمد خان چہارم; 1861–1899) was the 12th Nawab of Bahawalpur who ruled the Bahawalpur State from 1879 to 1899 under the supervision of the British Raj. He died in 1899 and was succeeded by his eldest son Bahawal Khan V.

== Biography ==
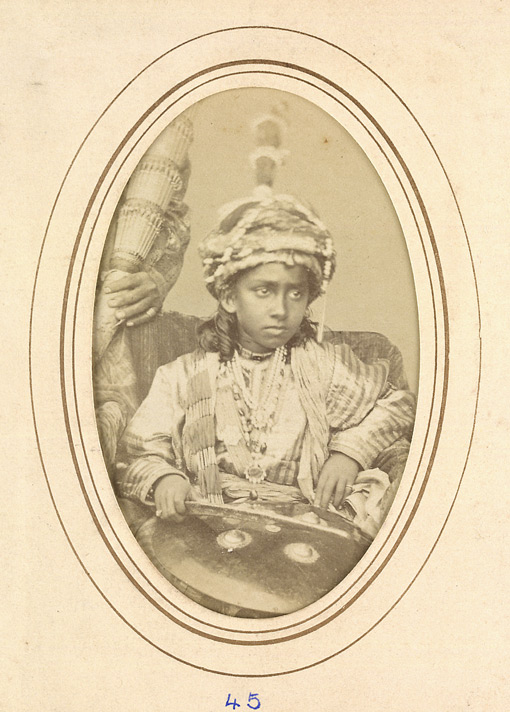
Photograph of Sadiq Muhammad Khan as a child

Sadiq Muhammad Khan Bahadur was born in 1861. He became Nawab of Bahawalpur on 25 March 1866, after the death of his father Mohammad Bahawal Khan IV. As he was still a minor, the British temporarily administered the region. He was invested with full ruling powers at Derawar Fort on 28 November 1879. During his governance, he ordered for construction of many buildings in Bahawalpur including Daulat Khana, Sadiq Garh Palace, Noor Mahal and Gulzar Mahal.

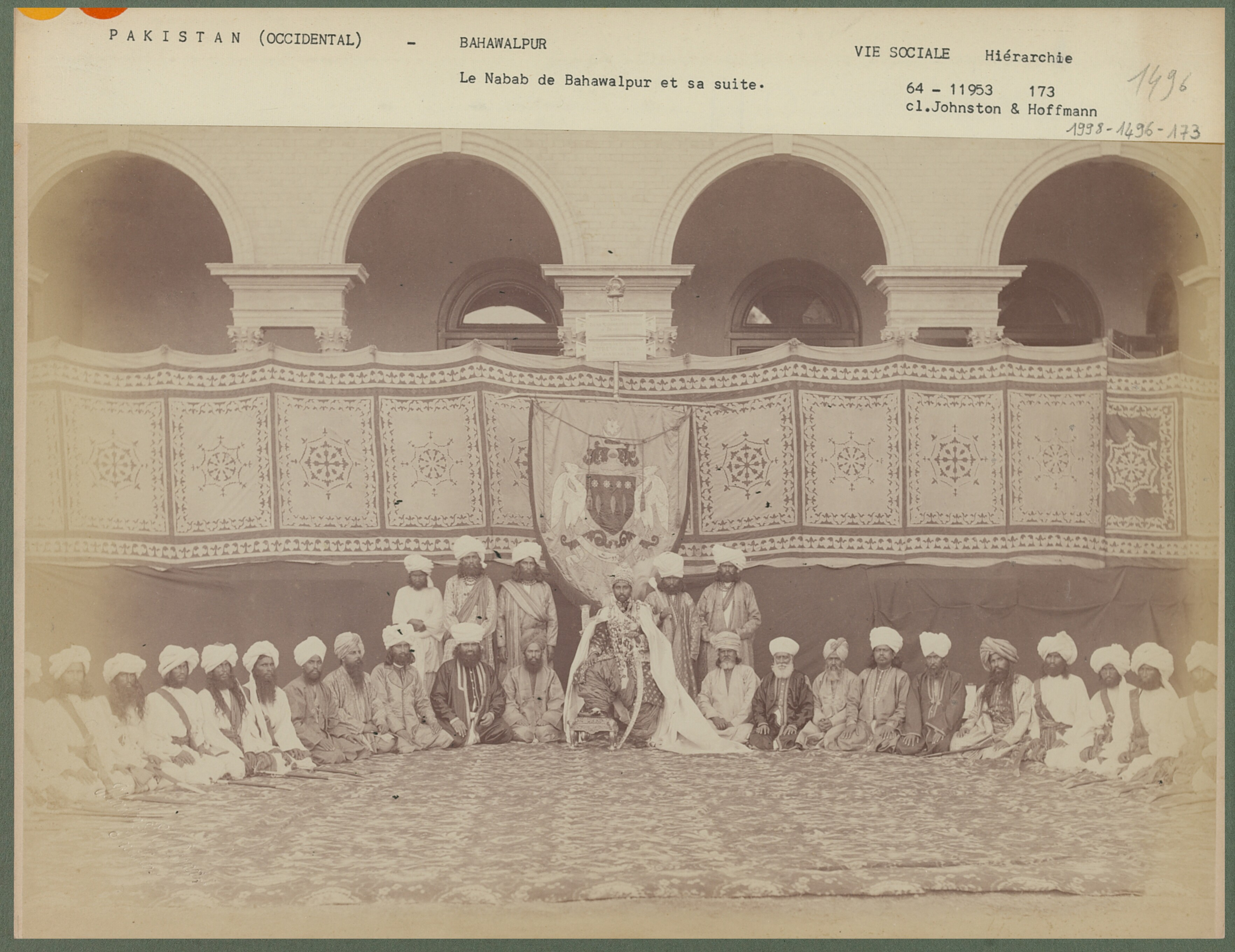
Photograph of the Nawab of Bahawalpur State and suite, by Johnston & Hoffmann, c. 1870s–80s

In an 1899 account published in the Century Magazine, R.D. Mackenzie portrayed the Nawab as a representative of Indian royalty. According to him, the Nawab chose to reside in a simple, square, flat-roofed palace within his estate, surrounded by buildings in various states of disrepair. The account provides a detailed portrayal of the Nawab's lifestyle, which included traditional hunts, dances, and lavish displays of wealth, such as a jewel-encrusted sword and a famous diamond crown. He also mentions the Nawab's energetic personality, implying that it may have been intensified by substance use, which ultimately contributed to his early death.
