= Abbas Abbasi =

Pakistani politician

Muhammad Abbas Khan Abbasi His Highness
- محمد عباس خان عباسی
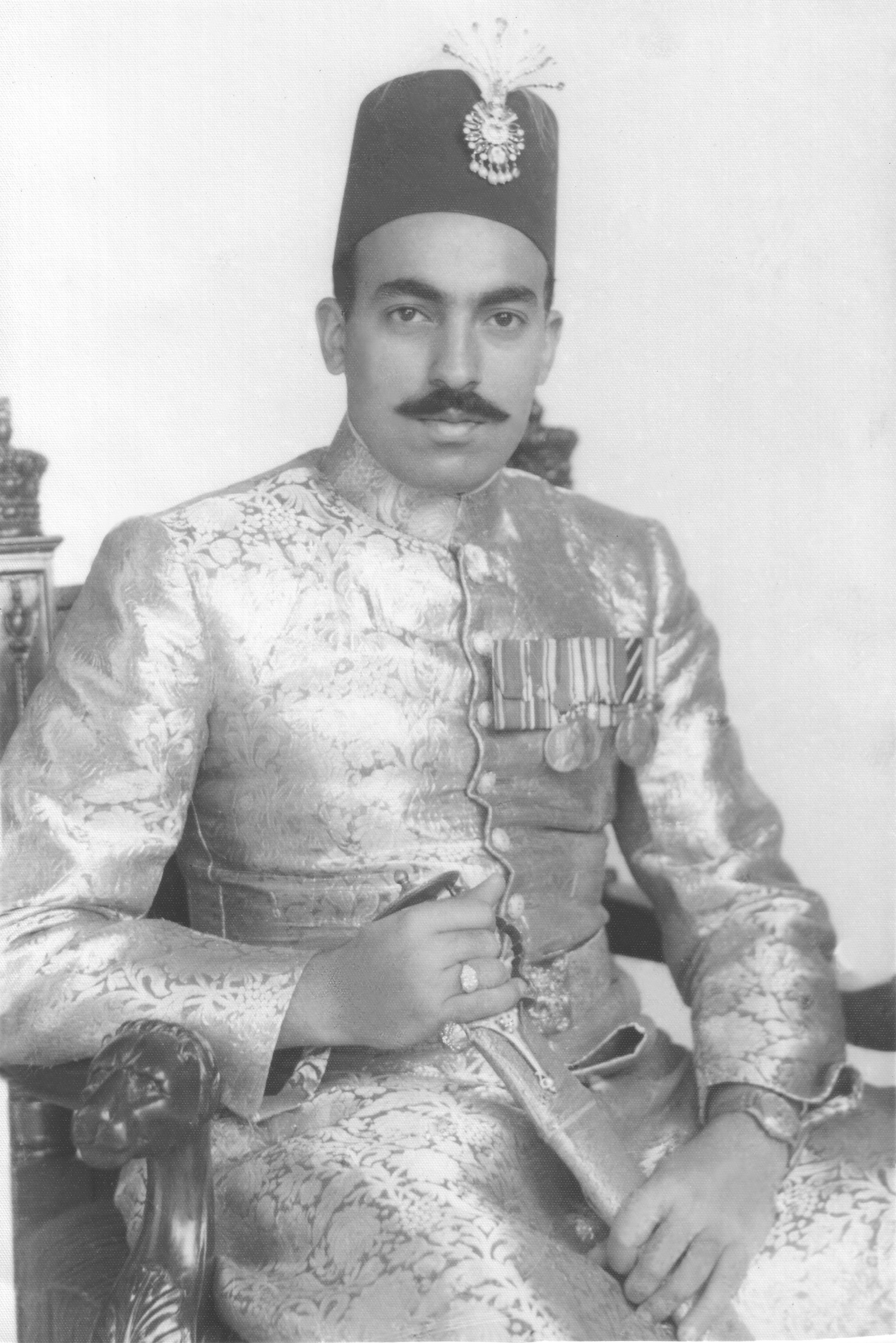
- Abbasi as Nawab

Federal Minister for Religious Affairs
- In office 15 March 1981 – 18 March 1984
- Preceded by: Muhammad Zia-ul-Haq
- Succeeded by: Raja Zafar-ul-Haq

Emir of the Bahawalpur State
- In office 25 May 1966 – 14 March 1988

18th Governor of Punjab
- In office 31 July 1975 – 5 July 1977
- President: Fazal Ilahi Chaudhry
- Prime Minister: Zulfiqar Ali Bhutto
- Preceded by: Ghulam Mustafa Khar
- Succeeded by: Aslam Riaz Hussain

Personal details
- Born: 22 March 1924 Bahawalpur (princely state)
- Died: 14 April 1988 (aged 64) London, United Kingdom
- Spouse: Shamsa Parveen Abbasi (m. 1945)
- Children: Salahuddin Abbasii; Falahuddin Abbasi; Aiyesha Yasmien Abbasi; Nausheen Abbasi
- Parent: Sadiq Muhammad Khan Abbasi V (father)
- Relatives: S.M. Abbasi (brother); Sahibzada Muzammil-ur-Rashid Abbasi (nephew)
- Education: Aitchison College

Military service
- Allegiance: Pakistan
- Branch/service: Pakistan Army
- Rank: Brigadier

Muhammad Abbas Khan Abbasi (Urdu: محمد عباس خان عباسی; 24 March 1924 – 14 March 1988) also known as Alhaj Mohammad Abbas Khan Abbasi, was the Nawab and later Amir of the Bahawalpur State. He was also a Brigadier in the Pakistani Army, Governor of Punjab and member of the Bahawalpur royal family.

He became Nawab on the death of his father General Nawab Sir Sadiq Muhammad Khan V Abbasi on 24 May 1966.

As head of the Royal House of Bahawalpur, he was recognized as "Ameer of Bahawalpur State" by the then Government of Pakistan led by Field Marshal Ayub Khan.

== Early life, family, and education ==
Abbasi was born on 22 March 1924 to Sadiq Muhammad Khan Abbasi V. He was educated at Aitchison College in Lahore, where he passed his senior and higher Cambridge examinations. Following this, he took an administrative course at Dehradun from 1942 to 1943. He married Shamsa Parveen Abbasi, a daughter of Maulvi Shams-ud-Din. By her, he had two sons, Salahuddin Abbasi and Falahuddin Abbasi, and two daughters, Aiyesha Yasmien Abbasi and Nausheen Abbasi. He has several siblings most notably S.M. Abbasi.

== Military career ==
He was commissioned in the state forces of Bahawalpur and attached to the 5th Battalion, the Grenadiers. He saw active service in India and Iran in 1943. He visited the Burma Front in 1944. He served in the recruiting branch of Headquarters at Lahore from 1943 to 1944.

== Public career ==
He was deputy to the Prime Minister/President of the States Army.

== Death ==
He died on 14 April 1988 and was succeeded by Salahuddin Abbasi as the Amir of Bahawalpur.
