= John Dring =

British colonial administrator (1902–1991)

Sir John Dring KBE CIE
- John Dring c. 1935

Prime Minister of Bahawalpur
- In office 1948–1952
- Monarch: Sir Sadiq Mohammed Khan V Abbasi
- Preceded by: Sir Richard Marsh Crofton
- Succeeded by: A.R. Khan

Personal details
- Born: 4 November 1902 Calcutta, Bengal Presidency, British India (now West Bengal, India)
- Died: 16 June 1991 (aged 88) England

Lieutenant Colonel Sir Arthur John Dring KBE CIE JP (4 November 1902 – 16 June 1991) was the second prime minister of the princely state of Bahawalpur (now in modern Pakistan). He was also the senior member of the Indian Political Service in the last decades of the British Raj, assistant private secretary to the governor-general of India and an advisor to governments on plebiscites for two former British colonies in Africa. Dring Stadium, the site of the second test cricket match of the India-Pakistan test series in 1955, is named after him. He was called John throughout his life.

== Early life ==
Dring was born on 4 November 1902 in Calcutta, Bengal Presidency, British India, the second child and only son of Sir William Arthur Dring and his wife Lady Jane Reid Greenshields Dring (née Ross, formerly Alston). The Dring family had been resident in India since 1830. Dring spent his earliest years in India, but was sent to school in England aged 6 years, as was customary for members of elite families in British India. He attended Winchester College and RMC Sandhurst. He returned to India in 1923 and joined the Guides Cavalry as a lieutenant.

== Political career ==
In 1927, Dring joined the Indian Political Service and soon became assistant private secretary to the viceroy of India. The Channel 4 historical drama Indian Summers revolves around a fictional character called Ralph Whelan who was the private secretary to the viceroy of India in Shimla in 1932–1935. The character of Ralph Whelan has several similarities with the real-life John Dring, who was in the same political position in the same place at the same time, with the same family history. The National Portrait Gallery of the UK holds a portrait of Dring.

Dring was the deputy commissioner of Dera Ismail Khan from 1935 to 1936. From 1937 to 1940, Dring served as secretary to Sir George Cunningham, the governor of the Northwest Frontier Province.

He then served as political agent of South Waziristan from 1939 to 1942. He was part of the Razmak column which attempted to display a show of force to anti-British tribal forces in the Waziristan campaign (1936-1939) but instead was bogged down in fighting and suffered large casualties. The failure of the Razmak column emboldened the resistance fighters and resulted in a surge in their numbers.

Dring was awarded the Companion of the Most Eminent Order of the Indian Empire in the 1943 New Year Honours. He was promoted to Lieutenant-Colonel in 1944.

Dring was the deputy commissioner of Peshawar from 1945 to 1947, president of the Peshawar Services club through 1948 and hosted Jawaharlal Nehru on his visit to the North West Frontier Province in 1946.

Following the Partition of India in 1947, Dring served as the prime minister of Bahawalpur, a Muslim-majority princely state. He was Bahawalpur's second prime minister, and last prime minister of British origin, and served from 1948 to 1952. Dring oversaw a transformation in the way of life of the people of Bahwalpur from a desert to a pastoral way of life. He supported and encouraged the Nawab in the developing over a dozen treaties with the British, in the mutual interests of both parties. The Princely State of Bahawalpur was abolished in 1955 and its people and land became part of Pakistan.

Dring Stadium in Bahawalpur is named after Dring. It was a stadium ahead of its time and was the only complete stadium in Pakistan at the time. The stadium hosted a test match in the first India-Pakistan test cricket series in 1955 and was the training ground for the first Pakistan cricket team tour of England in 1954

After his tenure as Prime Minister was complete, Dring was knighted in the 1952 Queen's Birthday Honours. Like many former British residents of India, he went to Africa after Partition. In 1955, he was appointed as advisor to the Governor of the Gold Coast on possible plebiscite arrangements in Togoland, drawing on his experiences in the transition of Bahawalpur from princely state to part of Pakistan. The plebiscite resulted in the British Togoland being integrated into Ghana. In 1959 he fulfilled a similar role as advisor to the Governor-General of Nigeria in the lead-up to the British Cameroons plebiscite. The result was the Muslim-majority Northern Cameroons voting to join Nigeria and the Christian-majority Southern Cameroons voting to join the newly independent country of Cameroon.

== Return to the UK ==
On his return to the UK, Dring was appointed a justice of the peace and was the chair of the Havant Bench for several years. He was elected to the Hampshire County Council and finished as chairman of the Police Authority. In 1973 he was appointed Deputy Lieutenant of Hampshire.

== Personal life ==
On 12 October 1934 in Karachi, Dring married Marjorie Wadham of the family who founded Wadham College, Oxford. The couple had two children. After Marjorie's death in Oxford in 1943, Dring married Alice Deborah Marshall (née Cree) in Shimla in 1946. She was known as Deborah. John and Deborah Dring were two of the subjects of Charles Allen's oral histories of British India, Plain Tales from the Raj.

Dring died in Purbrook, Hampshire, England, on 16 June 1991, aged 88 years.
