= William Arthur Dring =

- Sir William Arthur Dring in about 1905
- Born: 9 November 1859; Halifax, Nova Scotia, British North America
- Died: 24 November 1912; Gujhandi, British India

Lieutenant-Colonel Sir William Arthur Dring KCIE VD (9 November 1859 – 24 November 1912) was the Agent (ie. General Manager) of the East Indian Railway Company from 1907 until his death in a mysterious railway accident in 1912, which is commemorated by a large monument near the site. He oversaw a significant expansion of the railways in India and was Honorary ADC to the Commander-in-Chief, India. He was the father of John Dring, the second Prime Minister of the independent State of Bahawalpur (now in modern Pakistan).

== Early life ==
Dring was born on 9 November 1859 in Halifax, Nova Scotia, British North America while his father, Lieutenant (later Colonel) William Dring, was stationed there as paymaster of the 62nd (Wiltshire) Regiment of Foot. He moved to India with his family in 1865. The Dring family had been resident in India since 1830, only leaving when military service demanded it, and remained connected to the country for several generations. Dring's father was one of the sergeants who commanded the regiment after the loss of all officers during the Battle of Ferozeshah on 21 December 1845 and was wounded while protecting the Colours during the battle. Dring was educated at Taunton's College in Southampton.

== Railway career ==
In 1879, Dring joined the East Indian Railway Company as Assistant Secretary to the Agent, Sir Bradford Leslie, a pupil of Isambard Kingdom Brunel. Leslie was a well-known and successful engineer in Calcutta who designed the "bridge of boats" (or Pontoon Bridge) across the Hooghly and the Jubilee Bridge near Bandel. Leslie recognised Dring's talents and organisational ability and posted him to the traffic department, where he became an expert in railway traffic matters.

In 1896, Dring was promoted to General Traffic Manager of the East Indian Railway Company, a post which he held for over ten years. Dring was noted for his ingenious solutions to transport problems. In January 1903 a grand Durbar was to be held in Delhi to celebrate the coronation of King Edward VII, King of Great Britain and the self-styled King-Emperor of India. Over 12,000 people had to be conveyed from Bengal to Delhi for the Durbar in just a few days, whereas in an ordinary month only about 400 1st and 2nd class passengers made the trip. The problem of transporting them all seemed insurmountable until Dring hit upon the solution of taking bogie frames that had been prepared for lower class stock and converting them into temporary sleeping carriages for the higher class passengers. This step was said to have saved the situation.

In 1907, Dring was appointed Agent (ie. General Manager) of the East Indian Railway Company, being the first traffic officer to reach that rank. Under Dring's leadership as General Traffic Manager then Agent, the Company flourished and grew in size and complexity. Its mileage increased from 1887 to 2600 miles, passenger and freight traffic increased and efficiency was improved.

In recognition of his significant contribution, Dring was awarded the Companion of the Most Eminent Order of the Indian Empire in the 1909 New Year Honours and then was made Knight Commander of the Most Eminent Order of the Indian Empire by King George V at the 1911 Delhi Durbar Honours. Dring was Lieutenant Colonel Commandant, East Indian Railway Volunteer Rifles, and Honorary Aide-de-camp to the Commander-in-Chief, India. He was the 5th President of The Saturday Club in Calcutta for 3 terms from 1906 to 1909 and was also President of Bengal Club in 1911. He was a member of the Oriental Club for gentlemen who had spent a large part of their lives in India.

== Personal life ==
Dring married a widow, Jane Reid Greenshields Alston, on 18 January 1899 and had two children: Helen Marian Dring (born 1899) who was awarded the Kaisar-i-Hind Medal in recognition of her work during the 1942 evacuation of Burma; and John Dring (born 1902), who was the second Prime Minister of the independent State of Bahawalpur (now in modern Pakistan).

== Death at Gujhandi ==
After his investiture in 1912, Dring left India for a six-month holiday in England and returned by mail steamer on 22 November. As Agent of the East Indian Railway Company, Dring had his own saloon car, being the second last carriage, followed only by the brake van. The saloon car had a bedroom, dining room, office and kitchen, with servants' quarters at the rear. At the end it had an observation platform with a three-foot railing. On the morning of 24 November 1912, Dring was still in his pyjamas when the train arrived at Gujhandi 33 minutes late. Dring advised the Station Master to telegraph ahead to the next station to ensure that there was plenty of water available for the engine. That was the last time anyone saw Dring alive.

When Dring's servant entered the saloon with his shaving kit and clothes, Dring was nowhere to be seen, although his slippers were lying on the observation platform at the rear of the saloon. About two kilometres from Gujhandi, a railway signalman spotted a white man standing between two carriages of the moving train, who appeared to be in difficulty. Half a kilometre further away, a gang of railway workers bent forward in homage to the train and when they raised their bodies they saw what they thought was a pile of white rope on the track. When one of them went to investigate, they found the lifeless body of Dring, face down on the track with a severe head wound.

How the accident occurred is a mystery, although a friend who had frequently travelled with Dring said that he had the habit of sipping his morning tea on the railing of the observation platform. Perhaps a jolt of the train or some unexpected movement had thrown him off, but how a man of Dring's experience and competence could have fallen during his daily routine has not been explained.

Dring's death was a shock for Calcutta society, both Indian and European, as he was well-known and popular. He was given a large military funeral which The Statesman called "The biggest and most impressive of the kind seen in Calcutta for many years." The Indian staff of the East Indian Railway Company raised a subscription to erect an enormous obelisk at the site of Dring's demise, and it remains there to this day.
