= Abbasi Mosque =

Mosque in Bahawalpur, Punjab, Pakistan

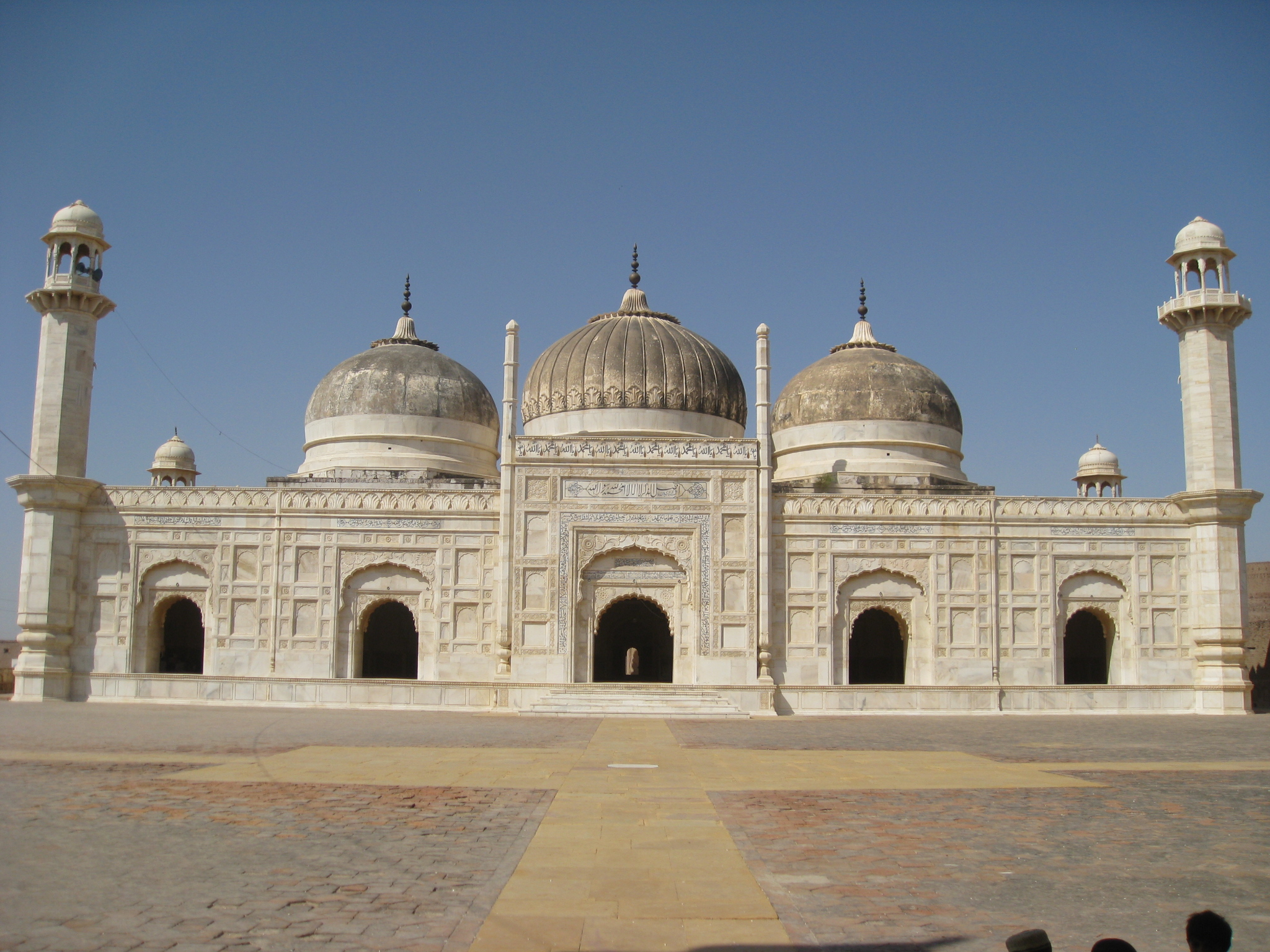

Religion
- Affiliation: Islam
- Ecclesiastical or organisational status: Mosque
- Status: Active

Location
- Location: Yazman Tehsil, Bahawalpur District, Punjab
- Country: Pakistan
- Interactive map of Abbasi Mosque
- Coordinates: 28°46′3″N 71°20′13″E

Architecture
- Type: Mosque architecture
- Founder: Nawab Bahawal Khan
- Completed: 1849

Specifications
- Capacity: 10,000 worshippers
- Length: 39 m (128 ft)
- Width: 4.9 m (16 ft)
- Dome: Three
- Minaret: Two

The Abbasi Mosque, or Derawar Mosque, and locally known as Jamia Masjid‑e‑Abbasi, is a mosque located close to Derawar Fort in Yazman Tehsil, in the Cholistan Desert in Bahawalpur District, in the Punjab province of Pakistan. The mosque can accommodate 10,000 worshippers.

== History ==
Abbasi Mosque was built by Nawab Bahawal Khan in 1849. It was built like the Shah Jahani Masjid in Delhi, using the same construction materials.

== Architecture ==
Abbasi Mosque features a 4.9-metre-wide (16 ft), 39-metre-long (128 ft) prayer hall and is crowned by three bulbous marble domes that dominate the surrounding dunes. Two octagonal minarets flank a tri‑arched façade carved in low‑relief Qurʼanic calligraphy, while marble jharoka balconies evoke a late‑Mughal aesthetic.

Constructed entirely of polished marble, the building moderates desert heat and bathes its interior in diffused light that enters through pierced screens set high above the mihrab. The paved courtyard and prayer hall together can accommodate about ten thousand worshippers, a capacity that once enabled the Bahawalpur nawabs to conduct state ceremonies beneath its domes.

Historically, the main entrance housed servants' quarters and the lower portion comprised a hostel and a library.

== See also ==
- Islam in Pakistan
- List of mosques in Pakistan
