= Sahibzada Muzammil-ur-Rashid Abbasi =

Pakistani politician

Provincial Assembly of the Punjab
- In office 2002 – 2007
- Constituency: Bahawalpur District

Personal details
- Born: 25 June 1961 (age 65) Bahawalpur, Punjab, Pakistan
- Party: Pakistan Muslim League (Q)

Sahibzada Muzammil-ur-Rashid Abbasi (born 25 June 1961) is a Pakistani politician who was a member of the Provincial Assembly of the Punjab from 2002 to 2007. He is a member of the former ruling family of the Bahawalpur princely state.
