= 1909 New Year Honours =

Appointments by King Edward VII to various orders and honours

The New Year Honours 1909 were appointments by King Edward VII to various orders and honours to reward and highlight good works by members of the British Empire. They were announced on 5 January 1909.

By Special Statutes of the Order of the Star of India and the Order of the Indian Empire, dated 10 December 1908 and published in the same Gazette as the appointments, the King was empowered to appoint additional members to the second and third classes of those Orders (KCSI, CSI, KCIE and CIE) on 1 January 1909, in commemoration of the fiftieth anniversary of the assumption of the government of India by the Crown "without permanently increasing the number of the Ordinary Members of the Order." The members so appointed are indicated with a # in the list below.

== Order of the Star of India ==
=== Knight Grand Commander (GCSI) ===
- Prince and Duke Auguste Louis Albéric d'Arenberg, Member of the Institute of France, and President of the Suez Canal Company.(Honorary)
- His Highness Sir Rasul Khanji Mahabbat Khanji, K.C.S.I., Nawab of Junagarh.

=== Knight Commander (KCSI) ===
- John William Pitt Muir-Mackenzie, Esq., C.S.I., Indian Civil Service, an Ordinary Member of the Council of the Governor of Bombay.
- Nawab Bahadur Khwaia Salimulla, C.S.I., of Dacca, an Additional Member of the Council of the Governor-General for making Laws and Regulations.
- James Wilson, Esq., C.S.I., Indian Civil Service, Financial Commissioner, Punjab, and a Member of the Council of the Lieutenant-Governor of the Punjab for making Laws and Regulations.
- His Highness Maharaja Sawai Jai Singh, Bahadur, of Alwar. #
- Henry Erle Richards, Esq., K.C.. Barrister-at-law, an Ordinary Member of the Council of the Governor-General. #
- Gabriel Stokes, Esq., C.S.I., Indian Civil Service (retired), lately an Ordinary Member of the Council of the Governor of Fort St. George. #
- His Highness Farzand-i-Dilband Rasikh-ul-Itikad Daulat-i-Inglishia Raja-i-Rajagan Raja Ranbir Singh, Bahadur of Jind. #
- His Highness Maharana Shri Ajitsinghji Jaswatsinghji, Raj Sahib of Dhrangadhra. #

=== Companion (CSI) ===
- Spencer Harcourt Butler, Esq., C.I.E.. Indian Civil Service, Secretary to the Government of India in the Foreign Department.
- John Alexander Broun, Esq., Indian Civil Service, Commissioner of the Fyzabad Division, United Provinces of Agra and Oudh.
- William Thomson Morison, Esq., Indian Civil Service, lately President, Factory Labour Commission, and at present Commissioner Central Division, Poona.
- Lieutenant-Colonel James Robert Dunlop-Smith, C.I.E., Indian Army, Private Secretary to the Viceroy and Governor-General of India.
- Colonel Henry Finnis, Royal Engineers, Commanding Royal Engineers, 4th (Quetta) Division. Military Works Services, and Secretary for Civil Works in Baluchistan, to the Agent to the Governor-General.
- Maharaj Bhairon Singh, Senior Member of the Council and Secretary for the Political and Foreign Department. Bikaner State.
- Major-General Alfred William Lambart Bayly, C.B., D.S.O., Indian Army, Secretary to the Government of India in the Army Department. #
- Maurice Walter Fox-Strangways, Esq., Indian Civil Service, Commissioner of the Jubbulpore Division, Central Provinces. #
- William Lochiel Sapte Lovett Cameron, Esq., Chief Engineer and Secretary to the Government of Bombay Public Works Department, and an Additional Member of the Council of the Governor of Bombay for making Laws and Regulations. #
- Sardar Partab Singh, Ahluwalia, a Member of the Council of the Lieutenant-Governor of the Punjab for making Laws and Regulations. #
- Edward Douglas Maclagan, Esq., Indian Civil Service, Chief Secretary to the Government of the Punjab, and a Member of the Council of the Lieutenant-Governor of the Punjab for making Laws and Regulations. #
- Munshi Madho Lai, lately an Additional Member of the Council of the Governor-General for making Laws and Regulations. #
- Henry Paul Todd-Naylor, Esq., C.I.E., Indian Civil Service, Commissioner of the Mandalay Division, Burma. #
- John Stratheden Campbell, Esq., C.I.E., Indian Civil Service, Commissioner of the Kumaon Division, and lately Famine Commissioner, United Provinces of Agra and Oudh. #
- Lieutenant-Colonel Charles Herbert, Indian Army, Resident at Jaipur. #
- Diwan Bahadur Rabgundai Raghunatha Ruo, late Diwan of Indore. #

== Order of the Indian Empire ==
=== Knight Commander (KCIE) ===
- His Highness Maharaj-Dhiraj Madan Singh Bahadur of Kishangarh (Rajputana). #
- His Highness Rais-ud-Daula Sipahdar-ul-Mulk Maharaja Dhiraj Sri Sawai Maharaj Rana Ram Singh Lokindar Bahadur Diler Jang Jai Deo of Dholpur. #
- Raja Mohammad Ali Mohammad Khan, Khan Bahadur, of Mahmudabad, an Additional Member of the Council of the Governor-General for making Laws and Regulations. #
- Trevredyn Rashleigh Wynne, Esq., C.I.E., President, Railway Board. #
- Surgeon-General Gerald Bomford, C.I.E., M.D., Indian Medical Service, Director-General, Indian Medical Service. #
- Richard Morris Dene, Esq., C.I.E., Indian Civil Service, Inspector-General of Excise and Salt in India. #
- Maharaja-Dhiraj Bijay Chand Mahtab Bahadur of Burdwan, a Member of the Council of the Lieutenant-Governor of Bengal for making Laws and Regulations. #
- Raja Baldeo Singh of Poonch. #
- Nawab Hafiz Muhammad Abdulla Khan, Alizai, C.I.E., Honorary Native Commandant, 15th Lancers. #
- Prince Ghulain Muhammad Ali, Khan Bahadur, of Arcot. #

=== Companion (CIE) ===
- Maung Bah Too, retired Extra Assistant Commissioner, Burma, and at present an Additional Member of the Council of the Governor General for making Laws and Regulations.
- Colonel Ernest William Stuart King Maconchy, D.S.O., Indian Army, Secretary to the Government of India in the Department of Military Supply.
- William Maxwell, Esq., Indian Civil Service, Officiating Director-General of the Post Office in India, and lately Officiating Secretary to the Government of India in the Finance Department.
- Archdale Earle, Esq., Indian Civil Service, lately Director of Public Instruction, Bengal, and at present Commissioner of the Patna Division, Bengal.
- William Ellis Jardine, Esq., Indian Civil Service, Political Agent in Bundelkhand.
- Lieutenant-Colonel John Tasman Waddell Leslie, M.B., Indian Medical Service, Sanitary Commissioner with the Government of India.
- Thomas Corby Wilson, Esq., Indian Civil Service (retired), lately Commissioner of Settlements and Land Records in Burma.
- Lieutenant-Colonel Alfred Horsford Bingley, Indian Army, Deputy Secretary to the Government of India in the Army Department (on special duty). #
- Frederick Loch Halliday, Esq., M.V.O., Commissioner of Police, Calcutta. #
- Lieutenant-Colonel Charles Thorp Jessop, V.D., Honorary Aide-de-Camp to the Lieutenant-Governor of Eastern Bengal and Assam, and Commandant of the Assam Valley Light Horse. #
- Percy Wyndham, Esq., Indian Civil Service, Magistrate and Collector of Mirzapur, United Provinces. #
- Hugh Spencer, Esq., Indian Civil Service, Magistrate and Collector of Bahraich, United Provinces. #
- Charles Ernest Low, Esq., Indian Civil Service, Deputy Commissioner in the Central Provinces. #
- William Arthur Dring, Esq., Agent, East Indian Railway. #
- Major Keith David Erskine, Indian Army, Political Agent in Bikaner. #
- Cecil Ward Chichele-Plowden, Esq., Deputy Inspector-General of Police, Calcutta. #
- William King-Wood, Esq., Officiating Director, Persian Section of the Indo-European Telegraph Department. #
- Major Richmond Trevor Crichton, Indian Army, on special duty, Provincial Surveys, Bengal. #
- Major Walter Hood Orr, Indian Medical Service, Civil Surgeon of the Bahraich District, United Provinces. #
- Khun Lai, Sawbwa of the Shan State of Laihka. #
- Albert Claude Verrieres, Esq., Executive Engineer of the Agra Division. #
- Raja Ram Singh of Rampura, in the Jalaun District, United Provinces. #
- Diwan Bahadur P. Rajagopala Chariar Avergal, Diwan of Travancore. #
- Maulvi Rahim Baksh, President, Council of Regency, Bahawalpur State. #
- Rao Bahadur Sansar Chandar Sen, M.V.O., Senior Member of the Jaipur State Council. #
- Munshi Aziz-ud-Din, M.V.O., Assistant Director, Criminal Intelligence. #
- Babu Nilambar Mukharji, Vice-Chairman of the Corporation of Calcutta. #
- Khan Bahadur Fakir Saiyid Kamr-ud-Din of Lahore. #
- Rajendra Nath Mukherji, Esq., Partner of Messrs. Martin & Co., Calcutta. #
- Alfred Thomas Whittle, Esq., of Gujerat and Kathiawar. #
- Rai Bahadur Kali Prasanna Ghosh of Dacca. #
