= James Wilson (civil servant) =

Sir James Wilson KCSI
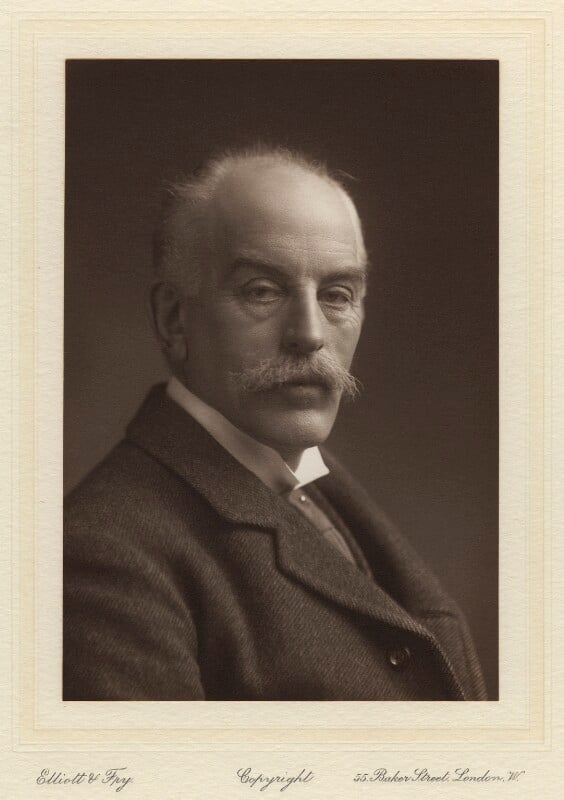
- Born: 27 February 1853
- Died: 22 September 1926 (aged 73); Crieff, Scotland
- Occupations: Civil servant in British India and the United Kingdom
- Spouse: Anne Campbell Macleod

Sir James Wilson, KCSI (27 February 1853 – 22 September 1926) was a British civil servant in British India, where he spent most of his career in the Punjab. After his return to the United Kingdom he was a senior civil servant under the Board of Agriculture and Fisheries, representing the country at the International Institute of Agriculture. He was also an author of books on dialects and folklore, in India and in Scotland.

== Career ==
Wilson was born in 1853, the son of Rev. John Wilson, DD, minister and historian of Dunning, Perthshire. He was educated at Perth Academy, the University of Edinburgh and at Balliol College, Oxford.

He entered the Indian Civil Service in 1873, and arrived in India in November 1875 to take up the position of assistant commissioner and settlement officer in Punjab Province, where he stayed for most of his career in India. He officiated as under secretary to the government of Punjab in 1881 and 1884, and as senior financial secretary to the financial commissioned in 1885 and 1886. Appointed deputy commissioner in September 1890, he served as settlement commissioner from November 1899. He was from 1903 to 1908 Secretary to the Government of India in the Department of Revenue and Agriculture (having officiated as such earlier), and in early 1908 took second place to the lieutenant-governor in his old province, when he was appointed Financial Commissioner of the Punjab. It was in this post that he conceived the idea of the Triple Canal Irrigation project, which he lived to see adding enormously to the economic wealth of the province. He retired from the Indian Civil Service in late 1910.

In January 1900 he was appointed a Member of the Council of the Lieutenant-Governor of the Punjab, staying as such until 1910.

Following his return to the United Kingdom, he was Superintending Inspector under the Board of Agriculture and Fisheries from 1911 until 1915, and served as the permanent delegate for the United Kingdom, Ireland, Canada, Australia, New Zealand and South Africa to the International Institute of Agriculture in Rome from 1914 until 1917. He regularly communicated statistics on cereal crops in the world to The Times. He was a governor of the Agricultural Organisation Society 1912–1914, and a chairman of the Central Agricultural Wages Committee for Scotland from 1917 until 1921.

Wilson was appointed a Companion of the Order of the Star of India (CSI) in the 1901 Birthday Honours list on 9 November 1901, for work against famine in Punjab; and promoted to a Knight Commander (KCSI) in the Order in the 1909 New Year Honours.

He died at his residence, Annieslea, Crieff on 22 December 1926.

== Publications ==
Wilson had an interest for dialects and folklore, and published several books while in India, including Code of Tribal Custom in Shahpur and in Sirsa and Grammar of Western Punjabi. He also published the more official Gazetteer of Shahpur District and Settlement Report of Sirsa District.

He continued writing after his return to the United Kingdom, writing books on Lowland Scotch as spoken in the Lower Strathearn district of Perthshire (1915), Farm-workers in Scotland, The Dialect of Robert Burns, Scottish Poems of Robert Burns, and Dialects of Central Scotland.

He was also an active correspondent in The Times.

== Family ==
Wilson married, in 1888, Anne Campbell Macleod, daughter of Rev Norman Macleod. Lady Wilson was herself a noted author, publishing two books based on letters to friends and family during her time in India. She also paid special attention to Indian music while in the country. She died at Crieff on 13 April 1921. They had children, including a son who died in the First World War.
