= Nawab Salahuddin Abbasi =

Pakistani politician

Salahuddin Ahmed Abbasi
- Nawab of Bahawalpur
- Tenure: 14 April 1988 – Present
- Predecessor: Nawab Muhammad Abbas Khan Abbasi Bahadur
- Native name: صلاح الدین عباسی
- Other titles: Amir of Abbasi Dynasty, Head of Bahawalpur National Awami Party
- Born: 27 July 1946 (age 80); Al-Hilal Palace, Punjab, British Raj
- Residence: Sadiq Garh Palace, Ahmadpur East, Pakistan
- Locality: Punjab
- Offices: Member of the National Assembly of Pakistan
- Spouse: Moniba Abbasi
- Issue: Aneeza Abbasi; Bahawal Abbas Abbasi
- Heir: Bahawal Abbas Abbasi
- Father: Muhammad Abbas Khan Abbasi
- Mother: Shamsa Parveen Abbasi
- Occupation: Politician
- Education: Aitchison College; University of London

Nawab Salahuddin Ahmed Abbasi (Urdu: نواب صلاح الدین عباسی) is a Member of Parliament in Pakistan, who is also the grandson of Sadiq Mohammad Khan V, who was the last ruling Nawab of the Princely State Bahawalpur. He has been elected five times as Member of National Assembly from the city Ahmadpur East. He is also the Chief of Bahawalpur National Awami Party (BNAP) which was allied with Imran Khan's Pakistan Tehreek-i-Insaf.

Nawab Salahuddin Abbasi is a strong campaigner of restoration of Bahawalpur province and an influential personality of South Punjab.

== Early life, education, and family ==
Salahuddin was born on 27 July 1946 at Al-Hilal Palace to Muhammad Abbas Khan Abbasi and his wife Shamsa Parveen Abbasi. He received his education at Aitchison College and the University of London. He married Moniba Abbasi in 1965. The two have together two children: a daughter, Aneeza Abbasi, and a son, Bahawal Abbas Abbasi.

== Public life ==
He was appointed as the heir apparent, on the death of his grandfather, 24 May 1966. Succeeded on the death of his father on 14 April 1988 as head of the Royal House of Bahawalpur and was recognized as "Amir of Bahawalpur" by the Government of Pakistan.

He is also the Patron of National Red Crescent Society since 1975. Patron-in-Chief of Pakistan Social Association, Anjuman Ashait-e-Seerat-un-Nabi (Bahawalpur), and Pakistan Minorities Social Welfare Organization. President of Markazi Seerat Committee 1976, and Bahawalpur Divisional Rover Scouts. Chairman of Sir Sadiq Mohd Khan Trust. Founder Director of Foundation for Advancement of Engineering Sciences & Advanced Technologies since 2001. Member of National Seerat Committee 1976, Chancellor's Committee of Islamia Univ of Bahawalpur, Governing Body of Sadiq Public School, Punjab Welfare Board, Punjab Council on Social Welfare, etc.

== Privilege ==
Nawab maintains the royal title of Nawab, a diplomatic car number plate and a diplomatic passport in Pakistan. According to Dawn, he also enjoys a very respected status in the Bahawalpur region.

== Politics ==
Nawab has remained member of the National Assembly repeatedly from the city Ahmadpur East as an independent candidate, In 2008 elections all of the Nawab backed candidates won from Bahawalpur, Bahawalnagar and Rahim Yar Khan thus Nawab is said to have significant influence in the region. In 2012 Nawab formed his own political party Bahawalpur National Awami Party (BNAP) which in 2013 allied with Imran Khan led Pakistan Tehreek-e-Insaf (PTI) for 2013 elections. Now BNAP is not allied with PTI.

== See also ==
- Nawab Sadiq Mohammad Khan V Abbasi
- Imran Khan
- Pakistan Tehreek-i-Insaf
