= Richard Marsh Crofton =

British Indian colonial administrator (1891–1955)

Sir Richard Marsh Crofton, CIE

1st Prime Minister of Bahawalpur
- In office 1942–1947
- Preceded by: Position established
- Succeeded by: Sir John Dring

Personal details
- Born: 6 April 1891 Liskeard, Cornwall, England
- Died: 27 May 1955 (aged 64) Minstead, Hampshire, England

Sir Richard Marsh Crofton CIE (6 April 1891 – 27 May 1955) was an Indian Civil Service and British Indian Army officer who served as 1st Prime Minister of Bahawalpur between 1942 and 1947. He was knighted in the 1945 Birthday Honours.

He died in 1955.
