= Bahawal Khan V =

- Rukn-ud-Daula; Hafiz-ul-Mulk; Mukhlis-ud-Daula wa Muin-ud-Daula; Nusrat Jung
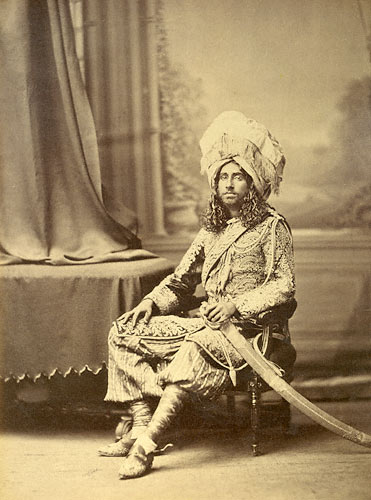
- Bahawal Khan V

13th Nawab of Bahawalpur
- Reign: 14 February 1899 – 15 February 1907
- Coronation: 10 March 1899
- Investiture: 12 November 1903
- Predecessor: Sadiq Mohammad Khan IV
- Successor: Sadiq Muhammad Khan Abbasi V
- Born: Bahawal Khan; 23 October 1883; Derawar Fort, Bahawalpur, British India (present-day Punjab, Pakistan)
- Died: 15 February 1907 (aged 23); At sea near Aden
- Burial: Royal Graveyard, Derawar Fort
- Issue: Sadiq Muhammad Khan Abbasi V
- Muhammad Bahawal Khan V; محمد بہاول خان پنجم
- House: Bahawalpur
- Dynasty: Daudpotra
- Father: Sadiq Mohammad Khan IV
- Education: University of the Punjab; Aitchison College

Muhammad Bahawal Khan V (23 October 1883 – 15 February 1907) was Nawab of Bahawalpur from 14 February 1899 until his death in 1907.

== Early life, family, and education ==
Khan was born on 23 October 1883 to Sadiq Mohammad Khan IV. He was educated first under the care of a private tutor by the name of Arthur Evill, and in 1897 was sent to Aitchison College in Lahore, where he was admitted to fourth class. While at Aitchison, he completed in three years a course of studies that was meant to be completed in five years, and passed his middle school standard examination in 1900. Then in 1901, he passed the entrance examination of the University of the Punjab. After completing his education, he returned to his state and there underwent a course of training in administrative affairs. On 11 July 1901, he married a daughter of his grand-uncle Mahabhat Khan. By her, he had issues, including a son, Sadiq Muhammad Khan Abbasi V.

== Reign ==
Upon the death of his father on 14 February 1899, he immediately succeeded to his title, rank and dignity as the Nawab of Bahawalpur, and his succession was also recognised by the Government of India. His dastar bandi, or turban-tying ceremony, was performed on 10 March 1899. On the occasion, he took, per his family custom, the name of Muhammad Bahawal Khan V, after his grandfather. But, owing to his minority, a council of administration was formed to administer affairs of the state until he came of age. Of this council, L.G.H. Grey was made superintendent for the period of three years. During his minority, the state's revenue increased to Rs. 24,00,000. Khan was among the five original Indian potentes who were invited in 1902 to England to attend the coronation of Edward VII and his wife, Alexandra, as king and queen of the United Kingdom and the British Dominions at Westminster Abbey in London. To attend the coronation, he travelled out of his state to Karachi, and then to Mumbai to board a ship for Europe. But he got severely ill, so he had to cancel his trip and return to his state. While in his state, he had, on the day of the coronation, organised a series of programmes to celebrate the occasion.

He was invested with full administrative powers by Lord Curzon, in his capacity as the Viceroy and Governor-General of India, on 12 November 1903. On that day, Khan received Lord Curzon at the state's railway station, accompanied by Charles Montgomery Rivaz, the then Lieutenant-Governor of the Punjab, his principal nobles and a large number of civil and military officers. He then drove with Lord Curzon to the Noor Mahal, where a special durbar was held at 4:00 PM to held his investiture. After that, until the time of his death, he proved himself to be a very capable and energetic ruler. He attended the Delhi Durbar of 1902.

== Death ==
In November 1906, Khan left his state to go to Mecca for pilgrimage, and on arriving at Jeddah, he was taken ill with diarrhoea and fever. Although he was able to complete his religious obligations, his health worsened. When he reached Aden, Colonel Monk of the Indian Medical Service came to examine his health and diagnosed that Khan was suffering from pneumonia. Following which, Khan's ship left Aden, and he died at sea on 15 February 1907. His son, Sadiq Muhammad Khan Abbasi V, succeeded to his title, rank and dignity.

Bahawal Khan V Daudpotra
Regnal titles
| Preceded by SadIq Mohammad Khan IV | Nawab of Bahawalpur; 1899–1907 | Succeeded by Sadiq Muhammad Khan Abbasi V |
