= Daudpotra =

Muslim clan found in Pakistan

Daudpotra (alternatively Daudpota or Daudputra; lit. 'Sons of Daud') is a Muslim clan from Sindh, found in south Punjab and north-western Sindh provinces of Pakistan. The Nawabs of Bahawalpur belonged to this clan.

== History ==
The Daudpotras were considered a powerful tribe in the 17th century lower Sindh. They are closely related to the Kalhora tribe, with both claiming descent from Abbas ibn Abd al-Muttalib, a paternal uncle and sahabi (companion) of the Islamic prophet Muhammad. André Wink considers their progenitor, Daud, to be a Julaha from Jat community. The city of Shikarpur in Sindh was founded in 1617 CE by the Daudpotras after a battle with Mahars and they remained the jagirdars and later rulers of Shikarpur for almost 128 years with breaks in between. Their rule was contested by their cousins, the Kalhoras. In 1739, Nader Shah reinstated Daudpotras rule in Sehwan and Shikarpur. In 1747, their rule in Shikarpur ended and during the absence of Sadiq Khan (Note: The last ruler of Shikarpur.) from Shikarpur, he laid the foundations of a new state with support from the Nawab of Multan and the Sheikh of Uch. The Daudpotras were granted jagirs by them in the areas that later formed the Bahawalpur state, established by Bahawal Khan, the son of Sadiq Khan. After the death of his father he renounced all claims on Shikarpur.

== Notable people with surname ==
- Umar Bin Muhammad Daudpota
- Azim Daudpota
