= Derawar Fort =

Fortress in Bahawalpur district, Pakistan

- قلعہ دراوڑ (Punjabi)
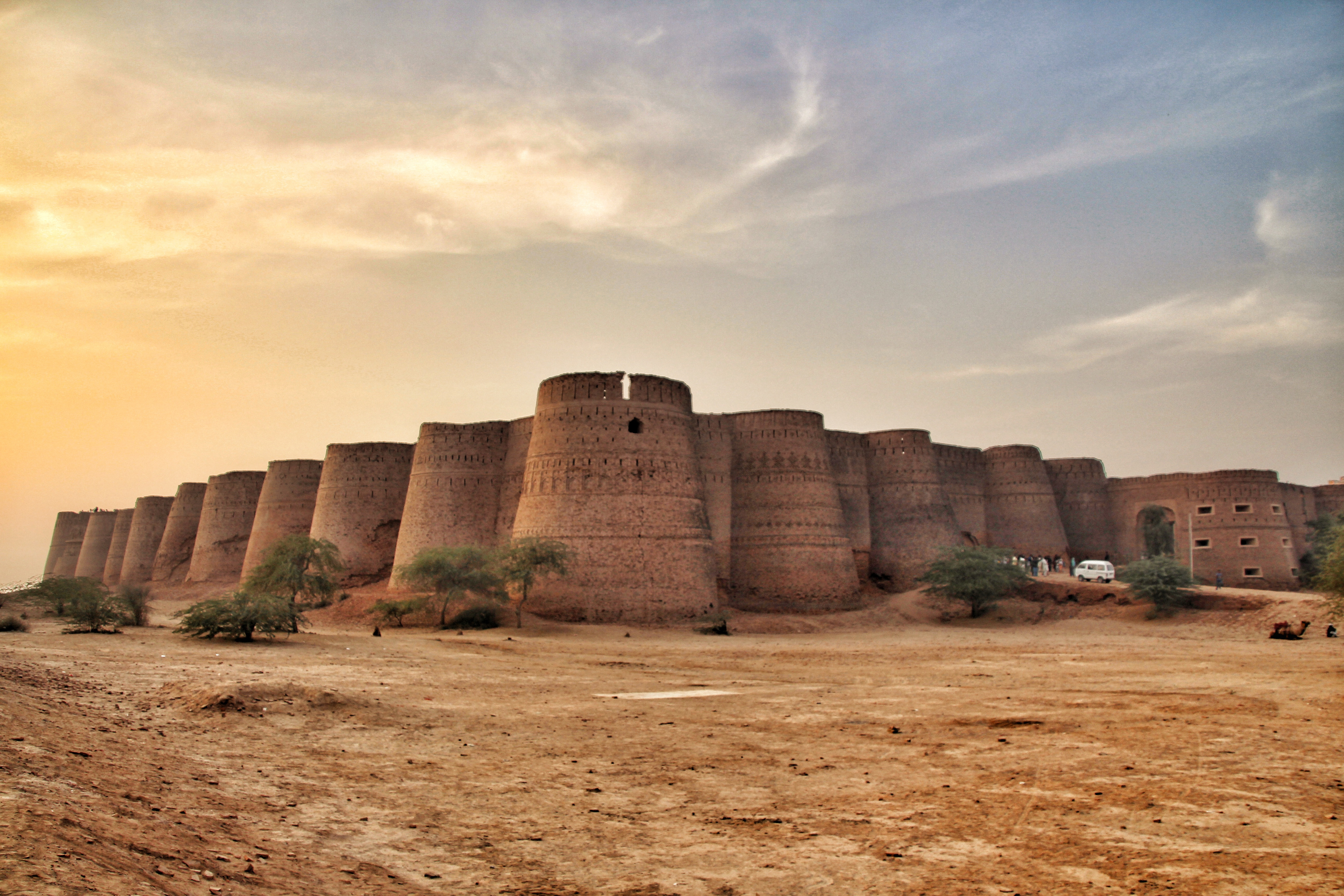
- Derawar Fort was originally founded as a Bhati fort in the 9th century CE, and renovated in 1732 by Nawab Sadeq Mohammad Khan
- Interactive map of Derawar Fort
- 28°46′5″N 71°20′3″E
- Type: Fortress
- Location: Yazman Tehsil, Bahawalpur, Punjab, Pakistan

History
- Built: 858

Site notes
- Architectural style: Rajput architecture
- Governing body: Government of Pakistan

Derawar Fort (Note: Punjabi, Urdu: قلعہ دراوڑ, romanized: Dērāwār qilā) is a fortress located in the Cholistan Desert of Punjab, Pakistan, specifically within the Yazman Tehsil of the Bahawalpur District. Approximately 20 km south of the city of Ahmedpur East, the forty bastions of Derawar are visible from many miles in the Cholistan. The walls have a perimeter of 1500 metres and stand up to thirty metres high.

== History ==
The Cholistan Desert comprises the western region of the Thar Desert in modern Pakistan, where archaeological evidence is present that the area was once inhabited by an Indus Valley culture. This culture once used the Hakra River to support their agricultural lifestyle. In around 600 BC, the river had changed course which caused it to essentially disappear into the ground. Due to this shift in the river, the area became an arid desert no longer suitable for human habitation. There are still evidence of ruins of up to a dozen fort structures in the region. Derawar Fort is the best surviving structure of the remaining ruins.

Even though the land could no longer support a settlement, it still was able to become an important part of the trade route that had connected Central Asia to the Indian subcontinent. It also became a pilgrimage route for those traveling to Mecca, the holy Islamic city from India or vice versa.

Derawar fort was built in 858 under the rule of Rai Jajja Bhati, a Hindu Rajput ruler of the Bhati clan, as a tribute to Rawal Deoraj Bhati, ruler of the Kingdom of Jaisalmer who had his capital at Lodhruva. The fort was initially known as Dera Rawal, and later referred to as Dera Rawar, which with the passage of time came to be pronounced Derawar, its present name. Meergarh, Jaangarh, Marotgarh, Maujgarh, Dingarh, Khangarh, Khairgarh, Bijnotgarh and Islamgarh are all forts that spanned across the desert creating a chain of forts that were all meant to provide shelter for travelers. Out of all of these forts, Derawar is considered the best surviving example.

In the 18th century, the fort was taken over by Muslim Nawabs of Bahawalpur from the Shahotra tribe. It was later renovated in its current form in 1732 by the Abbasi ruler Nawab Sadeq Muhammad, but in 1747 the fort slipped from their hands owing to Bahawal Khan's preoccupations at Shikarpur. Nawab Mubarak Khan took the stronghold back in 1804. 1,000 year-old catapult shells were found in the debris near a decaying wall in the fort. The fort survived for as long as it did solely because of the consistent population that remained there. Many other buildings of the medieval desert fell as they did not have a population to maintain them.

Nawab Sadeq Muhammad Khan Abbasi V, the 12th and last ruler of Bahawalpur state, was born in the fort in 1904.

Derawar Fort was eventually taken over by the British and was used to house prisoners, as well as hang unlucky inmates.

During the period around the 1965 war with India, several structures inside the fort were taken down to make room for training.

Google Doodle made a doodle of Derawar Fort to celebrate Pakistan's 75 Independence Day. According to Google, the fort symbolizes Pakistani adaptability and antiquity.

== Structure ==
The fort is a massive and visually stunning square structure built of clay bricks. The walls have a length of 1500 meters and stand up to thirty meters high. There are forty circular bastions, ten on each side, which stand 30 m high and are visible across the desert for many miles. Each bastion is intricately decorated with patterns cut into the brick. The interior provides evidence of structures decorated with tile and fresco artwork. The current fort covers around 35 acres of land.

There is an underground passageway that could take the emperor all the way from his castle to the fort. There are still underground lodgings there, however, many sections have deteriorated. This area does has a passive ventilation system that keeps the underground palace very cool.

Derawar is just one example of the wide variety of forms derived from square brick. These particular forms date back to between the 16th and 18th centuries, though some renovations date as early as the 9th century.

The Moti or Pearl Mosque and the cemetery of the Nawabs are both nearby and boast very decretive graves. the Abbasi Mosque is also nearby and was constructed in 1849 for Nawab's personal religious man, Pir Ghulam Farid. Just a short distance to the east of the fort lies mausoleums of the Nawabs and their families. There is also an ornate domed marble mausoleum for the last nawab's English wife.

== Renovation ==
The Fort was later renovated in its current form in 1732 by the Abbasi ruler Nawab Sadeq Muhammad. In 2019 the provincial government has earmarked a sum of Rs46 million to resume the conservation of Derawar Fort, an iconic edifice located in Cholistan desert near Bahawalpur. The major work has been completed including conservation of a food grain warehouse outside the fort, underpinning of damaged parts on the front and south-eastern sides of the fort's bastion, walls and platform, underpinning of the north-eastern side of the bastion and the walls, the interior of the fort and the sloped flooring leading to baradari and walls adjacent to the main gate.

Despite renovation, the site faces extreme deterioration and neglect. Though the outside structure serves as an important example of history and landscape, the interior is falling apart due to severe weather conditions and disrespectful visitors and tourists. The woodwork is almost completely gone, along with the interior floor deteriorating to shambles.

== UNESCO tentative list ==
Derawar and the Desert Forts of Cholistan was submitted by the Pakistan Government in 2016 to be considered as a World Heritage Site. The structures are reminiscent of ancient stops during trading routes in a desert largely lacking water. Derawar especially allowed access to water, while providing defense and shelter. The site is important due to its role in identifying political and social factors relating to Afghanistan, Pakistan, and India trading routes.

Derawar is being considered under criterion (iii) which has to do with providing an important example of infrastructure designed to meet the environmental circumstances of the hostile desert while providing insight into ancient trade and culture, as well criterion (v) that claims Derawar is an exceptional example of the interaction of architecture with the limited environmental resources.

== Images ==
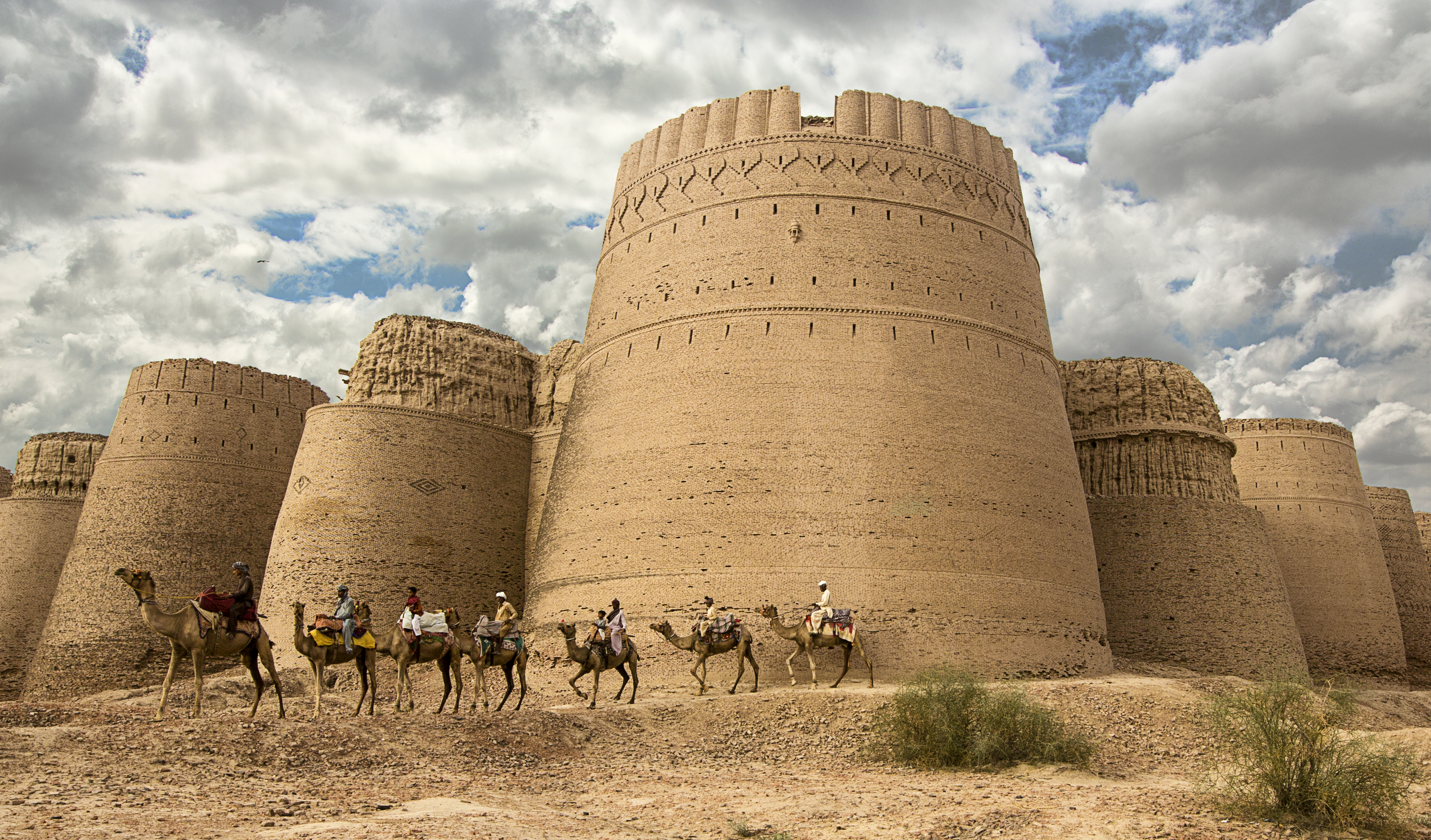

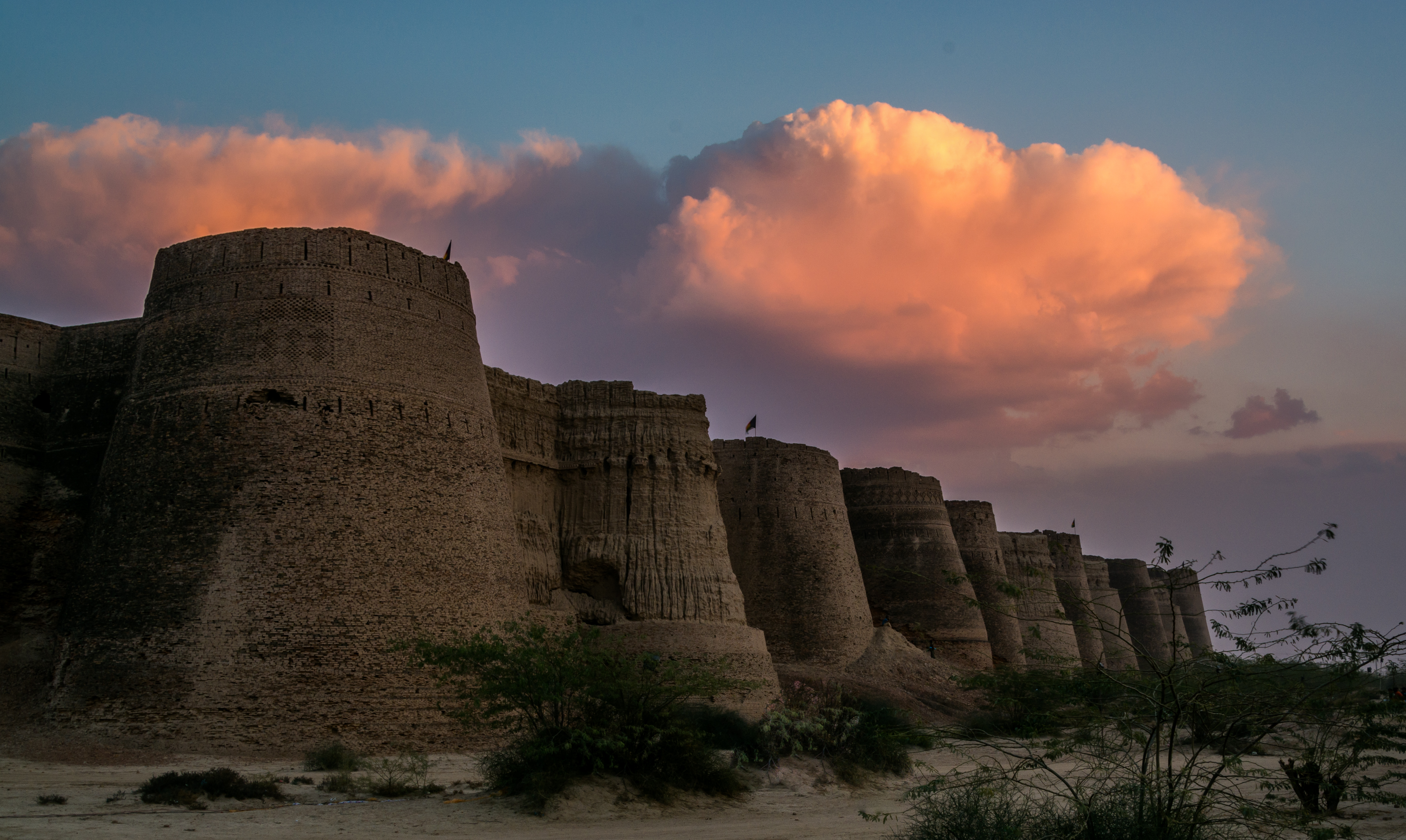

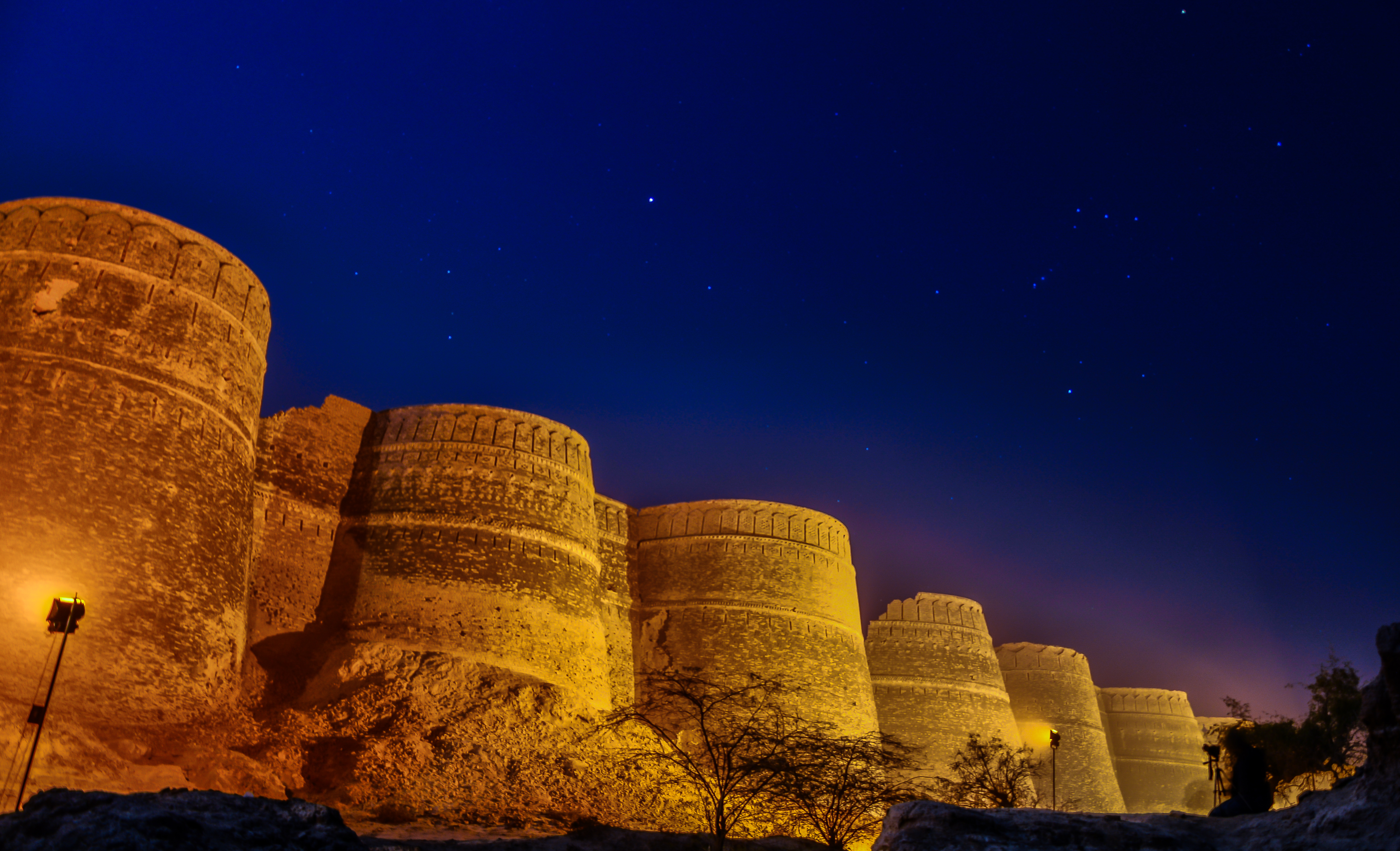

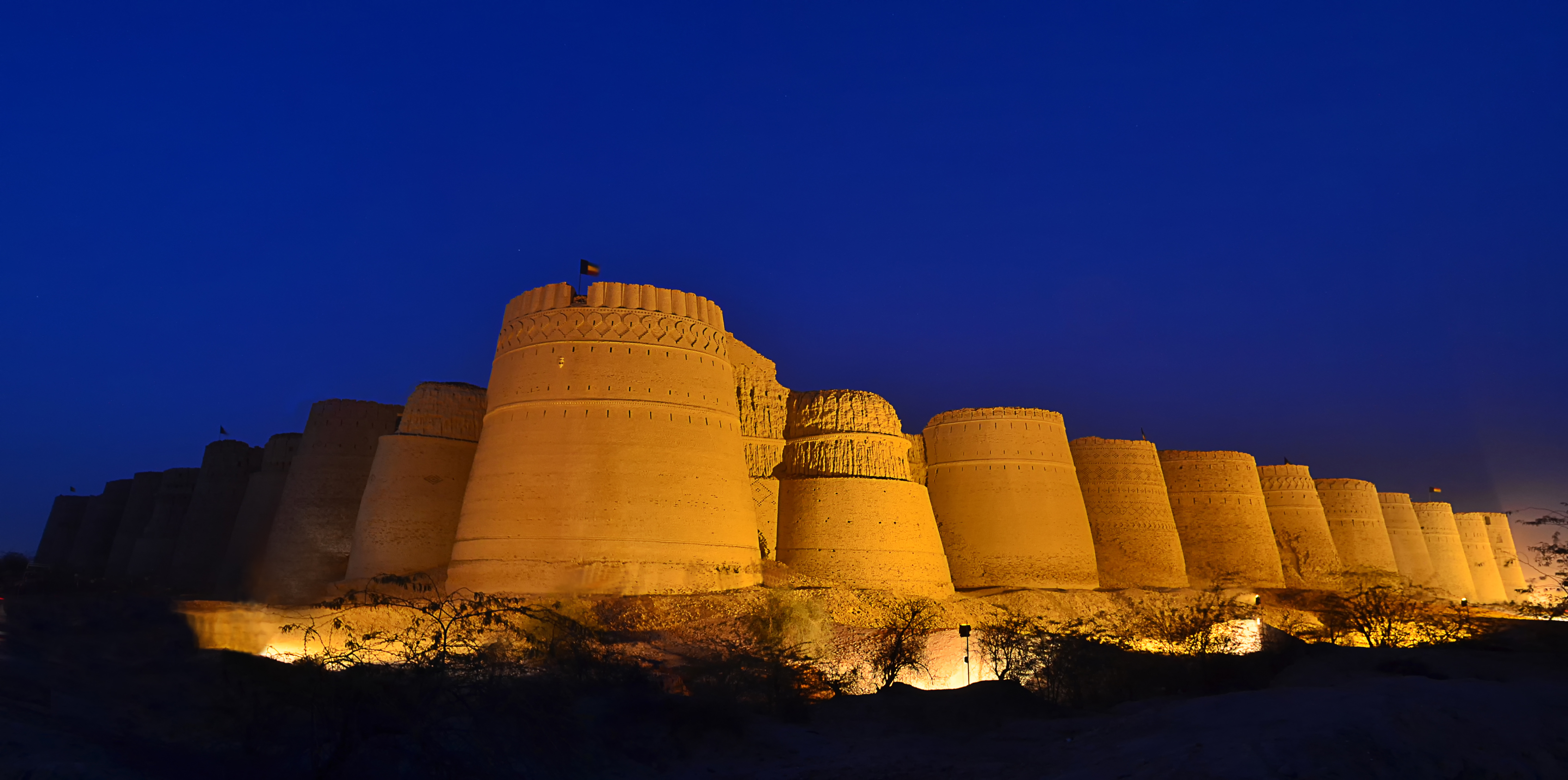

== See also ==
- List of UNESCO World Heritage Sites in Pakistan
- List of forts in Pakistan
- List of museums in Pakistan
