= Sadiq Muhammad Khan Abbasi V =

Amir of Bahawalpur (1904–1966)

Sadiq Mohammad Khan Abbasi V
- Nawab; Amir
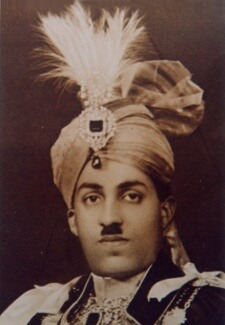
- Official Portrait of the Nawab

14th Nawab of Bahawalpur
- Reign: 15 February 1907 – 14 October 1955
- Predecessor: Mohammad Bahawal Khan V
- Successor: Abbas Abbasi
- Born: 29 September 1904; Derawar Fort, Bahawalpur, Punjab, British India (present-day Punjab, Pakistan)
- Died: 24 May 1966 (aged 61); London, United Kingdom
- Burial: The Abbasi Royal Graveyard, Derawar Fort, Bahawalpur, Punjab, Pakistan
- Spouse: Linda Sayce, Begum of Bahawalpur (last wife, mother of his 3 sons)
- House: Daudputra dynasty
- Father: Bahawal Khan V
- Religion: Islam

Nawab Sir Sadiq Mohammad Khan V Abbasi (Urdu: جنرل نواب صادق محمد خان عباسی; 29 September 1904 – 24 May 1966) was the 14th and final Nawab (ruler) of the state of Bahawalpur from February 1907 to October 1955, and then as a titular figure until his death in 1966.

He became the Nawab on the death of his father when he was only two years old. A Council of Regency, with Sir Rahim Bakhsh as its president, ruled on his behalf until 1924.

The Nawab served as an officer with the British Indian Army, fighting in the Third Afghan War (1919) and commanding forces in the Middle East during the Second World War. By 1947, Bahawalpur state's institutions consisted of departments run by trained civil servants; there was a Ministerial Cabinet headed by a prime minister; the State Bank was the Bank of Bahawalpur, with branches outside the State, including in Karachi, and Lahore. There was a High Court, lower courts, as well as a trained police force and an army commanded by officers trained at the Royal Indian Military Academy at Dehra Doon. The Nawab had a keen interest in education, which was free till A level and the state's government provided scholarships of merit for higher education. In 1951, the Nawab donated 500 acres in Bahawalpur for the construction of Sadiq Public School. The Nawab was known for his close ties with the Quaid-i-Azam (Muhammad Ali Jinnah), the founder of Pakistan.

In August 1947, on the withdrawal of British forces from the British India, the Nawab decided not to accede his State at once to the new Dominion of Pakistan. However, on 3 October 1947, after some delay, he relented and became the first ruler of a princely state (Bahawalpur) to accede successfully.

As tens of thousands of Muslim refugees flooded into the state from the new India, he set up the Ameer of Bahawalpur Refugee Relief and Rehabilitation Fund to provide for their relief. In 1953, the Ameer represented Pakistan at the coronation of Queen Elizabeth II. In 1955, he signed an agreement with the governor-general of Pakistan, Malik Ghulam Muhammad, under which Bahawalpur became part of the province of West Pakistan, with effect from 14 October 1955, and the Amir received a yearly privy purse of 32 lakhs of rupees, keeping his titles. The same year, he was promoted to the rank of general in the Pakistan Army.

== Early life ==
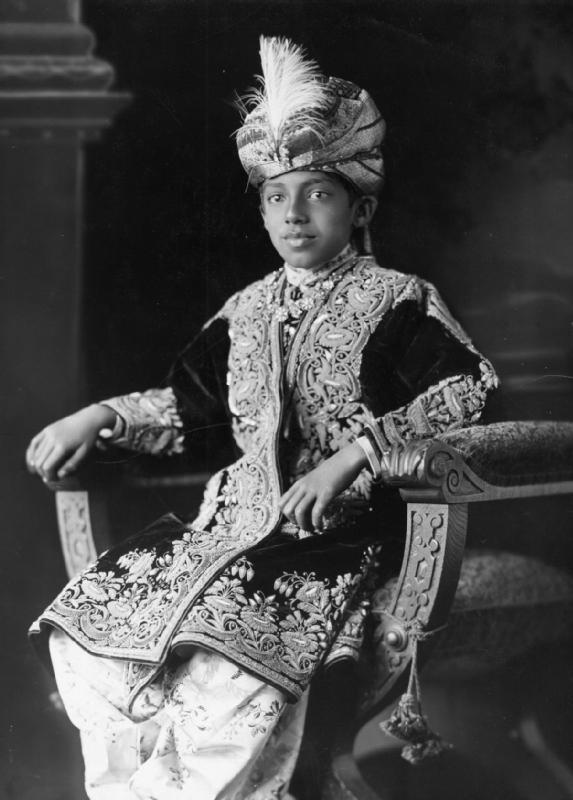
Sadeq aged 15

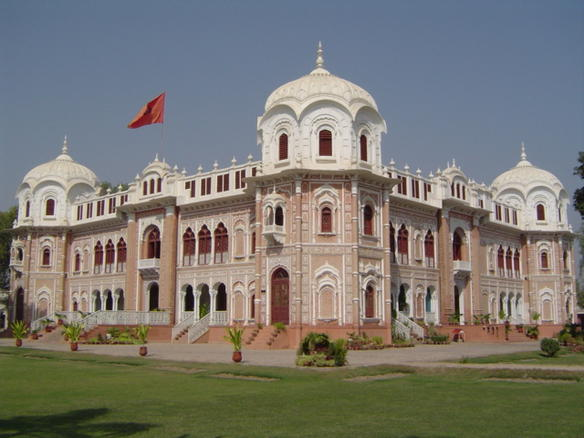
Darbar Mahal, was the primary palace of the Nawab

Abbasi was born at Derawar on 29 September 1904 as the only son and heir of Bahawal Khan V, the Nawab of Bahawalpur. He visited Mecca with his father in 1906–07. He was educated at Aitchison College, Lahore, and was placed under the guardianship of E. M. Atkinson. At the age of 15, Sadiq fought in the Third Afghan War in 1919, was knighted in 1922 when he reached his majority and was invested with the throne two years later by the Viceroy of India, Rufus Isaacs, Lord Reading.

In 1929, he visited Egypt and was a guest of King Fuad I. Very fond of cars, he bought a Rolls-Royce Phantom, 45WR, bodied by Thrupp & Maberly, one of the two cars on display at the Cairo Show.

His last wife was Linda Sayce, a British citizen. The couple had three sons.

== Reign ==
When his father died on 15 February 1907 near Aden, on his return journey to Bahawalpur from a pilgrimage to Mecca, he succeeded him as the Nawab of Bahawalpur. As he was a minor on the occasion, the administration of the State was placed under a Council of Regency. It comprised Indian officials, with the following members: the President, Rahim Baksh; Khuda Baksh Khan (Revenue Member); Diwan Asa Nand (Financial Member); and Abdul Rahman Khan (Military Member). In 1913, he sailed for England with Charles H. Atkins, formerly Political Agent in the Punjab, travelling via Egypt, Italy, and France. During his stay in London, he was received by George V at Buckingham Palace. He attended the Delhi Durbar of 1911. He served as aide-de-camp to the Prince of Wales during his visit to India in 1921.

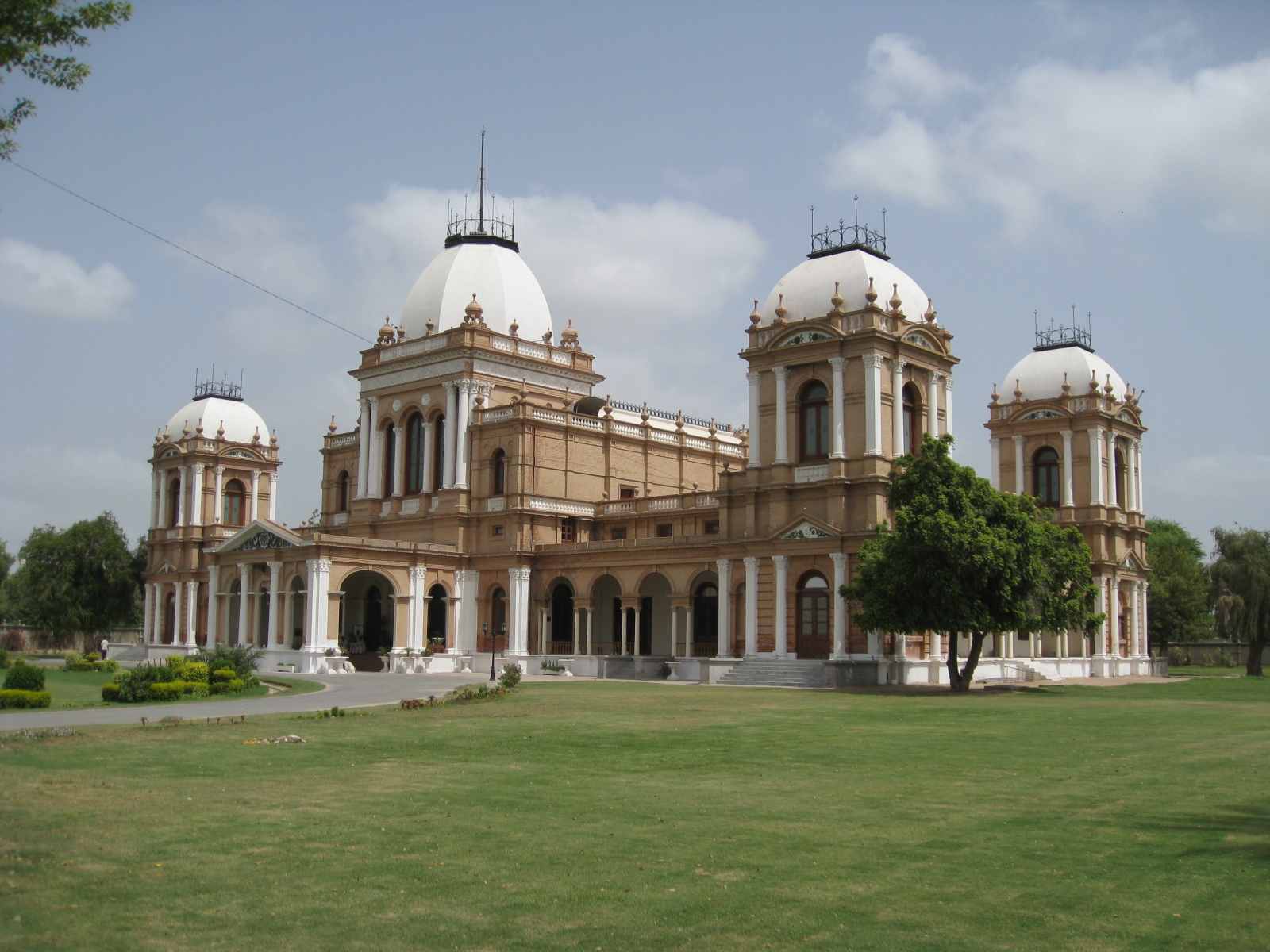
Noor Mahal in Bahawalpur, was one of many palaces of the Nawab

The Bahawalpur State under his rule was considered to be an important sovereign state in Punjab. The Bahawalpur State had a special privilege as it was larger than some states of the present time . Its rulers also enjoyed special protocol and titles conferred by the British since 1866 as they were accorded 17 guns salute and had special access to the Viceroy of British India. Bahawalpur state also had a separate mint to strike coins for its public and the facility remained intact until 1940. The British Government established a Regency Council under the supervision of Maulvi Sir Rahim Bakhsh until the minor Nawab grew up as a young man. This council was responsible for state administration. Special attention was paid to the education and upbringing of Nawab Sadiq Muhammad Khan. He started his education at a college in Lahore and completed it in England. He had an aptitude for military affairs and achieved several military titles, conferred on him by the British Empire. The Viceroy of India, Lord Reading awarded total authority of the state administration to Nawab Sadiq Muhammad Khan (V) on 8 March 1924.

Sir Sadiq continued his military career in the British Indian Army, which he had begun as a Lieutenant in 1921; by 1932 he was a Major, by 1941 a Lieutenant-Colonel, commanding troops in the Middle East during the Second World War. Since 1933, he had also been a Member of the Chamber of Princes, and since 1940, a member of the Indian Defence Council. Promoted to major general in 1946, the following year, on 15 August 1947, Sir Sadeq was promoted to the title of Amir of Bahawalpur. He acceded to the Dominion of Pakistan a month later.

From the 1930s, Sir Sadiq began regularly holidaying in England, purchasing Ardene and the surrounding woodland on the outskirts of Farnham, Surrey. During World War II, this was given over to the community and used as a children's nursery until the end of the war. He then resumed his annual holiday, moving to Selham House near Chichester in 1948.

In 1953, based on the concept of Aitchison College, he donated land for, laid the foundation stone of, and financed the project for building the largest school of Asia in Bahawalpur, namely Sadiq Public School; the school opened in January 1954.

== Later life ==
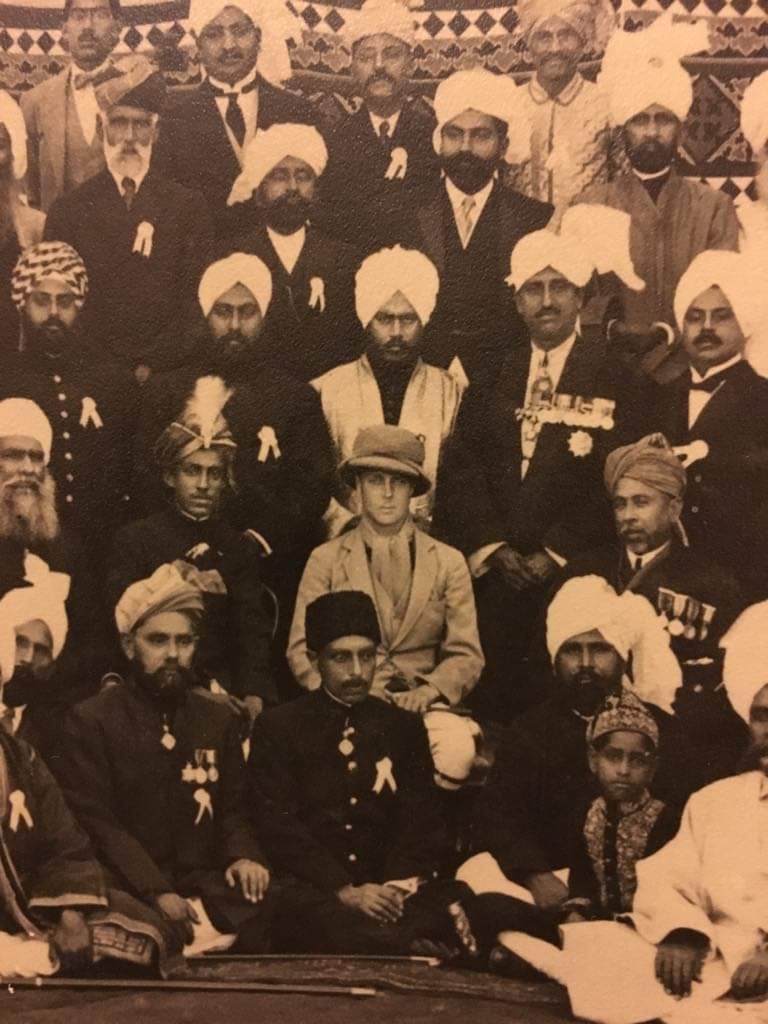
The Prince of Wales (later Duke of Windsor) with Gen. Nawab Sir Sadiq Muhammad Khan Abbasi V of Bahawalpur and others

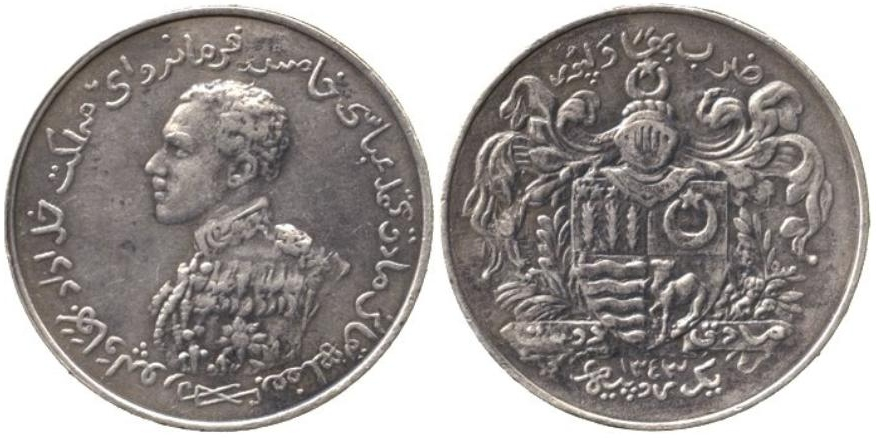
Silver coin of Sadeq

After the partition of India Nawab proved to be very helpful and generous to the government of the Dominion of Pakistan. He gave seventy million rupees to the government and the salaries of all the government departments for one month were also drawn from the treasury of Bahawalpur state. He gave his private property to the University of the Punjab, King Edward Medical College and the Mosque of Aitchison College, Lahore.

At the time of partition, all the princely states of the subcontinent were given the choice of joining the Dominion of Pakistan or the Dominion of India or remaining independent. To try to convince the Nawab to join India, Pandit Nehru went to him while he was in London and offered various incentives in this regard, but he did not accept them. On 5 October 1947, he signed an Instrument of Accession with the government of Pakistan, for Bahawalpur State to accede to Pakistan. Thus the State of Bahawalpur was the first of the states that joined Pakistan.

The main factor was the Islamic sentiments of the Muslims who were in the majority in Bahawalpur. Moreover, the Nawab and Quaid-i-Azam were close friends and they had great respect for each other, even before the creation of Pakistan. The Amir of Bahawalpur Refugee Relief and Rehabilitation Fund was instituted in 1947 for providing a central organization for the relief of refugees fleeing from the new India, and the Quaid-i-Azam acknowledged the valuable contribution of the Bahawalpur State for the rehabilitation of the refugees.

In 1953, Sir Sadiq represented Pakistan at the installation of Faisal II of Iraq and also at the coronation of Elizabeth II, who was also the Queen of Pakistan. In 1955, an accord was signed between Sadiq Mohammad and Governor-General Malik Ghulam Muhammad, according to which the State of Bahawalpur would become part of the province of West Pakistan and the Nawab was to receive a yearly stipend, or privy purse, of 32 lakhs of rupees and was to keep the title of Nawab and its precedence both inside and outside Pakistan.

In May 1966, Nawab Sadiq died in London, which ended his long 59 years as Nawab and Amir of Bahawalpur; his body was brought back to Bahawalpur and was buried in his family's ancestral graveyard at Derawar Fort. His eldest son Nawab Muhammad Abbas Khan Abbasi succeeded to his father's title of Nawab of Bahawalpur. Another son, Saeed-ur-Rashid Abbasi was a Federal Minister of the Government of Pakistan. Sir Sadiq's grandson Nawab Salahuddin Ahmed Abbasi currently holds the title of Nawab purely as a titular distinction.

His descendants of the royal house include: his heir apparent, Nawab Brig. Muhammad Abbas Khan Abbasi (former Governor of Punjab); his grandchildren Nawab Salahuddin Ahmed Abbasi (Urdu: نواب صلاح الدین عباسی) who is a Member of Parliament in Pakistan, Prince Falahuddin Abbasi (who died in London in April 2016, from cancer), Princess Aiysha Yasmien Abbasi and Princess Safia Nausheen Abbasi.

== Death ==
He died on 24 May 1966 in London. He was survived by 23 heirs, and his eldest son, Abbas Abbasi, was recognised as his successor by the Government of Pakistan.

== Titles ==
- 1904–1907: Nawabzada Sadiq Muhammad Khan Abbasi, Wali Ahad Bahadur
- 1907–1921: His Highness Rukn ud-Daula, Saif ud-Daula, Hafiz ul-Mulk, Mukhlis ud-Daula wa Muin ud-Daula, Nawab Sadiq Muhammad Khan Abbasi V Bahadur, Nusrat Jung, Nawab of Bahawalpur.
- 1921–1922: Lieutenant His Highness Rukn ud-Daula, Saif ud-Daula, Hafiz ul-Mulk, Mukhlis ud-Daula wa Muin ud-Daula, Nawab Sadiq Muhammad Khan Abbasi V Bahadur, Nusrat Jung, Nawab of Bahawalpur
- 1922–1924: Lieutenant His Highness Rukn ud-Daula, Saif ud-Daula, Hafiz ul-Mulk, Mukhlis ud-Daula wa Muin ud-Daula, Nawab Sir Sadiq Muhammad Khan Abbasi V Bahadur, Nusrat Jung, Nawab of Bahawalpur, KCVO
- 1924–1929: Captain His Highness Rukn ud-Daula, Saif ud-Daula, Hafiz ul-Mulk, Mukhlis ud-Daula wa Muin ud-Daula, Nawab Sir Sadiq Muhammad Khan Abbasi V Bahadur, Nusrat Jung, Nawab of Bahawalpur, KCVO
- 1929–1931: Captain His Highness Rukn ud-Daula, Saif ud-Daula, Hafiz ul-Mulk, Mukhlis ud-Daula wa Muin ud-Daula, Nawab Sir Sadiq Muhammad Khan Abbasi V Bahadur, Nusrat Jung, Nawab of Bahawalpur, KCSI, KCVO
- 1931–1932: Captain His Highness Rukn ud-Daula, Saif ud-Daula, Hafiz ul-Mulk, Mukhlis ud-Daula wa Muin ud-Daula, Nawab Sir Sadiq Muhammad Khan Abbasi V Bahadur, Nusrat Jung, Nawab of Bahawalpur, GCIE, KCSI, KCVO
- 1932–1935: Major His Highness Rukn ud-Daula, Saif ud-Daula, Hafiz ul-Mulk, Mukhlis ud-Daula wa Muin ud-Daula, Nawab Sir Sadiq Muhammad Khan Abbasi V Bahadur, Nusrat Jung, Nawab of Bahawalpur, GCIE, KCSI, KCVO
- 1935–1941: Major His Highness Rukn ud-Daula, Saif ud-Daula, Hafiz ul-Mulk, Mukhlis ud-Daula wa Muin ud-Daula, Hajji Nawab Sir Sadiq Muhammad Khan Abbasi V Bahadur, Nusrat Jung, Nawab of Bahawalpur, GCIE, KCSI, KCVO
- 1941–1946: Lieutenant-Colonel His Highness Rukn ud-Daula, Saif ud-Daula, Hafiz ul-Mulk, Mukhlis ud-Daula wa Muin ud-Daula, Hajji Nawab Sir Sadiq Muhammad Khan Abbasi V Bahadur, Nusrat Jung, Nawab of Bahawalpur, GCSI, GCIE, KCVO
- 1946–1947: Major-General His Highness Rukn ud-Daula, Saif ud-Daula, Hafiz ul-Mulk, Mukhlis ud-Daula wa Muin ud-Daula, Hajji Nawab Sir Sadiq Muhammad Khan Abbasi V Bahadur, Nusrat Jung, Nawab of Bahawalpur, GCSI, GCIE, KCVO
- 1947–1955: Major-General His Highness Rukn ud-Daula, Saif ud-Daula, Hafiz ul-Mulk, Mukhlis ud-Daula wa Muin ud-Daula, Hajji Nawab Sir Sadiq Muhammad Khan Abbasi V Bahadur, Nusrat Jung, Amir of the God-gifted Kingdom of Bahawalpur, GCSI, GCIE, KCVO
- 1955–1959: General His Highness Rukn ud-Daula, Saif ud-Daula, Hafiz ul-Mulk, Mukhlis ud-Daula wa Muin ud-Daula, Hajji Nawab Sir Sadiq Muhammad Khan Abbasi V Bahadur, Nusrat Jung, Amir of the God-gifted Kingdom of Bahawalpur, GCSI, GCIE, KCVO
- 1959–1966: General His Highness Rukn ud-Daula, Saif ud-Daula, Hafiz ul-Mulk, Mukhlis ud-Daula wa Muin ud-Daula, Hajji Nawab Sir Sadiq Muhammad Khan Abbasi V Bahadur, Nusrat Jung, Amir of the God-gifted Kingdom of Bahawalpur, GCSI, GCIE, KCVO, NQA

== Honours ==
(ribbon bar, as it would look today; incomplete)

- Delhi Durbar gold medal-1911
- 1914–15 Star -1918
- Victory Medal-1918
- Indian Frontier Medal-1921
- Prince of Wales's Visit Medal-1922
- Knight Commander of the Royal Victorian Order (KCVO)-1922
- Knight Grand Commander of the Order of the Indian Empire (GCIE)-1931
- King George V Silver Jubilee Medal-1935
- King George VI Coronation Medal-1937
- Grand Cordon of the Order of the Two Rivers of the Kingdom of Iraq-1941
- Knight Grand Commander of the Order of the Star of India (GCSI)-1941 (KCSI)-1929
- 1939–1945 Star-1945
- Africa Star-1945
- Burma Star-1945
- Italy Star-1945
- Defence Medal-1945
- War Medal 1939–1945-1945
- Pakistan Independence Medal-1947
- Grand Cordon of the Order of the Cedars of Lebanon-1947
- King Faisal II Installation Medal of the Kingdom of Iraq-1953
- Queen Elizabeth II Coronation Medal - 1953
- Order of the Supreme Leader (Nishan-i-Qaid-i-Azam) 1st class of Pakistan - 1959

== See also ==
- Moorish Mosque, Kapurthala

Sadeq Mohammad Khan V Abbasi Dynasty
Regnal titles
Preceded by Mohammad Bahawal Khan V	Nawab of Bahawalpur; 1907–1955	Succeeded by Abbas Abbasi
