= Bahawalpur (princely state) =

State in South Asia (1748–1955)

Coordinates: 28°50′N 71°43′E

State of Bahawalpur بہاولپور دی ریاست
- 1748–1955
- Flag Coat of arms
- Motto: Dōst Sādiq; دوست صادق; "Faithful Friend"
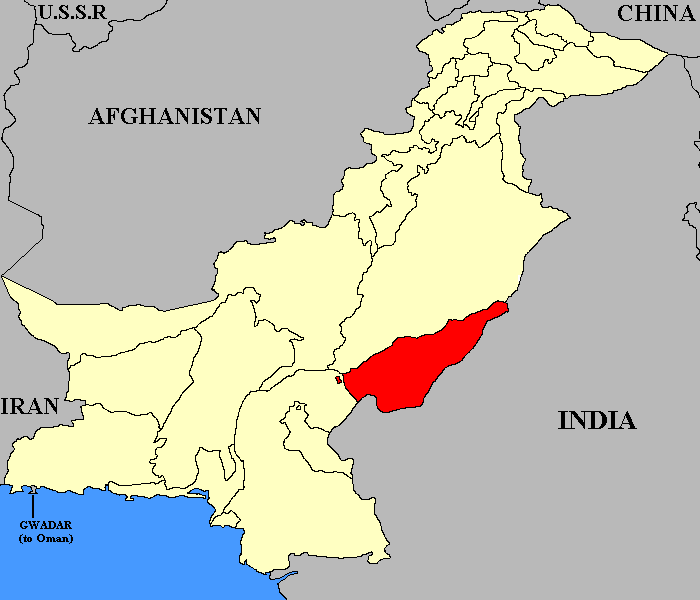
- Bahawalpur State in the Imperial Gazetteer of India
- Status: Sovereign state (1748–1833); Princely state in subsidiary alliance with East India Company (1833–1858); Princely state in subsidiary alliance with the British government under British Raj (1858–1947); Princely state of Pakistan (1947–1955)
- Capital: Bahawalpur
- Common languages: Punjabi; Persian (court, administration); English (diplomacy, administration)
- Ethnic groups: Majority; Punjabis; Minority: Sindhis; Baloch; Rajasthanis
- Religion: Islam (majority, dynastic); Hinduism (minority); Sikhism (minority)
- Government: Hereditary monarchy
- Nawab
  - 1748–1749: Bahawal Khan I (first)
  - 1907–1955: Sadiq Mohammad Khan V (last)
- Prime Minister
  - 1942–1947: Richard Marsh Crofton (first)
  - 1952–1955: A. R. Khan (last)
- Historical era: Early Modern; Late Modern
  - Established: 1748
  - Treaty of Amritsar: 25 April 1809
  - Princely state: 22 February 1833
  - Treaty of Ahmudpore: 5 October 1838
  - Accession to Pakistan: 9 October 1947
  - Merged into West Pakistan: 14 October 1955

Area
  - After Treaty of Amritsar: 45,911 km^{2} (17,726 sq mi)
Preceded by	Succeeded by
Mughal Empire	West Pakistan
- Today part of: Punjab, Pakistan

State of Bahawalpur (Note: Punjabi: بہاولپور دی ریاست; Persian: ایالت بهاولپور; Urdu: ریاست بہاولپور) was a state in the Punjab region of South Asia that existed as a sovereign polity from 1748 to 1833 and as a princely state, under subsidiary alliance with British India from 1833 to 1947 and later Dominion of Pakistan from 1947 to 1955. It was a part of the Punjab States Agency; and covered an area of 45,911 km^{2} (17,726 sq mi) with a population of 1,341,209 in 1941. The capital of the state was the town of Bahawalpur.

The state was founded in 1748 by Nawab Bahawal Khan Abbasi. On 22 February 1833, Abbasi III entered into a subsidiary alliance with the British, by which Bahawalpur was admitted as a princely state. When British rule ended in 1947 and British Raj was partitioned into India and Pakistan, Bahawalpur joined the Dominion of Pakistan. Bahawalpur remained an autonomous entity until 14 October 1955, when it was merged with the province of West Pakistan.

== History ==
The Kingdom of Bahawalpur was established by Bahawal Khan, who belonged to the Daudpotra tribe and had migrated from Shikarpur, Sindh in 1748. By the 18th century, the Nawabs of Bahawalpur had consolidated power by settling his Daudpotra kinsmen on new canal lands along the Sutlej.

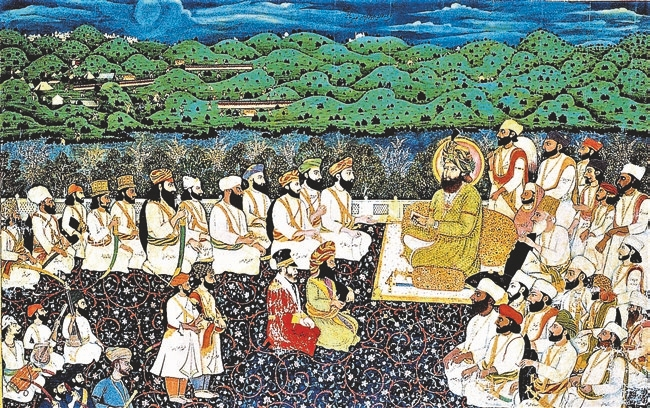
Painting of the Darbar of the Nawab of Bahawalpur State, circa first half of the 19th century

As a part of the 1809 Treaty of Amritsar with British Raj, Ranjit Singh was confined to the right bank of the Sutlej. The first treaty with Bahawalpur was negotiated by British in 1833, the year after the treaty with Ranjit Singh for regulating traffic on the Indus. It secured the independence of the Nawab within his own territories and opened up the traffic on the Indus and Sutlej. The political relations of Bahawalpur with the British Raj were regulated by a treaty made in October 1838, when arrangements were in progress for the restoration of Shah Shuja to the Kabul throne.

During the First Anglo-Afghan War, the Nawab assisted the British with supplies and allowing passage and in 1847–48 he co-operated actively with Sir Herbert Edwardes in the expedition against Multan. For these services, he was rewarded by the grant of the districts of Sabzalkot and Bhung, together with a life-pension of one lakh. On his death, a dispute arose regarding succession. He was succeeded by his third son, whom he had nominated in place of his eldest son. The new ruler was, however, deposed by his elder brother, and obtained asylum in British territory, with a pension from the Bahawalpur revenues; he broke his promise to abandon his claims and was confined in the Lahore Fort, where he died in 1862.

In 1863 and 1866 insurrections broke out against the Nawab who successfully crushed the rebellions; but in March 1866, the Nawab died suddenly, not without suspicion of having been poisoned, and was succeeded by his son, Nawab Sadiq Muhammad Khan IV, a boy of four. After several endeavors to arrange for the administration of the country without active interference on the part of the Government, it was found necessary, on account of disorganization and disaffection, to place the principality in British hands. In 1879, the Nawab was invested with full powers, with the advice and assistance of a council of six members. During the Afghan campaigns (1878–80) the Nawab placed the entire resources of his state at the disposal of the British Indian Government, and a contingent of his troops was employed in keeping open communications, and in guarding the Dera Ghazi Khan frontier. On his death in 1899 he was succeeded by Muhammad Bahawal Khan V, who attained his majority in 1900, and was invested with full powers in 1903. The Nawab of Bahawalpur was entitled to a salute of 17 guns.

=== Independence of Pakistan ===
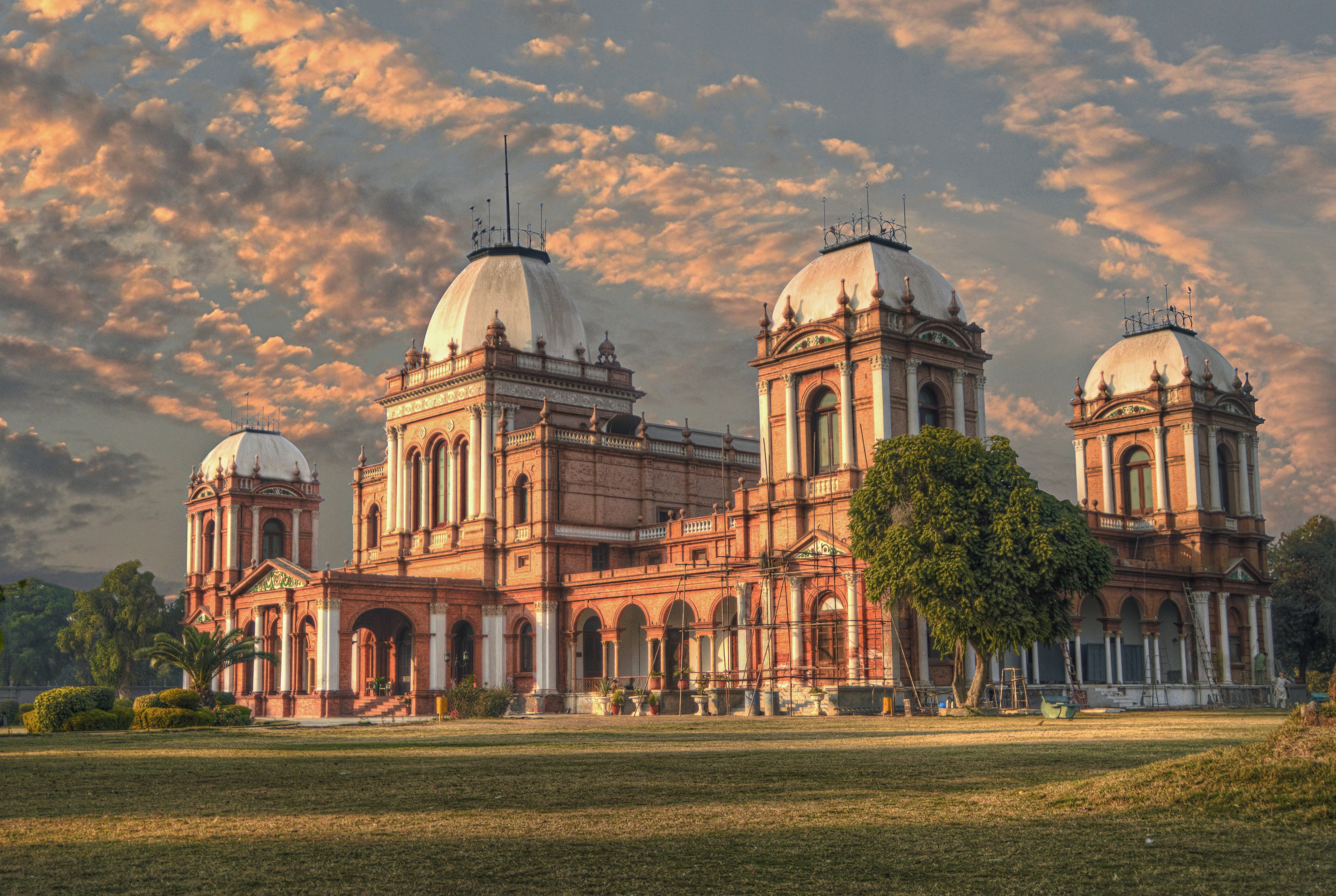
Noor Mahal palace, constructed in 1872 by Sadiq Muhammad Khan IV

The predominantly Muslim population supported the Muslim League and the Pakistan Movement. After the independence of Pakistan in 1947, the minority Hindus and Sikhs migrated to India while the Muslim refugees from India settled in Bahawalpur state. The Nawab of Bahawalpur Sadiq Mohammad Khan V proved to be very helpful and generous to the government of Pakistan. He granted seventy million rupees to the government and the salaries of all the government departments for a couple of months were also drawn from the treasury of Bahawalpur state. He donated his private property to the University of the Punjab, King Edward Medical College and the Mosque of Aitchison College, Lahore. At the time of independence, all the princely states of British India were given a choice to join either Pakistan or India and have no option to remain independent, outside both. On 5 October 1947 the Nawab signed an agreement with the government of Pakistan according to which Bahawalpur State acceded to Pakistan, and the accession was accepted on 9 October. Thus the State of Bahawalpur was the first state to accede to Pakistan.

== Demography ==
Historical population
Year	Pop.	±%
1871	438,699	—
1881	573,494	+30.7%
1891	650,042	+13.3%
1901	720,877	+10.9%
1911	780,641	+8.3%
1921	781,191	+0.1%
1931	984,612	+26.0%
1941	1,341,209	+36.2%
Source: Census in British India

In 1941, Bahawalpur had a population of 1,341,209 of whom 737,474 (54.98%) were men and 603,735 (45.02%) were women. Bahawalpur had a literacy rate of 2.8% (5.1% for males and 0.1% for females) in 1901. The bulk of the population (two-thirds) lived on the fertile Indus River banks with the eastern desert tract being sparsely populated.

Between 1916 and 1941, the population had almost doubled due to the Sutlej Valley Project when vast amounts of Bahawalpur territory were opened to irrigation. There was a migration of Muslims, Hindus and Sikhs to Bahawalpur from other parts of Punjab. These colonists were labelled non-Riyasatis as opposed to locals or "Riyasatis" and were systematically discriminated against in government appointments.

=== Religion ===
The state was predominantly Muslim. According to the 1941 census, Muslims made up 81.9% (1,098,814) of the state's population while Hindus numbered 174,408 (13%) and Sikhs numbered 46,945 (1.84%). While a majority of Muslims and Hindus had their origins in Bahawalpur, a considerable proportion of settlers were migrants from other parts of the Punjab. The Sikhs, on the other hand, were predominantly colonists who had migrated after the opening of canal colonies. The largest Muslim castes were Khokhar, Gujar, Jat and Baloch. The Syeds were also prominent. Most Hindus were Aroras and Khatris with a minority of Jats and Bishnois in Minchinabad and Haroonabad. Half of the Sikhs were Jatt Sikhs and half were Labanas and Rai Sikhs.

Religious groups in Bahawalpur State (British Punjab province era)
Religious group	1881		1891		1901		1911		1921		1931		1941	
Religious group	Pop.	%	Pop.	%	Pop.	%	Pop.	%	Pop.	%	Pop.	%	Pop.	%
Islam	480,274	83.75%	546,680	84.1%	598,139	82.97%	654,247	83.81%	647,207	82.85%	799,176	81.17%	1,098,814	81.93%
Hinduism (Note: 1931-1941: Including Ad-Dharmis)	91,272	15.92%	90,013	13.85%	114,670	15.91%	109,548	14.03%	114,621	14.67%	149,454	15.18%	174,408	13%
Sikhism	1,678	0.29%	13,321	2.05%	7,985	1.11%	16,630	2.13%	19,071	2.44%	34,896	3.54%	46,945	3.5%
Jainism	254	0.04%	17	0%	0	0%	15	0%	1	0%	12	0%	351	0.03%
Christianity	13	0%	11	0%	83	0.01%	199	0.03%	283	0.04%	1,054	0.11%	3,048	0.23%
Zoroastrianism	3	0%	0	0%	0	0%	2	0%	8	0%	20	0%	0	0%
Buddhism	0	0%	0	0%	0	0%	0	0%	0	0%	0	0%	0	0%
Judaism	—N/a	—N/a	0	0%	0	0%	0	0%	0	0%	0	0%	0	0%
Others	0	0%	0	0%	0	0%	0	0%	0	0%	0	0%	17,643	1.32%
Total population	573,494	100%	650,042	100%	720,877	100%	780,641	100%	781,191	100%	984,612	100%	1,341,209	100%
Note: British Punjab province era district borders are not an exact match in the present-day due to various bifurcations to district borders — which since created new districts — throughout the historic Punjab Province region during the post-independence era that have taken into account population increases.

== Legacy ==
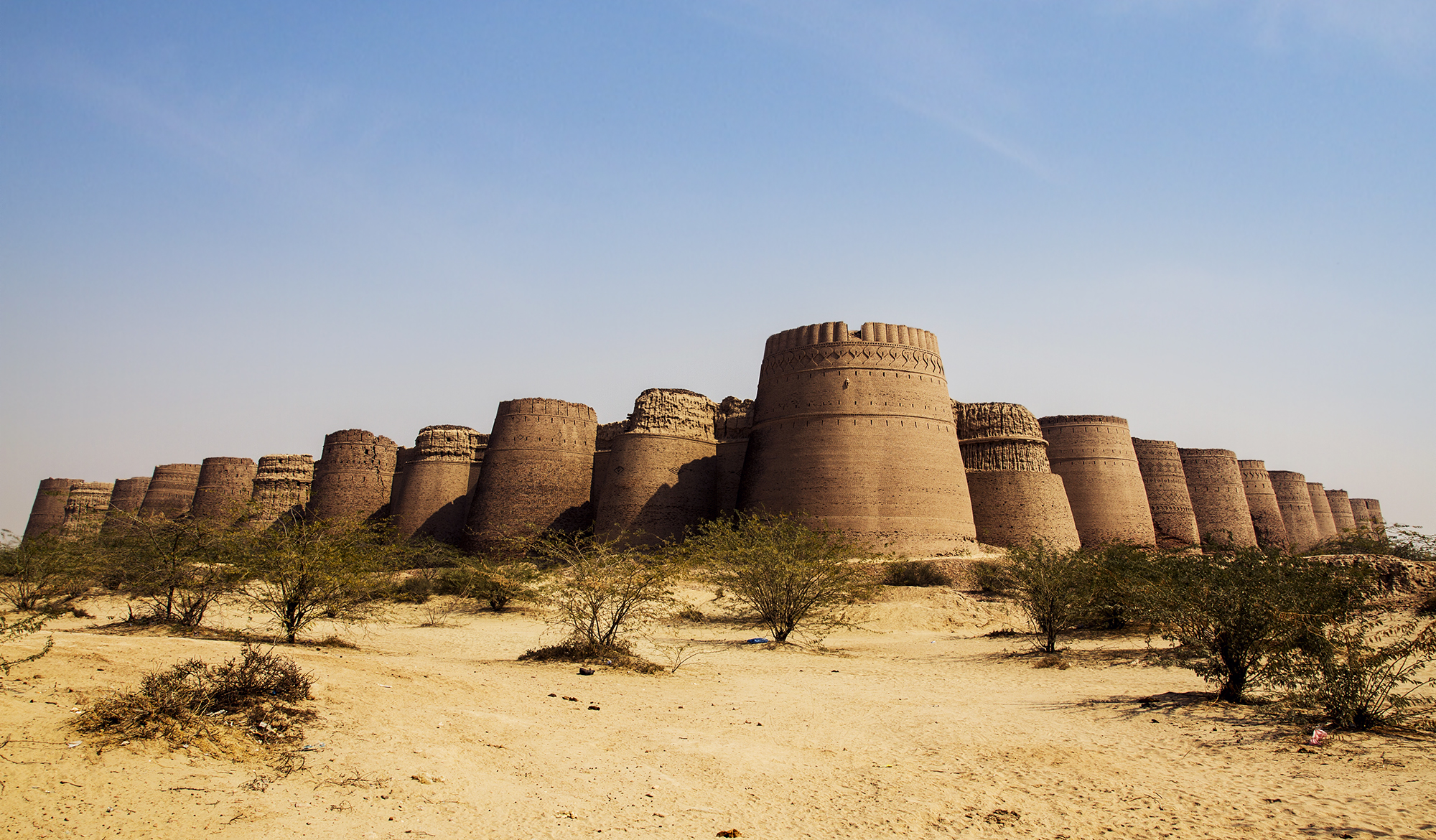
Derawar Fort was a major fort for the Nawabs in the Cholistan Desert

The Nawabs donated portions of their land in Lahore to Punjab University, while the mosque at Aitchison College was also donated by the Nawab. The Bahawalpur Block of the King Edward Medical College was also donated by the Nawab.

== Rulers ==
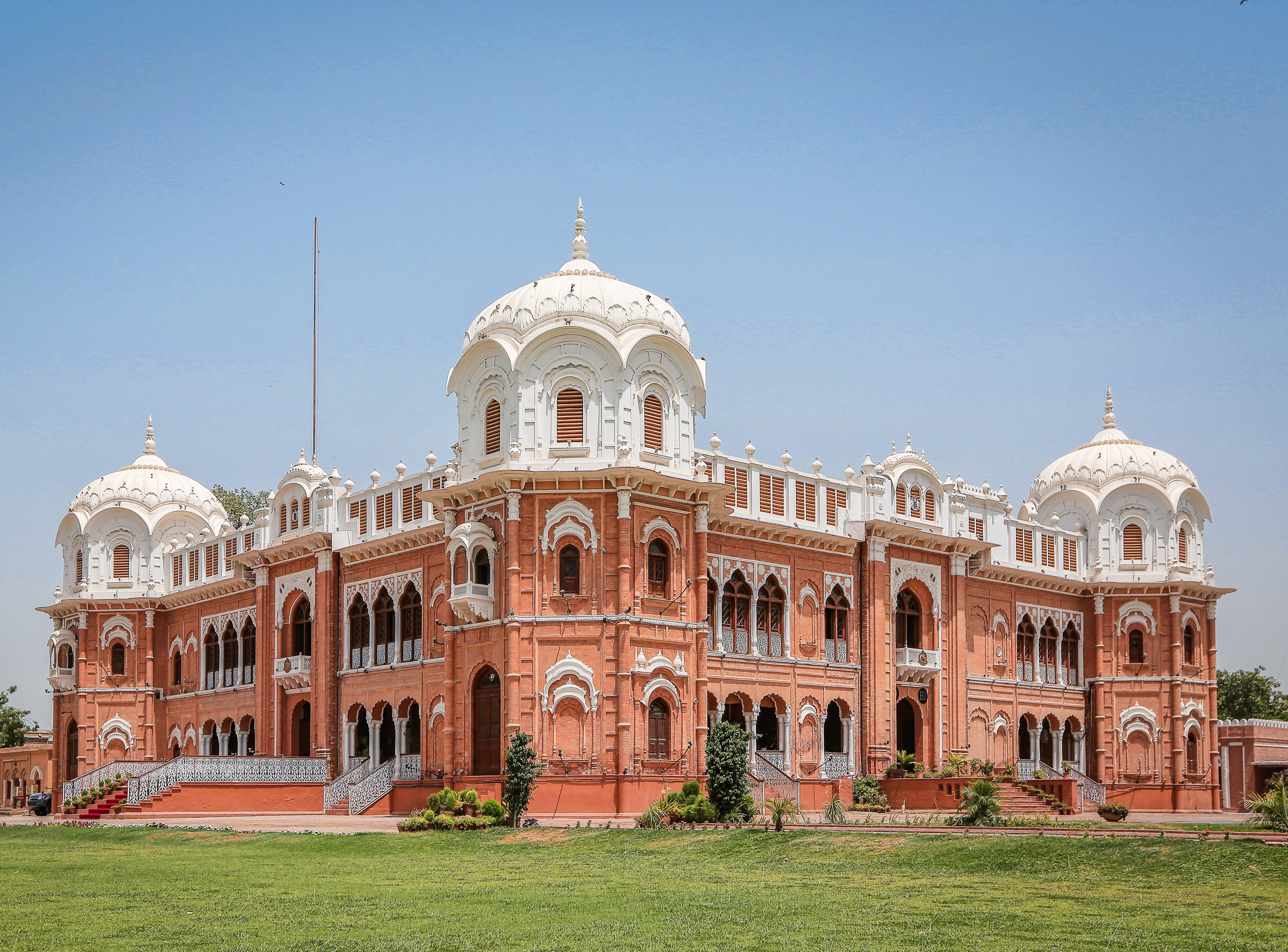
Darbar Mahal palace, constructed in 1905 by Bahawal Khan V

The rulers of Bahawalpur took the title of Amir until 1740, when the title changed to Nawab Amir. Although the title was abolished in 1955 by the Government of Pakistan, the current head of the House of Bahawalpur (Salah ud-Din Muhammad Khan) is referred to as the Amir. From 1942, the Nawabs were assisted by Prime Ministers.

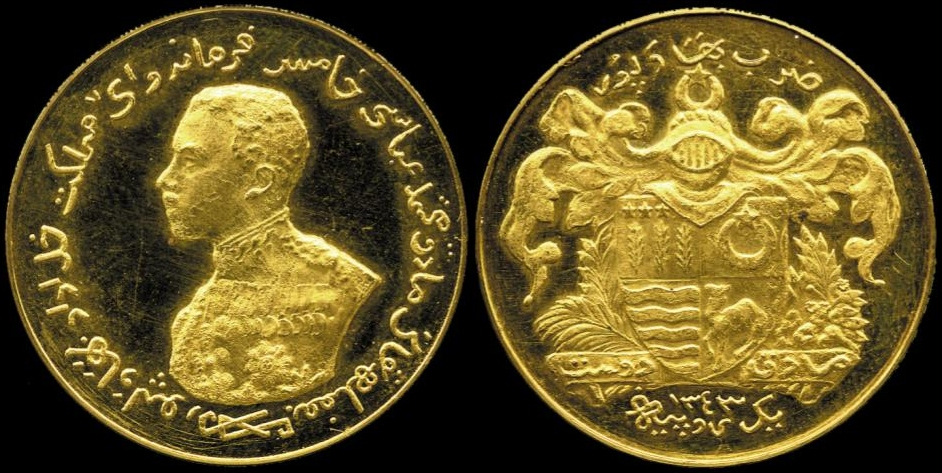
One Rupee gold coin of Sadiq Mohammad Khan V

20th century onwards, Sadiq Muhammad Khan V was the Nawab and later Emir of Bahawalpur State from 1907 to 1966. He became the Nawab on the death of his father, when he was only three years old. In 1955 he signed an agreement with the Governor-General of Pakistan, Malik Ghulam Muhammad, under which Bahawalpur became part of the province of West Pakistan, with effect from 14 October 1955, and the Ameer received a yearly privy purse of 32 lakhs of rupees, keeping his titles. Other members of the present day form of the royal family include: HH Nawab Brig. Muhammad Abbas Khan Abbasi (Last Nawab of Bahawalpur, former Governor of Punjab); Salahuddin Ahmed (Urdu: نواب صلاح الدین عباسی) who was a member of parliament in Pakistan. He is also the grandson of Sadiq Mohammad Khan V, who was the last ruling Nawab of the princely state of Bahawalpur. Prince Muhammad Bahawal (who studied at Aitchison College in Lahore, and graduated from King's College London with a degree in International Political Economy and joined PTI), Prince Falahuddin Abbasi (who died in London in April 2016 from cancer), Begum of Bahawalpur, Princess Aiysha Yasmien Abbasi and Princess Safia Nausheen Abbasi.

Nawab Amir of Bahawalpur	Portrait	Tenure
Muhammad Bahadur Khan		1689 – 1702
Muhammad Mubarak Khan I		1702 – 1723
Sadiq Muhammad Khan I		1723 – 1743
After Formation of Princely State		
Muhammad Bahawal Khan I		1743 – 1749
Muhammad Mubarak Khan II		1749 – 1772
Muhammad Bahawal Khan II		1772 – 1809
Sadiq Muhammad Khan II		1809 – 1827
Muhammad Bahawal Khan III		1827 – 1852
Sadiq Muhammad Khan III		1852 – 1853
Haji Fath Muhammad Khan		1853 – 1858
Rahim Yaar Khan Abbasi		1858 – 1866
Sadiq Muhammad Khan IV		1866 – 1899
Mohammad Bahawal Khan V		1899 – 1907
Sadiq Mohammad Khan V		1907 – 1955
State Abolished		
Sadiq Mohammad Khan V		1955 – 1965
Abbas Khan Abbasi		1965 – 1988
Salahuddin Ahmed Abbasi		1988 – present

Tenure	Prime Minister of Bahawalpur
1942 – 1947	Richard Marsh Crofton
1948 – 1952	John Dring
1952 – 14 October 1955	A.R. Khan
14 October 1955	State of Bahawalpur abolished

== See also ==
- History of Punjab
- Kala Dhari Mandir
