= List of cultural heritage sites in Punjab, Pakistan =

Following is the list of cultural heritage sites in Punjab, Pakistan. The list also includes the three inscribed and seven tentative UNESCO World Heritage Site as well as four national monuments in the province. The provincial government passed the Punjab Special Premises (Preservation) Ordinance, 1985 under which 272 sites have been protected by January 2013.

== Protected sites ==
Following is the list of sites protected by the Federal Government of Pakistan.

National Monuments, UNESCO inscribed and tentative sites

=== Districts Attock to Khanewal ===
ID	Name	Type	Location	District	Coordinates	Image
PB-1	Tomb of Lala Rukh	Shrine	Islam Shaheed Road, Hasan Abdal	Attock	33°49′15″N 72°41′26″E	Tomb of Lala Rukh More images Upload Photo
PB-2	Hakimon ka Maqbara	Shrine	Hasan Abdal	Attock		Hakimon ka Maqbara More images Upload Photo
PB-3	Begum ki Sarai		On N-5 National Highway (G.T. Road), on the left bank of the Indus River right before Attock Bridge near Attock Fort	Attock	33°53′42″N 72°14′18″E	Begum ki Sarai More images Upload Photo
PB-4	Saidan Baoli		G.T Road Hattian	Attock		Saidan Baoli More images Upload Photo
PB-5	Hakim's Shrine	Shrine	Hasan Abdal	Attock		Hakim's Shrine More images Upload Photo
PB-6	Chitti Baoli		Pindi Suleman Makhan	Attock		Upload Photo Upload Photo
PB-7	Attock Fort	Fort	G.T. Road, Attock Bridge	Attock	33°53′31″N 72°14′12″E	Attock Fort More images Upload Photo
PB-8	Attock tomb	Monument	On G.T. Road to Peshawar, 3 kilometres (1.9 mi) away from Attock Bridge	Attock		Attock tomb More images Upload Photo
PB-9	Behram ki Baraddari		Between old and new G.T. Road, opposite Police Station Attock Khurd	Attock		Behram ki Baraddari More images Upload Photo
PB-10	Tope and Monastery (Buddhist remains)	Archaeology site	5 miles (8.0 km) east of Hasan Abdal Baoli Pind	Attock		Tope and Monastery (Buddhist remains) More images Upload Photo
PB-11	Kallar Temple or Sassi da Kallara		Village Shah Muhammad Wali in Talagang Tehsil	Chakwal		Kallar Temple or Sassi da Kallara More images Upload Photo
PB-12	Site at Garhi	Archaeology site?	Village Malak Mala, 6 miles (9.7 km) east of Hasan Abdal	Attock		Upload Photo Upload Photo
PB-13	Inderkot Mosque (Dhai Din Ki Masjid)	Mosque	At a short distance from Inderkot town (mohallah) in Fateh Jang	Attock		Inderkot Mosque (Dhai Din Ki Masjid) More images Upload Photo
PB-14	Buddhist site	Archaeology site	Bihari Colony, Hasan Abdal Town	Attock		Buddhist site More images Upload Photo
PB-15	Noor Mahal	Palace	Bahawalpur	Bahawalpur		Noor Mahal More images Upload Photo
PB-16	Shrine of Jalaluddin Bukhari (and attached mosque)	Shrine	Uch Sharif	Bahawalpur		Shrine of Jalaluddin Bukhari (and attached mosque) More images Upload Photo
PB-17	Tomb of Bibi Jawindi	Shrine	Uch Sharif	Bahawalpur	29°13′29″N 71°03′20″E	Tomb of Bibi Jawindi More images Upload Photo
PB-18	Shrine of Nuriya	Shrine	Uch Sharif	Bahawalpur		Shrine of Nuriya More images Upload Photo
PB-19	Shrine of Baha'al-Halim		Uch Sharif			Shrine of Baha'al-Halim More images Upload Photo
PB-20	Shahi Mosque					Shahi Mosque More images Upload Photo
PB-21	Shrine of Shah Burhan, Chiniot	Shrine	Chiniot	Attock		Shrine of Shah Burhan, Chiniot More images Upload Photo
PB-22	Shrine of Mullah Qaid Shah	Shrine		Dera Ghazi Khan		Shrine of Mullah Qaid Shah More images Upload Photo
PB-23	Shrine of Ghazi Khan	Shrine	In Mulla Quaid Shah Graveyard, Mohalla Zaminaran, Village Chirotta	Dera Ghazi Khan		Shrine of Ghazi Khan More images Upload Photo
PB-24	Ther Dallu Roy		Dajal, Rajanpur	Dera Ghazi Khan		Ther Dallu Roy More images Upload Photo
PB-25	Wangar Wala Tibba	Archaeology site?	Chak No. 742, Toba Tek Singh Tehsil	Faisalabad		Wangar Wala Tibba More images Upload Photo
PB-26	Sheranwala Bagh Baradari		Located in Shera Wala Bagh in Gujranwala city	Gujranwala		Sheranwala Bagh Baradari More images Upload Photo
PB-27	Tomb of Abdul Nabi Khan	mausoleum	Located in the fields outside Village Kotli Maqbara near the town of Wahndo	Gujranwala	32°02′00″N 74°30′40″E	Tomb of Abdul Nabi Khan More images Upload Photo
PB-28	Bahar Wali			Gujrat		Upload Photo Upload Photo
PB-29	Shrine of Shaikh Ali Baig (locally called Hanjeera)	Shrine	Village Helaan (6 kilometres (3.7 mi) from main Gujrat - Phalia Road) in Mandi Bahauddin District, Phalia Tehsil	Mandi Bahauddin	32°28′47″N 73°39′41″E	Shrine of Shaikh Ali Baig (locally called Hanjeera) More images Upload Photo
PB-30	House of Abdus Salam, Jhang	National Monument	Jhang	Jhang	31°18′21″N 72°19′35″E	House of Abdus Salam, Jhang More images Upload Photo
PB-31	Rohtas Fort	Fort	5 miles (8.0 km) from Dina Railway Station, Jhelum	Jhelum	32°57′55″N 73°34′35″E	Rohtas Fort More images Upload Photo
PB-32	Raja Man Singh's Haveli		In Rohtas Fort	Jhelum		Raja Man Singh's Haveli More images Upload Photo
PB-33	Ruined Temple with gateway (Malot temple/Malot fort)	Archaeology site?	Malot	Jhelum		Ruined Temple with gateway (Malot temple/Malot fort) More images Upload Photo
PB-34	Two ancient temples		In Baghanwala, 11 miles (18 km) from Haranpur Railway Station	Jhelum		Two ancient temples More images Upload Photo
PB-35	Murti	Archaeology site	Pind Dadan Khan Tehsil	Jhelum		Upload Photo Upload Photo
PB-36	Ruins of Nandana	Archaeology site	On a hilltop near Baghanwala, 22 kilometres (14 mi) east of Pind Dadan Khan	Jhelum	32°43′41″N 73°14′09″E	Ruins of Nandana More images Upload Photo
PB-37	Katasraj temple (Sardar of Hari Singh's Haveli)	Temple	Katas	Chakwal	32°43′26″N 72°57′04″E	Katasraj temple (Sardar of Hari Singh's Haveli) More images Upload Photo
PB-38	Ruined Buddhist Stupa and area around it	Archaeology site	Katas, Tehsil Pind Dadan Khan	Chakwal		Ruined Buddhist Stupa and area around it More images Upload Photo
PB-39	Satghara Temple	Temple	Katas, Tehsil Pind Dadan Khan	Chakwal		Satghara Temple More images Upload Photo
PB-40	Shrine of Khalid Walid	Shrine	Kabirwala	Khanewal		Shrine of Khalid Walid More images Upload Photo

=== Districts Mianwali to Sialkot ===
ID	Name	Type	Location	District	Coordinates	Image
PB-101	Shershah's baoli		Wan Bhachran	Mianwali		Shershah's baoli More images Upload Photo
PB-102	A buddhist Stupa and area surrounding it	Archaeology site	on the Indus River to the north of Village Rokhari	Mianwali		Upload Photo Upload Photo
PB-103	Sawi Masjid	Mosque	Kotla Tole Khan	Multan		Sawi Masjid More images Upload Photo
PB-104	Tombs of Petrick Alexander Van; Andrew & William Anderson	Monument/landmark	Old Fort	Multan		Tombs of Petrick Alexander Van; Andrew & William Anderson More images Upload Photo
PB-105	Tomb of Shah Rukn-e-Alam	Shrine		Multan		Tomb of Shah Rukn-e-Alam More images Upload Photo
PB-106	Tomb of Shah Ali Akbar's mother	Shrine	Suraj Miani	Multan		Tomb of Shah Ali Akbar's mother More images Upload Photo
PB-107	Tomb of Shams Tabriz	Shrine	Suraj Miani	Multan		Tomb of Shams Tabriz More images Upload Photo
PB-108	Tomb of Shah Ali Akbar and nearby mosque	Shrine	Suraj Miani	Multan		Tomb of Shah Ali Akbar and nearby mosque More images Upload Photo
PB-109	Tomb of Shah Yousuf Gardezi	Shrine		Multan		Tomb of Shah Yousuf Gardezi More images Upload Photo
PB-110	Mound Ratti Khari	Archaeology site?	Head Bust 133, village Bhatianwala, Kaberwala	Multan		Upload Photo Upload Photo
PB-111	Tomb of Mai Maharban	Shrine	Mohallah Kirialoghana, Chowk Fawara Multan	Multan		Tomb of Mai Maharban More images Upload Photo
PB-112	Ruined mosque, Maryala Moun	Mosque/Archaeology site?	Village Sargana 111. Maryala Moun - Chak No. 267/IOR	Multan		Upload Photo Upload Photo
PB-113	Tomb of Tahir Khan Nahar (or Tahar Khan Nahar) and nearby mosque	Shrine	Sitpur	Musaffargarh		Upload Photo Upload Photo
PB-114	Tomb of Sheikh Sadan Shaheed	Shrine	Village Sadan	Muzaffargarh		Tomb of Sheikh Sadan Shaheed More images Upload Photo
PB-115	Mankiala stupa	Archaeological site	Mankiala	Rawalpindi		Mankiala stupa More images Upload Photo
PB-116	Tope or stupa (Buddhist)	Archaeology site?	Bhallar	Rawalpindi		Upload Photo Upload Photo
PB-117	Pharwala Fort	Fort	Pharwala	Rawalpindi		Pharwala Fort More images Upload Photo
PB-118	Losar baoli		Wah Cantonment	Rawalpindi		Losar baoli More images Upload Photo
PB-119	Buddhist remains around Bhallar stupa	Archaeology site	Taxila	Rawalpindi	33°48′49″N 72°49′31″E	Buddhist remains around Bhallar stupa More images Upload Photo
PB-120	Jandial complex	Archaeology site	Taxila	Rawalpindi	33°45′52″N 72°49′44″E	Jandial complex More images Upload Photo
PB-121	Kalawan group of buildings	Archaeology site	Taxila	Rawalpindi	33°43′38″N 72°51′13″E	Kalawan group of buildings More images Upload Photo
PB-122	Kunala stupa and monastery	Archaeology site	Taxila	Rawalpindi	33°45′01″N 72°49′51″E	Upload Photo Upload Photo
PB-123	Sirkap	Archaeology site	Mauza Gangu Bahaddur, Taxila	Rawalpindi	33°45′20″N 72°49′45″E	Sirkap More images Upload Photo
PB-124	Khanpur Cave	Archaeology site	near Mohra Murado Cave, Taxila	Rawalpindi		Khanpur Cave More images Upload Photo
PB-125	Sarai Kala	Archaeology site	near railway station, Taxila	Rawalpindi		Upload Photo Upload Photo
PB-126	Bhir Mound	Archaeology site	Taxila	Rawalpindi	33°44′42″N 72°49′11″E	Bhir Mound More images Upload Photo
PB-127	Dharmarajika stupa and monastery	Archaeology site	Taxila	Rawalpindi	33°44′41″N 72°50′32″E	Dharmarajika stupa and monastery More images Upload Photo
PB-128	Khader Mohra (Akhuri)	Archaeology site	to the south-east of Dharmarajika site, Taxila	Rawalpindi		Upload Photo Upload Photo
PB-129	Mohra Muradu stupa and monastery	Archaeology site	Taxila	Rawalpindi	33°45′39″N 72°51′39″E	Mohra Muradu stupa and monastery More images Upload Photo
PB-130	Giri Mosque and tombs	Archaeology site	Taxila	Rawalpindi/Islamabad Capital Territory	33°43′40″N 72°52′50″E	Upload Photo Upload Photo
PB-131	Giri complex of monuments	Archaeology site	Taxila	Rawalpindi/Islamabad Capital Territory	33°43′39″N 72°53′01″E	Upload Photo Upload Photo
PB-132	Rawat Fort		Village Rawat	Rawalpindi		Rawat Fort More images Upload Photo
PB-133	Nicholson's obelisk	Monument	Margala Pass	Rawalpindi		Nicholson's obelisk More images Upload Photo
PB-134	Kos Minar	Monument	near Golara Railway Station	Rawalpindi		Upload Photo Upload Photo
PB-135	Farudgh-e-Shahan-e-Mughalia		Tank and garden Wah	Rawalpindi		Upload Photo Upload Photo
PB-136	Ratta Pind		Village Gangu Bahadur	Rawalpindi		Upload Photo Upload Photo
PB-137	Archaeological Site of Harappa	Archaeology site	Harappa	Sahiwal		Archaeological Site of Harappa More images Upload Photo
PB-138	Archaeological Museum, Harappa	Archaeology site	Harappa	Sahiwal		Archaeological Museum, Harappa More images Upload Photo
PB-139	Mir Chakar's tomb	Shrine	Satghara	Sahiwal		Mir Chakar's tomb More images Upload Photo
PB-140	Tomb of Syyed Daud Kirmani	Shrine	Shergah	Okara		Tomb of Syyed Daud Kirmani More images Upload Photo
PB-141	Amb Temples	Temple/Archaeology site	Amb, west end of Salt Range	Khushab District		Amb Temples More images Upload Photo
PB-142	Site of ancient city	Archaeology site	Bhera	Sargodha		Upload Photo Upload Photo
PB-143	Site of ancient city	Archaeology site	Vijjhi - 2 milles southwest of Miani known as Sabzal Pind	Sargodha		Upload Photo Upload Photo
PB-144	A red sandstone temple	Temple	Sodhi Zerin	Khushab		Upload Photo Upload Photo
PB-145	Hiran Minar and Tank	Landmark		Sheikhupura		Hiran Minar and Tank More images Upload Photo
PB-146	Baoli and mosque	Mosque	Jandiala Sher Khan	Sheikhupura		Upload Photo Upload Photo
PB-147	Tomb of Abdullah Shah	Shrine	Jandiala Sher Khan	Sheikhupura		Upload Photo Upload Photo
PB-148	Mound Mian Ali Sahib		Mian Ali Faqiran	Sheikhupura		Upload Photo Upload Photo
PB-149	Tibba (Mound)	Archaeology site?	Kala Shah Kaku	Sheikhupura		Upload Photo Upload Photo
PB-150	Tomb of Noor Muhammad	Shrine	Jandiala Sher Khan	Sheikhupura		Upload Photo Upload Photo
PB-151	Tomb of Hafiz Barkhurdar	Shrine	Jandiala Sher Khan	Sheikhupura		Upload Photo Upload Photo
PB-152	Tibba Jolian	Archaeology site?		Sialkot		Tibba Jolian More images Upload Photo

== Special premises ==
The monuments below have been declared Special Premises (protected site) by the Government of Punjab under the 1985 Ordinance.

=== Districts Chiniot to Khushab ===
ID	Name	Type	Location	District	Coordinates	Image
PB-P-1	Shahi Masjid	Mosque		Chiniot		Shahi Masjid More images Upload Photo
PB-P-2	Omar Hayat Mahal (Gulzar Manzil)			Chiniot		Omar Hayat Mahal (Gulzar Manzil) More images Upload Photo
PB-P-3	Al-Sadiq Mosque, Bahawalpur	Mosque		Bahawalpur		Al-Sadiq Mosque, Bahawalpur More images Upload Photo
PB-P-4	Shrine of Jahaniyan Jahangasht and attached mosque	Shrine	Uch Sharif	Bahawalpur	29°14′34″N 71°03′19″E	Shrine of Jahaniyan Jahangasht and attached mosque More images Upload Photo
PB-P-5	Shrine of Mahboob Subhani and attached mosque	Shrine	Uch Sharif	Bahawalpur		Shrine of Mahboob Subhani and attached mosque More images Upload Photo
PB-P-6	Shrine of Syed Fazal ud Din Ladla Bukhari	Shrine	Uch Sharif	Bahawalpur		Shrine of Syed Fazal ud Din Ladla Bukhari More images Upload Photo
PB-P-7	Masjid-e-Hajat	Mosque		Bahawalpur		Masjid-e-Hajat More images Upload Photo
PB-P-8	Shrine of Sibi Tagni	Shrine		Bahawalpur		Upload Photo Upload Photo
PB-P-9	Shrine of Syed Rajan Qattal Bukhari	Shrine	Uch Sharif	Bahawalpur		Shrine of Syed Rajan Qattal Bukhari More images Upload Photo
PB-P-10	Shrine of Salis Bil Khair	Shrine		Bahawalpur		Upload Photo Upload Photo
PB-P-11	Masjid Sahibzadgan	Mosque		Bahawalpur		Upload Photo Upload Photo
PB-P-12	Shrine of Bahawal Haleem	Shrine		Bahawalpur		Shrine of Bahawal Haleem More images Upload Photo
PB-P-13	Shrine of Muluk Shah (Graveyard and old mosque)	Shrine		Bahawalpur		Upload Photo Upload Photo
PB-P-14	Shrine of Hasan Darya Kabir	Shrine	Uch Sharif	Bahawalpur		Shrine of Hasan Darya Kabir More images Upload Photo
PB-P-15	Shrine of Syed Jamal Khandan Darviash	Shrine	Uch Sharif	Bahawalpur		Upload Photo Upload Photo
PB-P-16	Shrine of Raziuddin Ganj-i-Alam Darya	Shrine	Uch Sharif	Bahawalpur		Upload Photo Upload Photo
PB-P-17	Shrine of Safi-ud-Din Garzani	Shrine	Uch Sharif	Bahawalpur		Shrine of Safi-ud-Din Garzani More images Upload Photo
PB-P-18	Shrine of Khawaja Khuda Bux	Shrine	Khairpur Tamiwali	Bahawalpur		Upload Photo Upload Photo
PB-P-19	Khanan Wali Masjid	Mosque	Khairpur Tamiwali	Bahawalpur		Upload Photo Upload Photo
PB-P-20	Masjid Maulvi Abaid Ullah	Mosque		Bahawalpur		Upload Photo Upload Photo
PB-P-21	Shrines of Pir Adil and Imam Ali	Shrine		Dera Ghazi Khan		Shrines of Pir Adil and Imam Ali More images Upload Photo
PB-P-22	Shrine of Hazrat Syed Ahmad Sultan Sakhi Sarwar	Shrine	Muqam village	Dera Ghazi Khan		Shrine of Hazrat Syed Ahmad Sultan Sakhi Sarwar More images Upload Photo
PB-P-23	Shrine of Hazrat Muhammad Suleman Taunsvi	Shrine	Taunsa Sharif	Dera Ghazi Khan		Shrine of Hazrat Muhammad Suleman Taunsvi More images Upload Photo
PB-P-24	Shrine of Khawaja Mahmood	Shrine	Taunsa Sharif	Dera Ghazi Khan		Upload Photo Upload Photo
PB-P-25	Chillah-gah of Sakhi Sarwar	Shrine		Gujranwala		Upload Photo Upload Photo
PB-P-26	Mosque of Sher Shah Suri	Mosque		Gujranwala		Upload Photo Upload Photo
PB-P-27	Dak Chowki of Sher Shah Suri's period			Gujranwala		Dak Chowki of Sher Shah Suri's period More images Upload Photo
PB-P-28	Shrine of Tawakal Shah Rehman	Shrine		Gujrat		Upload Photo Upload Photo
PB-P-29	Shrine of Hafiz Muhammad Hayat and baradari	Shrine		Gujrat		Shrine of Hafiz Muhammad Hayat and baradari More images Upload Photo
PB-P-30	Shrine of Shah Jahangir and attached mosque	Shrine		Gujrat		Upload Photo Upload Photo
PB-P-31	Shrine of Shah Daula	Shrine		Gujrat		Upload Photo Upload Photo
PB-P-32	Gujrat Fort	Fort	Gujrat	Gujrat		Gujrat Fort More images Upload Photo
PB-P-33	Camp (Paraoo or Bardashat Khana)			Gujrat		Upload Photo Upload Photo
PB-P-34	Akbari Hammam		In Mohallah Dhaki, Gujrat	Gujrat		Upload Photo Upload Photo
PB-P-35	Baoli		Kharian	Gujrat		Upload Photo Upload Photo
PB-P-36	Shrine of Shah Saiq Nihang	Shrine		Jhang		Upload Photo Upload Photo
PB-P-37	Shrine of Pir Ghazi	Shrine		Jhang		Upload Photo Upload Photo
PB-P-38	Shrine of Pir Abdur Rehman Qureshi	Shrine		Jhang		Upload Photo Upload Photo
PB-P-39	Shrine of Tajuddin Makhdoom	Shrine		Jhang		Upload Photo Upload Photo
PB-P-40	Shrine of Pir Abdul Razzaq Shah Shab	Shrine		Jhang		Upload Photo Upload Photo
PB-P-41	Shrine of Sultan Bahu	Shrine	Garh Maharaja, Shorkot	Jhang		Shrine of Sultan Bahu More images Upload Photo
PB-P-42	Shrine of Hoo-Bahoo	Shrine		Jhelum		Upload Photo Upload Photo
PB-P-43	Shrine of Saidan Shah	Shrine		Jhelum		Upload Photo Upload Photo
PB-P-44	Shrine of Shah Suleman Paris	Shrine		Jhelum		Shrine of Shah Suleman Paris More images Upload Photo
PB-P-45	Masjid Afghana	Mosque	River Road	Jhelum		Masjid Afghana More images Upload Photo
PB-P-46	Jhando ki Saraj			Jhelum		Upload Photo Upload Photo
PB-P-47	Mosque and temple at Nandana	Mosque	Nandana	Jhelum		Upload Photo Upload Photo
PB-P-48	Shrine of Bulleh Shah	Shrine	Kasur	Kasur		Shrine of Bulleh Shah More images Upload Photo
PB-P-49	Shrine of Baba Kamal Chishti	Shrine	Kasur	Kasur		Shrine of Baba Kamal Chishti More images Upload Photo
PB-P-50	Mosque of Sher Shah Suri's period known as Jinno Wali Mosque	Mosque		Kasur		Mosque of Sher Shah Suri's period known as Jinno Wali Mosque More images Upload Photo
PB-P-51	Shrine of Hussain Shah	Shrine		Khanewal		Upload Photo Upload Photo
PB-P-52	Old Ruined Mosque - Mauza Khatti Chaar	Mosque	Kabirwala	Khanewal		Upload Photo Upload Photo
PB-P-53	Shrine of Eidan Shah - Jahanian Road	Shrine	Khanewal	Khanewal		Upload Photo Upload Photo
PB-P-54	Shrine of Badshahan	Shrine		Khushab		Upload Photo Upload Photo

=== Districts Layyah to Vehari ===
ID	Name	Type	Location	District	Coordinates	Image
PB-P-150	Shrine of Lal Esan	Shrine		Layyah		Shrine of Lal Esan More images Upload Photo
PB-P-151	Shrine of Rajan Shah	Shrine		Layyah		Shrine of Rajan Shah More images Upload Photo
PB-P-152	Shrine of Shah Shamsuddin Sabzwari	Shrine	near Aam-Khas Garden	Multan		Shrine of Shah Shamsuddin Sabzwari More images Upload Photo
PB-P-153	Shrine of Babi Pak Daman	Shrine	near Basti Daira	Multan		Shrine of Babi Pak Daman More images Upload Photo
PB-P-154	Shrine of Syed Musa Pak and attached mosque	Shrine		Multan	29°14′03″N 71°03′41″E	Upload Photo Upload Photo
PB-P-155	Mosque of Nawab Ali Mohammad Khan Khakwani	Mosque		Multan		Upload Photo Upload Photo
PB-P-156	Shrine of Baha-ud-din Zakariya	Shrine		Multan		Shrine of Baha-ud-din Zakariya More images Upload Photo
PB-P-157	Shrine of Sultan Ahmad Qattal	Shrine		Multan		Shrine of Sultan Ahmad Qattal More images Upload Photo
PB-P-158	Shrine of Makhdoom Rashid	Shrine		Multan		Shrine of Makhdoom Rashid More images Upload Photo
PB-P-159	Shrine of Sultan Ayub Qattal	Shrine		Multan		Upload Photo Upload Photo
PB-P-160	Shrine of Shah Dana Shaheed	Shrine		Multan		Shrine of Shah Dana Shaheed More images Upload Photo
PB-P-161	Shrine of Nawab Saee Qureshi	Shrine		Multan		Upload Photo Upload Photo
PB-P-162	Shrine of Khawaja Awais Kagha	Shrine	Daira Basti	Multan		Shrine of Khawaja Awais Kagha More images Upload Photo
PB-P-163	Shrine of Inayat Walait	Shrine		Multan		Upload Photo Upload Photo
PB-P-164	Shrine of Shah Hussain Saddozai	Shrine		Multan		Upload Photo Upload Photo
PB-P-165	Shrine of Hafiz Muhammad Jamal	Shrine		Multan		Shrine of Hafiz Muhammad Jamal More images Upload Photo
PB-P-166	Shrine of Hamid Shah Gilani	Shrine		Multan		Upload Photo Upload Photo
PB-P-167	Shrine of Yahya Sakhi Nawab	Shrine		Multan		Upload Photo Upload Photo
PB-P-168	Masjid Khuddaka	Mosque	Chowk Fawara	Multan		Upload Photo Upload Photo
PB-P-169	Shrine of Ali Sarwar	Shrine		Multan		Upload Photo Upload Photo
PB-P-170	Shrine of Mian Dalail	Shrine		Multan		Upload Photo Upload Photo
PB-P-171	Shrine of Shah Ali Mardan	Shrine	near Chowk Shaheedan, Akbar Road	Multan		Shrine of Shah Ali Mardan More images Upload Photo
PB-P-172	Shrine of Allah Dad Ghormani	Shrine		Multan		Upload Photo Upload Photo
PB-P-173	Shrine of Pir Luddan Kuddan	Shrine	Kultan	Multan		Upload Photo Upload Photo
PB-P-174	Shahi Eid Gah Mosque	Mosque	Khanewal rd near chungi no 9	Multan		Shahi Eid Gah Mosque More images Upload Photo
PB-P-175	Jamia Mosque	Mosque	Khairpur Bhutta	Multan		Jamia Mosque More images Upload Photo
PB-P-176	Masjid Wazir Khan	Mosque		Multan		Masjid Wazir Khan More images Upload Photo
PB-P-177	Prahladpuri Temple	Temple		Multan		Prahladpuri Temple More images Upload Photo
PB-P-178	Suraj Kund Temple	Temple	Suraj Kund	Multan		Upload Photo Upload Photo
PB-P-179	Old Mosque at Basti Hasil Wali	Mosque	Lodhran	Multan		Old Mosque at Basti Hasil Wali More images Upload Photo
PB-P-180	Old Mosque near Bela Wagha	Mosque	Lodhran	Multan		Old Mosque near Bela Wagha More images Upload Photo
PB-P-181	Old Mosque at Busti Mansoor Shah Wali	Mosque	Kahror Pakka Tehsil	Lodhran	29°36′57″N 71°59′48″E	Old Mosque at Busti Mansoor Shah Wali More images Upload Photo
PB-P-182	Mosque at Basti Zirakhwah	Mosque	Lodhran	Multan		Upload Photo Upload Photo
PB-P-183	Shrine of Handira Pir	Shrine	Karor Pueca	Multan		Upload Photo Upload Photo
PB-P-184	Shrine of Sheikh Ahma Kabir and nearby ruined Mosque	Shrine	Dhanat, Lodhran	Multan		Shrine of Sheikh Ahma Kabir and nearby ruined Mosque More images Upload Photo
PB-P-185	Shrine of Sheikh Muhammad Ismail Qureshi	Shrine	Basti Umar Pur, Jalalpur Pirwala, Shujabad	Multan		Shrine of Sheikh Muhammad Ismail Qureshi More images Upload Photo
PB-P-186	Shrine of Pir Aulia-e-Ghauri	Shrine	Bahaderpur, Jalalpur Pirwala, Shujabad	Multan		Shrine of Pir Aulia-e-Ghauri More images Upload Photo
PB-P-187	Fortification wall of Shujabad city		Shujabad	Multan		Fortification wall of Shujabad city More images Upload Photo
PB-P-188	Shrine of Sakhi Abdul Wahab Bukhari	Shrine	Dera Din Panah	Muzaffargarh		Upload Photo Upload Photo
PB-P-189	Shrine of Sheikh Ludho	Shrine		Muzaffargarh		Upload Photo Upload Photo
PB-P-190	Shrine of Sultan Manjhan	Shrine	at Basti Sultan Manjhan	Muzaffargarh		Upload Photo Upload Photo
PB-P-191	Shrine of Buha Sher	Shrine		Muzaffargarh		Upload Photo Upload Photo
PB-P-192	Shrine of Muhammad Anwar	Shrine	Kunnal Sharif	Muzaffargarh		Upload Photo Upload Photo
PB-P-193	Shrine of Ghous Muhammad Bala Pir	Shrine	Sat Garah	Okara		Shrine of Ghous Muhammad Bala Pir More images Upload Photo
PB-P-194	Bhong Mosque	Mosque	Bhong, Sadiqabad	Rahim Yar Khan		Bhong Mosque More images Upload Photo
PB-P-195	Faridi Mahal			Rajanpur		Faridi Mahal More images Upload Photo
PB-P-196	Shrine of Sadar-ud-Din Shamsi and his son	Shrine	Tarandah, Liaqatpur	Rahim Yar Khan		Upload Photo Upload Photo
PB-P-197	Shrine of Khwaja Ghulam Farid	Shrine	Kot Mithan	Rajanpur		Shrine of Khwaja Ghulam Farid More images Upload Photo
PB-P-198	Shrine of Taj Mahmud	Shrine		Rajanpur		Upload Photo Upload Photo
PB-P-199	Shrine of Noor Muhammad Hassan	Shrine	Hajipur	Rajanpur		Upload Photo Upload Photo
PB-P-200	Harand Fort	Fort	Jampur/Dajal	Rajanpur		Harand Fort More images Upload Photo
PB-P-201	Sarai Kharbuza		on Feteh Jang Road	Rawalpindi		Upload Photo Upload Photo
PB-P-202	Shrine of Ala-ud-Din Mauj Darya	Shrine		Sahiwal		Upload Photo Upload Photo
PB-P-203	Jamiah Masjid	Mosque	Bhera	Sargodha		Upload Photo Upload Photo
PB-P-204	Shrine of Abdul Khair Nau Lakh Hazari	Shrine		Sheikhupura		Upload Photo Upload Photo
PB-P-205	Shrine of Mian Sher Muhammad Sharaqpuri	Shrine		Sheikhupura		Upload Photo Upload Photo
PB-P-206	Shrine of Imam Ali-ul-Haq	Shrine		Sialkot		Shrine of Imam Ali-ul-Haq More images Upload Photo
PB-P-207	Shrine of Syed Murad Ali Shah	Shrine		Sialkot		Shrine of Syed Murad Ali Shah More images Upload Photo
PB-P-208	Shrine of Hazrat Imam Ali-ul-Haq, Sialkot	Shrine		Sialkot		Upload Photo Upload Photo
PB-P-209	Shrine of Abdul Salam Chishti	Shrine		Sialkot		Shrine of Abdul Salam Chishti More images Upload Photo
PB-P-210	Shrine of Qutb Shah Wali	Shrine		Sialkot		Upload Photo Upload Photo
PB-P-211	Shrine of Mir Muhammad Zarif	Shrine		Sialkot		Upload Photo Upload Photo
PB-P-212	Shrine of Baba Haji Sher Dewan Chawli Mashaikh	Shrine	Burewala	Vehari		Shrine of Baba Haji Sher Dewan Chawli Mashaikh More images Upload Photo
PB-P-213	Shrine of Abu-Bakar Barraq Mailsi	Shrine		Vehari		Upload Photo Upload Photo

== Unprotected Sites ==
ID	Name	Type	Location	District	Coordinates	Image
PB-U-1	Fareed Gate	Gate		Bahawalpur		Fareed Gate More images Upload Photo
PB-U-2	Central Library	Public building	Bahawalpur	Bahawalpur		Central Library More images Upload Photo
PB-U-3	Abbasi Mosque	Mosque		Bahawalpur		Abbasi Mosque More images Upload Photo
PB-U-4	Noor Mahal	Landmark/palace		Bahawalpur		Noor Mahal More images Upload Photo
PB-U-5	Derawar Fort	Fort		Bahawalpur		Derawar Fort More images Upload Photo
PB-U-6	Sadiq Dane High School	Public building/school	Near Farid Gate	Bahawalpur		Sadiq Dane High School More images Upload Photo
PB-U-7	Bahawal Victoria Hospital		Circular Road, Bahawalpur	Bahawalpur		Bahawal Victoria Hospital More images Upload Photo
PB-U-8	Masjid-e-Aqsa	Mosque	Chenab Nagar (Rabwah)	Chiniot		Masjid-e-Aqsa More images Upload Photo
PB-U-9	Chiniot railway station	Railway station	Chiniot	Chiniot		Upload Photo Upload Photo
PB-U-10	Faisalabad railway station	Railway station	Faisalabad	Faisalabad		Faisalabad railway station More images Upload Photo
PB-U-11	Faisalabad Arts Council	Theatre	Faisalabad	Faisalabad		Faisalabad Arts Council More images Upload Photo
PB-U-12	Sunni Rizwi Masjid	Mosque		Faisalabad		Sunni Rizwi Masjid More images Upload Photo
PB-U-13	Government College University	Educational institution	Faisalabad	Faisalabad		Government College University More images Upload Photo
PB-U-14	Gurdwara-School	Educational institution	Faisalabad	Faisalabad		Gurdwara-School More images Upload Photo
PB-U-15	Clock Tower	Landmark/Clock Tower		Faisalabad		Clock Tower More images Upload Photo
PB-U-16	Monument to Sir James Broadwood Lyall	Monument		Faisalabad		Monument to Sir James Broadwood Lyall More images Upload Photo
PB-U-17	St. Mary's Catholic Church	Church	Buttranwali	Gujranwala		St. Mary's Catholic Church More images Upload Photo
PB-U-18	Nishan-E-Manzil	Landmark		Gujranwala		Nishan-E-Manzil More images Upload Photo
PB-U-19	Gujranwala railway station	Railway station	Gujranwala	Gujranwala		Gujranwala railway station More images Upload Photo
PB-U-20	University of the Punjab	Educational institution		Gujranwala		University of the Punjab More images Upload Photo
PB-U-21	Mohri Darbar	Shrine	Mohri Sharif, Kharian	Gujrat		Mohri Darbar More images Upload Photo
PB-U-22	Shrine of Heer Ranjha	Shrine		Jhang		Shrine of Heer Ranjha More images Upload Photo
PB-U-23	Jinnah Hall	Government building		Jhang		Jinnah Hall More images Upload Photo
PB-U-24	Jhang railway station	Railway station		Jhang		Upload Photo Upload Photo
PB-U-25	Hindu Temples	Temple/Archaeological site	Tilla Jogian	Jhelum		Hindu Temples More images Upload Photo
PB-U-26	Major Akram Shaheed Memorial	Landmark/Memorial		Jhelum		Major Akram Shaheed Memorial More images Upload Photo
PB-U-27	St. John's Church	Landmark	Jhelum	Jhelum		St. John's Church More images Upload Photo
PB-U-28	Jhelum railway station	Railway station	Jhelum	Jhelum		Jhelum railway station More images Upload Photo
PB-U-29	Shrine of Mu'izz al-Din Muhammad	Shrine	Sohawa	Jhelum		Shrine of Mu'izz al-Din Muhammad More images Upload Photo
PB-U-30	Khanewal Junction railway station	Railway station		Khanewal		Khanewal Junction railway station More images Upload Photo
PB-U-41	Multan Arts Council	Theatre	MDA Road, Multan	Multan		Multan Arts Council More images Upload Photo
PB-U-42	Ghanta Ghar	Clock tower	Multan	Multan		Ghanta Ghar More images Upload Photo
PB-U-43	Bloody Bastion	Fort	City Wall of Multan	Multan		Bloody Bastion More images Upload Photo
PB-U-44	Gurdwara Janam Asthan	Gurdwara		Nankana Sahib		Gurdwara Janam Asthan More images Upload Photo
PB-U-45	Rahim Yar Khan railway station	Railway station	Rahim Yar Khan	Rahim Yar Khan		Rahim Yar Khan railway station More images Upload Photo
PB-U-46	Rawalpindi Arts Council	Theatre	Stadium Road, Murree Road, Rawalpindi	Rawalpindi		Upload Photo Upload Photo
PB-U-47	Holy Trinity Church	Church	Murree	Rawalpindi		Holy Trinity Church More images Upload Photo
PB-U-48	Rawalpindi railway station	Railway station	Rawalpindi	Rawalpindi		Rawalpindi railway station More images Upload Photo
PB-U-49	Bedi Mahal	Palace	Kallar Syedan	Rawalpindi		Bedi Mahal More images Upload Photo
PB-U-50	Taxila Museum	Museum	Taxila	Rawalpindi		Taxila Museum More images Upload Photo
PB-U-51	Masjid Gulshan Dadan Khan	Mosque		Rawalpindi		Masjid Gulshan Dadan Khan More images Upload Photo
PB-U-52	The Mess Hall	Government building	Rawalpindi	Rawalpindi		The Mess Hall More images Upload Photo
PB-U-53	Christ Church	Church	Tamiz-ud-Din Road, Rawalpindi	Rawalpindi		Christ Church More images Upload Photo
PB-U-54	Presentation Convent High School	Educational institution	Rawalpindi	Rawalpindi		Presentation Convent High School More images Upload Photo
PB-U-55	St. Joseph's Cathedral	Church	Rawalpindi	Rawalpindi		St. Joseph's Cathedral More images Upload Photo
PB-U-56	Pakistan Army Museum	Museum	Iftikhar Janjua Road, Rawalpindi	Rawalpindi		Pakistan Army Museum More images Upload Photo
PB-U-57	Qilla Sheikhupura	Fort		Sheikhupura		Qilla Sheikhupura More images Upload Photo
PB-U-58	Clock Tower	Landmark/Clock Tower		Sialkot		Clock Tower More images Upload Photo
PB-U-59	Sialkot Fort	Fort		Sialkot		Sialkot Fort More images Upload Photo
PB-U-60	Sialkot Cathedral	Church	Sialkot	Sialkot		Sialkot Cathedral More images Upload Photo
PB-U-61	Sialkot Junction railway station	Railway station		Sialkot		Sialkot Junction railway station More images Upload Photo
PB-U-62	Iqbal Manzil	Museum	Bazar Khatikan. Iqbal Manzil Road, Sialkot	Sialkot		Iqbal Manzil More images Upload Photo
PB-U-64	Murray College (main building) (1889)	Educational Institution	Sialkot	Sialkot		Murray College (main building) (1889) More images Upload Photo
PB-U-65	Fort of Mahmood Kot			Muzaffargarh		Upload Photo Upload Photo
PB-U-66	Sangni Fort	Palace	Rawalpindi	Rawalpindi		Sangni Fort More images Upload Photo
PB-U-67	Central Mosque Wah Cantt	Mosque	Wah Cantt	Rawalpindi		Central Mosque Wah Cantt More images Upload Photo
PB-U-68	Darbar Mahal	Palace	Bahawalpur	Bahawalpur		Darbar Mahal More images Upload Photo
PB-U-69	Eid Gah	Mosque		Gujrat		Eid Gah More images Upload Photo
PB-U-70	Wah Mughal Gardens		Wah Cantt	Rawalpindi		Wah Mughal Gardens More images Upload Photo
PB-U-71	Hasan Abdal railway station		Hasan Abdal	Attock		Upload Photo Upload Photo
PB-U-72	Masjid Deen Muhammad Khan	mosque	Muhammad Pur Deewan	Jam Pur	29°28′10″N 70°30′44″E	Masjid Deen Muhammad Khan More images Upload Photo
