= Punjab Council of Arts =

Cultural institute in Lahore

- شورای فنون پنجاب

Agency overview
- Type: Governmental Institution
- Jurisdiction: Punjab, Pakistan
- Headquarters: Lahore
- Agency executive: Executive Director
- Parent department: Punjab Information and Culture Department
- Website: Official Website

Punjab Council of Arts also known as Punjab Arts Council, is a provincial institute under the Punjab Information and Culture Department, Government of Punjab, to promote arts, culture and literature in Punjab province of Pakistan.

The headquarters of the Council is located at 53-Shadman-II Lahore. A Board of Governors and Executive Committee are composed of literary, intellectual, and artistic personalities and public representatives.

== History ==
The Punjab Council of Arts Act of 1975 required establishment of divisional and district arts councils to promote art and culture and to provide facilities to artists and artisans to give them exposure and provide financial assistance, as well as giving them a platform and encouragement.

The organization carries out its activities in accordance with Punjab Council of Arts Regulations 1982.

== Divisional and District Arts Councils ==
=== Divisional ===
- Bahawalpur Arts Council
- Dera Ghazi Khan Arts Council
- Faisalabad Arts Council
- Gujranwala Arts Council
- Gujrat Arts Council
- Lahore Arts Council
- Multan Arts Council
- Rawalpindi Arts Council
- Sahiwal Arts Council
- Sargodha Arts Council

=== District ===
- Bhakkar Arts Council
- Murree Arts Council
- Okara Arts Council
- Shiekhupura Arts Council
