= Azma Bukhari =

Member of the Punjab Assembly

Punjab Information and Culture Department
- Incumbent
- Assumed office 4 March 2025
- Deputy: Rana Sanaullah
- Preceded by: Hina Pervaiz Butt

Provincial Minister for Information and Culture Punjab
- Incumbent
- Assumed office 7 March 2024
- Chief Minister: Maryam Nawaz

Member of the Provincial Assembly of Punjab
- Incumbent
- Assumed office 27 February 2024
- Constituency: W-301
- In office 15 August 2018 – 14 January 2023
- Constituency: W-301
- In office 1 June 2013 – 31 May 2018
- Constituency: W-301
- In office 9 April 2008 – 20 March 2013
- Constituency: W-301
- In office 25 November 2002 – 17 November 2007
- Constituency: W-301

Personal details
- Born: 18 August 1976 (age 50) Faisalabad, Punjab, Pakistan
- Party: PMLN (2013-present)
- Other political affiliations: PPP (2002-2013)
- Spouse: Sami Ullah Khan

Azma Zahid Bukhari (Punjabi, Urdu: عظمیٰ زاہد بخاری; born 18 August 1976) is a Pakistani politician who is currently serving as provisional minister for Punjab Information and Culture Department. She has been elected as the member of the Provincial Assembly of Punjab since 2002 on seat reserved for women. She is a practising lawyer in the Lahore High Court and is the daughter of Syed Zahid Hussain Bukhari, who is known for securing a release for Raymond Davis.

== Early life and education ==
She was born on 18 August 1976 in Faisalabad to the former justice of the Lahore High Court, Syed Zahid Hussain Bukhari, who is known for representing and securing a release for Raymond Davis in the 2011 2011 Lahore shooting incident.

She received her early education from Sheikhupura and earned a Bachelor of Arts from the Punjab University. She earned Bachelor of Laws in 2001 from Pakistan College of Law and is practicing as a lawyer.

== Political career ==
She was elected to the Provincial Assembly of the Punjab as a candidate of Pakistan Peoples Party (PPP) on a reserved seat for women in the 2002 Pakistani general election.

She was re-elected to the Provincial Assembly of the Punjab as a candidate of PPP on a reserved seat for women in the 2008 Pakistani general election.

In February 2013, she joined Pakistan Muslim League (N) (PML-N).

She was re-elected to the Provincial Assembly of the Punjab as a candidate of PML-N on a reserved seat for women in the 2013 Pakistani general election.

She was re-elected to the Provincial Assembly of the Punjab as a candidate of PML-N on a reserved seat for women in the 2018 Pakistani general election.

She was re-elected to the Provincial Assembly of the Punjab as a candidate of PML-N on a reserved seat for women in the 2024 Pakistani general election.
