= Punjab Information and Culture Department =

Pakistani provincial ministry

Information and Culture Department is a department of the Government of Punjab, Pakistan. Information Department works to project and promote policies and activities of the Government. The department also promotes art, culture and literary activities.

== Institutions ==
=== Directorate General Public Relations ===
The Directorate General Public Relations, Punjab is the main publicity arm of the Government. It deals with dissemination of Information, Public Relations, focusing on projection of official policies, activities and development programmes and maintaining a close liaison with the press.

=== Lahore Museum ===
Lahore Museum is the largest and the oldest museum in Pakistan, it was established in 1894.

=== Punjab Council of the Arts ===
The Punjab Council of the Arts is an autonomous body established under the Punjab Council of the Arts Act of 1975. It advises the Government on all matters of policy relating to art and culture activity through its Divisional Arts Councils which include the Multan Arts Council, Bahawalpur Arts Council, D.G. Khan Arts Council, Faisalabad Arts Council, Rawalpindi Arts Council, Gujranwala Arts Council, Sargodha Arts Council, Murree Arts Council, and Waris Shah Memorial Complex.

=== Pakistan Movement Workers Trust ===
An established 'Trust' for the assistance of the veterans of Pakistan Movement.

=== Punjab Film Censor Board (PFCB) ===
The Central Board of Film Censors has been devolved by virtue of 18th Amendment in the Constitution of Pakistan and branch office at Lahore was transferred to the Information & Culture Department, Government of the Punjab. The Federal Law “Motion Picture Ordinance, 1979” has been adopted through an Act "Punjab Motion Pictures (Amendment) Act, 2012” (X of 2013)" after certain amendments. The Punjab Censorship of Films Rules, 2013 have also been framed. PFCB censors films prior to exhibition in Punjab.

=== Bab-e-Pakistan Trust ===
The Bab-e-Pakistan Trust (Pakistan) was constituted in Lahore in 1992. The main objective was to set up a complex in memory of those who scarified all they had including their lives to make Pakistan possible.

=== Bazm-e-Iqbal ===
Bazm-e-Iqbal was established as autonomous body in May, 1950 under the societies Registration Act, 1860. The Bazm carries out research and publication on the philosophy and teachings of Iqbal.

=== Institute of Islamic Culture, Lahore ===
The organisation publishes some of the most respected works on the history and philosophy of Islam.

== See also ==
- Ministry of Information and Broadcasting
- Culture of Pakistan
- Punjabi culture
