= Tomb of Bibi Jawindi =

Shrine built in the spirit of Bibi Jawindi

- مقبرہ بی بی جیوندی
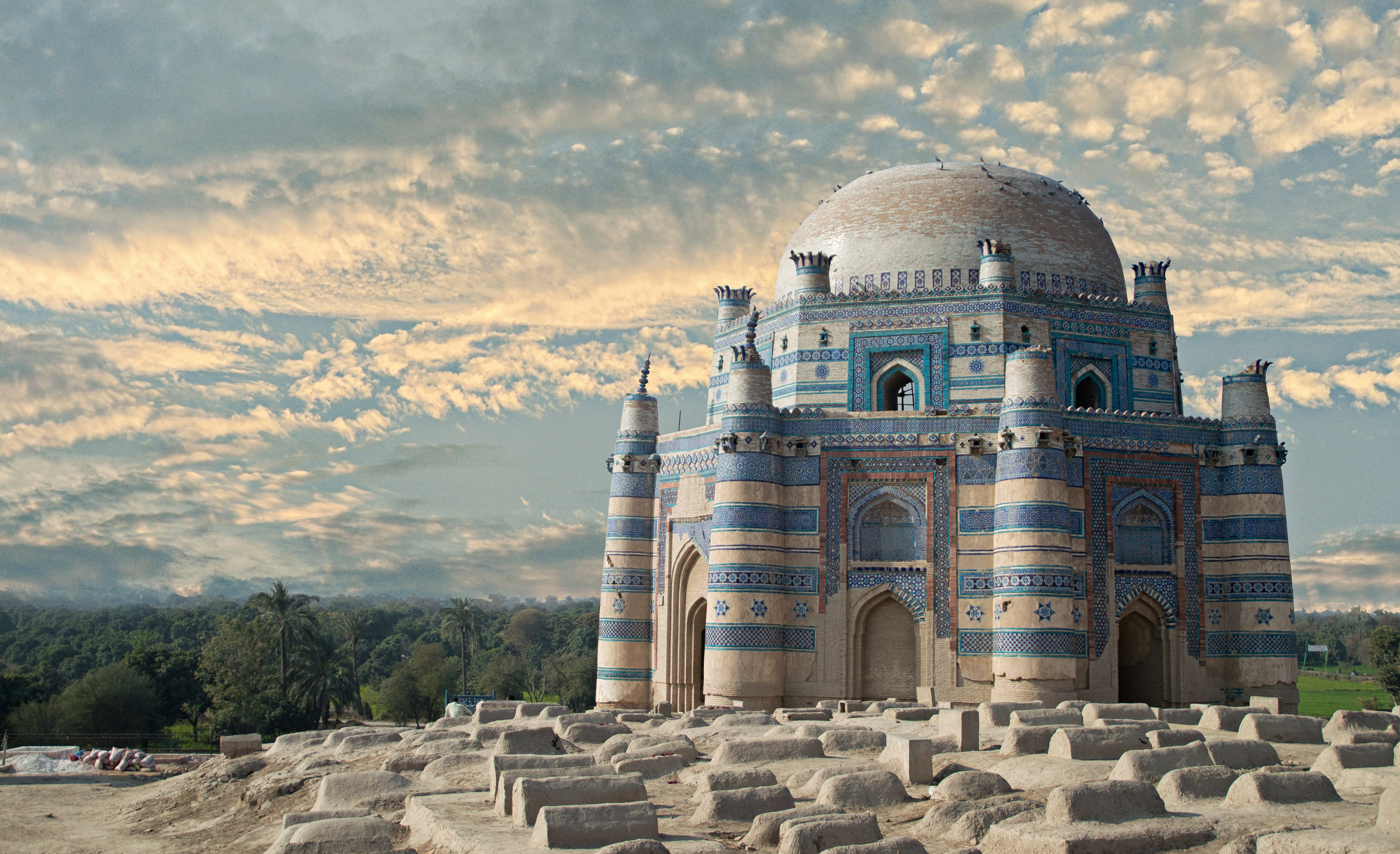
- Interactive map of Tomb of Bibi Jawindi
- Location: Uch, Punjab, Pakistan
- Coordinates: 29.24086°N 71.05244°E
- Type: Sufi shrine and Mausoleum

The tomb of Bibi Jawindi (Urdu: مقبرہ بی بی جیوندی) is one of the five monuments in Uch Sharif, Punjab, Pakistan, that are on the tentative list of the UNESCO World Heritage Sites. Dating back to the 15th century, the shrine was built in the spirit of the historical Sufi premier Bibi Jawindi of the Suhrawardiyyah order, a strictly hegemonistic Sunni school of theosophical thought which puts particular emphasis on the Shafi’i school of classical jurisprudence in the context of its interpretation of the Sharia. Bibi Jawindi was great-granddaughter to Jahaniyan Jahangasht, a famous Sufi saint in his own right.

== Location ==
The site is located in the south-west corner of Uch, a historical city founded by Alexander the Great, in the Bahawalpr state and Punjab province of Pakistan. Uch, locally known as Uch Sharif, is known as the home of the "shrine culture" because of its cultural significance and the presence of several monuments and shrines.

== Architecture ==
Built of glazed bricks on an octagonal base with turrets on each of its eight corners, the tomb of Bibi Jawindi is considered one of the most ornate monuments in Uch. The exterior of the building has three tiers with the top one supporting a dome, while the interior is circular due to thick angled walls rising up two stories. Both the interior and exterior of the building are richly decorated with Islamic scriptures, carved timber, and bright blue and glazed white mosaic tiles. The base tier is supported by the eight tapering turrets in each corner. The compound enclosing the shrine is preserved in its original desert-like conditions and is mostly covered with cemented graves. The surrounding area is covered with green vegetation due to a network of river tributaries and canals crossing the area.

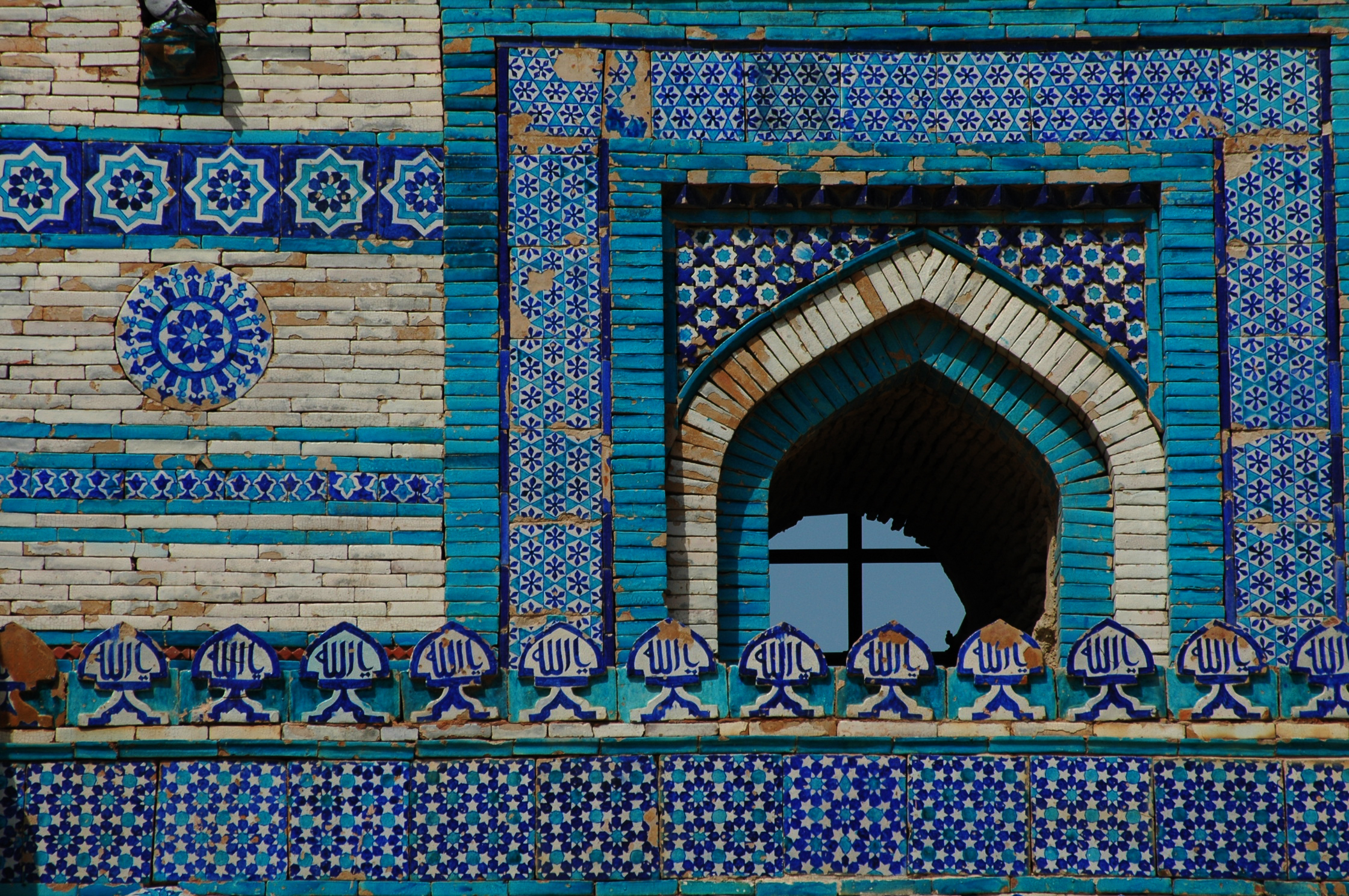
Close up of Tomb of Bibi Jawindi tilework

== World Heritage Site ==
The site was submitted by the Department of Archaeology and Museums Pakistan in January 2004 to be inducted in the World Heritage Sites along with four other monuments in the region. These monuments are the Shrine of Baha'al-Halim, Tomb of Ustead (the architect), Shrine of Jalaluddin Bukhari, and the Mosque of Jalaluddin Bukhari. The site was submitted under the criteria ii, iv, and vi in the cultural category. As of April 2019, it is still on the tentative list.

== Conservation ==
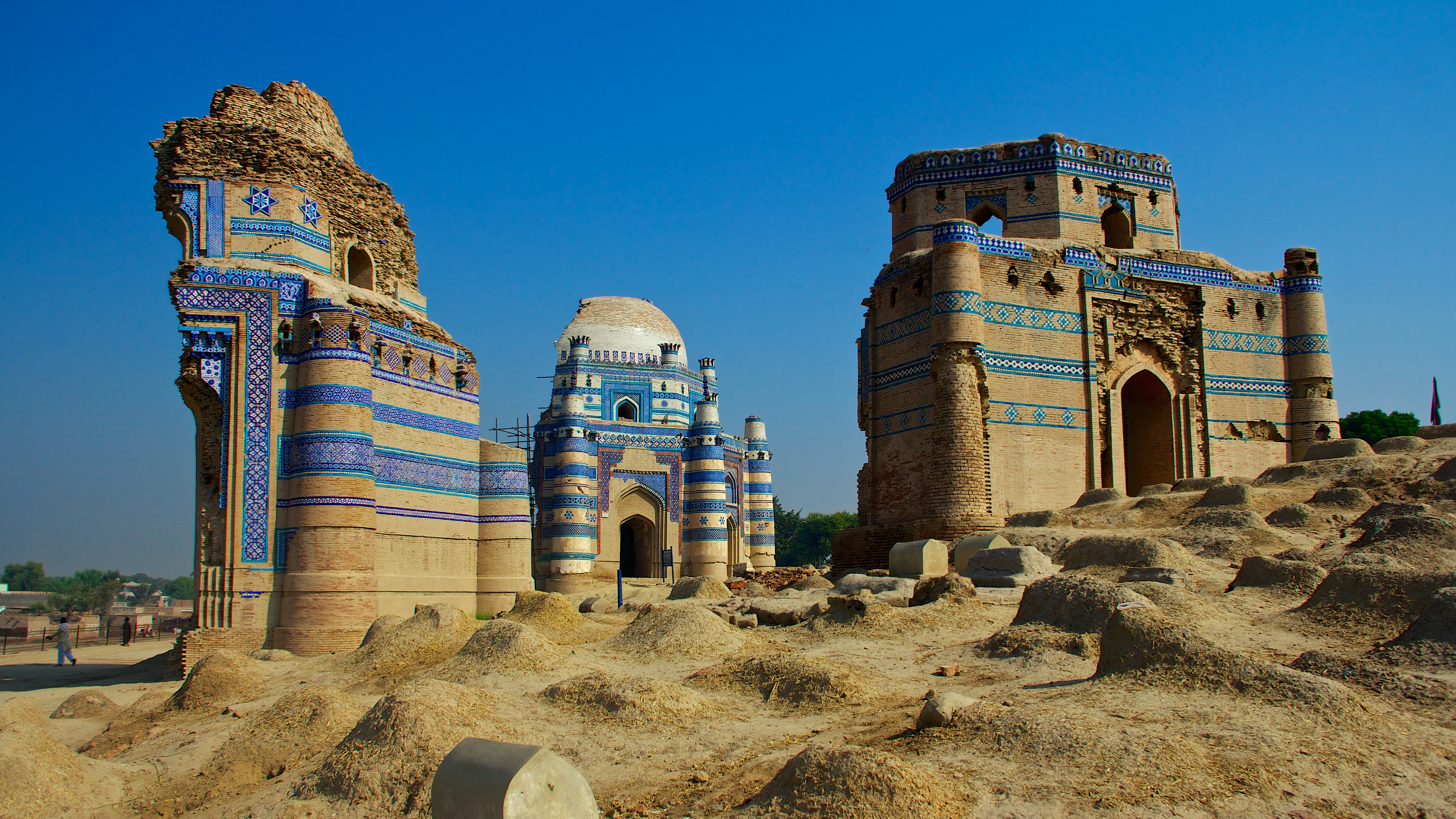
Photograph showing the damage to the tomb

Over the centuries, the tomb has badly disintegrated as a result of environmental conditions, and during torrential floods in 1817 half of the structure was washed away. Only half of the structure remains today. In 1999, the Conservation and Rehabilitation Center of Pakistan invited international bodies and city officials to work on the conservation of the site. However, because of humidity, salt infiltration, and erosion the complex monuments are still crumbling. Inappropriate methods of repair have further damaged the complex. The World Monuments Fund placed the structure on their Watch in 1998, 2000, and 2002 to gather international attention and obtained grants to conserve the tombs.

== Gallery ==
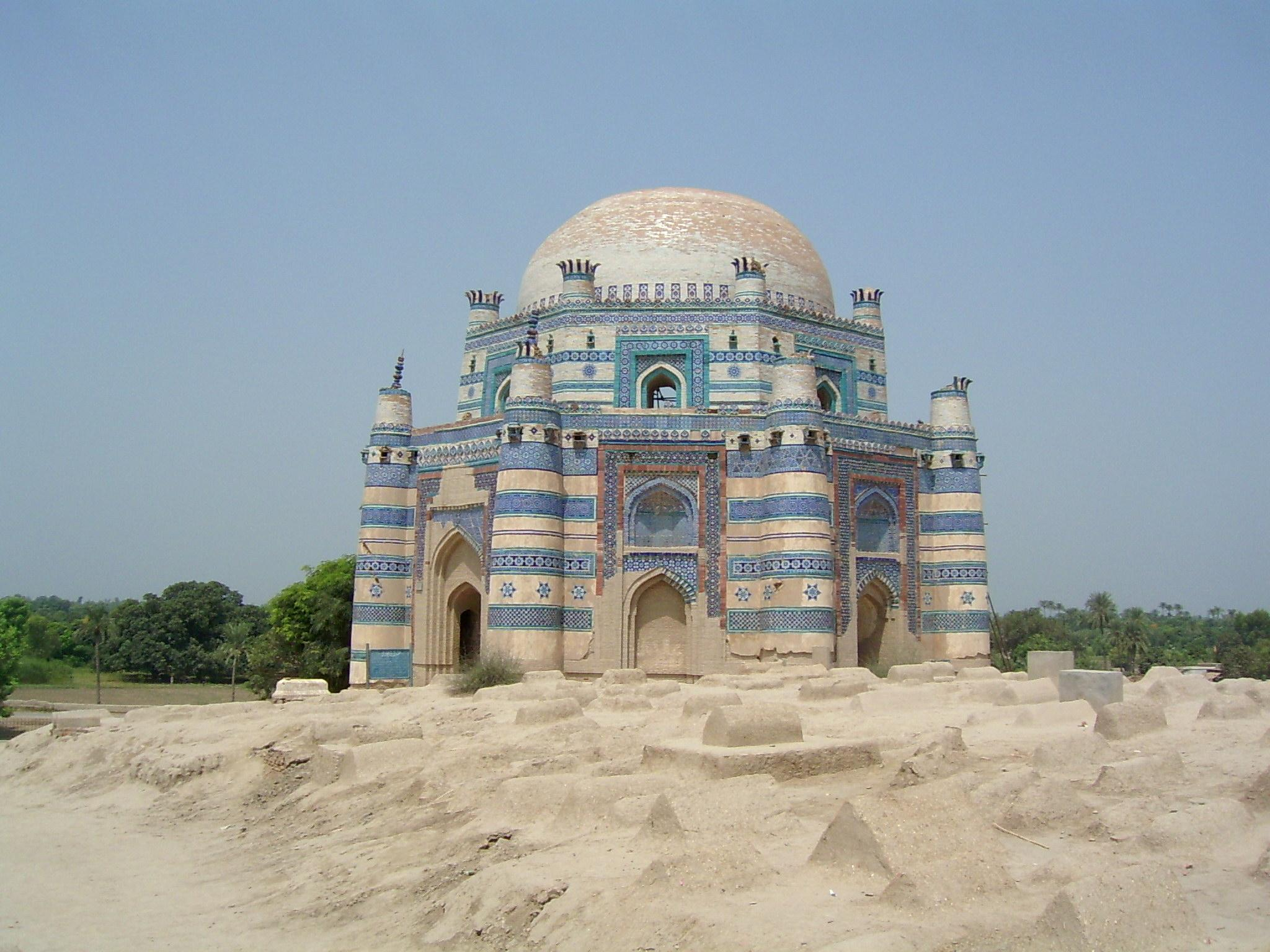
A view of the graves in the tomb enclosure with surrounding vegetation

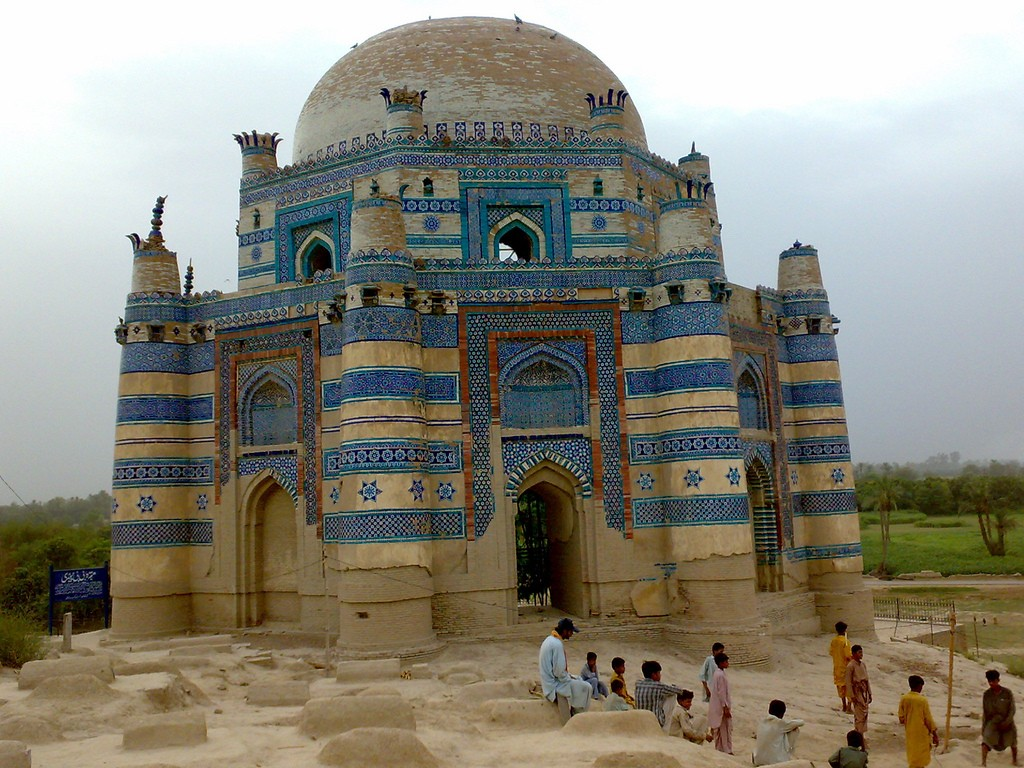
Close up view of the mosaic tiles decorating the mausoleum

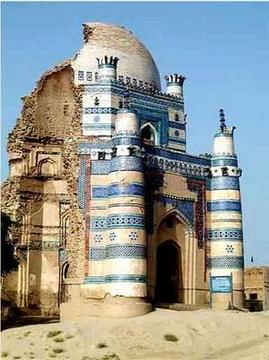
Side view of the tomb showing only half the structure is still standing

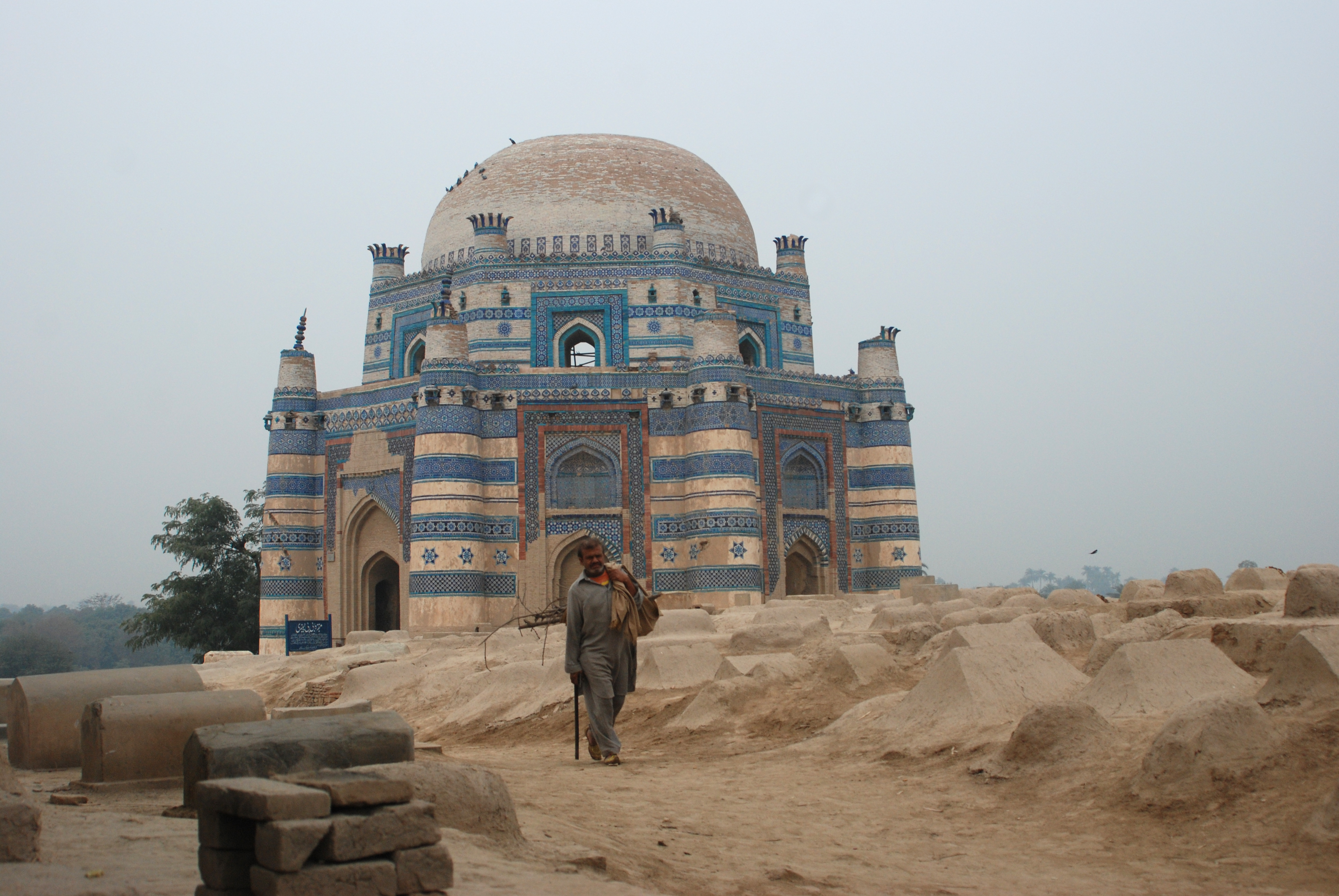
Tomb of Bibi Jawindi, 2013

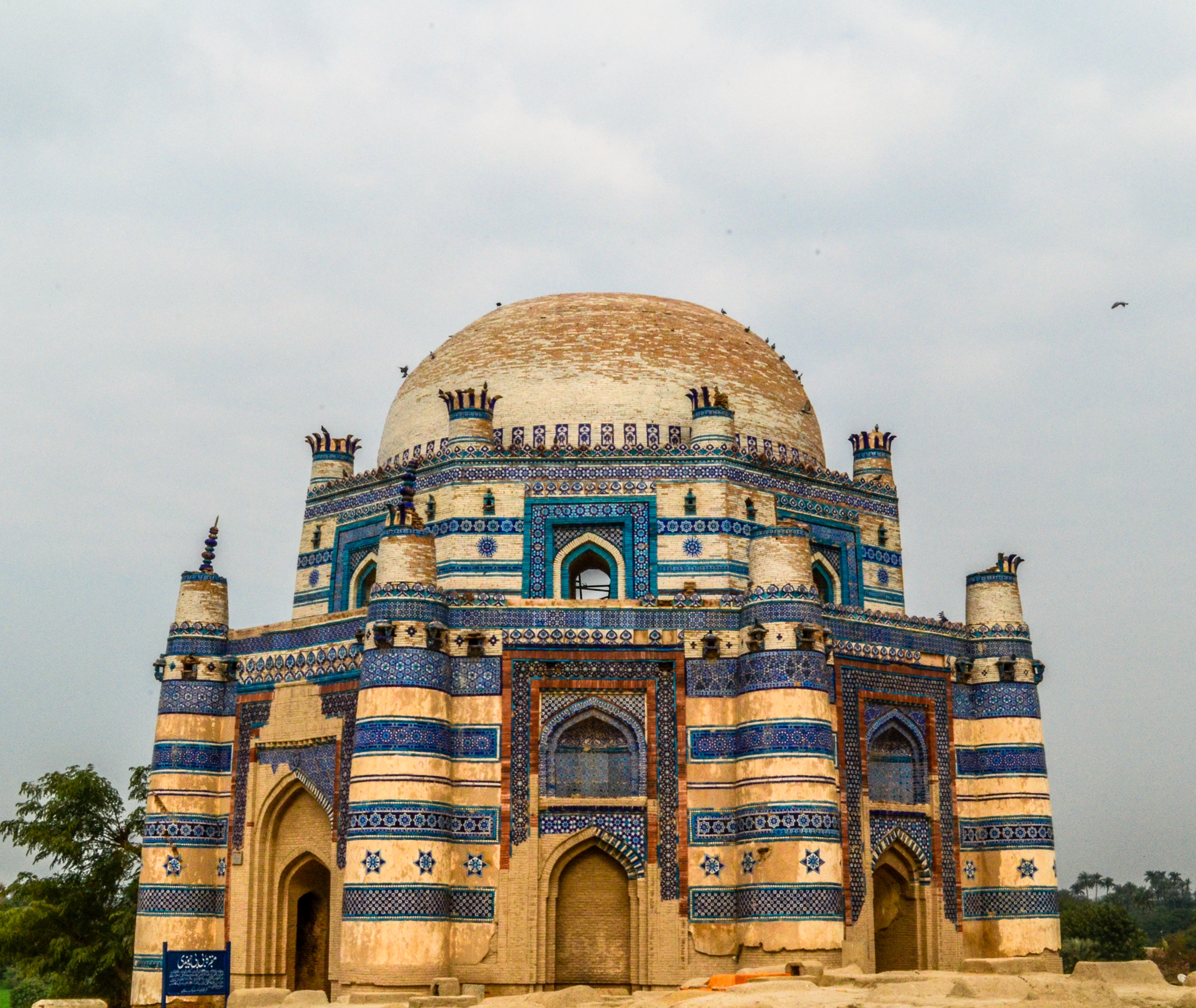
Front wall of the tomb

== See also ==
- List of World Heritage Sites in Pakistan
