= List of national monuments of Pakistan =

Following are the monuments of national importance of Pakistan, declared or constructed as such:

Name	Location	Description	Image	Reference
Tomb of Allama Iqbal	Lahore, Punjab	Mausoleum of Allama Iqbal, the national poet of Pakistan. Built in 1951.		
Wazir Mansion	Karachi, Sindh	Birthplace of Muhammad Ali Jinnah, the founder of Pakistan. Declared in 1953.		
Minar-e-Pakistan	Lahore, Punjab	Built in 1968 to commemorate the site where the Lahore Resolution was passed.		
Mazar-e-Quaid	Karachi, Sindh	Mausoleum of Muhammad Ali Jinnah. Built in 1971.		
Ziarat Residency	Ziarat, Balochistan	Last residency of Muhammad Ali Jinnah. Declared in 1975.		
Allama Iqbal Museum	Lahore, Punjab	House of Allama Iqbal. Declared in 1977.		
House of Abdus Salam	Jhang, Punjab	House of Abdus Salam, Pakistan's first Nobel laureate in Physics. Declared in 1981.		
Quaid-e-Azam House Museum	Karachi, Sindh	House of Muhammad Ali Jinnah. Declared in 1985.		
Faisal Mosque	Islamabad, Pakistan	National mosque of Pakistan. Built in 1986.		
Pakistan Monument	Islamabad	Built in 2007 as the national monument.		
