= Tando Jahania =

Coordinates: 25°24′N 68°21′E

Tando Jahania (Sindh-ٹنڈوجهانياں) is a small quarter in the city of Hyderabad, the second largest city of Sindh province in Pakistan.

The quarter is inhabited predominantly by Shias, including many who claim descent from Jahaniyan Jahangasht.
