= Qadam Sharif (Delhi) =

Shrine in Delhi

Dargah Qadam Sharif
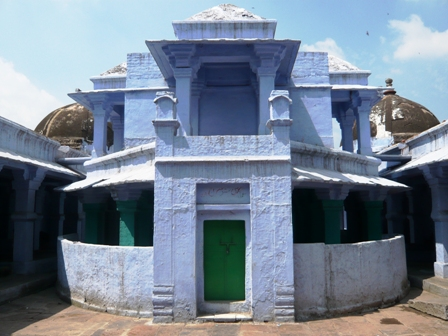
- Inner Tomb Complex

- Location within Delhi

Religion
- Affiliation: Islam
- Status: Active

Location
- Location: India
- State: Delhi
- Coordinates: 28.6498°N 77.2119°E

Architecture
- Completed: 1376

Specifications
- Dome: 4
- Materials: Rubble Masonry

The Dargah Qadam Sharif in Paharganj, Delhi consists of a small tomb complex, built in 1375–1376 CE, which also houses a mosque, a madrasa and a shrine ("dargah"), which is surrounded by a massive gated wall.

== History ==
Originally, Firuz Shah Tughlaq (1309–1388) constructed the large rectangular tomb at its core for himself, and surrounded it with massive walls and impressive gates in typical Tughlaq style. However, when his son Fateh Khan died in 1376, he repurposed the tomb to be used for his son. Also added was a stone with a foot print of Muhammad, which Jahaniyan Jahangasht, the spiritual guide of Firuz Shah had brought in from Mecca. This foot print ("Qadam Sharif" = "Footprint of the Prophet" in English) gave the whole complex its name, Dargah Qadam Sharif. A mosque and a madrasa round out the inner tomb complex.

In the centuries since then, the whole area has been "absorbed" by housing and commercial buildings, although the tomb, most of the walls as well as a couple of the gate houses are still clearly visible. Furthermore, the madrasa and mosque at the tomb are still actively used, and the foot print is an important pilgrimage site.

The complex is located just northwest of the New Delhi Railway Station in a dense "urban jungle." Since most of the maps (including the Eicher city map) are highly inaccurate, one should use the map included in Peck's book to explore the area.

Nearby (and barely noticeable as a U-shaped building) are the remains of one of the glorious Seven Mosques of Firoz Shah's Wazir Khan-i-Jahan Maqbul Tilangani (Khan Jahan).

The exact coordinates for the tomb are (28.649818,77.211879) and the U-shaped building are (28.649328,77.217689).

On a side note, Firuz Shah Tughlaq's final resting place was in a new tomb in Hauz Khas.

A watercolour of the tomb complex from 1823 from the British library (http://www.bl.uk/onlinegallery/onlineex/apac/addorimss/q/019addor0000547u00000000.html).
