= Sami Ullah Khan =

Pakistani politician

Member of the Provincial Assembly of the Punjab
- Incumbent
- Assumed office 15 August 2018
- Constituency: PP-144 Lahore-I
- In office 25 November 2002 – 25 November 2007

Personal details
- Born: 17 October 1960 (age 66) Lahore, Punjab, Pakistan
- Party: PMLN (2013–present)
- Other political affiliations: PPP (2007-2013)
- Spouse: Azma Zahid Bukhari

Sami Ullah Khan is a Pakistani politician who had been a member of Provincial Assembly of the Punjab from August 2018 till January 2023, having again in this post since 23 February 2024.

Previously, he served as Member of the Provincial Assembly of Punjab from November 2002 to 2007.

== Early life and education ==
He was born on 17 October 1960 in Lahore, Pakistan.

He graduated in 1999 and received a degree of Bachelor of Arts from the University of the Punjab.

== Political career ==
He was elected to the Provincial Assembly of the Punjab as a candidate of Pakistan Peoples Party (PPP) from Constituency PP-144 (Lahore-I) in the 2002 Pakistani general election.

He was re-elected to the Provincial Assembly of the Punjab as a candidate of Pakistan Muslim League (N) from Constituency PP-144 (Lahore-I) in the 2018 Pakistani general election.
