= Makhdoom Rashid =

Makhdoom Rasheed
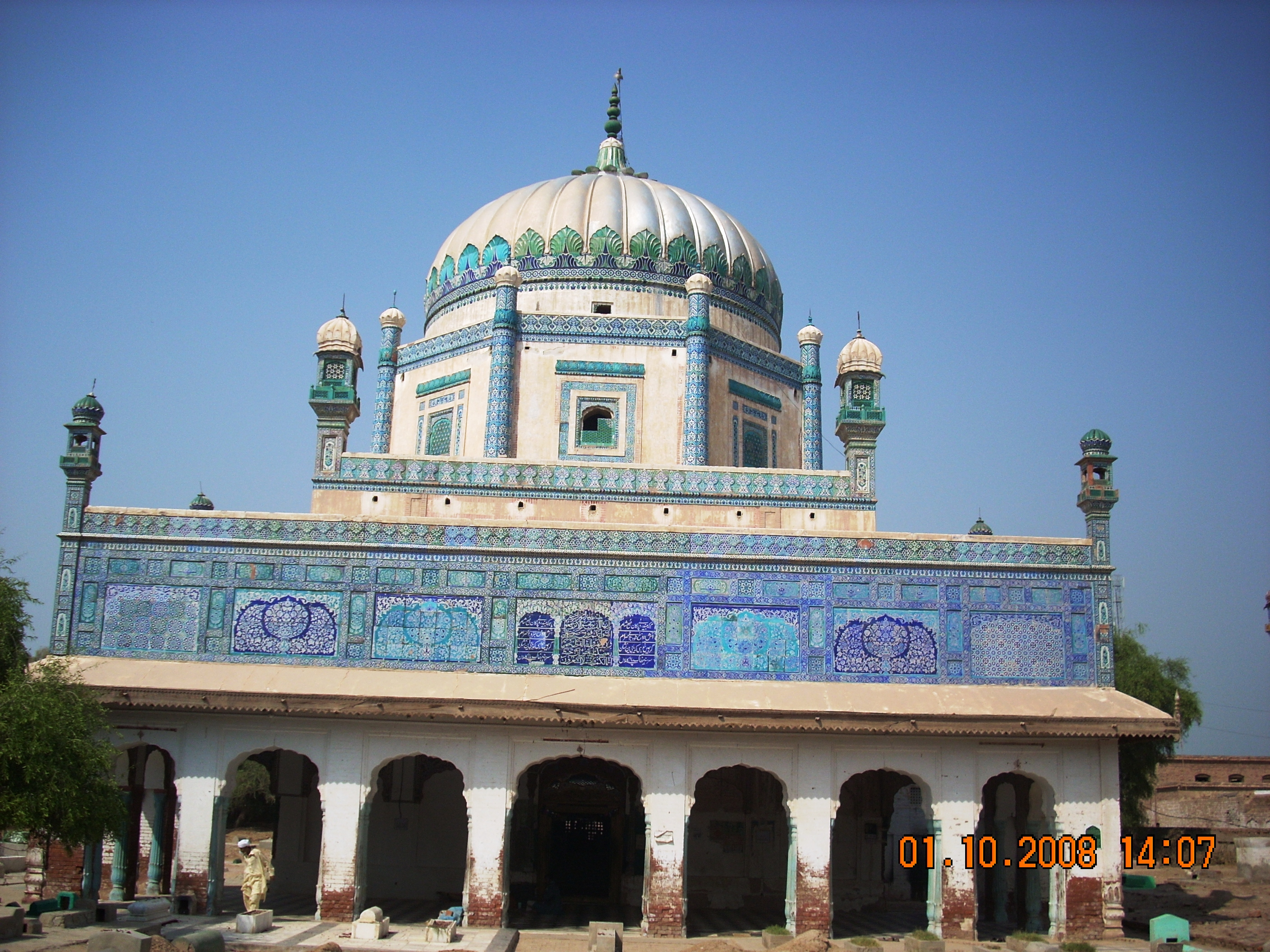

- Location in Pakistan
- Coordinates: 30°05′11.65″N 71°39′15.65″E
- Country: Pakistan
- Province: Punjab
- District: Multan

Population (2023)
  - Total: 16,418
- Time zone: UTC+5 (PST)

Makhdoom Rashid (Urdu: مخدُوم رشِيد), (Punjabi: مخدوم رشِید) is a town in Multan, Punjab, Pakistan.

Makhdoom Rashid is 20 km from Multan towards the east on Vehari Road (old Multan Dehli Road).

== Makhdoom Abdul Rashid Haqqani ==
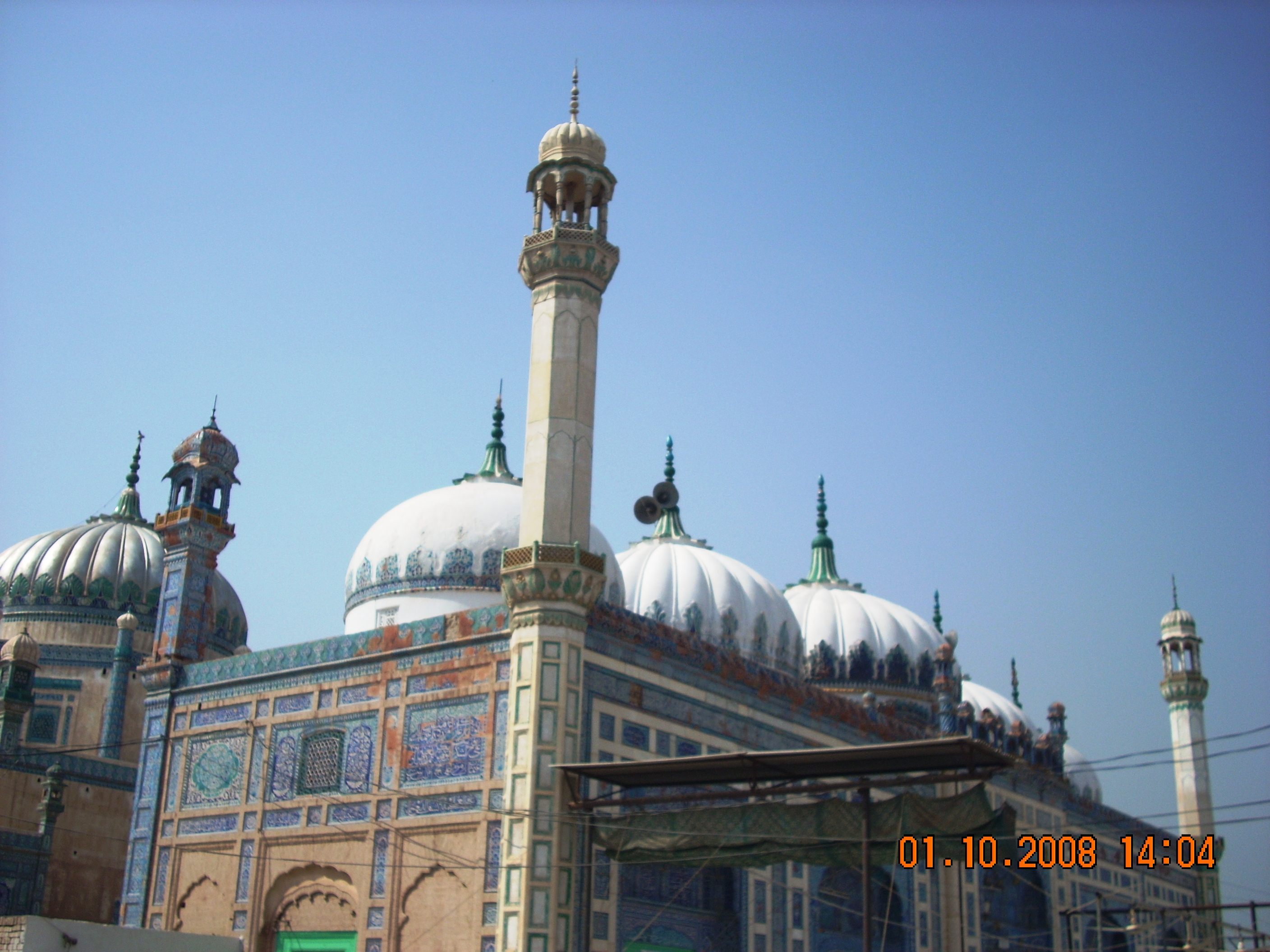
Mosque in Makhdoom Rashid

The town is named after the Sufi saint Makhdoom Abdul Rashid Haqqani who founded this town in the 11th century. Makhdoom Abdul Rashid Haqqani was born in 669 Hijri and died in 773 Hijri. His father's name was Makhdoom Kabeer-ud-Din Ahmad Ghous, from Banu Hashim tribe. He was an elder first cousin and brother-in-law of Baha-ud-din Zakariya. He was a disciple of Mir Sayyid Ali Hamadani, a Sufi saint buried in Khatlan, Tajikistan. Haqqani's urs festival is held throughout the month of 'Harh' (June) and attracts pilgrims from other areas. A well near the mausoleum is said to produce water only during the month of Haar. It is believed that its water cures physical and spiritual diseases. The origin of this belief is a story that Haqqani suffered from disease and after recovering threw the remaining medicine into the well.

The mausoleum and adjacent five-dome mosque, reportedly one of two mosques of its type in the world, displays the finest Multani "Blue Pottery" art.

== Demographics ==
=== Population ===
Historical population
Year	Pop.	±% p.a.
1951	...	—
1961	...	—
1972	...	—
1981	...	—
1998	10,216	—
2017	14,818	+1.98%
2023	16,418	+1.72%

As of the 2023 census, Makhdoom Rashid had a population of 16,418.

== Notables ==
Allama Abu Al-Khair Asadi was a Sunni Hanfi Islamic poet, philosopher and Muslim scholar. He wrote more than 150 books about Islam. He was the founder of Islamic organization (ادارہ اسلامیہ مخدوم رشید).
