= Shrine of Nuriya =

Monument in Uch, Pakistan

- مقبرہ نوریا
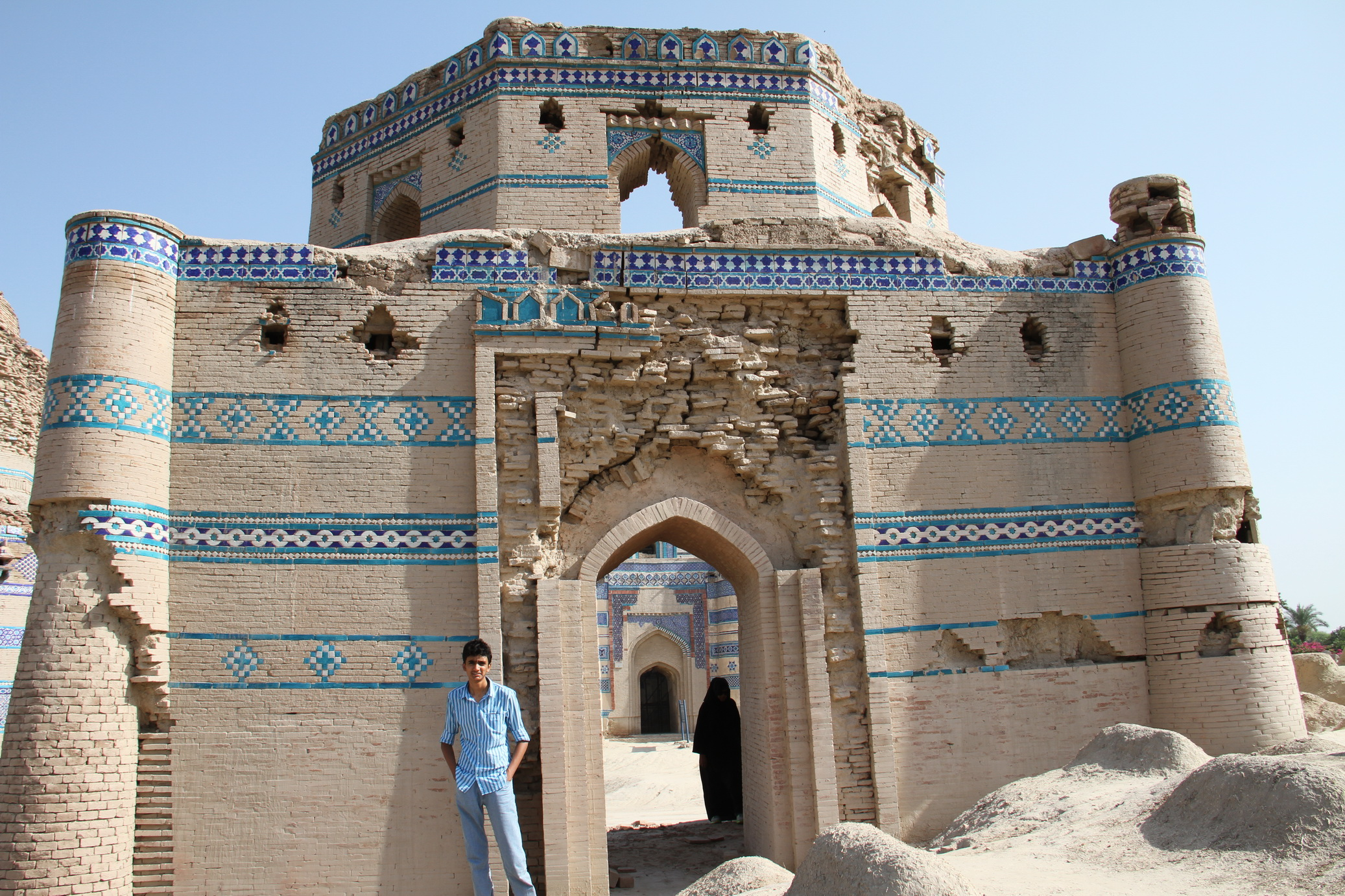
- Interactive map of Shrine of Nuriya
- Location: Uch, Punjab, Pakistan
- Type: Sufi shrine and Mausoleum

Shrine of Nuriya (Urdu: مقبرہ نوریا) is the shrine of Ustad Nuriya, an Islamic saint. It is located in Uch in present-day Punjab, Pakistan. It is one of the five monuments in Uch Sharif, Pakistan which are on the tentative list of the UNESCO World Heritage Sites.
