= Bahawalpur Central Library =

Public library in Bahawalpur

Bahawalpur Central Library کتابخانه مرکزی بھاولپور
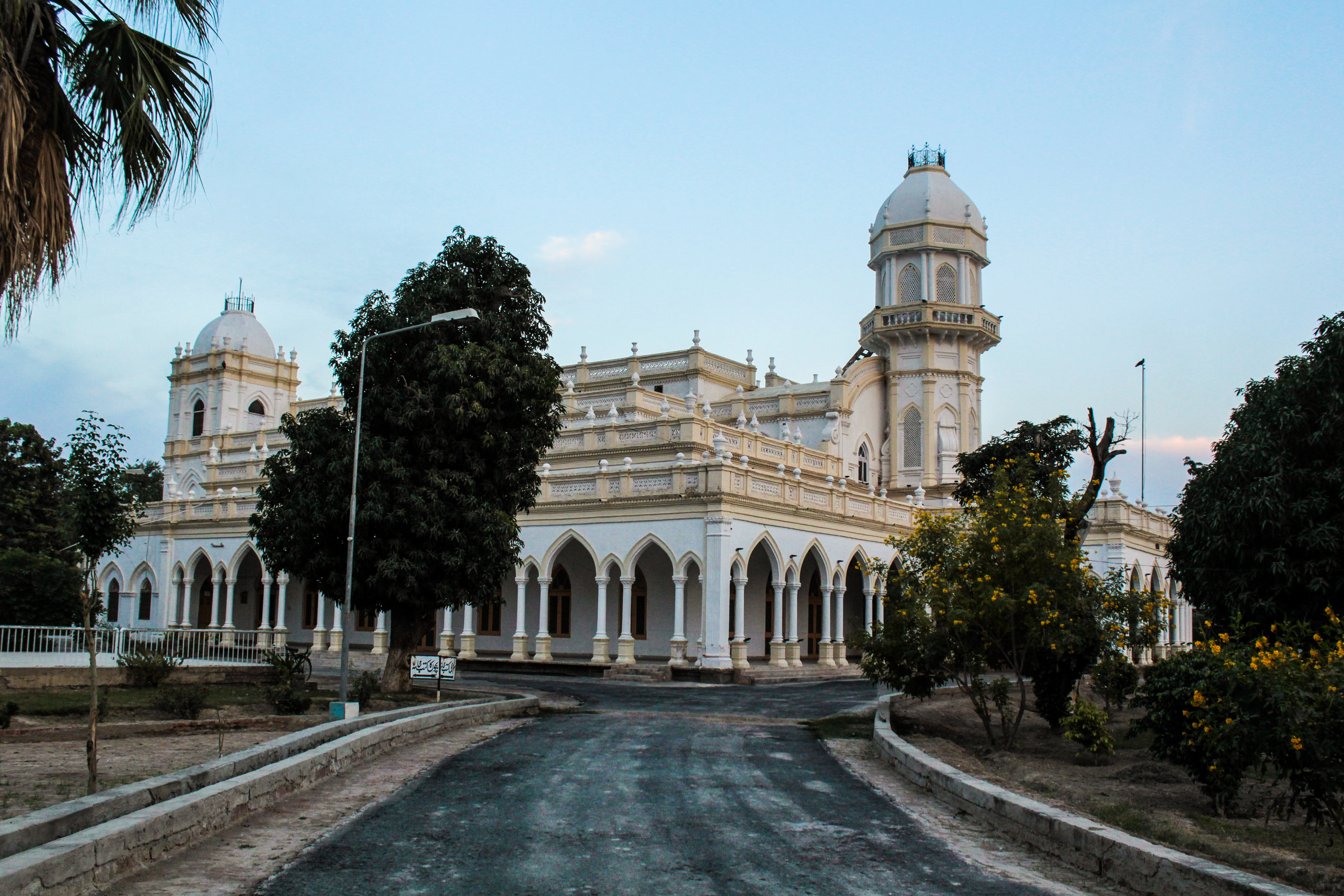
- Bahawalpur Central Library was built in 1924
- 29°23′28″N 71°41′06″E
- Location: Bahawalpur, Pakistan
- Type: Academic library
- Established: 1924; 102 years ago

The Bahawalpur Central Library (Urdu: کتابخانه مرکزی بھاولپور), also known as Sadiq Reading Library, is a public library in Bahawalpur, Punjab, Pakistan. It is the second largest library in the province of Punjab.

== History ==
It was founded on 8 March 1924 by Sir Rufus Daniel Issacs during the coronation year of Sadeq Mohammad Khan V. It was built at a cost of 100,000 rupees by Bahawalpur State.

== Architecture ==
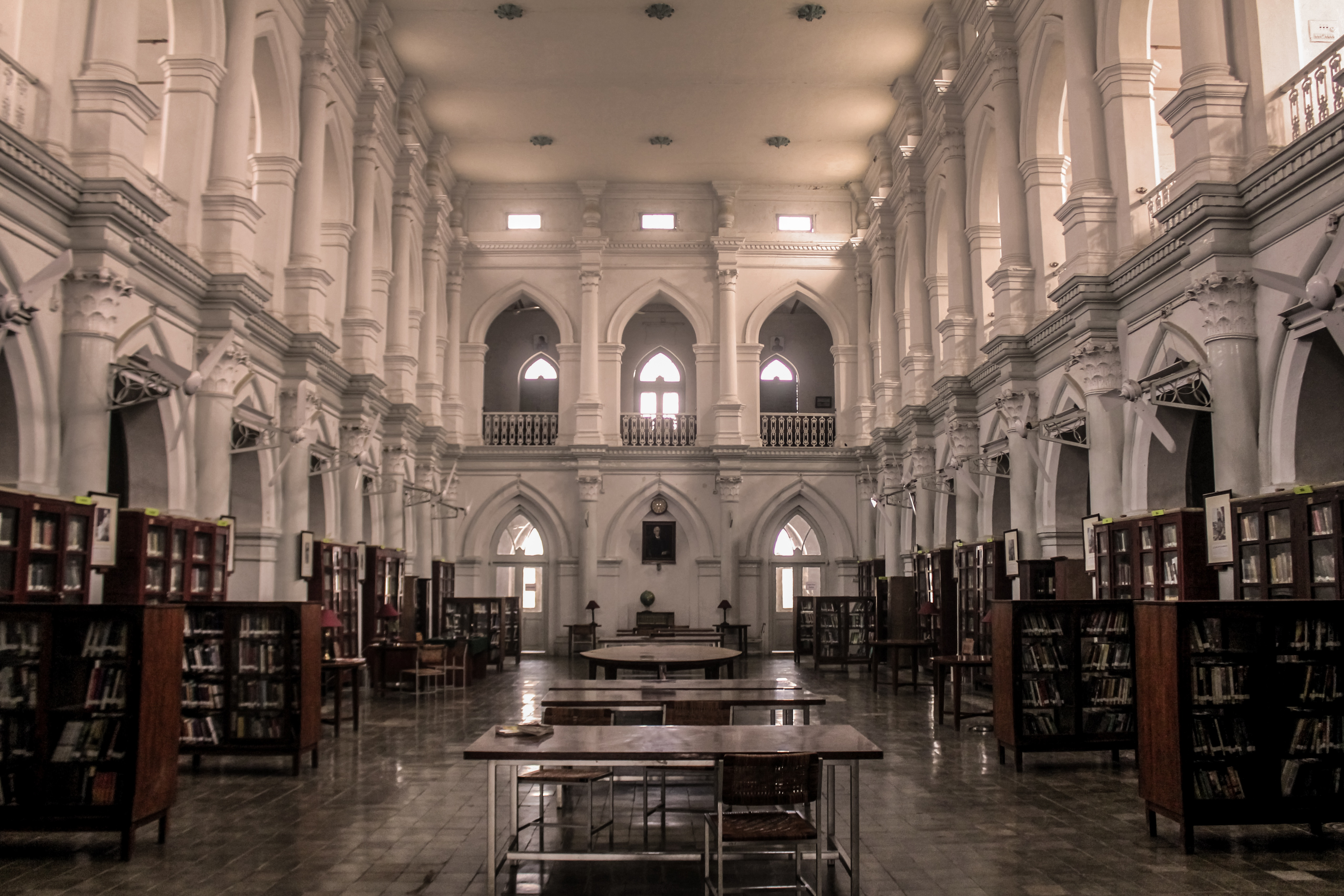
Interior of the library

The library is one of the buildings built by the Nawabs that was designed in a hybrid Neo-Gothic-Victorian style. Unlike other royal buildings, arches in the library are not multi-foiled, but are instead single-foiled.

A porch wraps around some of the building, and has an octagonal tower with Jali work on its arches, and stylized Victorian scrolls at its base.

== Collections ==
The library is divided into three sections: Main Hall, children's books section and audio visual archive section.

The library's collection includes older editions of newspapers. It has over 100,000 books, and contains a repository of historic documents related to the state of Bahawalpur and Khwaja Ghulam Farid.
