= Sialkot Cathedral =

Cathedral in Sialkot, Pakistan

Holy Trinity Cathedral Church
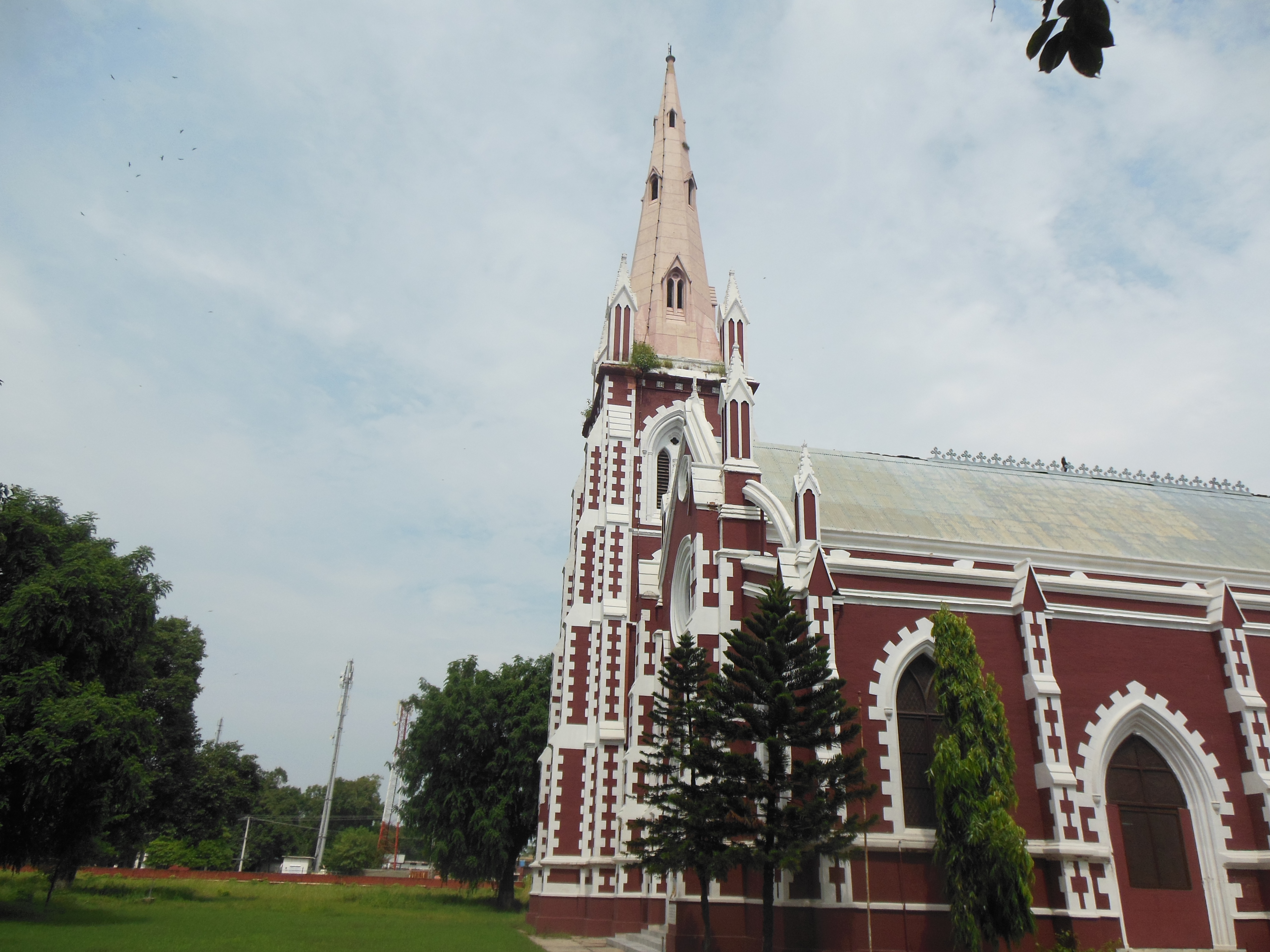
- Front view of the cathedral
- Holy Trinity Cathedral Church
- 32°31′12″N 74°33′51″E
- Location: The Mall, Sialkot Cantonment, Sialkot, Punjab, Pakistan
- Country: Pakistan
- Denomination: Church of Pakistan

History
- Status: Cathedral
- Founded: 1 March 1852
- Consecrated: 30 January 1857

Architecture
- Functional status: Active
- Architect: Hartley Maxwell
- Architectural type: Cathedral
- Style: Gothic Revival
- Groundbreaking: 1852
- Completed: 1857

Administration
- Province: Church of Pakistan
- Diocese: Diocese of Sialkot

The Holy Trinity Cathedral Church, also known as Sialkot Cathedral, is an Anglican cathedral located in Sialkot (Punjab), Pakistan. It is located in the Sialkot Cantonment on The Mall (Quaid-i-Azam Road).

== History ==
Its first stone was laid on March 1, 1852. The church was consecrated by the Rt. Rev Daniel Wilson, Bishop of Calcutta, on January 30, 1857, Sialkot, at the time being in the Diocese of Calcutta. It now belongs to the Church of Pakistan Diocese of Sialkot.
