= Al-Sadiq Mosque, Bahawalpur =

Mosque in Bahawalpur, Punjab, Pakistan

Al-Sadiq Mosque
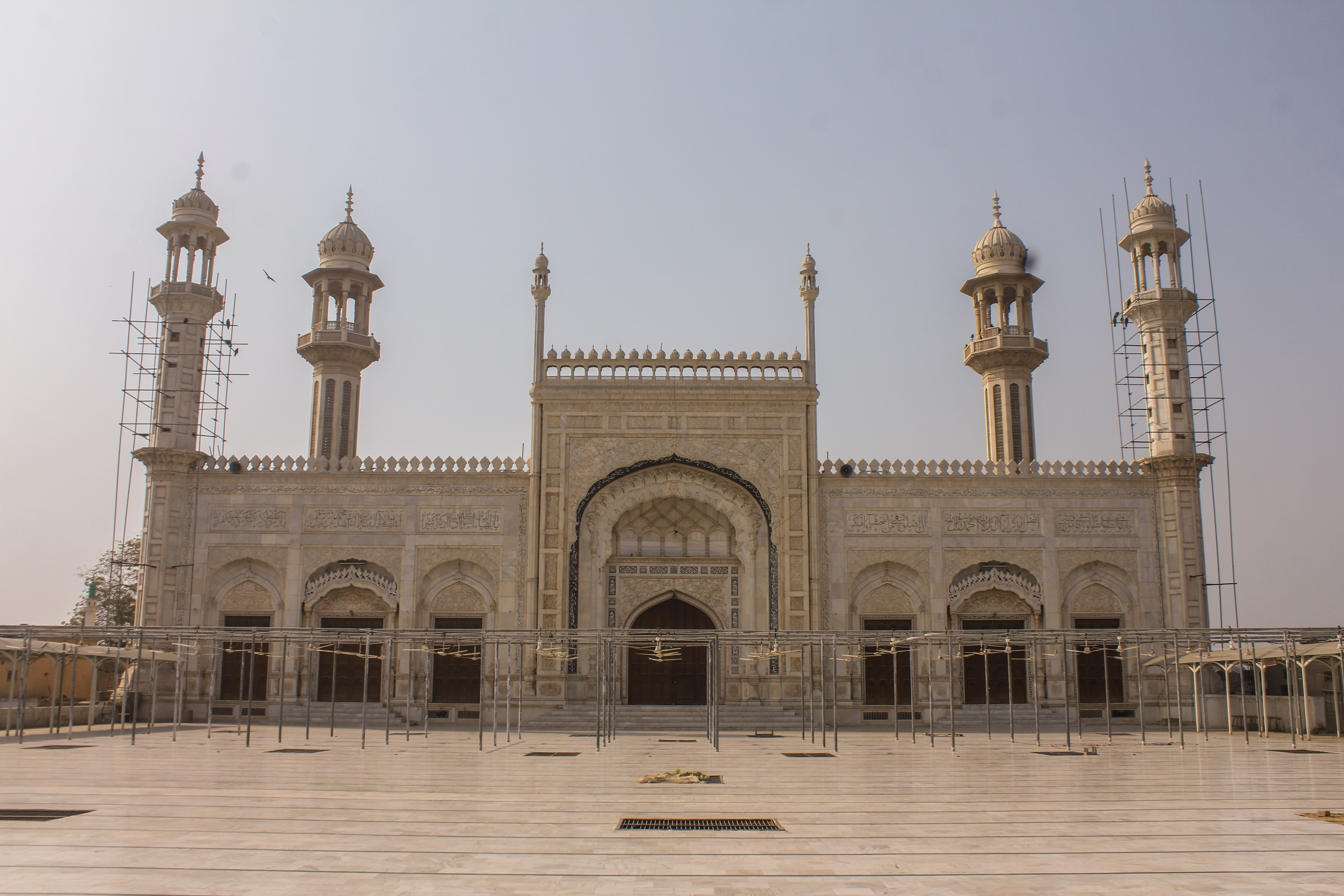

Religion
- Affiliation: Islam
- Branch/tradition: Sunni

Location
- Location: Bahawalpur, Punjab, Pakistan
- Interactive map of Al-Sadiq Mosque

Architecture
- Type: Mosque
- Capacity: 60,000 worshipers

Al-Sadiq Mosque is the principal congregational mosque of Bahawalpur, Punjab, Pakistan.

Nearly 60,000 people can pray in the mosque at a time. The mosque covers an area of 24 kanal.

== History ==
According to the regional archaeological handbook produced for the Government of Punjab, Khawaja Noor Muhammad Maharvi, spiritual mentor to the Abbasi rulers, laid the foundation of the mosque more than 200 years ago as an important devotional nucleus for the emerging princely capital. Construction and embellishment were taken up again in the late nineteenth and early twentieth centuries under successive Nawabs of Bahawalpur, and a major rebuilding was commissioned by the last sovereign, Sir Sadiq Muhammad Khan Abbasi V after his return from the Hajj in 1935.

== See also ==
- List of mosques in Pakistan
- Islam in Pakistan
- Moorish Mosque, Kapurthala
