= Jahaniyan Jahangasht =

Indian Sufi saint (1308–1384)

Makhdum Jahaniyan Jahangasht Naqvi Al Bukhari
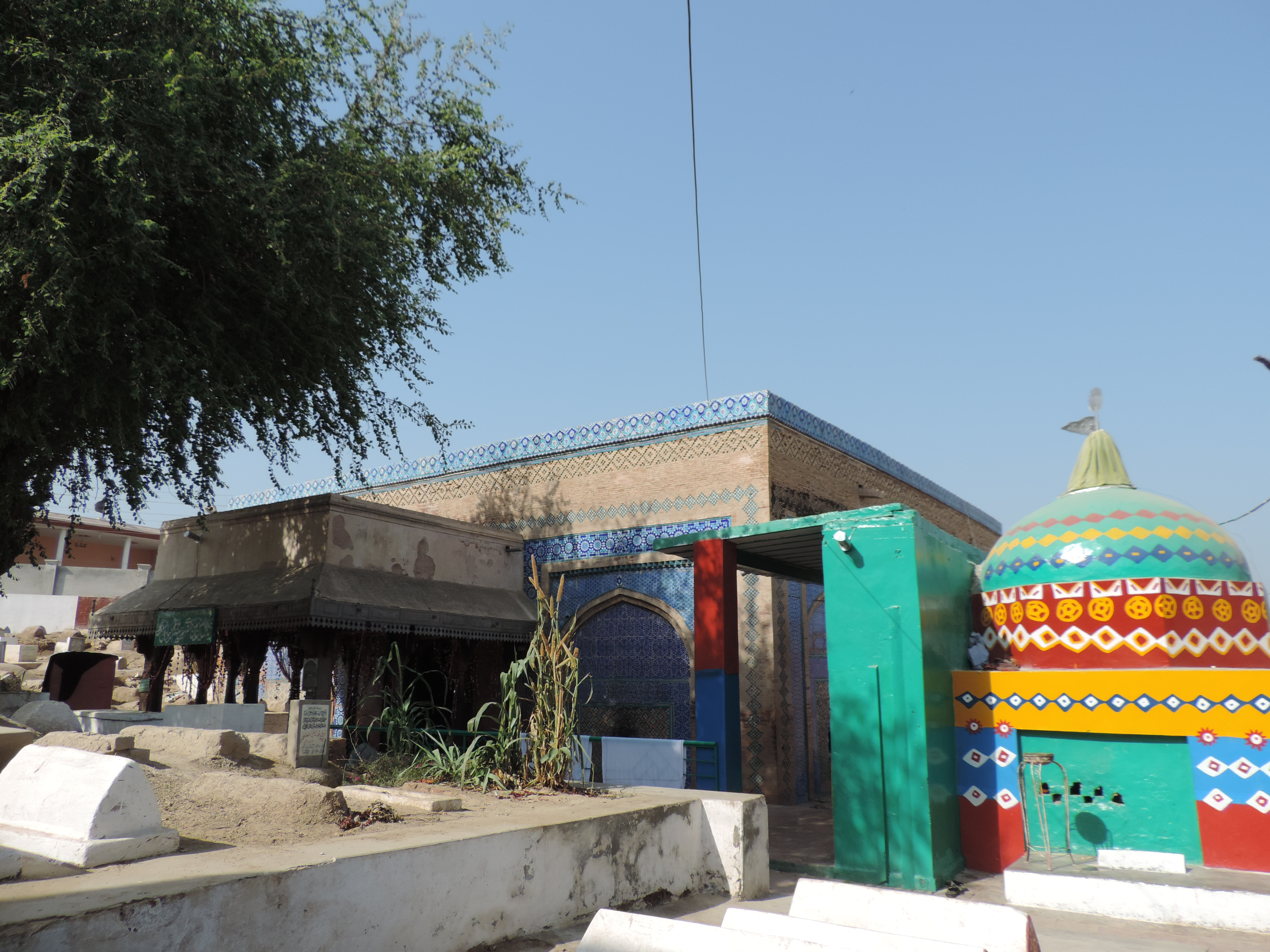

Personal life
- Born: Mir Sayyid Jalaluddin; 8 February 1308
- Died: 3 February 1384 (aged 76) Uch, Delhi Sultanate (near Bahawalpur in present-day Punjab, Pakistan)
- Relatives: Jalaluddin Surkh-Posh (grandfather); Shah Jewna (nephew)

Religious life
- Religion: Islam
- Denomination: Sunni
- Jurisprudence: Hanafi

Mīr Sayyid Makhdoom Jalāl ad-Dīn an-Naqwī al-Bukhārī / Naqvi Al Bukhari (Persian: میر سید جلال الدین النقوی البخاری; 1308-1384), better known as Jahāniyān Jahāngasht (Persian: مخدوم جہانیاں جہان گشت), was a Punjabi Muslim Sufi saint from South Asia.

== Biography ==
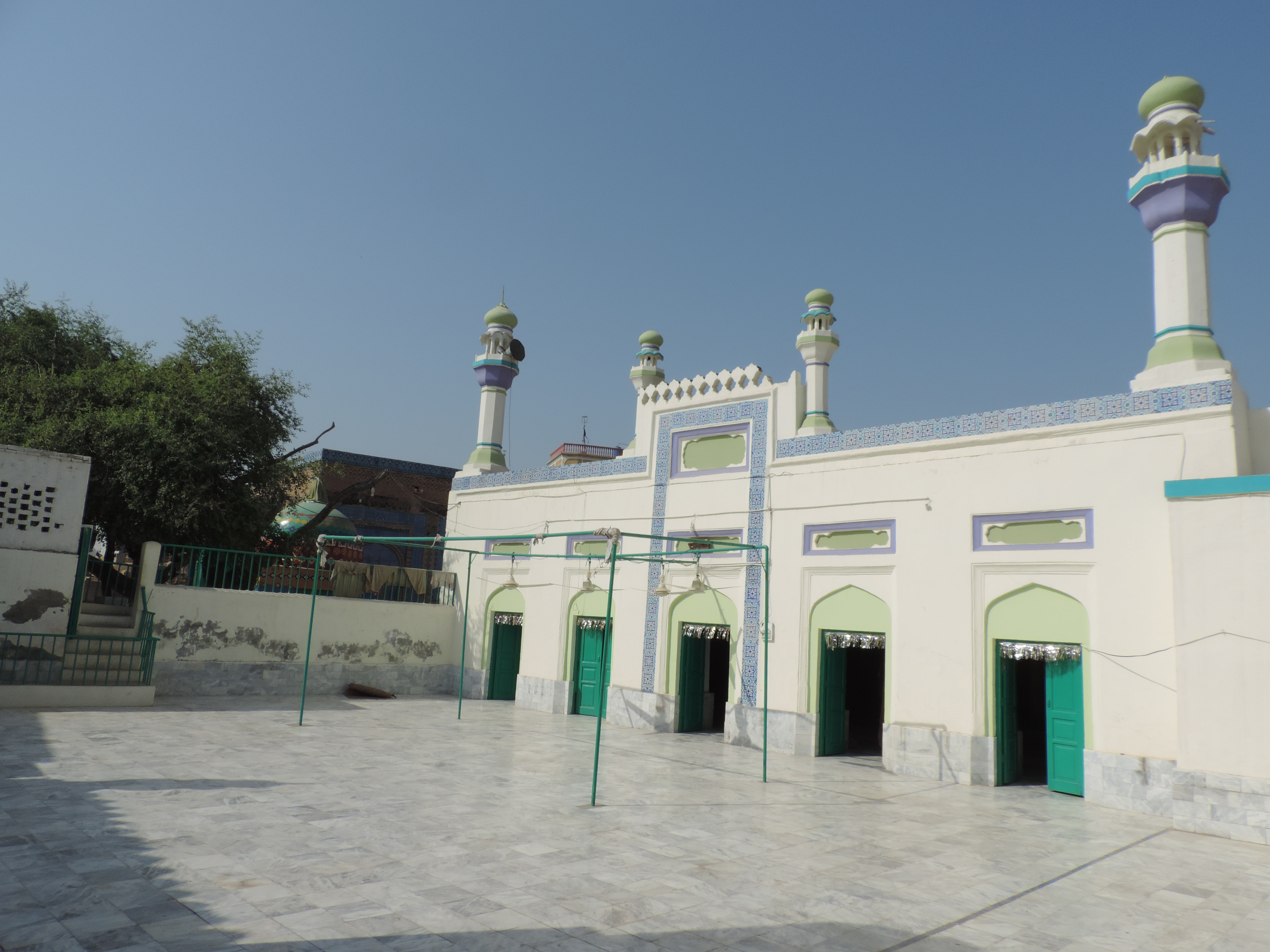
Jahangasht's mosque near his grave

Jahaniyan Jahangasht was born on 8 February 1308 AD (14 Shaban 707 AH) in Uch. His father, Sayyid Aḥmad Kabīr, was the youngest son and chosen successor of Jalaluddin Surkh-Posh of Bukhara.

He was later given the title of Jahaniyan Jahangasht from which he gained prominence. He travelled to many countries including Kāzarūn, Egypt, Syria-Palestine, Mesopotamia, Balkh, Buk̲h̲āra, K̲h̲urāsān, and visited Mecca 36 times in his life. He married the daughter of his half-uncle Sadruddin Muhammad Ghawth.

Muḥammad b. Tug̲h̲luq appointed Jalāl al-Dīn as S̲h̲ayk̲h̲ al-Islām and was granted forty k̲h̲ānaḳāhs in Sīwastān, but left for the Ḥajj. When he returned, he gifted Fīrūz S̲h̲āh Tug̲h̲luḳ with the Qadam Sharif, and Jalāl al-Dīn would visit Delhi periodically where the Sultan would pay him reverence. Jalāl al-Dīn also accompanied the king on his campaign to Ṭhaṭṭā and was a major influence on Fīrūz's religious policies.

He visited Hazrat Pandua, the first capital of the Bengal Sultanate, where he led the janazah of Alaul Haq Pandwi, the court scholar of Bengal. The Jhan Jhaniya Mosque of the 16th-century is said to be named in his honour. Every year, during the urs of Akhi Siraj Bengali, Jahangasht's jhanda is taken from Tabrizi's dargah to Akhi Siraj's mausoleum.

== Legacy ==
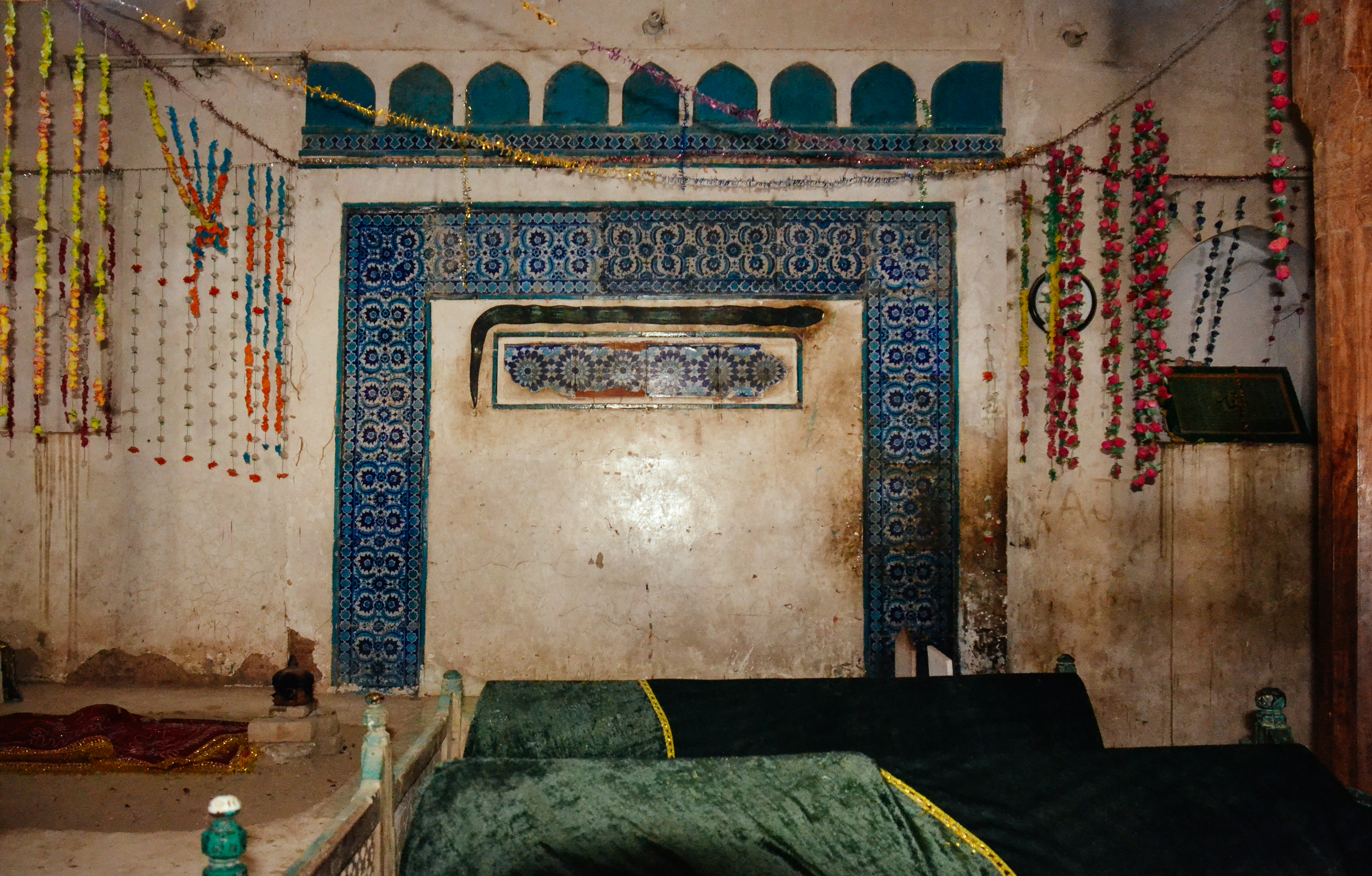
Shrine of Jahangasht

His descendants use the surname Naqvi Bukhari, and belong to the Naurang Jahania family Some of them migrated to Jalalpur Pirwala, Depalpur, Karmanwala and Tando Jahania in Sindh creating a sizeable community, whilst others migrated to many other places within the subcontinent.

== See also ==
- Tomb of Bibi Jawindi
- List of Sufis
