= Shrine of Jalaluddin Bukhari =

Pakistani shrine

- مقبرہ جلال الدین بخاری
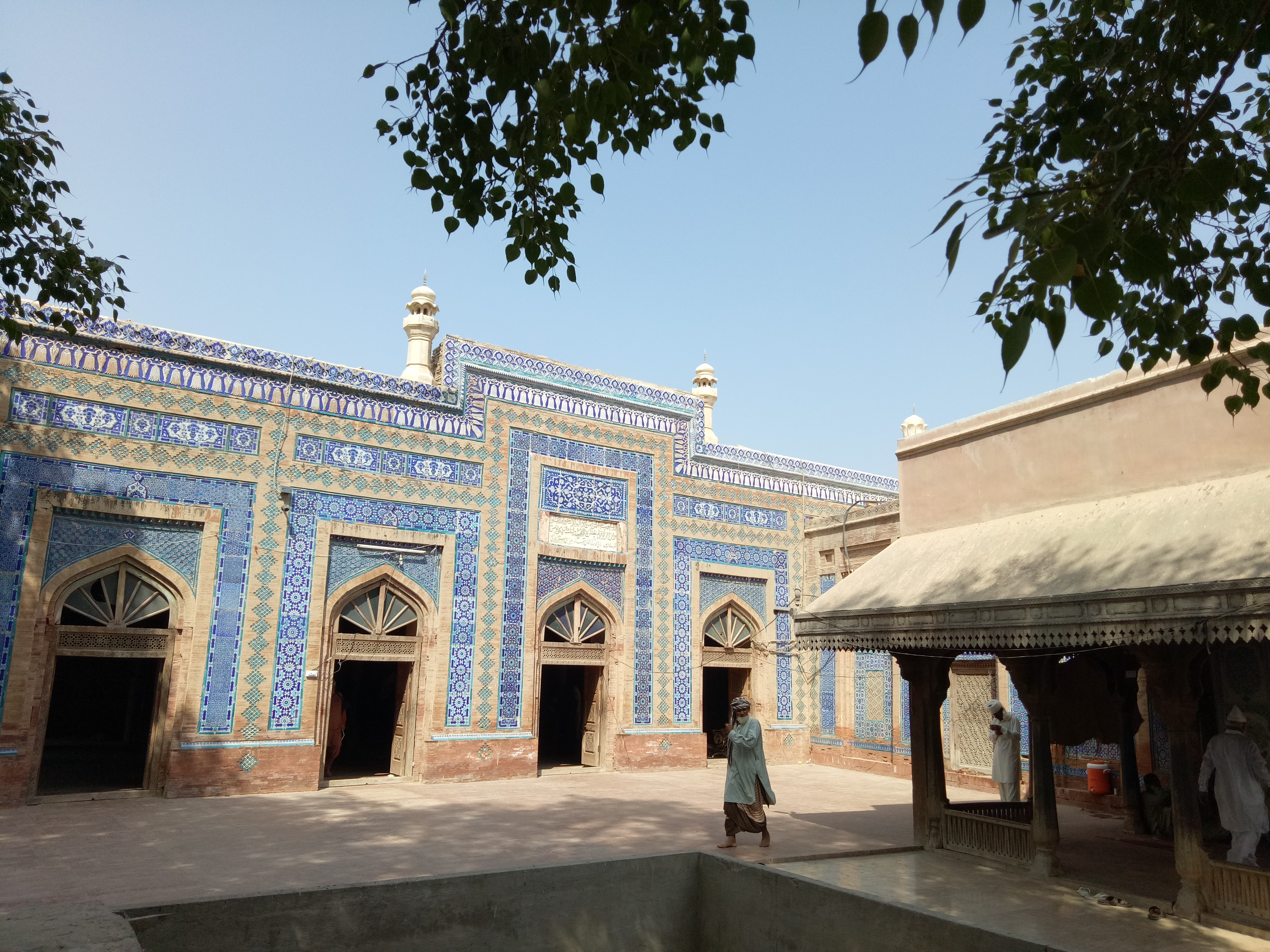
- Interactive map of Shrine of Jalaluddin Bukhari
- Location: Uch, Punjab, Pakistan
- Coordinates: 29°14′24.5″N 71°3′10.3″E
- Type: Sufi shrine and Mausoleum

Shrine of Jalaluddin Bukhari (Urdu: مقبرہ جلال الدین بخاری) is the shrine of Jalaluddin Surkh-Posh Bukhari. It is located in Uch Sharif in present-day Punjab, Pakistan. It is one of the five monuments in Uch, Pakistan which are on the tentative list of the UNESCO World Heritage Sites.

== Death ==
In 1244 CE, Bukhari moved to Uch, and founded a religious school. He died in about 1290 CE and was buried in a small town near Uch. After his tomb was damaged by flood waters of the Ghaggar-Hakra River, Bukhari's remains were buried in Qattal. In 1027 AH, Sajjada Nashin Makhdoom Hamid, son of Muhammad Nassir-u-Din, moved Bukhari's remains to their present location in Uch and erected a building over them. In 1670 CE, the tomb was rebuilt by the Nawab of Bahawalpur, Bahawal Khan II. The tomb is a short way from the cemetery of Uch. It stands on a promontory overlooking the plains and the desert beyond. To one side of the tomb is a mosque decorated with blue tile work. In front of the tomb is a pool. A carved wooden door leads into the room containing Bukhari's coffin. UNESCO describes the site:

The brick-built tomb measures 18 meters by 24 meters and its carved wooden pillars support a flat roof and it is decorated with glazed tiles in floral and geometric designs. The ceiling is painted with floral designs in lacquer and its floor covered with the graves of the saint and his relatives an interior partition provides purdah for those of his womenfolk. Its mosque consists of a hall, measuring 20 meters by 11 meters, with 18 wooden pillars supporting a flat roof. It was built of cut and dressed bricks and further decorated, internally and externally, with enamelled tiles in floral and geometric designs.

=== Mela Uch Sharif ===
The Mela Uch Sharif is a week-long mela (folk festival) held in 10 – 12 Zilhaj. People from the southern Punjab come to honour Bukhari's role in spreading Islam. Participants visit Bukhari's tomb, and offer Friday prayers at the local mosque which was built by the Abbasids. The mela commemorates the congregation of Sufi saints connected with Bukhari. It aligns with the Hindu calendar month of Chaitra.

== US Funding ==
As part of the Ambassadors Fund for Cultural Preservation (2001 – 2011), $50,035 were allocated for the shrine.
