= Shrine of Baha'al-Halim =

- مقبرہ بہاول حلیم
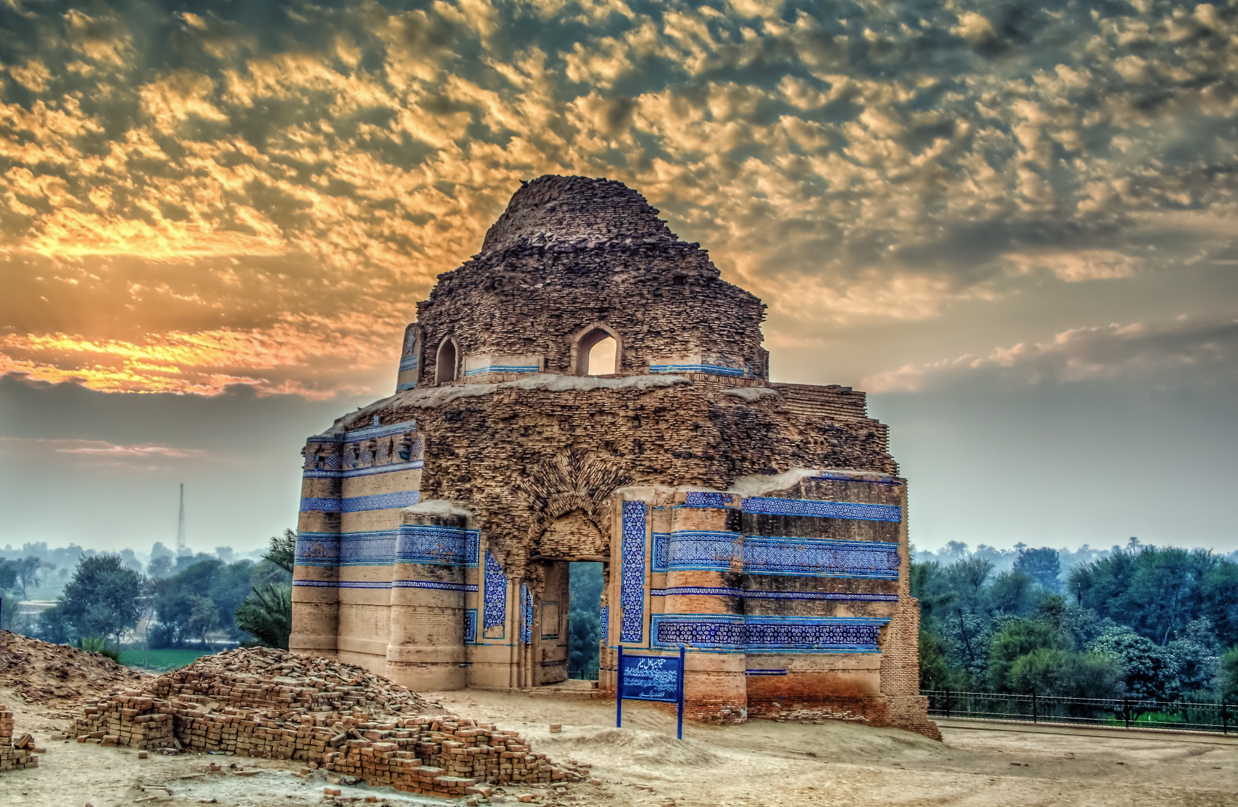
- Interactive map of Shrine of Baha'al-Halim
- Location: Uch, Punjab, Pakistan
- Type: Sufi shrine and Mausoleum

Shrine of Baha'al-Halim (Urdu: مقبرہ بہاول حلیم) is the shrine of Baha'al-Halim, an Islamic saint. It is the earliest of three located in Uch in present-day Punjab, Pakistan. It is one of the five monuments in Uch Sharif, Pakistan which are on the tentative list of the UNESCO World Heritage Sites.

The octagonal tomb is built of glazed bricks with turrets at each of its eight corners. A single dome is above a smaller octagonal dome with arched windows that sits on the base.
