= House of Abdus Salam =

- Interactive map of the House of Abdus Salam area

General information
- Location: Jhang, Punjab, Pakistan
- Coordinates: 31°18′20.72″N 72°19′34.92″E

The House of Abdus Salam (Urdu: عبدالسلام کا گھر) is a Pakistani house located in Jhang. It housed Pakistani Professor Abdus Salam, a theoretical physicist who became the first Muslim and Pakistani to be awarded the Nobel Prize in Physics in 1979.

== Location ==
The monument is located in Jhang, Punjab, Pakistan.

== Protection ==
After the Pakistani 18th Constitutional Amendment, most of the archaeological sites and national monuments were devolved to the provinces. The monuments transferred to the Punjab Archaeology Department included Abdus Salam's house, and funding and conservation initiatives were taken by the archaeology department.

== Sources ==
- Ghani, Abdul (1982). "Science Advisor to the President (1960–1974)". Abdus Salam: a Nobel laureate from a Muslim country : a biographical sketch. p. 234.
