= Multan Arts Council =

Coordinates: 30°12′12″N 71°27′07″E

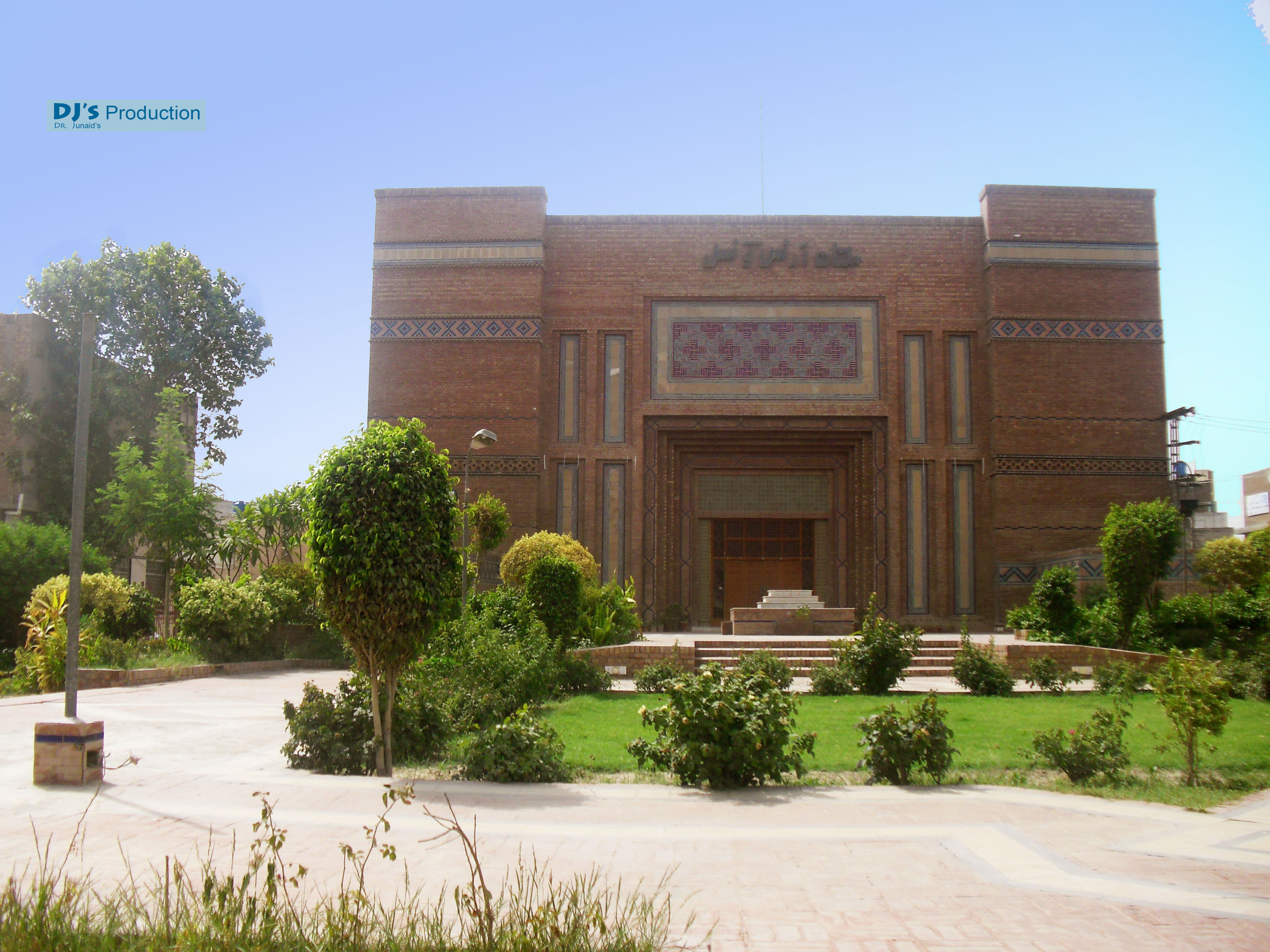

Multan Arts Council (شورای فنون ملتان) (established: 1975) is located in Multan city of Pakistan. Founded under the statutory provisions of the Punjab Council of Arts (شورای فنون پنجاب) Lahore in the year 1975 as its regional centre for the city of Multan.

Its building is located on MDA Road, Multan. It has a hall, art gallery, stage, and a garden.

== Major events held ==
Stage dramas and performances are held here. It also holds puppet shows, painting exhibitions, sculptures and other activities. The major shows held here include:

- 1st Sufi Festival 2006
- Sculptures of Sadiq Ali Shehzad exhibition
- Textile Fashion shows 2011
- International Women Day 2009
- Japanese Calendar Show
- Lok Mela
- Fine Arts Classes Work Thesis
- Saraiki Adab Festival 2015

== See also ==
- City of Multan
