= Rawalpindi Arts Council =

Art gallery and art institution

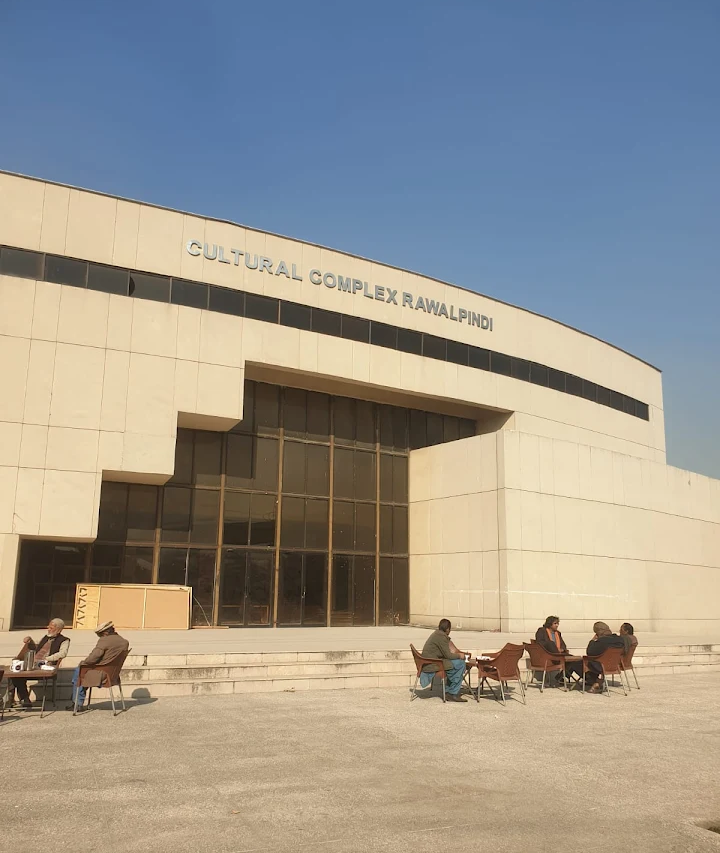
Rawalpindi Arts Council

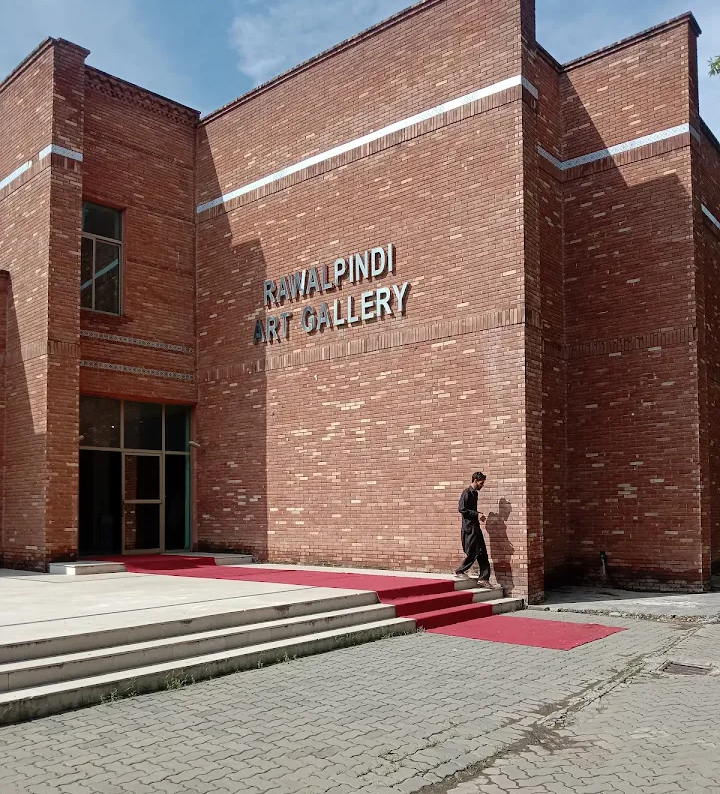
Rawalpindi Arts Council

Rawalpindi Arts Council (شورای فنون راولپنڈی) is an art gallery and art institution located at Stadium Road, Rawalpindi, in Pakistan's Punjab province. The institution was established in 1975 by the Government of Punjab. It promotes the culture and heritage of the country, and arranges various art competitions, including for dramas. Waqar Ahmed is the director of the RAC. Rawalpindi Arts Council is located adjacent to Shehbaz Sharif Sports Complex.
