= Faisalabad Arts Council =

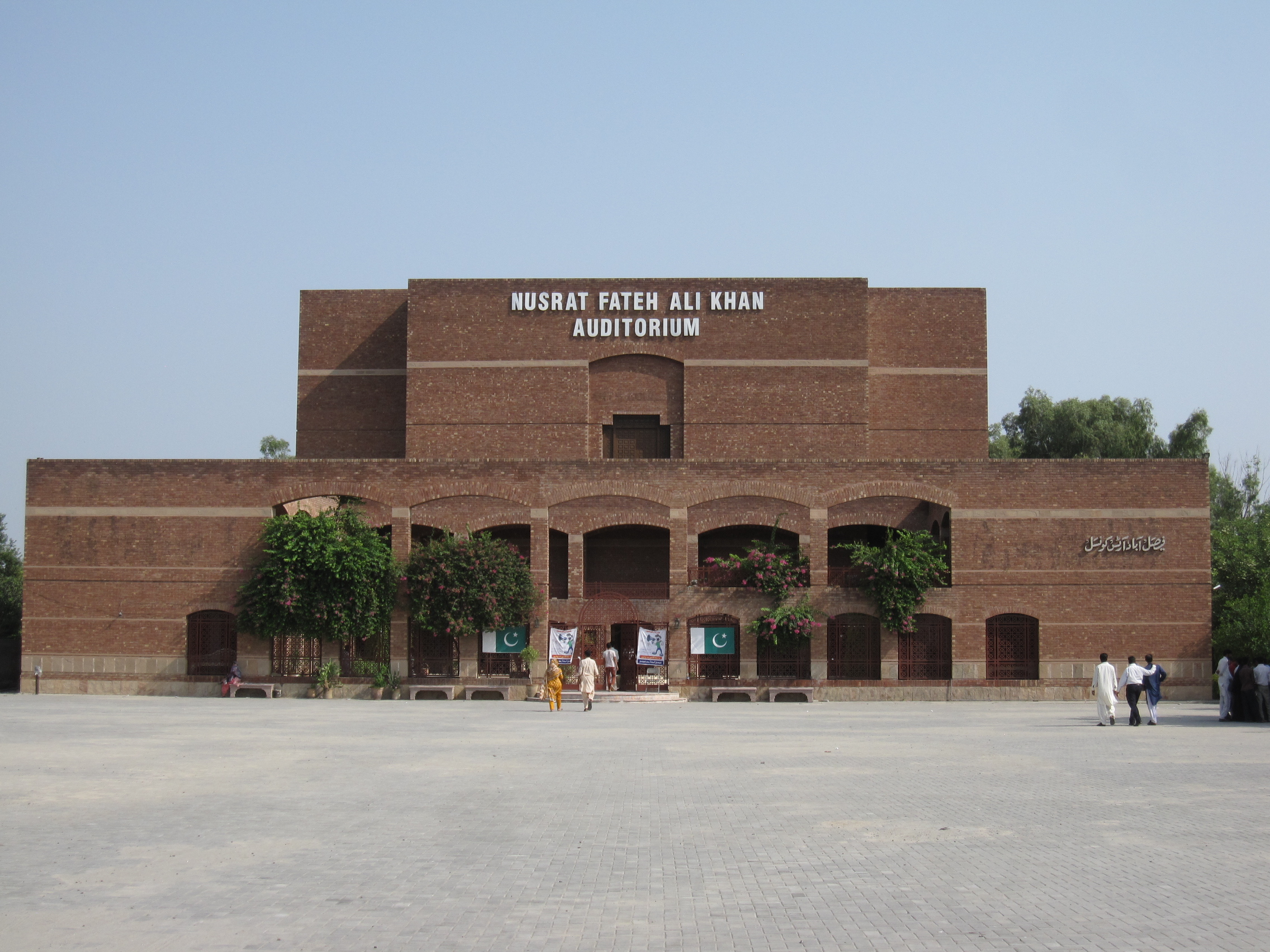
Nusrat Fateh Ali Khan Arts Council

Faisalabad Arts Council (شورای فنون فیصل آباد) is an arts center in Faisalabad, Pakistan. It was established in 1982 by the Government of Punjab, now working under the 'Punjab Arts Council'. It was designed by Nayyar Ali Dada and its current building was completed in 2006. Its chairman is the Commissioner of Faisalabad Division. Tariq Javaid is the resident director of arts council.
