= List of educational institutions in Bahawalpur =

This is a list of educational institutions located in the district of Bahawalpur in Pakistan.

Cholistan University Of Veterinary And Animal Sciences Bahawalpur.

== Primary and secondary educational institutions and colleges ==
- Sadiq Public School
- Dominican Convent Higher Secondary School Bahawalpur
- Govt. Sadiq Egerton College Bahawalpur
- Government Sadiq College Women University
- Islamia University Bahawalpur
- Allied Schools, a project of Punjab Group of Colleges
- The Educators
- ILM Group of Colleges
- Quaid-e-Azam Medical College
- zahra medical college
- Government College of Technology, Bahawalpur
- Government Unani Tibbia College, Bahawalpur
- Government Primary School Chak 39DB Yazman
- Government High School Chak 45DB Yazman
- Government High School Sajawal Wala
- Sadiq Dane High School
- Government technical high school Bahawalpur
- Moon system of education Bahawalpur
- Danish School Hasilpur, School of Saeed Anwar
