= Malik Muhammad Iqbal Channar =

Pakistani politician (1950–2026)

- ملک محمد اقبال چنڑ

Member of the National Assembly
- In office 29 February 2024 – 1 August 2026
- Succeeded by: Malik Munir Iqbal Channar
- Constituency: NA-168 Bahawalpur-V

Member of the Provincial Assembly
- In office 2002 – 31 May 2018
- Constituency: PP-272 Bahwalpur-VI

Personal details
- Born: 15 March 1950 Bahawalpur, Pakistan
- Died: 1 August 2026 (aged 76) Bahawalpur, Punjab, Pakistan
- Party: PMLN (2002–2026)
- Children: 5 (Ghazala, Fozia, Munir, Zaheer and Sonia)

Malik Muhammad Iqbal Channar (Urdu: ملک محمد اقبال چنڑر; 15 March 1950 – 1 August 2026) was a Pakistani politician who was a member of the National Assembly of Pakistan from February 2024 to 1 August 2026. He was a member of the Provincial Assembly of the Punjab from 2002 to May 2018.

He was the father of the member and the Deputy Speaker of the Provincial Assembly of Punjab, Zaheer Iqbal Channar.

== Early life and education ==
Malik Muhammad Iqbal Channar was born on 15 March 1950 in Bahawalpur Bahawalpur State, Dominion of Pakistan, (now in Punjab).

He had the degree of Bachelor of Laws which he received in 1971 from Wilayat Hussain Islamia Law College in Multan.

== Political career ==
Channar was elected to the Provincial Assembly of the Punjab as a candidate of the Pakistan Muslim League (N) (PML-N) from Constituency PP-272 (Bahawalpur-VI) in the 2002 Pakistani general election. He received 27,873 votes and defeated Zafar Iqbal, a candidate of the Pakistan Peoples Party (PPP).

He was re-elected to the Provincial Assembly of the Punjab as a candidate of PML-N from Constituency PP-272 (Bahawalpur-VI) in the 2008 Pakistani general election. He received 34,246 votes and defeated Ejaz Safdar, a candidate of Pakistan Muslim League (Q) (PML-Q). Following the election, he was inducted into the provincial Punjab cabinet of Chief Minister Shahbaz Sharif where he served as Provincial Minister of Punjab for Special Education from June 2008 until June 2010. In June 2010, he was appointed the Provincial Minister of Punjab for Prisons.

Channar was re-elected to the Provincial Assembly of the Punjab as a candidate of PML-N from Constituency PP-272 (Bahawalpur-VI) in the 2013 Pakistani general election. He received 40,409 votes and defeated Muhammad Asghar, a candidate of Pakistan Tehreek-e-Insaf (PTI). In June 2013, he was inducted into the provincial cabinet of Chief Minister Shahbaz Sharif and was made Provincial Minister of Punjab for Cooperatives.

He was elected to the National Assembly of Pakistan as a candidate of PML-N from NA-168 Bahawalpur-V in the 2024 Pakistani general election. He received 122,302 votes and defeated Sami Ullah Chaudhary, an independent candidate supported by PTI.

== Death ==
Channar died from complications of a brain haemorrhage in Bahawalpur, on 1 August 2026, at the age of 76.
