= Mian Allah Nawaz =

Pakistani jurist

Chief Justice of the Lahore High Court
- In office 7 February 2000 – 17 July 2000
- Preceded by: Rashid Aziz Khan
- Succeeded by: Falak Sher

Personal details
- Born: 1938 Bahawalpur, Punjab, British India
- Died: 6 August 2025 (aged 86–87) Lahore, Punjab, Pakistan
- Profession: Jurist

Mian Allah Nawaz (1938 – 6 August 2025) was a Pakistani jurist who served as chief justice of the Lahore High Court in 2000. He was enrolled as an advocate of the Lahore High Court in 1966, became an advocate of the Supreme Court of Pakistan in 1970, and was elevated to the Lahore High Court bench in 1988. He retired in July 2000 after serving for about five months as chief justice.

== Early life and education ==
Allah Nawaz was born in 1938 in Bahawalpur. He graduated from Government Sadiq Edgerton College in 1960 and received his LL.B. from Punjab University Law College, Lahore, in 1962.

== Career ==
Allah Nawaz began legal practice in Bahawalpur in 1964 and was enrolled as an advocate of the Lahore High Court in 1966. He became an advocate of the Supreme Court of Pakistan in 1970. In 1971, he was elected president of the District Bar Association.

During his years in practice, he became known for work in civil and constitutional matters before the Lahore High Court and the Supreme Court. He also taught as a visiting lecturer at the faculty of law of Islamia University Bahawalpur.

In 1988, he was appointed an additional judge of the Lahore High Court and was later confirmed as a judge of the court. He was elevated as chief justice of the Lahore High Court in February 2000 and remained in office until his retirement on 17 July 2000.
