= NA-168 Bahawalpur-V =

Constituency of the National Assembly of Pakistan

- Constituency for the National Assembly of Pakistan
- Region: Bahawalpur Saddar Tehsil (partly) including Bahawalpur City and Bahawalpur Cantonment areas of Bahawalpur District
- Electorate: 447,963

Current constituency
- Member: Malik Munir Iqbal Channar
- Created from: NA-185 Bahawalpur-III

NA-168 Bahawalpur-V (این اے- 168، بہاولپور-5) is a constituency for the National Assembly of Pakistan.

== Members of Parliament ==
=== 2018–2023: NA-170 Bahawalpur-I ===
Election	Member	Party
2018	Muhammad Farooq Azam Malik	PTI

=== 2024–present: NA-168 Bahawalpur-V ===
Election	Member	Party
2024	Malik Muhammad Iqbal Channar	PML(N)
2026	Malik Munir Iqbal Channar	PML(N)

== Election 2002 ==
General elections were held on 10 October 2002. Muhammad Farooq Azam Malik of National Alliance won by 30,361 votes.

General election 2002: NA-185 Bahawalpur-III
Party	Candidate	Votes	%	±%
NA	Muhammad Farooq Azam Malik	30,361	30.18	
PPP	Muhammad Hussain Khan	23,184	23.05	
PML(Q)	Syed Tabish Alwari	14,396	14.31	
PML(N)	Gull-e-Raana	13,515	13.43	
MMA	Haq Nawaz Qamar	12,148	12.08	
PAT	Sahibzada Munawar Hayat Abbasi	4,669	4.64	
Others	Others (three candidates)	2,329	2.31	
Turnout		103,285	37.59	
Total valid votes		100,602	97.40	
Rejected ballots		2,683	2.60	
Majority		7,177	7.13	
Registered electors		274,790		

== Election 2008 ==
General elections were held on 18 February 2008. Baligh Ur Rehman of PML-N won by 54,334 votes.

General election 2008: NA-185 Bahawalpur-III
Party	Candidate	Votes	%	±%
PML(N)	Baligh Ur Rehman	54,334	44.75	
PPP	Muhammad Farooq Azam Malik	47,337	38.99	
PML(Q)	Muhammad Afrooq Anwar Abbasi	18,822	15.50	
Others	Others (four candidates)	920	0.76	
Turnout		123,824	33.97	
Total valid votes		121,413	98.05	
Rejected ballots		2,411	1.95	
Majority		6,997	5.76	
Registered electors		364,465		
PML(N) gain from NA				

== Election 2013 ==
General elections were held on 11 May 2013. Baligh Ur Rehman of PML-N won by 88,379 votes and became a member of National Assembly.

General election 2013: NA-185 Bahawalpur-III
Party	Candidate	Votes	%	±%
PML(N)	Baligh Ur Rehman	88,219	51.74	
Bahawalpur National Awami Party	Muhammad Farooq Azam Malik	65,794	38.59	
Others	Others (sixteen candidates)	16,494	9.67	
Turnout		174,131	52.13	
Total valid votes		170,507	97.92	
Rejected ballots		3,624	2.08	
Majority		22,425	13.15	
Registered electors		334,038		
PML(N) hold				

== Election 2018 ==
General elections were held on 25 July 2018.

General election 2018: NA-170 Bahawalpur-I
Party	Candidate	Votes	%	±%
PTI	Muhammad Farooq Azam Malik	84,495	45.56	
PML(N)	Baligh Ur Rehman	74,694	40.27	
Others	Others (ten candidates)	26,275	14.17	
Turnout		188,576	52.29	
Total valid votes		185,464	98.35	
Rejected ballots		3,112	1.65	
Majority		9,801	5.28	
Registered electors		360,608		
PTI gain from PML(N)				

== Election 2024 ==
General elections were held on 8 February 2024. Malik Muhammad Iqbal Channar won the election with 122,302 votes.

General election 2024: NA-168 Bahawalpur-V
Party	Candidate	Votes	%	±%
PML(N)	Malik Muhammad Iqbal Channar	122,302	59.30	▲19.03
PTI	Sami Ullah Chaudhary (Note: Filed nomination papers as PTI candidate but ECP allowed him to run as an Independent)	50,360	24.42	▼21.14
Others	Others (twenty-two candidates)	33,589	16.29	
Turnout		209,393	46.74	▼5.55
Total valid votes		206,251	98.50	
Rejected ballots		3,142	1.50	
Majority		71,942	34.88	
Registered electors		447,963		
PML(N) gain from PTI				

== By-election 2026 ==
A by-election was held on 27 September 2026 due to the death of Malik Muhammad Iqbal Channar, the previous member from this seat. His son, Malik Munir Iqbal Channar, won the election with 87,789 votes.

By-election 2026: NA-168 Bahawalpur-V
Party	Candidate	Votes	%	±%
PML(N)	Malik Munir Iqbal Channar	87,789	62.33	
Independent	Wali Dad Cheema	39,888	28.32	
Independent	Muhammad Idrees Khan Khakwani	6,081	4.32	
Independent	Sohail Ahmed	4,946	3.51	
Others	Others (sixteen candidates)	2,143	1.52	
Turnout		142,320	29.46	
Total valid votes		140,847	98.97	
Rejected ballots		1,473	1.03	
Majority		47,901	34.01	
Registered electors		483,143		
PML(N) hold				

== See also ==
- NA-167 Bahawalpur-IV
- NA-169 Rahim Yar Khan-I
