= Shaheen Raza =

Pakistani politician (1954–2020)

Member of the Provincial Assembly of the Punjab
- In office 15 August 2018 – 20 May 2020
- Constituency: W-316 (Reserved seat for women)

Personal details
- Born: 1954 Gujranwala, Punjab, Pakistan
- Died: 20 May 2020 (aged 65) Lahore, Punjab, Pakistan
- Party: PTI (2018-2020)

Shaheen Raza Cheema (1954 – 20 May 2020) was a Pakistani politician and a member of the Provincial Assembly of the Punjab who hailed from Gujranwala. She held the office from August 2018 to May 2020. She died of COVID-19 on 20 May 2020.

== Political career ==
She was elected to the Provincial Assembly of the Punjab as a candidate of Pakistan Tehreek-e-Insaf (PTI) on a reserved seat for women from Gujranwala in the 2018 Pakistani general election.

== Death ==
Raza died in the Mayo Hospital in Lahore from COVID-19 during the COVID-19 pandemic in Pakistan on 20 May 2020. Her age has been reported as 69, 65 and 60. It is said that she caught the virus while visiting a field hospital for coronavirus treatment in Gujranwala. Reportedly she suffered from diabetes and blood pressure issues at the time of her death. She was buried in Gujranwala.
