= Dring Stadium, Bahawalpur =

Multi-purpose stadium in Bahawalpur, Pakistan

Dring Stadium
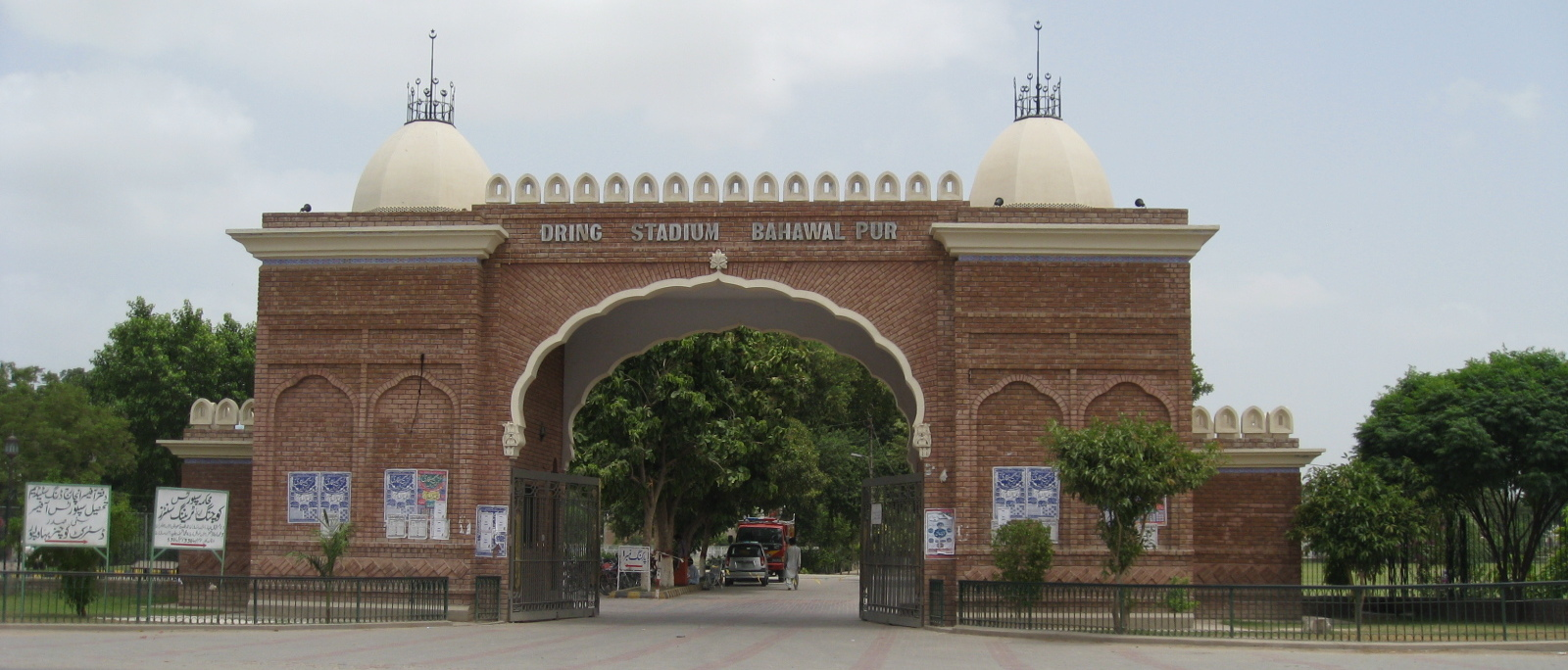
- Interactive map of Dring Stadium

Ground information
- Location: Stadium Road, Bahawalpur, Punjab, Pakistan
- Country: Pakistan
- Coordinates: 29°24′15″N 71°41′04″E
- Establishment: 1954
- Capacity: 15,000
- Owner: Pakistan Cricket Board
- Operator: Pakistan Cricket Board
- Tenants: Pakistan

International information
- Only men's Test: 15 January 1955: Pakistan v India
- As of 1 January 2017; Source: Cricinfo

The Dring Stadium, also known as Bahawal Stadium, is a multi-purpose stadium in Bahawalpur, Punjab, Pakistan. It is often used for cricket and football. Situated on Stadium Road, opposite Bahawalpur Zoo, the stadium can accommodate 15,000 spectators.

Besides being used for cricket, hockey and football, the stadium also includes a swimming pool, a karate venue, gym, as well as squash, volleyball and tennis courts.

== History ==
The stadium was originally called Dring Stadium after the second Prime Minister of Bahawalpur, Sir John Dring. Dring was Prime Minister under Nawab Sadiq V and served in this role from 1948 to 1952. Dring Stadium was ahead of its time and was the only complete stadium in Pakistan at the time.

== Cricket ==
It was the first cricket ground in West Pakistan to host a Test match, when it hosted the second Test of Indian cricket team in Pakistan in 1954–55, India's inaugural tour of Pakistan. However, this was the only Test match to be held at this ground. As of 2002, 155 first class matches and 23 List A matches have been played at this ground.

As Bahawalpur's cricket team has been without first-class status since 2002–03, there was only one first-class match and one List A match here for the three seasons following that, but the ground still hosts Under-19 matches.

=== International centuries ===
One Test century has been scored at the venue.

No.	Score	Player	Team	Balls	Opposing team	Date	Result
1	142	Hanif Mohammad	Pakistan	NA	India	15 January 1955	Drawn

=== International five-wicket hauls ===
Two five-wicket hauls in Test matches have been taken at the venue.

No.	Bowler	Date	Team	Opposing team	Inn	Overs	Runs	Wkts	Econ	Result
1	Khan Mohammad	15 January 1955	Pakistan	India	1	33	74	5	2.24	Drawn
2	Polly Umrigar	15 January 1955	India	Pakistan	2	58	74	6	1.27	Drawn

== Football ==
In 1993, the stadium hosted the National B-Division Football Championship. The stadium hosted the 2013 National Challenge Cup.

== See also ==
- List of Test cricket grounds
- One-Test wonder
- List of stadiums in Pakistan
- List of cricket grounds in Pakistan
- List of sports venues in Karachi
- List of sports venues in Lahore
- List of sports venues in Faisalabad
- List of stadiums by capacity

== Further references ==
- Bahawal Stadium, from cricinfo.com, Retrieved 16 March 2006.
