= Zaheer Iqbal Channar =

Pakistani politician

Deputy Speaker of the Provincial Assembly
- Incumbent
- Assumed office 24 February 2024
- Speaker: Malik Ahmad Khan
- Preceded by: Wasiq Qayyum Abbasi

Member of the Provincial Assembly
- Incumbent
- Assumed office 23 February 2024
- Constituency: PP-253 Bahawalpur-IX
- In office 15 August 2018 – 14 January 2023
- Constituency: PP-245 (Bahawalpur-I)

Personal details
- Born: Bahawalpur, Pakistan
- Party: PMLN (2018-present)
- Relations: Malik Munir Iqbal Channar (brother)
- Parent: Iqbal Channar (father)

Zaheer Iqbal Channar (Urdu: ظہیراقبال چنڑر) is a Pakistani politician who is the current Deputy Speaker of the Provincial Assembly of the Punjab. The son of senior politician of PMLN, Malik Muhammad Iqbal Channar, he has been a member of the Provincial Assembly of the Punjab since 24 February 2024 and previously served from August 2018 till January 2023.

== Political career ==
Zaheer was elected as the member of the Provincial Assembly of the Punjab for the first time on PML-N ticket from Constituency PP-245 (Bahawalpur-I) in the 2018 Pakistani general election.

He received 47,177 votes defeating Asghar Joya, the Pakistan Tehreek-e-Insaf candidate.
