= Bahawalpur Museum =

- Punjabi: بہاولپور عجائب گھر
- Established: 1976; 50 years ago
- Location: Bahawalpur, Punjab, Pakistan
- Coordinates: 29°23′24″N 71°41′08″E
- Type: Archaeology, art, heritage, modern history, religious
- Visitors: 28,000
- Director: Muhammad Zubair Rabbani

The Bahawalpur Museum (Punjabi: بہاولپور عجائب گھر) was established in the year 1976 for the purpose of preserving and showcasing the historical and cultural heritage of the area.

As of May 2015, the director of the museum is Muhammad Zubair Rabbani.

== Galleries ==
The museum has eight galleries, which include:

- Pakistan Movement gallery, consisting of a collection of photographs related to the Movement, including those of its leaders.
- Archaeological gallery, which represents the archaeological history of the region.
- Islamic gallery, which exhibits arms, paintings, textile specimen, and metal work related to the history of Islam.
- Regional cultural gallery, containing specimens of everyday objects used by people in the Cholistan Desert and the Bahawalnagar, Bahawalpur, and Rahim Yar Khan districts.
- Coin gallery, consisting of more than 300 coins
- Quran gallery, containing manuscripts, inscriptions and Quranic documents.
- Bahawalpur gallery, showing photographs and articles related to the princely state of Bahawalpur, which was the second-largest state in the British Raj.
- Cholistan gallery, displaying art and heritage of the Cholistan region.
- Sadiq Khan Gallery

== Other Artifacts ==
The museum also hosts lot of artifacts related to the historic Kala Dhari Mandir temple including its main gate, windows, ventilators etc.

== See also ==
- List of museums in Pakistan
- Bahawalpur Airport
- Bahawalpur Zoo
- Derawar Fort
- Noor Mahal
