= Abdur Rahman Hye =

Pakistani architect (born 1919)

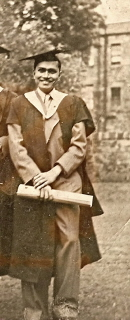
- A.R. Hye, on his graduation day at the University of Edinburgh, 1951.
- Born: 17 December 1919; Hyderabad, Hyderabad State (Present-day Andhra Pradesh, India)
- Died: 18 September 2008 (aged 88); Islamabad, Pakistan
- Education: Sir J. J. College of Architecture; University of Edinburgh
- Occupation: Architect
- Buildings: Generals Combatant Army Headquarters (GHQ); Quaid-e-Azam Medical College; Khyber Medical College; Gazetted Officers Housing, GOR III Lahore
- Projects: Buildings at Mayo Hospital; Buildings at Nishtar Medical College of Multan; Mosque, Gazetted Officers Residences (GOR) I, Lahore; Minister's Residences, Lahore
- Design: Auditorium, Lahore College for Women University; Additions to APWA College for Women; Minister's Residences, Lahore

Abdur Rahman Hye (Urdu: عبد الرحمن حئی; 17 December 1919 – 18 September 2008) was a Pakistani architect and a pioneer of institutional architectures in Pakistan.

== Early life and training ==
After graduating from Sir J.J. College of Architecture, Bombay before the independence of Pakistan in 1947, A.R. Hye travelled aboard ocean liner SS Ile de France from Bombay to the United Kingdom on a trip which in those days took three weeks on the ship, and later took him seven years in United Kingdom to train as an architect. He received his architecture degree from the University of Edinburgh in 1951 and was admitted to the membership of the Royal Institute of British Architects (RIBA). He received some of his early education in Hyderabad State when his family moved there temporarily.

He arrived in Europe after World War II, and witnessed first-hand the reconstruction of Europe. This experience influenced his architecture and his philosophy, and once he returned home he specialised in using indigenous resources to provide maximum comfort. He used natural ventilation, strategic placement of windows, courtyards and overhangs and used wind flow in some designs to provide natural protection against harsh exterior climate conditions. Those days he was one of the few qualified architects in his newly independent country. In 1952, after his return from the UK, A.R. Hye married Qudsia. They have three children: Laique, Fatimah wife of Syed Waliullah Husaini, and Ayesha wife of Kazi Zulkader Siddiqui.

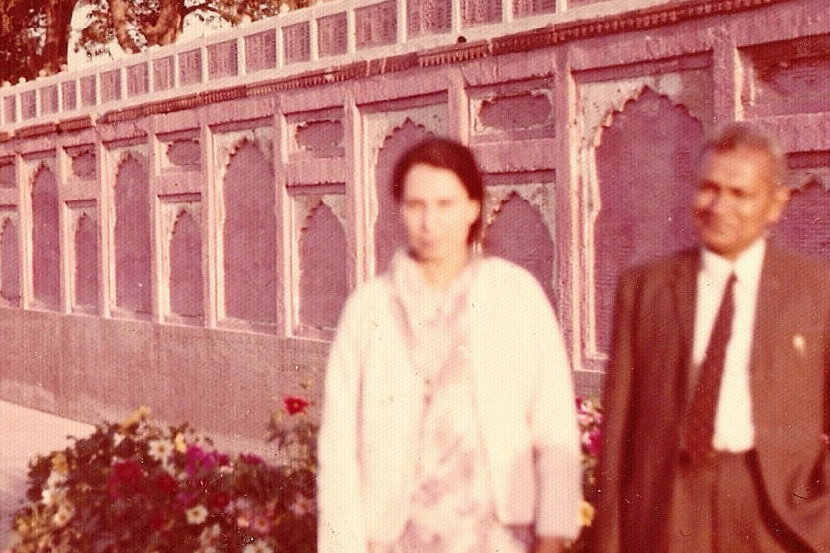
A. R. Hye and wife Qudsia at a historic Mughal Architecture site in Lahore

A.R. Hye returned to the UK in the 1960s, to specialise in Tropical Architecture at the Architectural Association School of Architecture in London.

== Career ==
While A.R. Hye was in the UK, when Pakistan gained independence in 1947. Hye moved to East Pakistan after his return, where his education and background gave him the opportunity to use his skills to influence the architectural landscape of his country at a very early stage. A.R. Hye is considered the father of Institutional Architecture in Pakistan.

His first major assignment in East Pakistan was to design and build the infrastructure of the new country. Thus in the 1950s, early in his career, Hye became the Chief Town planner of the port city of Chittagong. In this capacity, he was responsible for working on the master plan of Chittagong Township and Cox's Bazar. He also worked as Architect Planner in Dhaka.

In 1958 he moved to West Pakistan, and joined the Government in 1959 to become the first Chief Architect of the Government of West Pakistan. He was responsible for the architectural design of all government buildings in the cities and towns of West Pakistan, including Karachi, Lahore, Rawalpindi, Peshawar, Quetta, Multan, Jhelum, Bahawalpur, Sialkot, Gujrat, Mardan, Faisalabad, Sahiwal, Hyderabad, Mianwali, and Kalabagh. He remained in this position until West Pakistan was broken into four provinces, after the resignation of President Ayub Khan. Thereafter, he was asked to become the Chief Architect of the Government of Punjab, the largest of the four provinces.

In 1967 till 1971, Hye acted as the "chief architect" for the Generals Combatant Headquarter (GHQ), designing the entire GHQ buildings and associated areas for the military's staff services. Based in Lahore, he remained in that position until his retirement from government service in 1981. Many of his designs were built in the early 80's after his retirement.

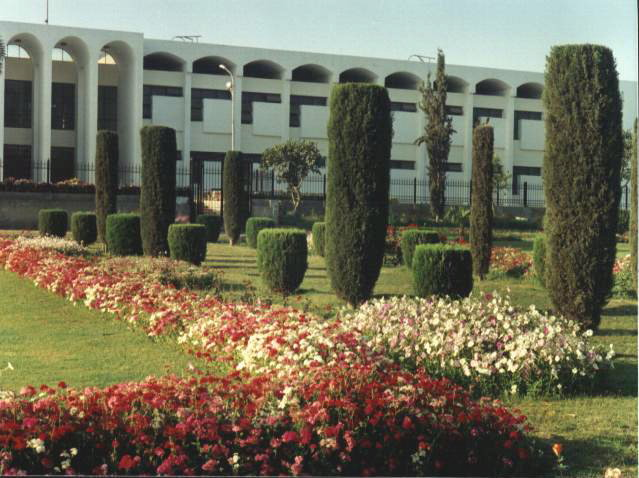
Quaid-e-Azam Medical College

As Chief Architect of West Pakistan and Punjab, his designs included colleges, schools, polytechnic institutions - Dhaka Polytechnic Institute, hospitals, housing schemes and townships. During this period, he designed more buildings than any other architect of his era in Pakistan. The best known of his projects is the Bahawalpur Medical College, now renamed Quaid-e-Azam Medical College, in Bahawalpur. His projects also included many Tehsil Hospitals.

Upon his retirement from service in 1981, A.R. Hye spent a few years travelling and living in the USA. After 1995 he lived a retired life in Islamabad in a house designed by himself, dying on 18 September 2008.

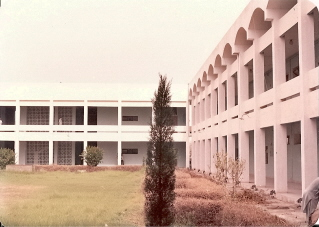
Courtyard of Quaid-e-Azam Medical College

== Selected projects ==
- Quaid-e-Azam Medical College, Bahawalpur
- Khyber Medical College, Peshawar
- Buildings at Mayo Hospital, Lahore (1960–80)
- Buildings at Nishtar Medical College, Multan (1960–80)
- Auditorium, Lahore College for Women University
- Mosque, Gazetted Officers Residences (GOR) I, Lahore
- Additions to APWA College for Women
- Minister's Residences, Lahore
- Officers Housing, GOR III Shadman, Lahore
- Dhaka Polytechnic Institute, Dhaka

== See also ==
- List of Pakistanis
