= Syed Waseem Akhtar =

Pakistani politician (1956–2019)

Member of the Provincial Assembly of the Punjab
- In office 29 May 2013 – 31 May 2018
- Succeeded by: Samiullah Chaudhry
- Constituency: PP-271 Bahawalpur-V

Personal details
- Born: 9 September 1956 Lahore
- Died: 3 June 2019 (aged 62)
- Party: Jamaat-e-Islami Pakistan

Syed Waseem Akhtar (9 September 1956 – 3 June 2019) was a Pakistani politician who had been a Member of the Provincial Assembly of the Punjab, between 1990 and May 2018.

== Early life and education ==
He was born on 9 September 1956 in Lahore.

He has a degree of Bachelor of Medicine and Bachelor of Surgery which he obtained in 1980 from Quaid-e-Azam Medical College.

== Family ==
His son, Dr. Hafiz Syed Umar Abdur Rehman, is a renowned ophthalmologist in Bahawalpur. He obtained his Bachelor of Medicine and Bachelor of Surgery (MBBS) degree and is a Fellow of the College of Physicians and Surgeons (FCPS). Dr. Rehman worked at Cork University Hospital from 2017 to 2018 and at University Hospital Limerick from 2018 to 2019.

== Political career ==
He ran for the seat of the Provincial Assembly of the Punjab as a candidate of Islami Jamhoori Ittehad (IJI) from Constituency PP-222 (Bahawalpur-V) in the 1988 Pakistani general election but was unsuccessful. He received 11,752 votes and lost the seat to a candidate of Pakistan Peoples Party (PPP).

He was elected to the Provincial Assembly of the Punjab as a candidate of IJI from Constituency PP-271 (Bahawalpur-V) in the 1990 Pakistani general election. He received 32,382 votes and defeated a candidate of Pakistan Democratic Alliance.

He ran for the seat of the Provincial Assembly of the Punjab as a candidate of Pakistan Islamic Front (PIF) from Constituency PP-271 (Bahawalpur-V) in the 1993 Pakistani general election but was unsuccessful. He received 5,312 votes and lost the seat to a candidate of Pakistan Muslim League (N) (PML-N).

He was re-elected to the Provincial Assembly of the Punjab as a candidate of Muttahida Majlis-e-Amal from Constituency PP-271 (Bahawalpur-V) in the 2002 Pakistani general election. He received 21,078 votes and defeated a candidate of PPP.

He was re-elected to the Provincial Assembly of the Punjab as a candidate of Jamaat-e-Islami Pakistan from Constituency PP-271 (Bahawalpur-V) in the 2013 Pakistani general election.

== Death ==
He died on 3 June 2019 at age of 62 following a brief illness. His funeral was offered in Bahawalpur.
