= QMC =

QMC may refer to:

- Quaid e Azam Medical College, a medical college in Bahawalpur, Pakistan
- Quantum Monte Carlo, a class of computer algorithms
- Quartermaster Corporal, a type of appointment in the British Household Cavalry
- Quasi-Monte Carlo method, an integration method in mathematics
- Queen Margaret College, now Queen Margaret University, in Edinburgh, Scotland
- Queen Margaret College (Wellington), an all-girls high school in Wellington, New Zealand
- Queen Mary Coast, a portion of the coast of Antarctica
- Queen Mary College, a former college of the University of London, now part of Queen Mary University of London
- Queen Mary's College, Chennai, a women's college in Chennai
- Queen Mary's College, a Sixth Form College in Basingstoke, Hampshire, England
- Queen's Medical Centre, a hospital in Nottingham, England
- Quezon Memorial Circle, a national park and shrine in Quezon City, Philippines
- Quine–McCluskey algorithm, a method used for the minimization of Boolean functions
- United States Army Quartermaster Corps, a corps of the United States Army
