= Malik Munir Iqbal Channar =

Pakistani politician

- ملک منیر اقبال چنڑ

Member of the National Assembly of Pakistan
- Incumbent
- Assumed office 13 October 2026
- Preceded by: Malik Muhammad Iqbal Channar
- Constituency: NA-168 Bahawalpur-V

Personal details
- Party: PMLN (2026-present)
- Relations: Zaheer Iqbal Channar (brother)
- Parent: Malik Muhammad Iqbal Channar (father)
- Occupation: Politician

Malik Munir Iqbal Channar (Urdu: ملک منیر اقبال چنڑ) is a Pakistani politician from Bahawalpur who has been a member of the National Assembly of Pakistan since October 2026.

== Political career ==
Channar was elected to the National Assembly of Pakistan in a September 2026 by-election from NA-168 Bahawalpur-V as a candidate of Pakistan Muslim League (N) (PML(N)). The by-election was called due to the death of Malik Muhammad Iqbal Channar, his father. He received 87,789 votes and defeated Wali Dad Cheema, an independent candidate. He was sworn in as a member on 13 October 2026.
