= Bahawal Victoria Hospital =

Bahawal Victoria Hospital بہاول وکٹوریہ سپتال
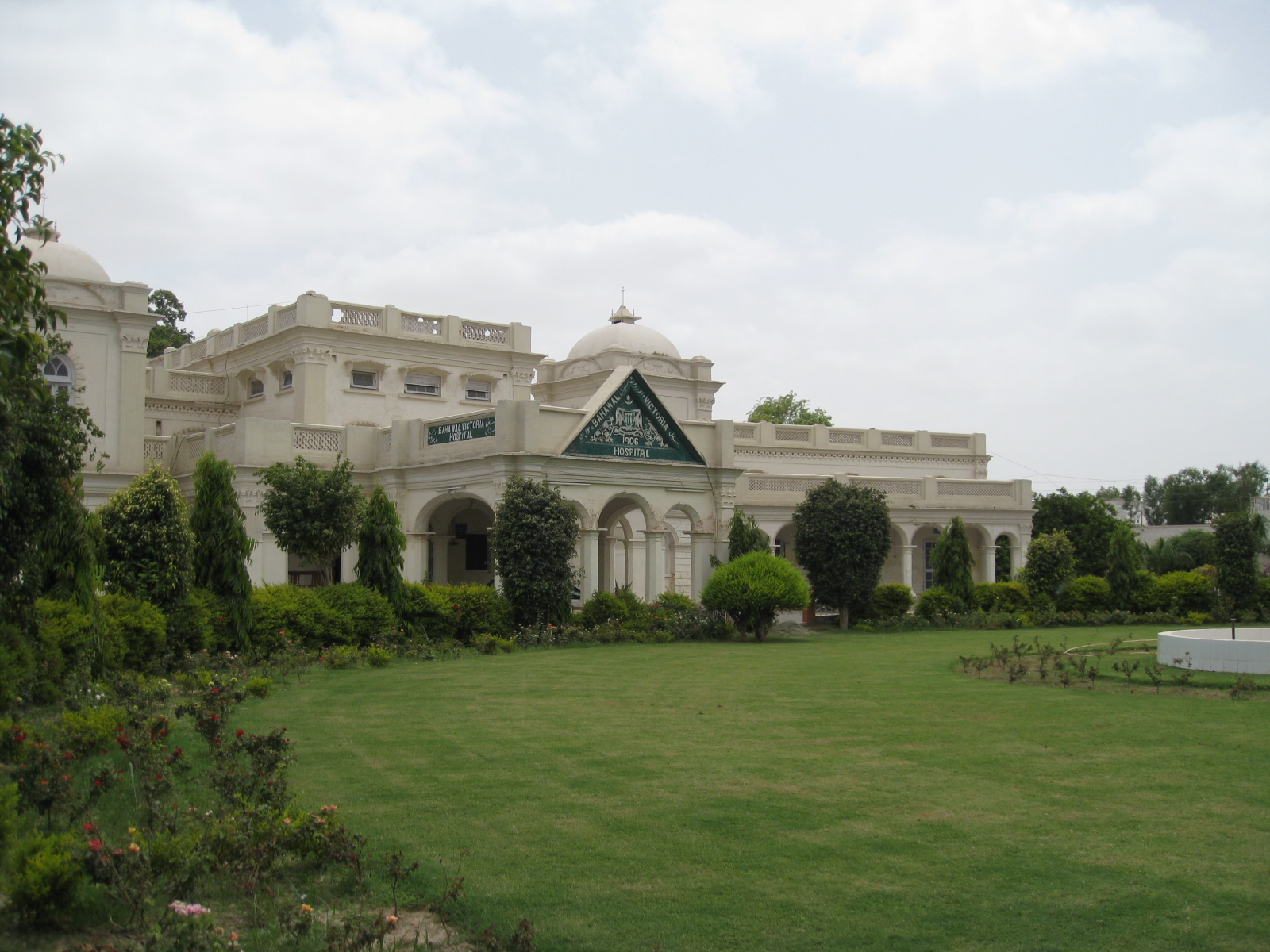

Geography
- Location: Bahawalpur, Punjab, Pakistan
- Coordinates: 29°23′22″N 71°40′51″E

Organisation
- Type: Teaching
- Affiliated university: Quaid-e-Azam Medical College

Services
- Emergency department: Yes

Links
- Lists: Hospitals in Pakistan

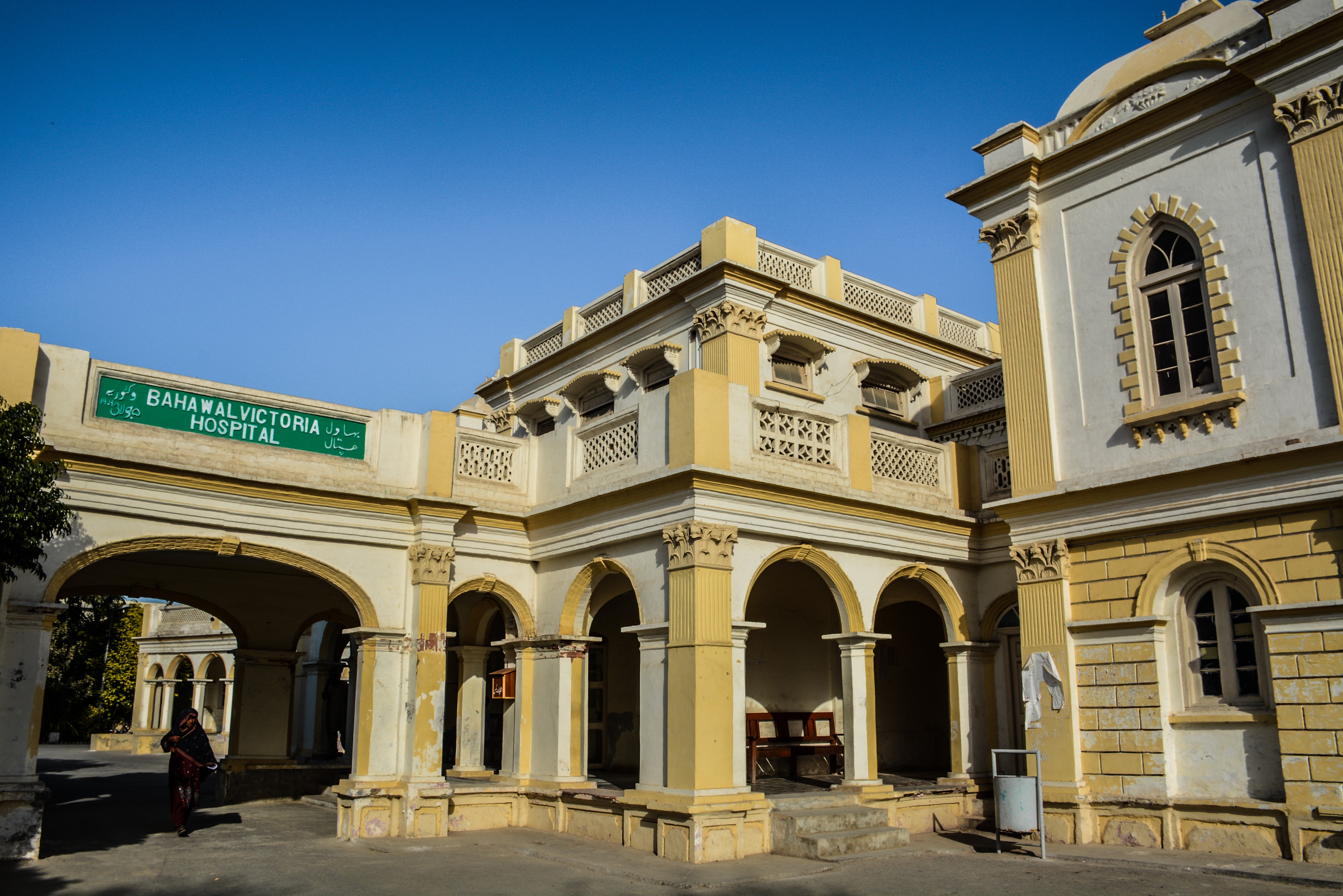
MS Office Bahawal Victoria Hospital

Bahawal Victoria Hospital (BVH) (Urdu: بہاول وکٹوریہ سپتال) is a hospital located in Bahawalpur, Pakistan. It is named after Nawab of Bahawalpur's British wife, Victoria.

== History ==
It started as a Civil Hospital with an outdoor department, a dispensary, and an operating theatre in 1876. In 1906, this health unit was named Bahawal Victoria Hospital. Now, it is a hub of clinical expertise both in specialties and sub-specialties with a multitude of patients visiting the hospital. In 1952, a benevolent extension of Nursing School was brought about to offer prompt basic health amenities. Classes leading to L.S.M.F were also started in 1956. Its nexus with Quaid-e-Azam Medical College (QAMC) in 1970 has transformed it into one of the largest tertiary care facilities in the province of Punjab.

It is now a 2200-bed, fully equipped, tertiary-care hospital with all medical and surgical specialities, serving large number of patients in south Punjab. It facilitates undergraduate medical students of Quaid-e-Azam Medical College, nursing students of allied nursing school, paramedics and many post-graduate trainees.

== Units and departments ==
- Department of Medicine (consists of four wards/units)
- Department of Surgery (consists of four wards/units)
- Department of Obstetrics and Gynaecology (consists of two wards/units)
- Department of Paediatrics (consists of two wards/units)
- Department of Allied Medicine
  - Cardiology/CCU unit
  - Nephrology/Dialysis unit
  - Pulmonology/Chest Diseases unit
  - Dermatology unit
  - Psychiatry/Behavioural Sciences unit
- Department of Allied Surgery (consists of two units of each of
  - Otolaryngology (two units)
  - Ophthalmology (two units)
  - Plastic/Reconstructive Surgery
  - Orthopedic Surgery
  - Urology
  - Neurosurgery
  - Accidents and Emergency Department
  - Paediatric Surgery
- Department of Radiology and Medical Imaging
- Department of Pathology/Medical Laboratory Sciences
  - Histopathology section
  - Haematology section
  - Microbiology section
  - Chemical Pathology section
  - Molecular Biology/PCR section
  - Endocrinology section
- Department of Physiotherapy
- Department of Public Health/Community Medicine
