= Government Sadiq Egerton College Bahawalpur =

College in Punjab, Pakistan

Government Sadiq Egerton College
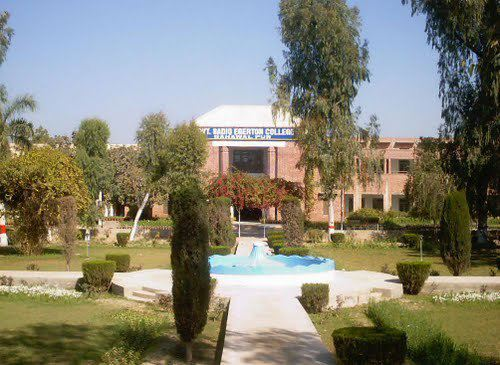
- Motto in English: Serving the nation through education
- Type: Public
- Established: April 25, 1886 as Egerton College Bahawalpur; May 13, 1890 as Sadiq Egerton College Bahawalpur
- Founders: Sadeq Mohammad Khan IV; Robert Eyles Egerton
- Affiliations: The Islamia University of Bahawalpur, Board of Intermediate and Secondary Education, Bahawalpur
- Principal: Muhammad Shahid
- Location: Bahawalpur, Punjab, Pakistan
- Nickname: SE College
- Mascot: Al-Sadiqoon
- Website: gsec.edu.pk

The Government Sadiq Egerton College, also known as S.E. College, is an autonomous government college located in Bahawalpur, Pakistan. It is named after the Nawab of Bahawalpur Sadeq Mohammad Khan IV and Lieutenant Governor of the Punjab Sir Robert Eyles Egerton. It has a tradition of providing an education that uses academics, sports and co-curricular activities as tools for character development.

== History ==
The Government Sadiq Egerton College was founded as Sir Robert Egerton School, also called Upper Egerton School, in 1882. Four years later the Bahawalpur State Education Committee resolved to upgrade the school; collegiate classes commenced on 25 April 1886, making it the third tertiary institution between Multan and Lahore. The original site of the school was later converted into a hospital, named Zanana Hospital. In 1892, degree classes were started.

Tuition in the early decades was free, with scholarships and even travel expenses underwritten by the Bahawalpur Darbar. Only seven students entered in the inaugural year, but a rapid rise in enrolment forced a move in 1911 from cramped quarters in Mohallah Kajalpura to a purpose-built site outside Fareed Gate, what is now Sadiq Dane High School. The present red-brick campus was begun in 1950, when Bahawalpur's prime minister Colonel John Dring lied the foundation stone; teaching shifted there the following year. Extensions in 1957 added science laboratories, new classrooms and an auditorium, while postgraduate teaching started in 1970. Centenary celebrations were held in 1986, and the college marked its 125th anniversary with a three-day festival in April 2010.

In 2016, the official website of the college was launched.

== Facilities, teaching, and student life ==
The Farid Gate campus centres on a 1950s double-storey academic block shaded by neem and banyan trees. Behind it stands Qasim Hostel, erected in 1951 for 150 boarders, alongside a later hostel built to meet demand. Separate wings house physics, chemistry, and zoology laboratories created during the 1957 expansion, and the barrel-roofed auditorium doubles as an examination and convocation hall. A postgraduate block was built in the late 2000s.

Since 2012 provincial development grants by the Government of Punjab have added facilities for students. A dedicated bus service linking the campus with Bahawalpur's outskirts was inaugurated in November 2012.

== Former principals ==
- Babu Parson Kumar Bose
- Rana Muhammad Siddique

== Notable alumni ==
- Ahmad Nadeem Qasmi
- Mian Allah Nawaz, chief justice of the Lahore High Court
