= Farooq Azam Malik =

Pakistani politician

Member of the National Assembly of Pakistan
- In office 13 August 2018 – 25 January 2023
- Constituency: NA-170 (Bahawalpur-I)

Personal details
- Born: Bahawalpur, Punjab, Pakistan

Muhammad Farooq Azam Malik (Urdu: محمد فاروق اعظم ملک) is a retired Pakistani politician who had been a member of the National Assembly of Pakistan from August 2018 till January 2023.

In total, he has been elected as a member of the National Assembly of Pakistan 3 times. Some of his previous offices include Minister of Railways in the 1988 Pakistani general election and Mayor of Bahawalpur (1987).

== Political career ==
He was elected to the National Assembly of Pakistan from Constituency NA-170 (Bahawalpur-I) as a candidate of Pakistan Tehreek-e-Insaf in the 2018 Pakistani general election. He retired from politics in 2023.

== More Reading ==
- List of members of the 15th National Assembly of Pakistan
