= Sadiq Dane High School =

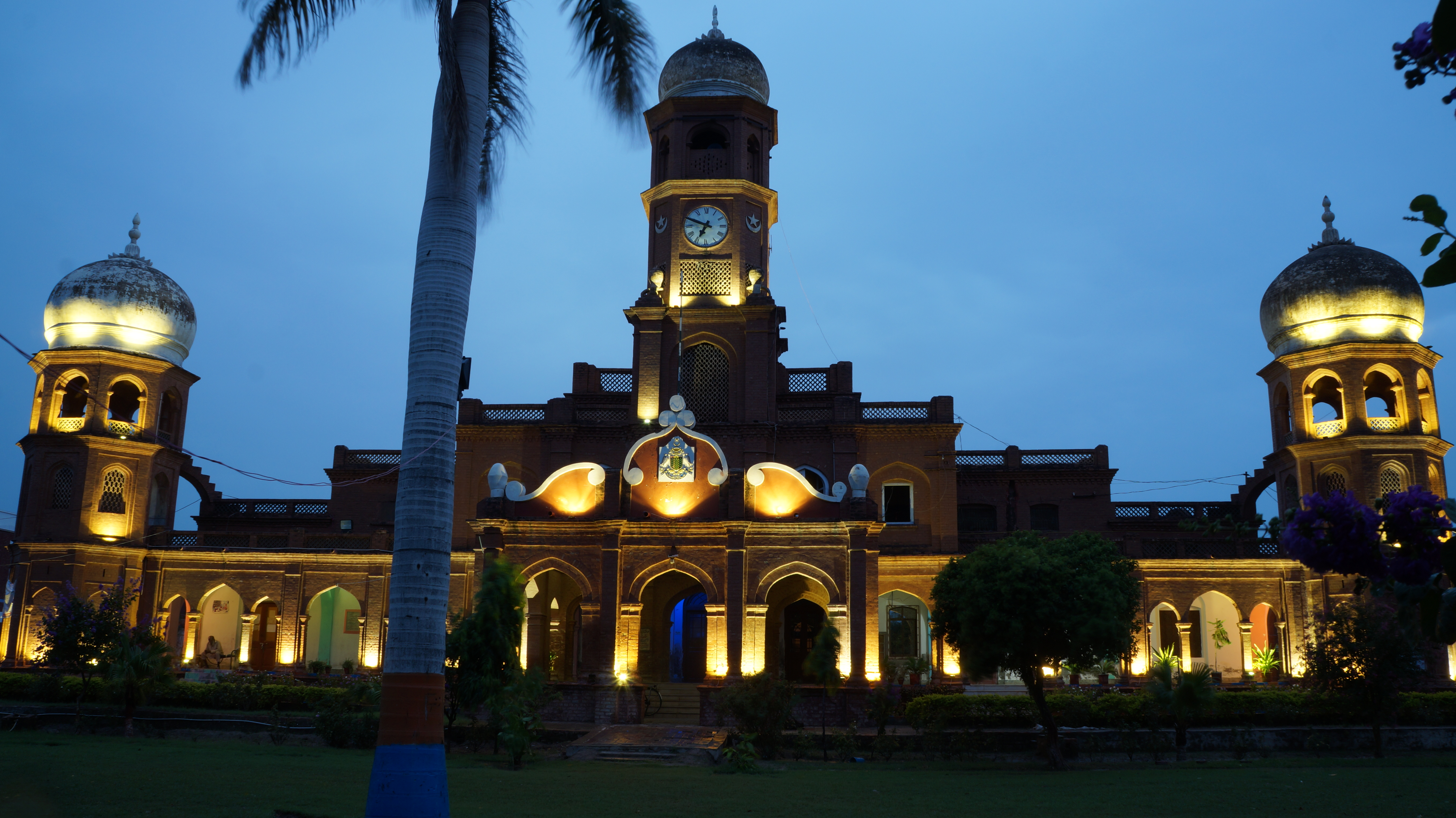

Location
- Bhabhrana, Bahawalpur, Punjab; Pakistan
- Coordinates: 29°23′39″N 71°41′06″E

Information
- Other name: S. D. High School
- Former name: Sadiq Darul Aqama
- Type: Public
- Established: 1911
- Founders: Louis Dane; Nawab of Bahawalpur

Government Sadiq Dane High School, also known as S. D. High School, is a high school located in Bahawalpur, Punjab, Pakistan. It is the largest school in Bahawalpur with over 2000 students currently enrolled. The building of the school is well known for its clocks.

== History ==
The S.D. High School building, completed in 1906, initially housed the first-ever college, named Sadiq Egerton College Bahawalpur, within the territory stretching from Bahawalpur to Sadiqabad and Mandi Mcleod Ganj in the Bahawalnagar district. It bore the names of the late Nawab Muhammad Sadiq Khan Abbasi and Robert Eyles Egerton, then Lt Governor of Punjab. Following the college's relocation in 1952-53, the building was repurposed for the S.D. High School, which moved from the nearby Government Technical High School. It was initially known as Sadiq Darul Aqama.

The building has a clock that was made by the Bing Bang Company of Britain. The school was inaugurated by Louis Dane on February 13, 1911, and is named after him and Nawab of Bahawalpur.
