= Olivier Roy (political scientist) =

French political scientist

Oliver Roy
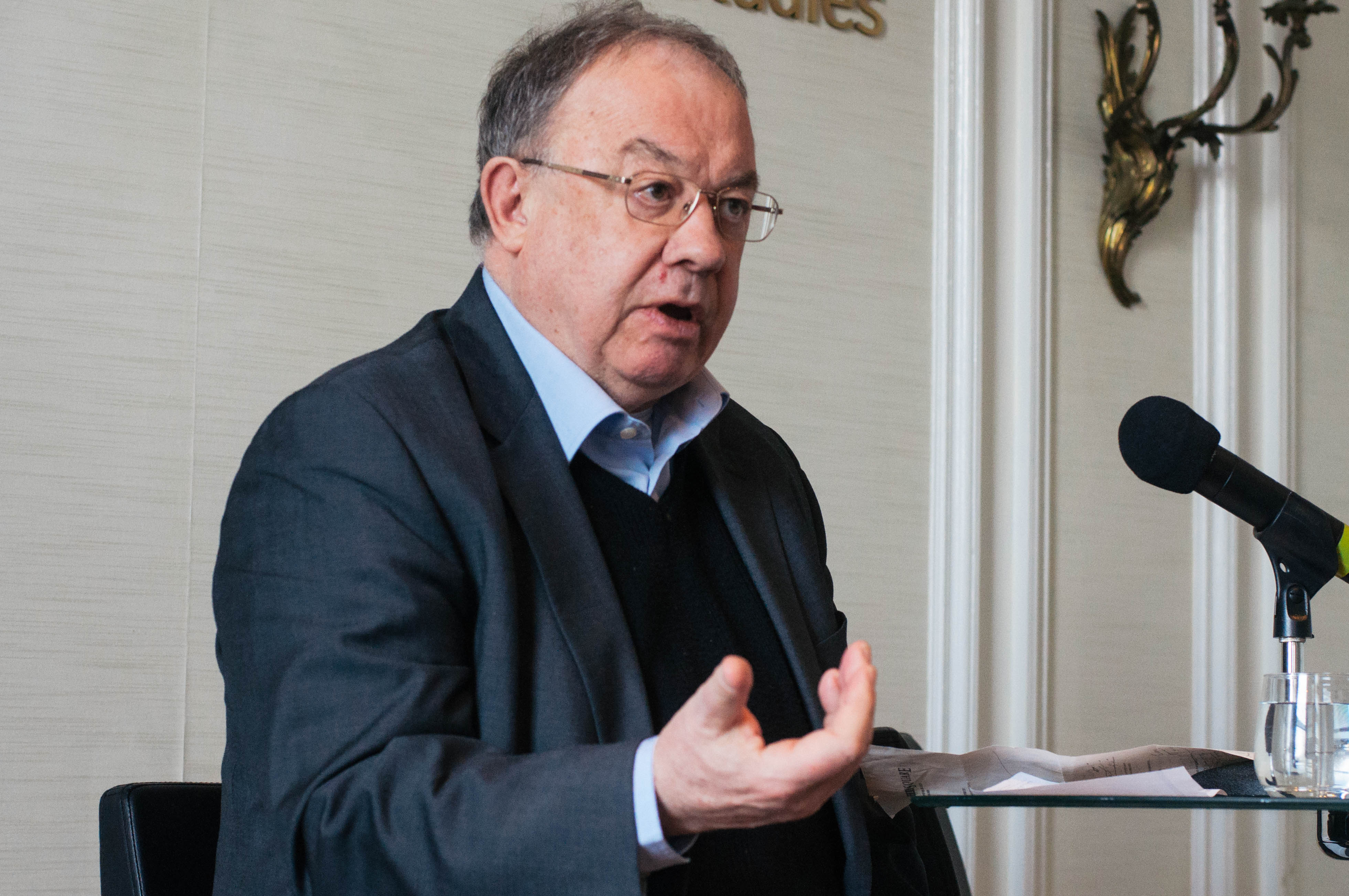
- Roy giving a lecture at Boston University in Boston, February 2017
- Born: 1949 (age 76–77); La Rochelle, France
- Occupation: Political scientist

Olivier Roy (born 1949 in La Rochelle) is a French political scientist and a professor at the European University Institute in Florence, Italy. He has published articles and books on secularization and Islam including "Global Islam" and The Failure of Political Islam. He is known to have "a different view of radical Islam" than some other experts. He sees it as peripheral and Westernized and part of a radicalized and "virtual", rather than pious and "actual", Muslim community. His most recent writings are about the Charlie Hebdo shooting and the November 2015 Paris attacks.

== Early life ==
Roy was born in 1949 in La Rochelle. He received an agrégation in philosophy and a master's degree in the study of the Persian language and civilisation in 1972 from the Institut national des langues et civilisations orientales (INALCO) in Paris. In 1973 he worked as a high school teacher. In the 1970s he was active in the Maoist movement "La Gauche Prolétarienne" (Proletarian Left). In 1996, he received his PhD in political science from the Institut d'études politiques de Paris (IEP) in Paris.

== Career ==
Roy was a research director at the French National Center for Scientific Research (CNRS) and a lecturer for both the School for Advanced Studies in the Social Sciences (EHESS) and the IEP. From 1984 to 2008, he was a consultant for the French Foreign Ministry. In 1988, he served as a consultant for the United Nations Office for Coordinating Relief in Afghanistan (UNOCA). Roy was a special Organization for Security and Co-operation in Europe (OSCE) representative to Tajikistan from April 1993 to February 1994. From then to October 1994, he was the head of the OSCE mission to Tajikistan.

Roy wrote books on Iran, Islam, and Asian politics, including Globalized Islam: The Search for a New Ummah, Today's Turkey: A European State? and The Illusions of September 11. He serves on the editorial board of the academic journal Central Asian Survey. His best-known book, L'Echec de I'Islam Politique (1992), translated as The Failure of Political Islam (1994), is a standard text for students of political Islam. Roy wrote widely on the 2005 civil unrest in France and rebutted the suggestion that the violence was inspired by religion. He argues that Islamism is merely a rubric under which troubled youth enact their violent inclinations, a view adamantly opposed by Roy's intellectual rival, Gilles Kepel. According to Judith Miller, in the wake of the September 11 attacks, Olivier argued that militant Islamism of the type represented by Al Qaeda had peaked and was fading into insignificance.

Roy's book Secularism Confronts Islam (Columbia, 2007) offers a perspective on the place of Islam in secular society and looks at the diverse experiences of Muslim immigrants in the West. Roy examines how Muslim intellectuals made it possible for Muslims to live in a secularized world while maintaining the identity of a "true believer." In 2010 he published Holy Ignorance, When Religion and Culture Part Ways, an analysis of religion, ethnicity and culture and the results when these part ways. After the Charlie Hebdo shooting he argued that most French Muslims were committed to prevent violence, and after the November 2015 Paris attacks, he wrote a strategic analysis of ISIS and the fight against it, which was published in The New York Times.

In 2017, Roy's assertion that jihadi terrorism is only loosely connected to Islamic fundamentalism was criticized by French scholar Gilles Kepel, who said that Roy neither speaks Arabic nor looks into the Salafi doctrine behind the jihadism. Roy stated, "I have been accused of disregarding the link between terrorist violence and the religious radicalisation of Islam through Salafism, the ultra-conservative interpretation of the faith. I am fully aware of all of these dimensions; I am simply saying that they are inadequate to account for the phenomena we study, because no causal link can be found on the basis of the empirical data we have available."

== Other activities ==
- Former European Council on Foreign Relations (ECFR), Member

== Bibliography ==
- Leibniz et la Chine. Vrin. 1972. ISBN 978-2-7116-0670-2.
- Afghanistan: Islam et modernité politique. Seuil. 1985.
- L'échec de l'Islam politique. Édition du Seuil. 1992. ISBN 978-2-02-014153-6.
- Roy, Olivier; Volk, Carol (1996). The Failure of Political Islam. Harvard University Press. ISBN 978-0-674-29141-6.
- Généalogie de l'islamisme; Paris Hachette, 1995
- Khosrokhavar, Farhad; Roy, Olivier (1999). Iran: comment sortir d'une révolution religieuse. Éd. du Seuil. ISBN 978-2-02-035891-0.
- The New Central Asia: The Creation of Nations. I.B.Tauris. 2000. ISBN 978-1-86064-278-4.
- Les illusions du 11 septembre: le débat stratégique face au terrorisme. Seuil. 2002. ISBN 978-2-02-055815-0.
- La Turquie aujourd'hui: un pays européen?. Encyclopaedia universalis. 2004. ISBN 978-2-85229-783-8.
- Zahab, Mariam Abou; Roy, Olivier (2004). Islamist Networks: The Afghan-Pakistan Connection. Columbia University Press. pp. 3–. ISBN 978-0-231-13364-7.
- Globalized Islam: The Search for a New Ummah. Columbia University Press. 2006. ISBN 978-0-231-13499-6.
- Secularism Confronts Islam. Columbia University Press. 1 January 2007. ISBN 978-0-231-51179-7.
- La Sainte Ignorance: Le temps de la religion sans culture. Seuil. 2013-03-18. ISBN 978-2-02-111494-2.
- Jihad and Death: The Global Appeal of Islamic State. Hurst Publishers. 2017-11-07. ISBN 978-1-84-904698-5.
- In Search of the Lost Orient: An Interview. Columbia University Press. 2017-11-07. ISBN 978-0-23-117934-8.
- The Crisis of Culture: Identity Politics and the Empire of Norms. Hurst Publishers. 2024. ISBN 9781911723059.
