= Constituency W-316 =

Provincial constituency of Punjab, Pakistan

W-316
- Woman Reserved constituency for the Provincial Assembly of Punjab

Current constituency

Constituency W-316 is a reserved Constituency for women in the Provincial Assembly of Punjab.

== See also ==
- Punjab, Pakistan
