= Fareed Gate =

One of the historic gates of the Old City of Bahawalpur, Pakistan

Coordinates: 29.395716°N 71.683302°E

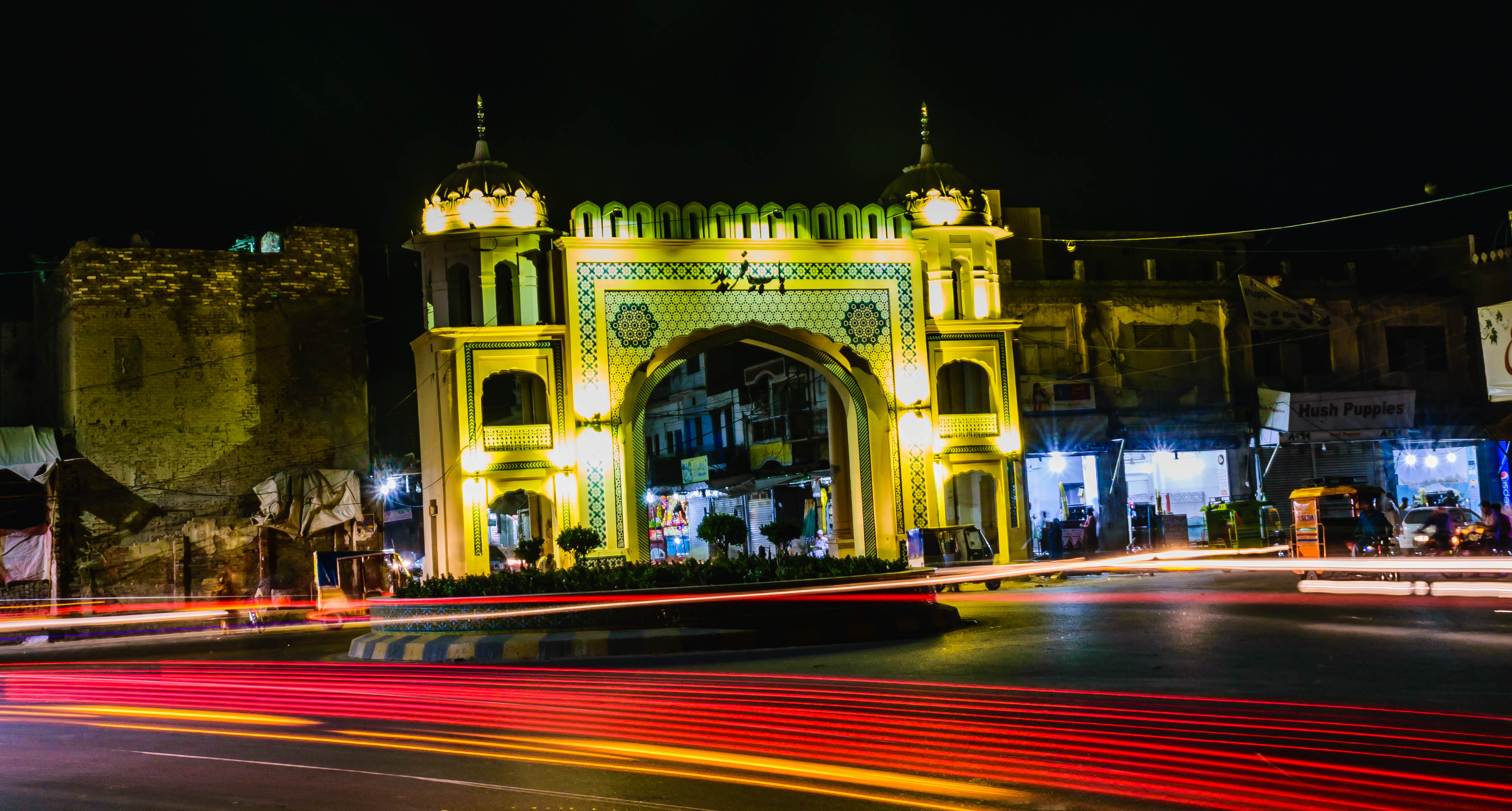
Fareed Gate in 2015

Fareed Gate (Urdu: باب فريد), also spelled as Farid Gate, is a historical gate of the old city of Bahawalpur, in Punjab, Pakistan.

== History ==
Fareed Gate is named after the 19th-century Sufi poet Khwaja Ghulam Farid.

Under a local beautification initiative, Farid Gate was selected for restoration. This followed an art project illuminating buildings along Circular Road with murals of local life. However, the renovation halted abruptly, leaving behind construction debris and traffic disruption. Additionally, a fountain at the site remains non-functional since its deactivation in 2011.
