= Mariam Abou Zahab =

American political scientist (1952–2017)

- Born: February 1952; Hon-Hergies, France
- Died: November 1, 2017 (aged 65); Paris
- Education: Instituts d'études politiques; Institut national des langues et civilisations orientales
- Scientific career
- Fields: Political science
- Workplaces: Instituts d'études politiques; Institut national des langues et civilisations orientales
- Doctoral advisor: Gilles Kepel

Mariam Abou Zahab (February 1952—November 2017) was a French political scientist, sociologist, and scholar of Islamic studies. She was an expert in the Politics of the Middle East, particularly Afghanistan and Pakistan. She was also a humanitarian aid worker in Afghanistan.

== Early life and education ==
Zahab was born Marie-Pierre Walquemanne in Hon-Hergies in February 1952. She attended secondary school in Valenciennes, and completed her university studies at the Institut national des langues et civilisations orientales and the Instituts d'études politiques in Paris, graduating in 1972.

== Career ==
Abou Zahab was a professor at the Instituts d'études politiques in Paris, and the Institut national des langues et civilisations orientales. She was also a researcher at the Centre de recherches internationales (Fr), and worked with the Cahiers d'études sur la Méditerranée orientale et le Monde Turco-Iranien on subjects relating to contemporary Afghanistan and Pakistan. She spoke Arabic, Urdu, Persian, Pashto, and Punjabi, and in addition to scholarly works she published works detailing her travels through Afghanistan, Iran, Pakistan, and India. These included time spent in Bangladesh during André Malraux's involvement with the liberation movement there, and she was in Beirut during the 1975 advent of the Lebanese Civil War, around which time she converted to Shia Islam.

Abou Zahab spent several years in Pakistan and Palestine as a militant, first taking the side of Bengali nationalists in East Pakistan, and then aligned with Yasser Arafat in the Palestine Liberation Organization. This latter activity drew the suspicion of French intelligence services.

Abou Zahab also worked with the non-governmental organization Afrane (Fr), and was involved in several aid missions during the Soviet–Afghan War.

All of Abou Zahab's scholarly works were published in the last 15 years of her life. She died in November 2017.

== Selected works ==
- Réseaux islamiques : la Connexion afghano-pakistanaise, with Olivier Roy (2002)
