= Mayo Hospital =

Mayo Hospital میو اسپتال

Geography
- Location: Lahore, Punjab, Pakistan

Organisation
- Affiliated university: King Edward Medical University

Services
- Beds: 2,765

History
- Founded: 1871

Links
- Website: www.mayohospital.gop.pk

Mayo Hospital (Punjabi, Urdu: میو اسپتال) is the largest Hospital of Pakistan located in Lahore, Punjab, Pakistan. King Edward Medical University, one of the oldest medical institutions in South Asia, is attached to Mayo Hospital. Mayo Hospital is located in the heart of Old Lahore, and provides free treatment to almost all admitted patients as part of a government policy. The hospital stretches over a land of 0.22 km^{2} .

It underwent a major overhaul recently, during which many of its departments were renovated to give the hospital a modern look. It includes the Accident and Emergency Department Building, the Paediatrics Department Building, and the Eye Department Building.

== History ==
The hospital building was completed in 1870 at a cost of Rs 150'000 and it began operating in 1871. The hospital is named after the then Viceroy of British India, "Richard Bourke, 6th Earl of Mayo" also locally known as Lord Mayo. This hospital was to serve the needs of the 70,000 people of Punjab at that time. The hospital started with three specialties (General Medicine, General Surgery, Eye & Ent). The architecture of the hospital is Italian, designed by Pudon and engineered by Rai Bahadur Kanahya Lal, one of the leading architects of that time. However, the architectural influence resembles medieval hospitals built during the Middle Ages. The additions between 1960 and early 1980 were designed by A. R. Hye. The main building of the hospital is one of the oldest buildings of the British Era in Pakistan.

The hospital buildings were built in the following order:

- Main Building of Mayo Hospital (Now inpatient department/Gharri Ward) in 1871
- AVH (Private) Block in 1891
- Institute of T.B. and Chest Medicine in 1920
- Out Patient Department in 1952
- Pediatrics Ward in 1974
- Institute of Ophthalmology in 1982
- Accidents & Emergency Block & Pediatric Surgery Block (present) in 1984
- Department of Physical Medicine and Rehabilitation in 2001
- Punjab Institute of Preventive ophthalmology (PIPO) in 2004
- Quaid-e-Azam Musafirkhana in 2004
- Surgical Tower in 2018
- North Medical Ward building in 2019

== Achievements ==
=== Free clinical services ===
Starting from 24 May 2003, following departments provide 100% free treatment (as long as the patient remains admitted in the hospital):

- Accident & Emergency Department
- Inpatient Departments of all Medical & Surgical Specialties
- Out Patient Departments of all Medical & Surgical Specialties

=== Free diagnostic services ===
All admitted patients are getting Free of Cost diagnostic Laboratory & Radiology Services.

=== Psychiatry department of Mayo Hospital Lahore designated status of psycho trauma Center for Punjab Province ===
The psychiatry department of Mayo Hospital Lahore has been designated status of Psycho trauma Center for province of Punjab by Prime Ministers National Advisory Council in the aftermath of killings at Army Public School, Peshawar killings in 2014. This center is created to conduct workshops on trauma, identify and train team of mental health professionals and develop modules for training.

=== Neurosurgery Department pioneers spinal cord stimulation in Pakistan ===
Pakistan's first Spinal Cord Stimulation surgery was done by Neurosurgery Department of King Edward Medical University / Mayo Hospital Lahore in August 2018. The team included Professor Shahzad Shams (Chairman Neurosurgery King Edward Medical University / Mayo Hospital Lahore), Dr Muhammad Tariq (Asst Prof Neurosurgery King Edward Medical University, Lahore), Dr Ammar Anwer (Research Fellow ANFN-DBS Pakistan) and Dr Rupesh Jung Raut (R 3, Neurosurgery Department King Edward Medical University / Mayo Hospital Lahore). The patient was suffering from phantom limb syndrome.

== Organization ==
Medical Superintendent heads the Hospital Management.

== Working conditions ==
On 4 August 2023, the nurses at the hospital protested about their work hours, claiming they were being treated in an unfair manner by the professors.

On 12 June 2023, an injured man brought to the hospital with bullet wounds was killed when three armed men entered the emergency room and shot him three times.

In June 2023, patients and staff reported a severe shortage in essential medicines, lab services, ventilators, and beds.
