= Rashid Aziz Khan =

Pakistani jurist

Chief Justice of the Lahore High Court
- In office 4 November 1997 – 2000

Justice of the Supreme Court of Pakistan
- In office 2000 – July 2001

Personal details
- Born: 1 September 1941
- Died: 29 November 2014 (aged 73)
- Profession: Jurist

Rashid Aziz Khan (1 September 1941 – 29 November 2014) was a Pakistani jurist who served as chief justice of the Lahore High Court and later as a judge of the Supreme Court of Pakistan. Before his elevation to the bench, he served as assistant advocate general, additional advocate general, and advocate-general of Punjab.

== Career ==
Khan started legal practice in 1964 and served as a lecturer at Himayat-e-Islam Law College, Lahore, from 1969 to 1976. In 1976, he was appointed assistant advocate-general of Punjab. He became additional advocate-general in 1979 and was promoted as advocate-general of Punjab in March 1984.

Khan was elevated to the Lahore High Court in March 1987. He became chief justice of the Lahore High Court on 4 November 1997. During his tenure, he inaugurated the Lahore High Court's official website in November 1997. He later served as a judge of the Supreme Court of Pakistan until July 2001.

In 1996, Khan served as a member of the Election Commission of Pakistan. After his judicial career, he also served as chairman of the National Industrial Relations Commission.
