= Quaid-e-Azam Medical College =

Medical college in Bahawalpur, Pakistan

Quaid-e-Azam Medical and Dental College قائد اعظم طبی کالج
- Motto: Success through perseverance
- Type: Public
- Established: 1971
- Affiliations: Pakistan Medical and Dental Council; University of Health Sciences, Lahore
- Principal: Prof. Dr. Soufia Farrukh
- Students: 1600
- Location: Bahawalpur, Punjab, Pakistan; 29°23′19″N 71°40′38″E
- Colours: Black & white
- Website: www.qamc.edu.pk

Quaid-e-Azam Medical College (Urdu: عظیم رہنما طبی دبستان, or QAMC) is a medical college in Bahawalpur, Pakistan.

== History ==
The medical college was founded on 2 December 1971 when its foundation stone was laid by the then Governor of Punjab, Lt Gen Attique-ur-Rehman (retd). The college is affiliated for clinical training to Bahawal Victoria Hospital as well as Civil Hospital Bahawalpur. The founding Principal was Prof Dr Nawab Muhammad Khan. Prof. Dr. Sofia Farrukh is the current principal of the college.

== Architecture ==
Designed by Abdur Rahman Hye, it was the first endogenously designed medical campus by a Pakistani architect and has the characteristics typical in A. R. Hye's style of architecture.

The design of the building incorporates natural climate control features, such as cross-ventilation, strategic placement of windows, and overhangs and courtyards to create shade. Additionally, the roof vaults, besides providing insulation, also allow the flow of air through the vault roof, bringing down ceiling temperatures. Hollow walls also provide insulation. This provides a natural protection against the hot and dry climate of Bahawalpur.

== Recognition and affiliations ==
The college is recognized by the following organizations:

- Pakistan Medical and Dental Council
- University of Health Sciences, Lahore

== Societies and Clubs ==
- Quaidians Dramatics Club And Movie Society(QDCAMS)
- Iqra Medical Society
- Quaidians Literary Society (QLS)

== Notable alumni ==
- Ashu Lal Faqeer, famous Seraiki poet
- Syed Waseem Akhtar, Member of Provincial Assembly of Punjab

== Gallery ==
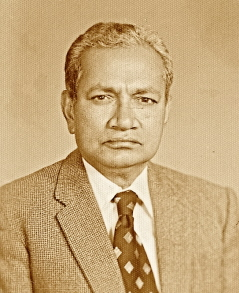
A. R. Hye Architect of Quaid e Azam Medical College

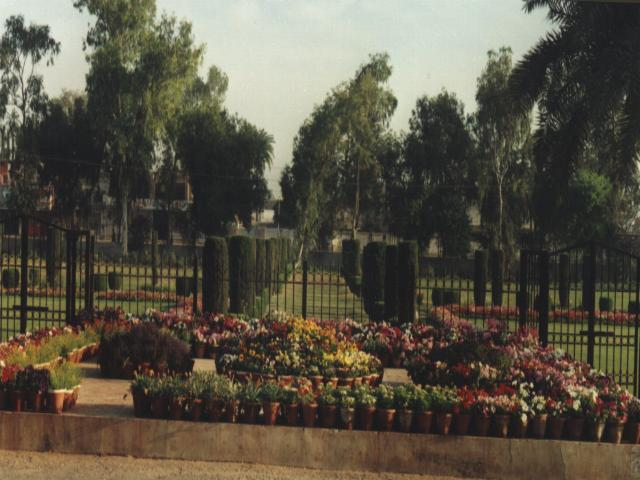
Quaid-e-Azam Medical College Landscaping

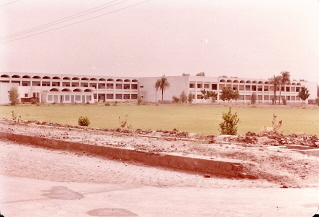
Side View

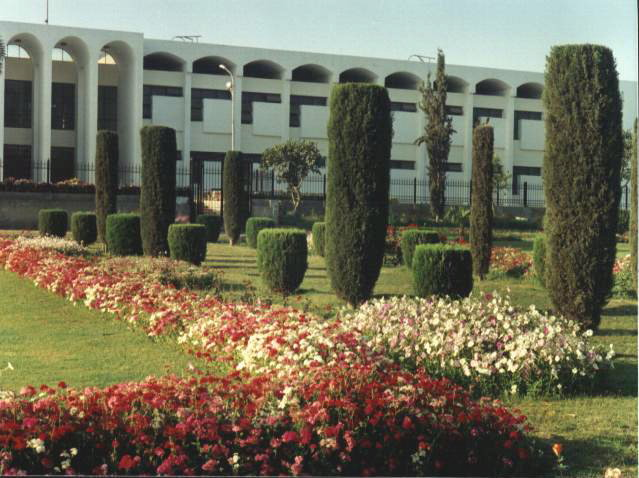
Quaid-e-Azam Medical College designed by A. R. Hye

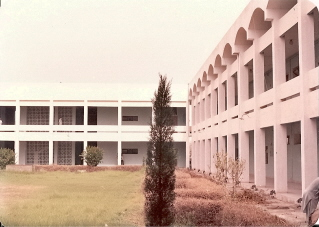
Courtyard
