= Bahawalpur Zoo =

- Interactive map of Bahawalpur Zoo
- 29.402764°N 71.681601°E
- Date opened: 1942; 84 years ago
- Location: Bahawalpur, Punjab, Pakistan
- Land area: 10 ha
- No. of animals: ~870; Birds: >600; Mammals: >180

Bahawalpur Zoo (Urdu: بہاولپور چڑیاگھر), established in 1942, is a 10-hectare (25-acre) zoological garden in Bahawalpur, Punjab, Pakistan. It is managed by the Government of Pakistan.

The zoo has occasionally bred and supplied wild cats, such as Asiatic lions and Bengal tigers, to other zoos in the country. It also has an aquarium and zoological museum with stuffed birds, reptiles and mammals.

== History ==
Bahawalpur zoo was set up in 1942 by the former Aamir of Bahawalpur, Sir Nawab Sadiq Muhammad Khan Abbasi. It was then named "Sher Bagh" (meaning "lion garden"). In 1955, the administrator of the zoo Dr.Ghulam Haider Sumra was transferred to the Department of Agriculture. From 1977 to 1982, the zoo remained under the control of the Department of the Live Stock Punjab. The Bahawalpur Zoo is the fourth biggest zoo in Pakistan, after Lahore Zoo, Karachi Zoo and Islamabad Zoo.

== Exhibits ==
The exhibits are a mix between old style cages and newer moated enclosures. One older exhibit houses a pair of domestic cats, jackals, and an Indian civet cat. Crocodiles are kept in a large outdoor enclosure. lions, tigers, and hyenas are housed in more modern moated enclosures. A large pond in the zoo is home to pelicans, cranes, and geese. Several peafowl are also on exhibit. Blackbuck, hog deer, nilgai, European red deer, chinkara, and European mouflon are all housed in large paddocks.

The zoo also includes a museum with stuffed animals, including what is claimed to be the last lion shot in the Punjab.

== Criticism ==
The zoo has received criticism various times for its neglect of animals often resulting in poor living conditions.

== Animals ==
Aves

- Budgerigar
- Chukar partridge
- Common pheasant
- Demoiselle crane
- Great white pelican
- Greylag goose
- Indian peafowl
- Rock pigeon
- Rose-ringed parakeet
- Silver pheasant
- Western crowned pigeon
- Wild turkey

Mammals

- Asiatic lion
- Asian black bear
- Bengal tiger
- Black Buck
- Chinkara (Indian gazelle)
- Chital (spotted deer)
- Hog deer
- Himalayan brown bear
- Llama
- Mouflon
- Nilgai (blue bull)
- Plains zebra
- Red deer
- Red-necked wallaby
- Rhesus macaque
- Sambar
- Small Indian civet

Reptiles

- Mugger crocodile
- Spur-thighed tortoise

== Conservation ==
This zoo has bred various threatened species of Asiatic lion, Asian black bear, Bengal tiger, blackbuck and hog deer. Others like chinkara (Indian gazelle), chital (spotted deer), and nilgai (blue bull) are also breeding successfully in the zoo.

== See also ==
- List of zoos in Pakistan
- List of parks and gardens in Pakistan
