= Sami Ullah Chaudhary =

Pakistani politician

Provincial Minister of Punjab for Food
- In office 27 August 2018 – 6 April 2020

Member of the Provincial Assembly of the Punjab
- In office 15 August 2018 – 14 January 2023
- Constituency: PP-246 (Bahawalpur-II)
- In office 1997–1999
- Constituency: PP-222 (Bahawalpur-V)

Personal details
- Born: October 21, 1968 (age 58) Bahawalpur, Punjab, Pakistan
- Party: PTI (2018-present)
- Other political affiliations: PMLN (1997-1999)

Sami Ullah Chaudhary (Urdu: سمیع اللہ چوہدری) is a Pakistani politician who was the Provincial Minister of Punjab for Food, in office from 27 August 2018 till 6 April 2020. He had been a member of the Provincial Assembly of the Punjab from August 2018 till January 2023. Previously he was member of the Provincial Assembly of the Punjab from 1997 to 1999.

== Early life and education ==
He was born on 21 October 1968 in Arain family in Bahawalpur, Pakistan.

He received a degree of Bachelor of Commerce from Commerce College, Bahawalpur in 1989.

== Political career ==
He was elected to the Provincial Assembly of the Punjab as a candidate of the Pakistan Muslim League (N) (PML-N) from PP-222 (Bahawalpur-V) in the 1997 Pakistani general election. He received 29,005 votes and Malik Habibullah Bhutta, a candidate of the Pakistan Peoples Party (PPP).

He was re-elected to the Provincial Assembly of the Punjab as a candidate of the Pakistan Tehreek-e-Insaf (PTI) from PP-246 (Bahawalpur-II) in the 2018 Punjab provincial election.

On 27 August 2018, he was inducted into the provincial Punjab cabinet of Chief Minister Usman Buzdar and was appointed Provincial Minister of Punjab for food.

On 6 April 2020 he resigned as the Food Minister of Punjab following the FIA reports on sugar and flour crisis suggesting that the Punjab Food Ministry was inefficient in handling the crisis.

He ran for a seat in the Provincial Assembly from PP-254 Bahawalpur-X as a candidate of the PTI in the 2024 Punjab provincial election.
