= Bahawalpur =

City in Punjab, Pakistan

Bahawalpur بہاول پور
- Metropolis
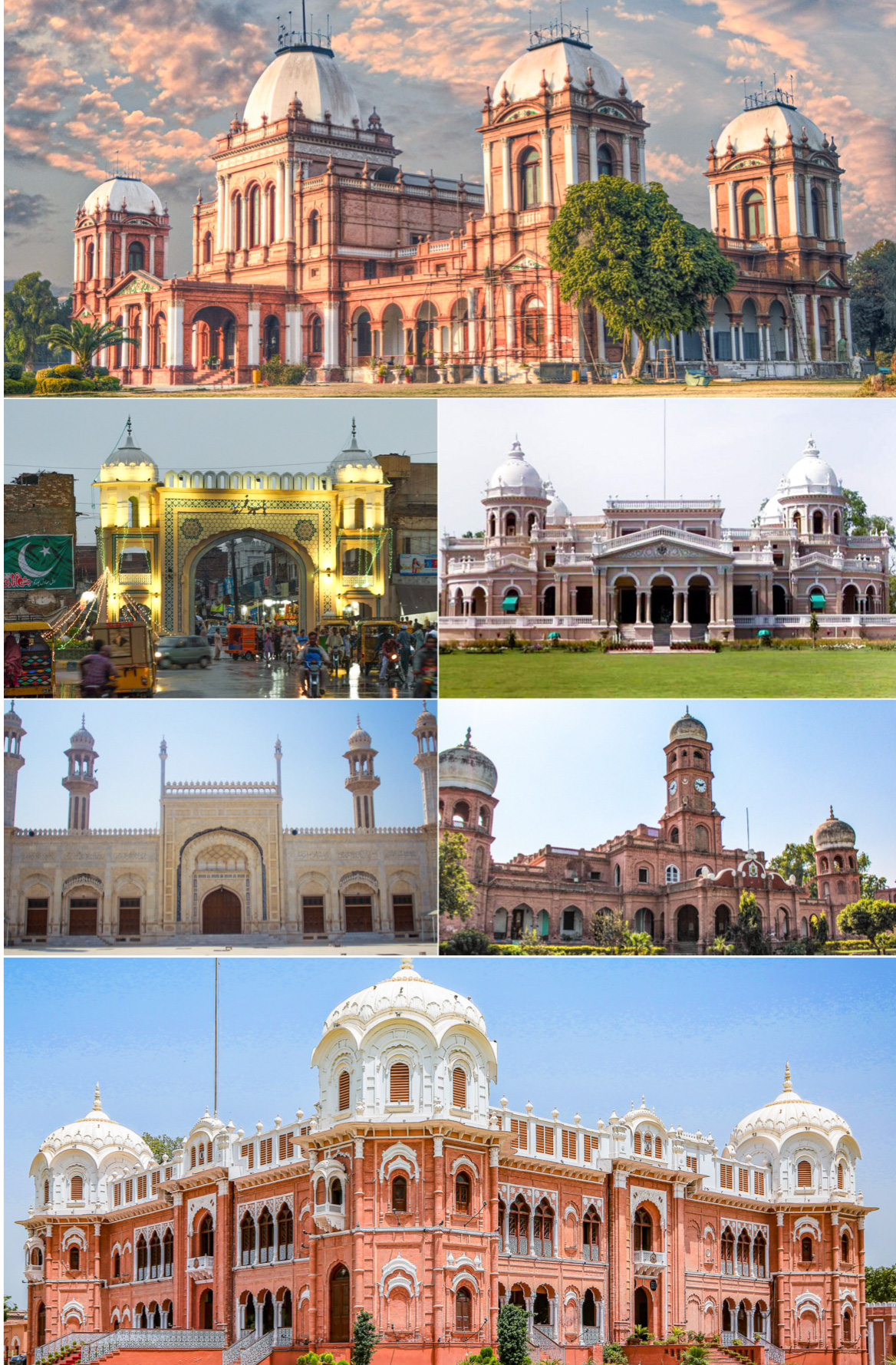
- Clockwise from top: Noor Mahal Palace, Gulzar Mahal, Sadiq Dane High School, Darbar Mahal Palace, Sadiq Mosque, Fareed Gate
- Nickname: City of Palaces
- Location of Bahawalpur Bahawalpur (Pakistan)
- Coordinates: 29°23′44″N 71°41′1″E
- Country: Pakistan
- Province: Punjab
- Division: Bahawalpur
- District: Bahawalpur
- Union councils: 21
- Established: 1748

Government
  - Type: Metropolitan Corporation
  - Mayor: Vacant
  - Commissioner: Ehtisham Anwar

Area
  - City: 246 km^{2} (95 sq mi)
- Elevation: 118 m (387 ft)

Population (2023)
  - City: 903,795
  - Rank: 13th in Pakistan
  - Density: 3,670/km^{2} (9,520/sq mi)
- Time zone: UTC+5 (PKT)
- Postal code type: 63100
- Area code: 062
- Website: Bahawalpur / Punjab Portal

Bahawalpur (Urdu: بہاول پور; Urdu pronunciation: [bəɦɑːwəlˈpuːɾ]) is a city in Punjab, Pakistan. It is the 13th most populous city of Pakistan and 8th most populous of Punjab. Bahawalpur is the capital of Bahawalpur Division.

Founded in 1748 by the Daudpotra family of Sindh, Bahawalpur was the capital of the former princely state of Bahawalpur, ruled by the Nawabs of Bahawalpur until 1955. The Nawabs left a rich architectural legacy, and Bahawalpur is known for its monuments dating from that period. The city lies at the edge of the Cholistan Desert, and serves as the gateway to the nearby Lal Suhanra National Park.

== History ==
Bahawalpur was among the 584 princely states before the Partition of India.

=== Early history ===
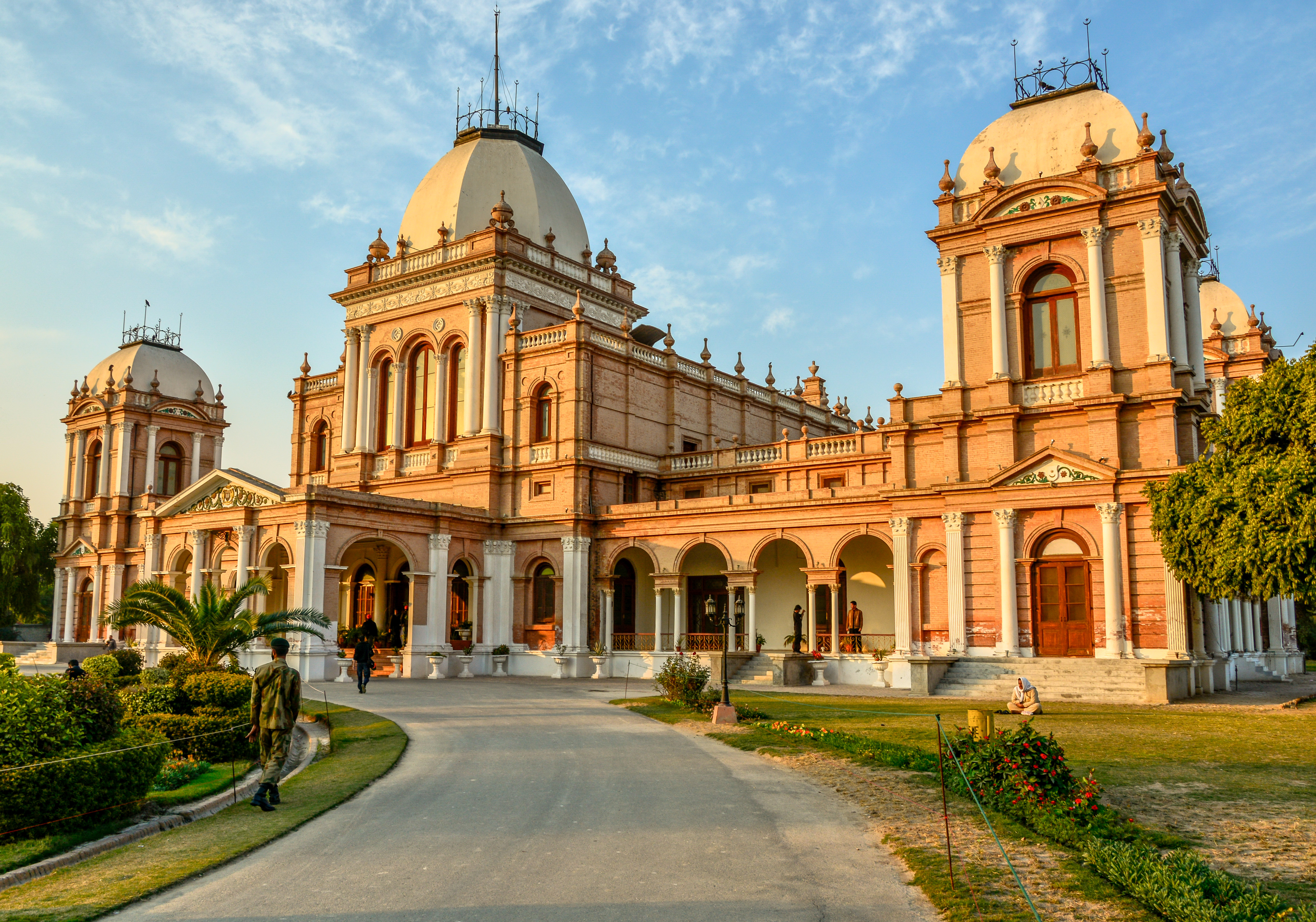
The Noor Mahal was the seat of the city's ruling Nawabs.

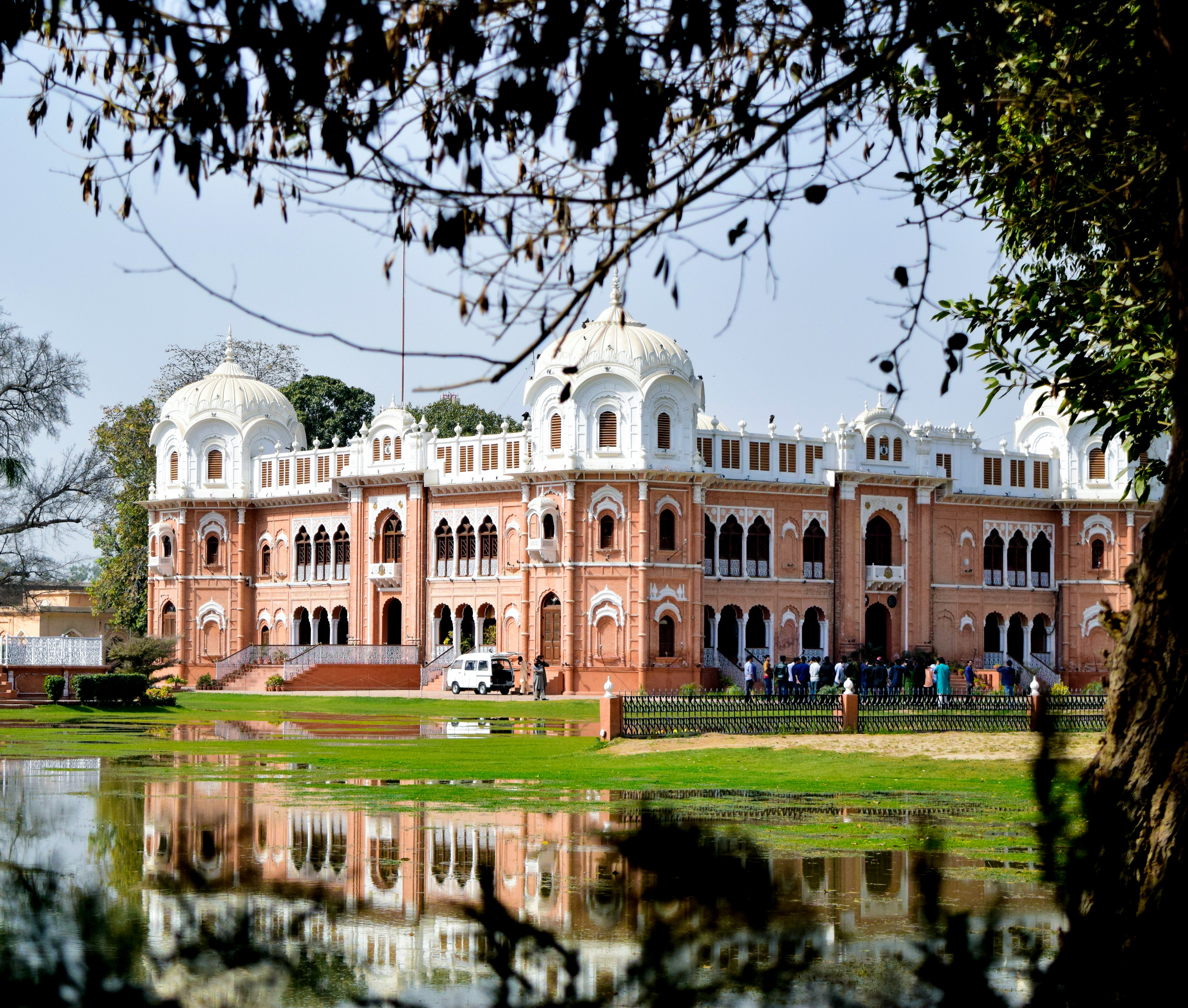
Darbar Mahal was built by Nawab Bahawal Khan V in 1905 as a palace for his wife.

Bahawalpur State was home to various ancient societies. It contains ruins from the Indus Valley Civilisation, as well as ancient Buddhist sites such as the nearby Patan minara. British archaeologist Sir Alexander Cunningham identified the Bahawalpur region as home of the Yaudheya kingdoms of the Mahābhārata. Prior to the establishment of Bahawalpur, Cholistan region's major city was Uch Sharif – a regional metropolitan centre between the 12th and 17th centuries that is renowned for its collection of historic shrines dedicated to Muslim mystics from the 12–15th centuries built in the region's vernacular style.

==== Establishment ====
Bahawalpur was established in 1748 by Nawab Bahawal Khan I, after he migrated to the region around Uch from Shikarpur, Sindh. Bahawalpur replaced Derawar as the clan's capital city. The city initially flourished as a trading post on trade routes between Afghanistan and central India.

==== Durrani attacks ====
In 1785, the Durrani commander Sirdar Khan attacked Bahawalpur city and destroyed many of its buildings on behalf of Mian Abdul Nabi Kalhora of Sindh. Bahawalpur's ruling family, along with nobles from nearby Uch, were forced to take refuge in the Derawar Fort, where they successfully repulsed further attacks. The attacking Durrani force accepted 60,000 rupees as nazrana or tribute, though Bahawal Khan later had to seek refuge in the Rajput states as the Afghan Durranis occupied Derawar Fort. Bahawal Khan returned to conquer the fort by way of Uch, and re-established control of Bahawalpur.

==== Princely state ====
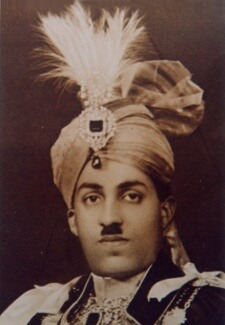
Sadeq Mohammad Khan V served as the last Nawab of Bahawalpur.

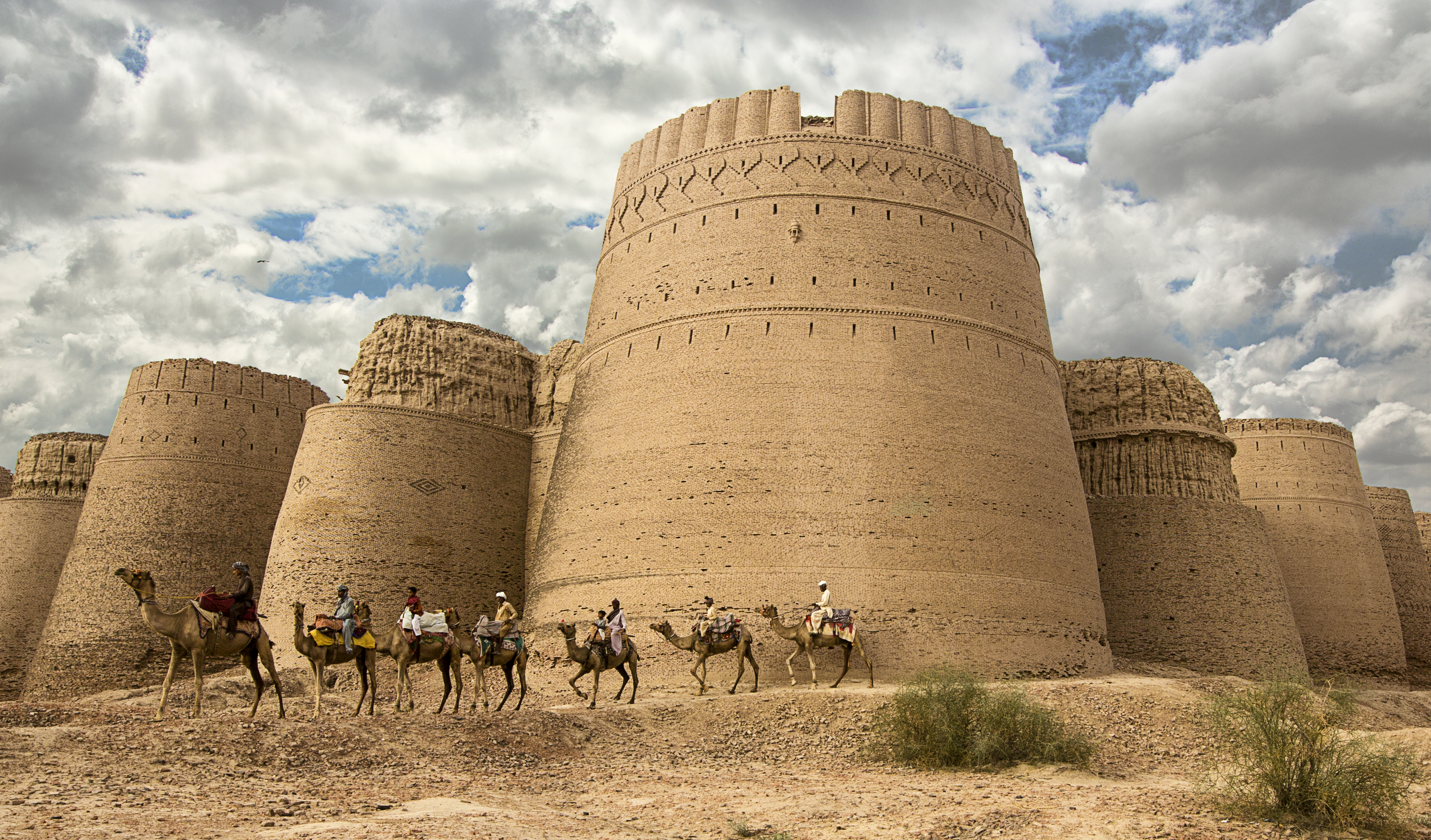
The ruling Abbasi family regarded the nearby Derawar Fort as a traditional bastion of their power.

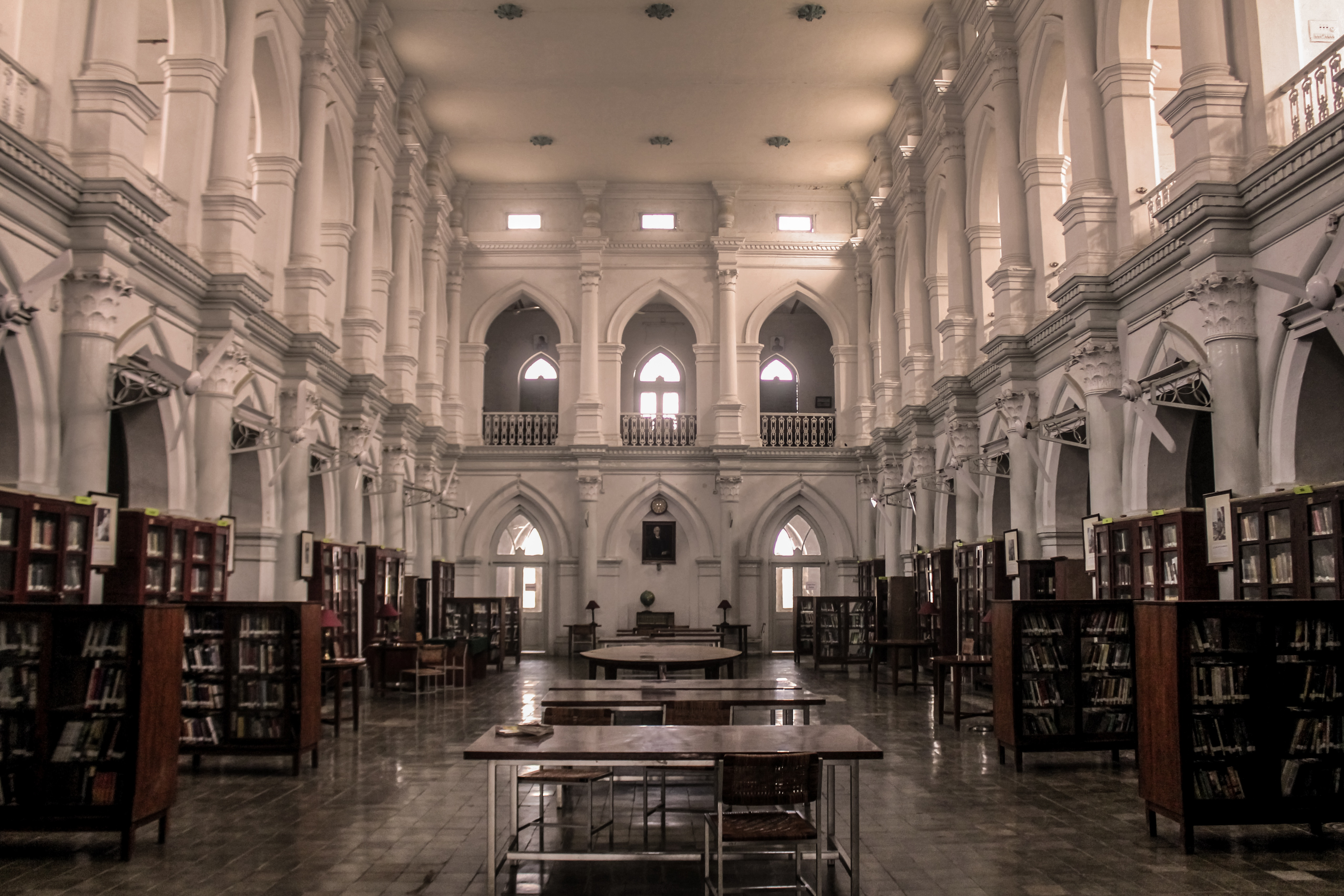
Bahawalpur's central library dates from the princely state period.

The princely state of Bahawalpur was founded in 1802 by Nawab Mohammad Bahawal Khan II after the break-up of the Durrani Empire, and was based in the city.

==== Sikh attacks and treaties with the British ====
In 1807, Ranjit Singh of the Sikh Empire laid siege to the fort in Multan, prompting refugees to seek safety in Bahawalpur in the wake of his marauding forces that began to attack the countryside around Multan. Ranjit Singh eventually withdrew the siege, and gave the Nawab of Bahawalpur some gifts as the Sikh forces retreated.

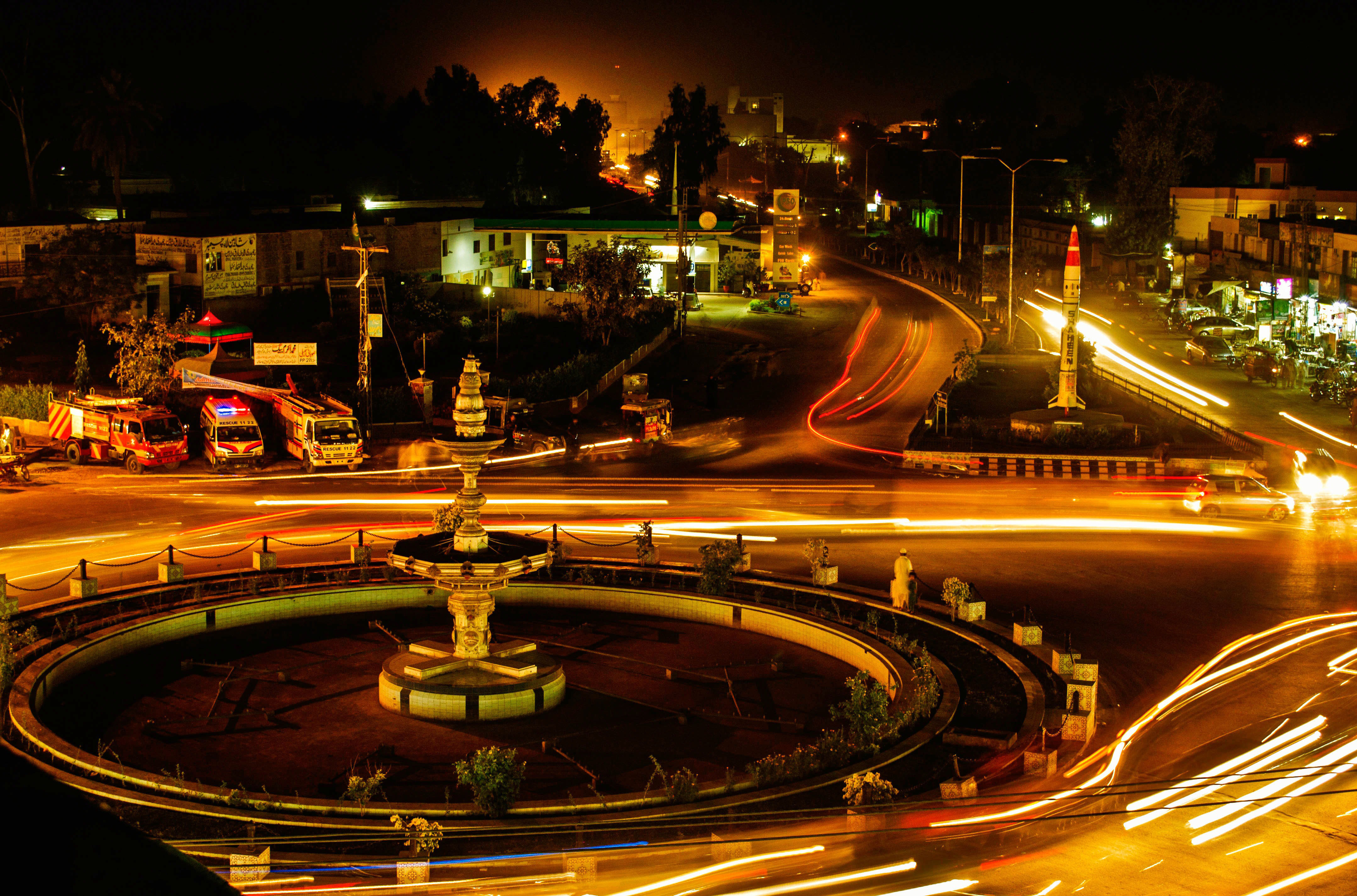
Fawara Chowk roundabout

Bahalwapur offered an outpost of stability in the wake of crumbling Mughal rule and the declining power of Khorasan's monarchy. The city became a refuge for prominent families from affected regions and also saw an influx of religious scholars escaping the consolidation of Sikh power in Punjab.

Fearing an invasion from the Sikh Empire, Nawab Mohammad Bahawal Khan III signed a treaty with the British on 22 February 1833, guaranteeing the independence of the Nawab and the autonomy of Bahawalpur as a princely state. The treaty guaranteed the British a friendly southern frontier during their invasion of the Sikh Empire.

==== Trade routes ====
Trade routes had shifted away from Bahawalpur by the 1830s, and British visitors to the city noted several empty shops in the city's bazaar. The population at this time was estimated to be 20,000, and was noted to be made up primarily of Hindus. Also in 1833, the Sutlej and Indus Rivers were opened to navigation, allowing goods to reach Bahawalpur. By 1845, newly opened trade routes to Delhi re-established Bahawalpur as a commercial centre. The city was known in the late 19th century as a centre for the production of silk goods, lungis, and cotton goods. The city's silk was noted to be of higher quality than silk works from Benares or Amritsar.

==== Increased British influence ====
An 1866 crisis over succession to the Bahawalpur throne markedly increased British influence in the princely state. Bahawalpur was constituted as a municipality in 1874. Bahalwapur's Nawab celebrated the Golden Jubillee of Queen Victoria in 1887 in a state function at the Noor Mahal palace. In 1901, the population of the city was 18,546.

===== The Second World War =====
At the outbreak of World War II in 1939, Bahawalpur's Nawab was the first ruler of a princely state to offer his full support and resources of the state towards the crown's war efforts.

=== Joining Pakistan ===
British Princely states were given the option to join either Pakistan or India upon British withdrawal from the Sub-Continent in August 1947. The city and the princely state of Bahawalpur acceded to Pakistan on 7 October 1947, under Nawab Sadiq Muhammad Khan Abbasi V Bahadur. Following independence, the city's minority Hindu and Sikh communities migrated to India en masse, while Muslim refugees from India settled in the city and the surrounding region.

=== Modern ===
Muhammad Zia-ul-Haq, the sixth president of Pakistan, died in an aircraft crash on 17 August 1988 in Bahawalpur near the Sutlej River after departing from the Bahawalpur Airport. Zia's close assistant Akhtar Abdur Rehman, American diplomat Arnold Lewis Raphel and 27 others also died in the crash.

In the years following the 2019 Pulwama attack, Pakistani authorities launched a crackdown on Jaish-e-Mohammed (JeM), leading to the takeover of several affiliated sites in Bahawalpur, including Madressatul Sabir and Jama-e-Masjid Subhanallah, by the Punjab government. During the 2025 India–Pakistan conflict, Bahawalpur was one of the cities targeted by Indian missile strikes under "Operation Sindoor", launched in response to the 2025 Pahalgam attack. Pakistani authorities confirmed that a strike occurred in the city, with reports of civilian casualties near a mosque formerly associated with JeM.

== District statistics ==
There are 6 tehsils in District Bahawalpur, with 109 union councils, 714 villages, and 5 municipal committees.

== Climate ==
Bahawalpur lies some 117 metres or 384 feet above sea level. The climate is dry; according to the Köppen-Geiger system, it is classified as semi arid (BSh). The rainfall is around 289 millimetres or 11.4 inches per year. The average annual temperature is 25.7 °C or 78.3 °F.

== Flora and Fauna ==
=== Flora ===
- Kikar
- Shisham
- Sufaida
- Neem
- Siris
- Toot
- Sohanjana

=== Fauna ===
- Blackbuck
- Indian hare
- Indian hog deer
- Nilgai
- Golden jackal

== Economy ==
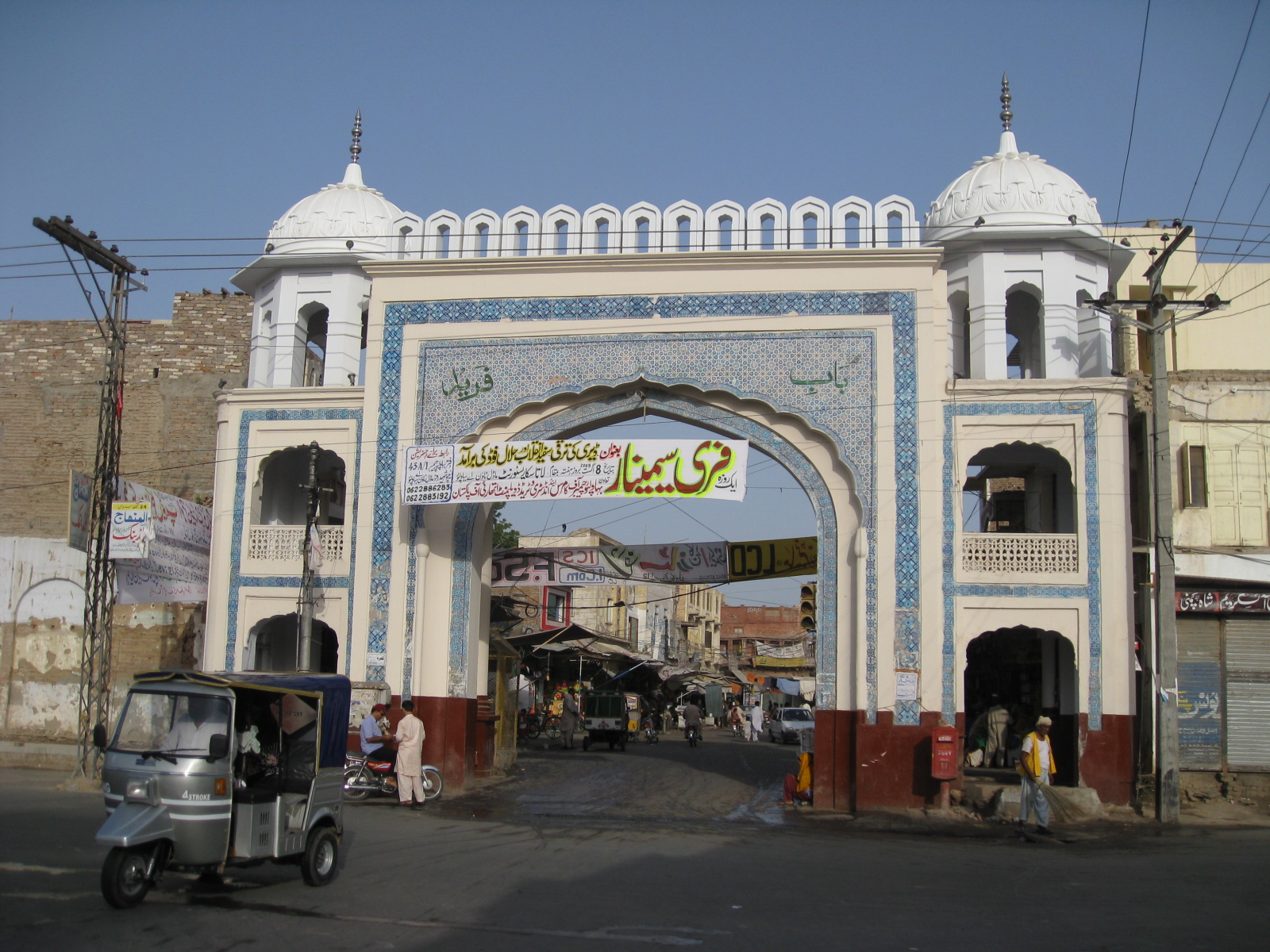
Fareed Gate

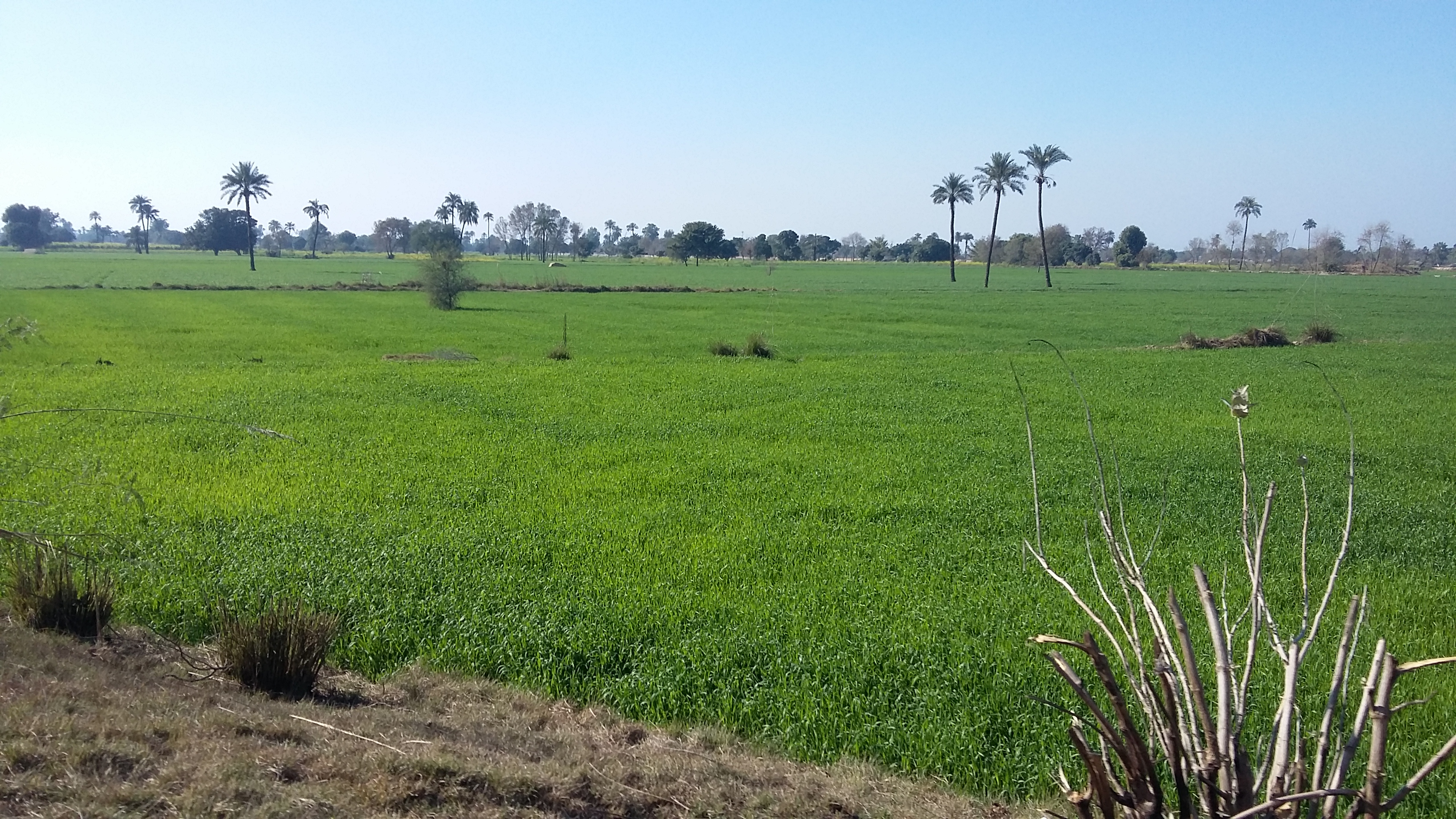
Alluvial plains form much of the immediate region around Bahawalpur.

The main crops for which Bahawalpur is recognised are cotton, sugarcane, wheat, sunflower seeds, rape/mustard seed and rice. Bahawalpur mangoes, citrus, dates and guavas are some of the fruits exported out of the country. Vegetables include onions, tomatoes, cauliflower, potatoes and carrots. Being an expanding industrial city, the government has revolutionised and liberalised various markets allowing the caustic soda, cotton ginning and pressing, flour mills, fruit juices, general engineering, iron and steel re-rolling mills, looms, oil mills, poultry feed, sugar, textile spinning, textile weaving, vegetable ghee and cooking oil industries to flourish. Sheep and cattle are raised for export of wool and hides.

=== Crafts ===
Bahawalpur is famous for its carpets, embroidery, and pottery. The Punjab government has set up a Craft Development Centre from where handicrafts can be purchased. These handicrafts are mostly manufactured in the Cholistan area. Following is the list of some of the mementos manufactured in the city:

- Flassi: It is made up of camel hair and can be used as a carpet or wall hanging
- Gindi: A colourful combination of cotton cloth with delicate needlework. It can be used as a blanket, carpet, or bed cover
- Changaries: Made up of palm leaves. They can be used as a decorative wall hanging or can be used to store chapatis / wheat bread
- Khalti: A kind of purse with multi-coloured threadwork
- Artwork: Special traditional embroidery done on kurta, chaddar/shawl etc.

== Demographics ==
Population

Historical population

Year	Pop.	±%
1941	40,000	—
1951	42,000	+5.0%
1961	84,000	+100.0%
1972	134,000	+59.5%

Year	Pop.	±%
1981	180,000	+34.3%
1998	356,626	+98.1%
2017	682,116	+91.3%
2023	815,202	+19.5%

According to the 2023 Census of Pakistan, Bahawalpur Metropolitan Corporation had a population of 815,202. 12.37% of the population is under 5 years of age. The city has a sex ratio of 103.66 males per 100 females and a literacy rate of 71.67%: 75.53% for males and 67.62% for females.

=== Languages ===
Languages by number of native speakers in Bahwalpur M. Corp (2023)
1. Saraiki (59.49%)
2. Punjabi (20.68%)
3. Urdu (16.89%)
4. Mewati (1.45%)
5. Others (1.49%)

As per the 2023 Census of Pakistan, the major tongue of the city is the Saraiki language, which attained plurality with 59.49%. This is followed by the Punjabi language at 20.68%, however the Punjabi dialects combined make up 80% of the city. Urdu is spoken by 16.89% of the population and Mewati is spoken by 1.45% of the population.

=== Religion ===
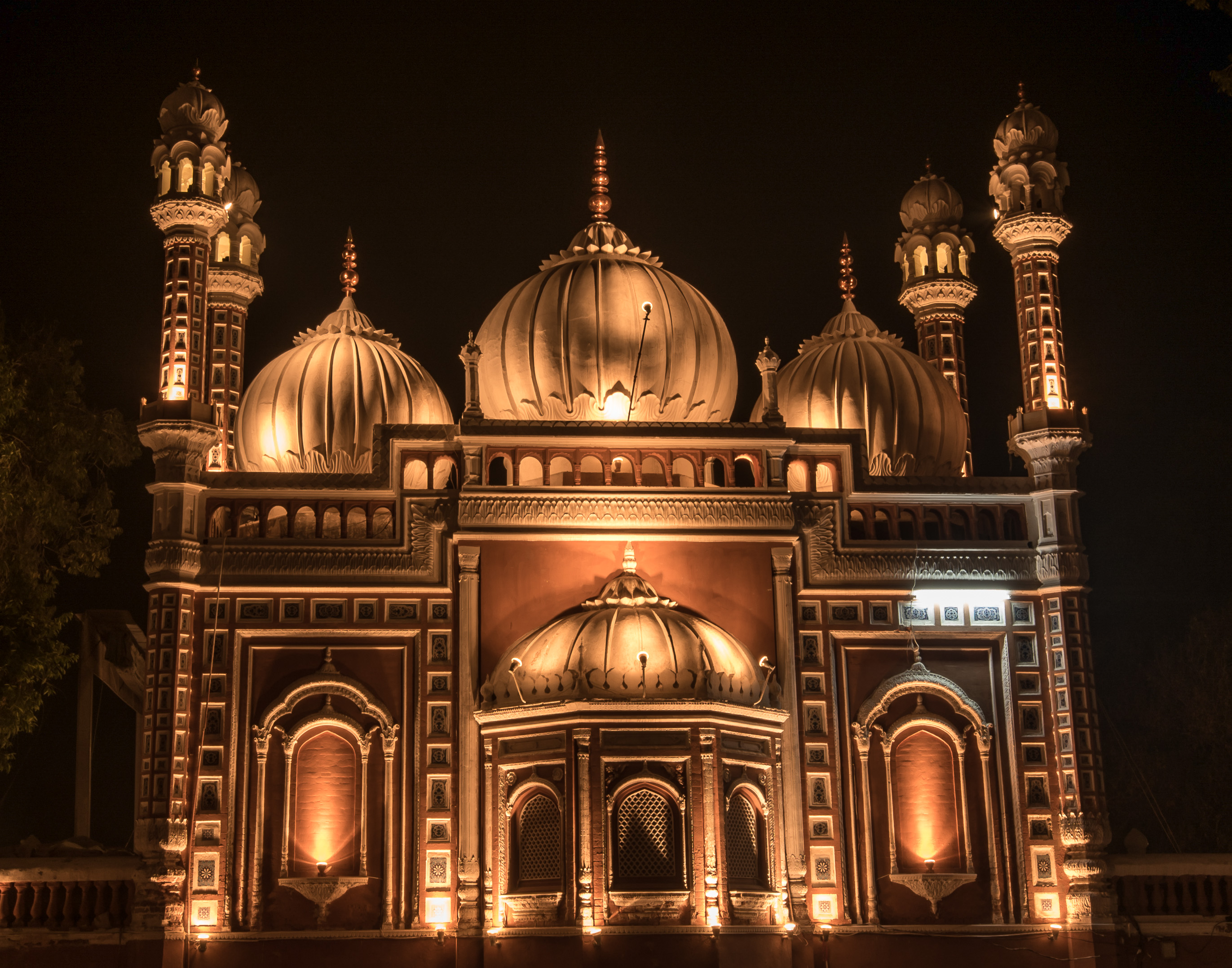
The Darbar Mahal mosque was built in an exuberant style.

Religion in Bahawalpur M. Corp. (2023)
Religion	Percent
Islam	98.14%
Christianity	1.62%
Other or not stated	0.24%

Bahawalpur emerged as a centre of Chishti Sufism following the establishment of a khanqa by Noor Muhammad Muharvi in the mid-18th century. Most residents are Muslims with a small minority being Hindus and Christians. There are about 2000 Christian families with one church, St. Dominic's Church built in 1962 by the Government of Punjab (the Dominican Convent School for girls and St. Dominican's Middle School for Boys were also built under the same project). Father Zafar Iqbal was the first Parish priest of the church until his death on 19 February 2009.

Religious groups in Bahawalpur City (1881−2023) (Note: 1881-1941: Data for the entirety of the town of Bahawalpur, which included Bahawalpur Municipality. 2017-2023: Bahawalpur City Tehsil (Bahwalpur Metropolitan Corporation) only)
Religious group	1881		1891		1901		1911		1921		1931		1941		2017		2023	
Religious group	Pop.	%	Pop.	%	Pop.	%	Pop.	%	Pop.	%	Pop.	%	Pop.	%	Pop.	%	Pop.	%
Islam	7,459	54.7%	11,109	59.36%	11,161	60.18%	11,395	61.88%	12,042	65.11%	13,735	65.58%	28,946	72.34%	670,119	98.24%	798,261	98.14%
Hinduism (Note: 1931-1941: Including Ad-Dharmis)	6,082	44.61%	7,450	39.81%	7,236	39.02%	6,879	37.36%	6,363	34.41%	7,166	34.22%	10,836	27.08%	1,811	0.27%	1,743	0.21%
Jainism	48	0.35%	0	0%	0	0%	0	0%	0	0%	0	0%	0	0%	—N/a	—N/a	—N/a	—N/a
Sikhism	43	0.32%	147	0.79%	135	0.73%	126	0.68%	75	0.41%	29	0.14%	208	0.52%	—N/a	—N/a	17	0%
Christianity	—N/a	—N/a	10	0.05%	14	0.08%	14	0.08%	14	0.08%	12	0.06%	25	0.06%	9,929	1.46%	13,202	1.62%
Zoroastrianism	—N/a	—N/a	0	0%	0	0%	0	0%	0	0%	1	0%	—N/a	—N/a	—N/a	—N/a	1	0%
Ahmadiyya	—N/a	—N/a	—N/a	—N/a	—N/a	—N/a	—N/a	—N/a	—N/a	—N/a	—N/a	—N/a	—N/a	—N/a	226	0.03%	99	0.01%
Others	3	0.02%	0	0%	0	0%	0	0%	0	0%	0	0%	0	0%	31	0%	99	0.01%
Total population	13,635	100%	18,716	100%	18,546	100%	18,414	100%	18,494	100%	20,943	100%	40,015	100%	682,116	100%	813422	100%

== Civic administration ==
Bahawalpur was announced as one of six cities in Punjab whose security would be improved by the Punjab Safe Cities Authority. 5.6 billion Rupees were allocated for the project, for the city to be modeled along the lines of the Lahore Safe City project in which 8,000 CCTV cameras were installed throughout the city at a cost of 12 billion rupees to record and send images to the Integrated Command and Control Centres.

== Infrastructure ==
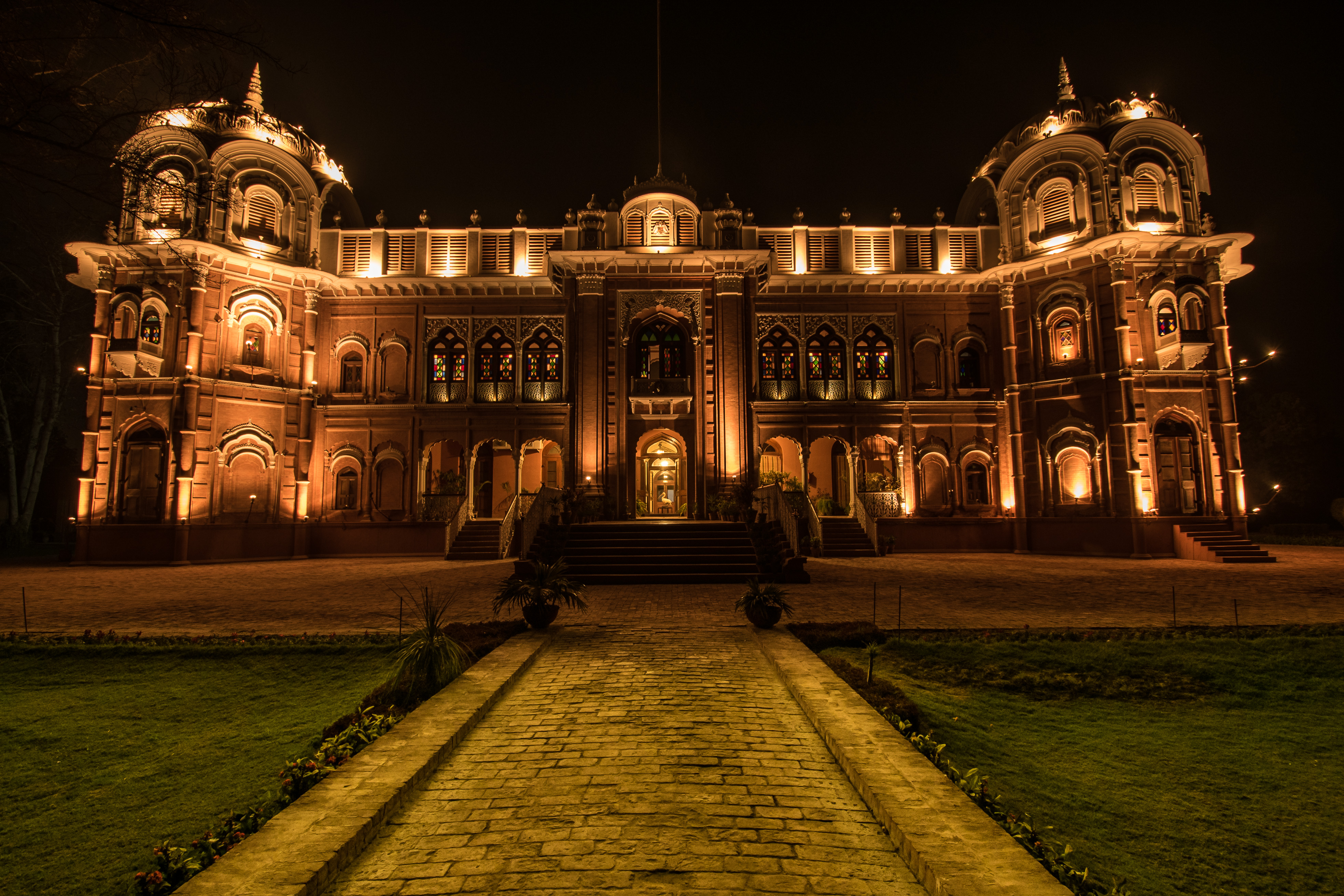
Darbar Mahal in Bahawalpur at Night

- The city's Noor Mahal palace was completed in 1875.
- In 1878, the 4,285-foot (1,306 m) long Empress Bridge was constructed as the first rail crossing over the Sutlej River.
- Two hospitals were established in the city in 1898, including the Bahawal Victoria Hospital.
- The Bahawal Stadium or (formerly) The Bahawalpur Dring Stadium.
- The Darbar Mahal was built in 1905.
- The Gulzar Mahal was built in 1909.

=== Bahawalpur Museum ===
The Bahawalpur Museum, established in 1976, is a museum of archaeology, art, heritage, modern history, and religion. It comes under the control of the Bahawalpur district government. The current director of the museum is Hussain Ahmed Madni. It has eight galleries:

1. Pakistan Movement gallery
2. Archaeological gallery
3. Islamic gallery; manuscripts, inscriptions, and Quranic documents
4. Cultural heritage gallery
5. Art gallery
6. Coins gallery
7. Cholistan gallery
8. Nawab Bahawal Memorial gallery

=== Bahawalpur Zoo ===
The Bahawalpur Zoo, established in 1942, is a 25-acre (10 ha) zoological garden. It is managed by the Government of Pakistan.

The zoo has occasionally bred and supplied wild cats, such as Asiatic lions and Bengal tigers, to other zoos in the country. It also has an aquarium and zoological museum with stuffed birds, reptiles, and mammals. The Bahawalpur Zoo is the fourth biggest zoo in Pakistan, after Lahore Zoo, Karachi Zoo and Islamabad Zoo.

=== Railway Station ===
- Bahawalpur Railway Station is located in Bahawalpur city at an elevation of 117 metres. It is one of the major railway stations of Pakistan Railways on the Karachi-Peshawar main line.
- The station is staffed and has advance and current reservation offices.
- In 2016, the Railways Minister Khawaja Saad Rafique announced that PKR. 280 million will be spent on the construction of a Model Railway Station in Bahawalpur.
- The routes linked Bahawalpur to the cities of Karachi, Lahore, Rawalpindi, Peshawar, Quetta, Multan, Faisalabad, Sargodha, Sialkot, Gujranwala, Hyderabad, Sukkur, Jhang, Rahim Yar Khan, Nawabshah, Attock, Sibi, Khanewal, Gujrat, Rohri, Jacobabad, and Nowshera.

=== Lal Suhanra National Park ===
Lal Suhanra is a national park in Pakistan. The park itself is situated some 35 kilometres east of Bahawalpur. It is one of South Asia's largest national parks and is a UNESCO declared Biosphere Reserve. Lal Sohanra is notable for the diversity of its landscape, which includes desert, forest, and wetland ecosystems.

== Education ==
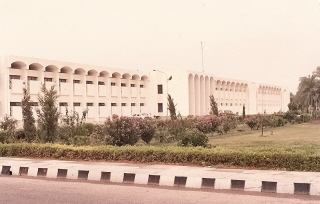
Campus Building, Islamia University of Bahawalpur (2009)

Bahawalpur's Sadiq Egerton College was founded in 1886. The first university, Islamia University was founded as Jamia Abbasia in 1925. The city's Quaid-e-Azam Medical College was founded in 1971. The District has an overall literacy rate of 48% with a total of 1662 schools and 24 colleges.

== Transportation ==
Local transportation vehicles include buses, cars, motorbikes, and rickshaws.

=== N-5 ===
Pakistan's longest national highway, N-5, also passes through the city, connecting Bahawalpur to Karachi and Lahore.

=== Railroad ===
The railway connects Bahawalpur with the cities of Karachi, Lahore, Rawalpindi, Peshawar, Quetta, Multan, Faisalabad, Sargodha, Sialkot, Gujranwala, Hyderabad, Sukkur, Jhang, Rahim Yar Khan, Nawabshah, Attock, Sibi, Khanewal, Gujrat, Rohri, Jacobabad, and Nowshera.

== Sports ==
Bahawal Stadium or (formerly) The Bahawalpur Dring Stadium is a multi-purpose stadium in the city. It hosted a sole international match, a test match between Pakistan and India on 15 and 18 January 1955. Motiullah hockey stadium is in the Bahawal Stadium and is used for various national and international hockey tournaments in the country. Aside from the cricket ground, it has a gym and a pool facility for citizens. There are also tennis courts, under the administration of the Bahawalpur Tennis Club, and a 2-kilometre jogging track around the football ground.

== Notable people ==
- Art Malik, film and television actor
- Samiullah Khan, former field hockey player
- Durdana Ansari, former journalist, presenter and producer at the BBC World Service,
- Muhammad Adil, Pakistani footballer
- Nawab Salahuddin Abbasi, former member of the National Assembly of Pakistan
- Sami Ullah Chaudhary, Member of the Provincial Assembly of the Punjab
- Saqib Sameer, television and theater actor and writer
- Muhammad Farooq Azam Malik, member of the National Assembly of Pakistan
- Murtaza Hassan, Pakistani comedian and stage actor
- Usman Tariq, Pakistani cricketer
- Masood Azhar, founder and leader of militant organisation Jaish-e-Mohammed
- Abdul Rauf Azhar, Jaish-e-Mohammed leader, brother of Masood
- Abdul Rehman Makki, leader of the Jamaat-ud-Dawah and Lashkar-e-Taiba

== See also ==
- Bahawalpur Museum
- Bahawalpur Zoo
- List of educational institutions in Bahawalpur
- List of cities in Pakistan
  - List of cities in Punjab, Pakistan
  - List of cities in Sindh
  - List of cities in Khyber Pakhtunkhwa
  - List of cities in Balochistan
  - List of cities in Azad Kashmir
  - List of cities in Gilgit-Baltistan

== Bibliography ==
- Moj, Muhammad (2015), The Deoband Madrassah Movement: Countercultural Trends and Tendencies, Anthem Press, ISBN 978-1-78308-389-3
- Talbot, Ian (2015), "Introduction", in Roger D. Long; Gurharpal Singh; Yunas Samad; Ian Talbot (eds.), State and Nation-Building in Pakistan: Beyond Islam and Security, Routledge, pp. 1–, ISBN 978-1-317-44820-4
- Zahab, Mariam Abou; Roy, Olivier (2004) [first published in French in 2002]. Islamist Networks: The Afghan-Pakistan Connection. Translated by King, John. C. Hurst & Co. Publishers. ISBN 978-1-85065-704-0.
