= List of tank truck fires and explosions =

This is a list of notable tank truck fires and explosions.

== 1960s ==
=== Toledo, Ohio, United States (1961) ===
On 10 June 1961 a Standard Oil tank truck carrying 7,900 gallons of gasoline traveling through Toledo, Ohio rolled over and the gasoline that spilled caught fire and exploded killing four firefighters and injuring 11 more. Around eighty people were injured, thirty of whom were children.

== 1970s ==
=== Monte Chingolo, Argentina (1975) ===
On 23 December 1975, the People's Revolutionary Army (ERP), an Argentine Marxist–Leninist guerrilla, launched an assault on the 601st Arsenal Battalion, the largest in Argentina, in the town of Monte Chingolo, 8.7 mi (14 kilometres) from Buenos Aires. As part of the attack the ERP spilled diesel oil from a tank truck and set it on fire.

=== Alcanar, Spain (1978) ===
The Los Alfaques disaster was a tank truck explosion that occurred near a holiday campsite on Tuesday 11 July 1978 in the municipality of Alcanar, Spain, near the town of Sant Carles de la Ràpita. The exploding truck, which was carrying 23 tons of highly flammable liquefied propylene, killed 215 people and severely burned 200 more. Several individuals from the company that owned the vehicle were prosecuted for criminal negligence. The accident resulted in new legislation in Spain, restricting the transit of vehicles carrying dangerous cargo through populated areas to night time only.

== 1980s ==
=== Memphis, Tennessee, United States (1988) ===
On 23 December 1988, a tank truck carrying liquefied propane on the Interstate 40 in Memphis, Tennessee, skidded from a ramp and rolled over. A small puncture released a vapor cloud that ignited in a boiling-liquid expanding-vapor explosion, creating a fireball 700 feet (210 m) in diameter. The tank was propelled into a nearby duplex, starting another fire. A total of nine people were killed, and another ten were injured.

== 1990s ==
=== Bangkok, Thailand (1990) ===
A major gas explosion took place on New Phetchaburi Road in Bangkok, Thailand, on 24 September 1990, when a liquefied petroleum gas tank truck crashed on an expressway exit. Large explosions and fires burned through 51 shop-houses for over 24 hours. 88 people died, 36 were injured and 67 cars were destroyed, making it one of the deadliest man-made disasters in Thailand.

== 2000s ==
=== Ibadan, Nigeria (2000) ===
The Ibadan tank truck explosion was one of the worst ever multi-vehicle accidents, killing between 100 and 200 people near Ibadan, Oyo State, Nigeria. It occurred on 5 November 2000. Estimates of casualties in the disaster remain imprecise. The police and other rescue services did not offer any assistance until sometime after the blast, and so numerous bodies were removed by relatives or volunteer rescuers and privately buried, whilst others were cremated in the fire. Most sources simply give a vague "over 100 dead" despite the official count of 96 recovered bodies and offer statements that "the final death toll could be much higher". What is certain is that local hospitals were totally swamped with hundreds of badly injured burn victims, creating a major crisis in the country's health service, which simply could not cope with so many badly injured patients in this area. The Nigerian police reported that they had recovered 115 destroyed vehicles from the roadway in the aftermath of the accident, implying a substantially higher death toll than initially quoted. Later sources however are restricted to using high round figures rather than accurate data, with Namibian sources reporting 150 killed, whilst Indian newspapers suggesting 200 died. Clearly the real figure is not known and never will be known, because of the failure of the authorities to deal effectively with the crisis. Their failure to do so stirred a serious and violent controversy in Nigeria.

The crash was surrounded by major controversy because in the previous four months over 150 people had been killed in high profile crashes involving gasoline tank trucks and buses. These crashes had led to such incidents as the Abuja bus crash riots, in which four more people had been killed, as well as growing resentment of the police and civil authorities who failed to take any responsibility for the country's appalling road safety record. The reason for the police absence was complicated. The unit with jurisdiction in the area was the Osun State Police, who had been the subjects of numerous corruption complaints. According to local sources, the reason that so many cars were lined up on the motorway before the crash was that the State Police were exacting a toll from motorists from an impromptu roadblock they had set up. This protection racket was what locals said led to the disaster because it caused a jam at an unusual place, causing the tank truck driver to brake suddenly, fail, and crash. The State Police denied the charges, instead insisting that the jam was due to roadworks, and that there was not one single police officer in the district at the time of the crash. The police claimed that when one of their vehicles arrived at the still blazing accident site shortly after the crash, it was attacked by a furious mob, set alight and destroyed, the four occupants escaping only after receiving a beating.

=== Mihăilești, Romania (2004) ===
TV report after the Mihăilești explosion

On 24 May 2004, in the village of Mihăilești, Buzău County, Romania, a tank truck loaded with ammonium nitrate rolled over and caught fire before exploding an hour later killing at least 18 people and injuring 13 others.

At 4:57 am local time, a truck loaded with 20 tons of ammonium nitrate rolled over on the express road E85 connecting Bucharest with Moldavia. Soon after the accident, the truck caught fire, so the driver immediately called the emergency number. Two fire trucks arrived at the scene 20 minutes later and started putting out the fire. A TV crew also arrived and started filming for a news program. Meanwhile, curious villagers gathered around the accident site. At 5:47 am, a small explosion took place in the cabin of the truck, followed two minutes later by a larger explosion, killing seven firefighters, the TV crew (Ionuț Barbu and Elena Popescu from Antena 1), several villagers and the truck driver, totalling 18 people; 13 others were injured. Of the 18 killed, two people (the truck driver and one of the firefighters) had to be identified by means of DNA testing. The explosion left behind a 6.5 meter deep crater, scattered human remains and debris over a several hundred meters radius, and caused damage amounting to about 70,000 euros.

Following this event, safety regulations for the transport of chemical substances were improved and ammonium nitrate was classified as a hazardous chemical compound. Ion Gherghe, the director of the Doljchim plant which produced the ammonium nitrate, and the managers of the two companies involved in the transport of this substance without safety measures, Mihai Gună and Ionel Ionuț Neagoe were charged with homicide by negligence and destruction of property. All were found guilty and sentenced to four years in jail, as well as the payment of compensations to the victims' families.

=== Nosratabad, Iran (2004) ===
On 24 June 2004, a gasoline tank truck exploded near Iran's border with Afghanistan, resulting in at least 90 fatalities and 114 injuries. The disaster occurred when the truck lost control and collided with a bus at the Nosratabad police checkpoint, located about 110 kilometres (68 mi) west of Zahedan.

=== Molo, Kenya (2009) ===
A fire occurred in Molo, Kenya, on 31 January 2009, and resulted in the death of at least 113 people and critical injuries to over 200 more. The incident occurred when fuel spilled from an overturned truck burst into flames as onlookers attempted to obtain remnants of the spilled fuel for personal use. Rescuers suggested the cause to be static electricity, a discarded cigarette, or an individual angered at a police blockade who sought vengeance. Police have described the carnage as Kenya's worst disaster in recent times, occurring in a country hit by frequent fuel shortages and just days after a supermarket fire killed 25.

=== Kapokyek, Kenya (2009) ===
In June 2009 a fuel tank truck fire killed at least four and injured nearly 50 people at Kapokyek village near Kericho, Kenya. The victims were siphoning fuel from the tank truck that had fallen off the road. The fire was the second such disaster in Kenya that week, following the deaths of at least 25 people in a Nairobi supermarket when a branch of Nakumatt caught fire. The Kenyan media has been criticizing the government for its poor safety standards and inadequate disaster preparation. Following that blaze, the Daily Nation reported that Nairobi's three million inhabitants were served only by one fire station situated close to a traffic-choked business district.

== 2010s ==
=== Sange, Democratic Republic of the Congo (2010) ===
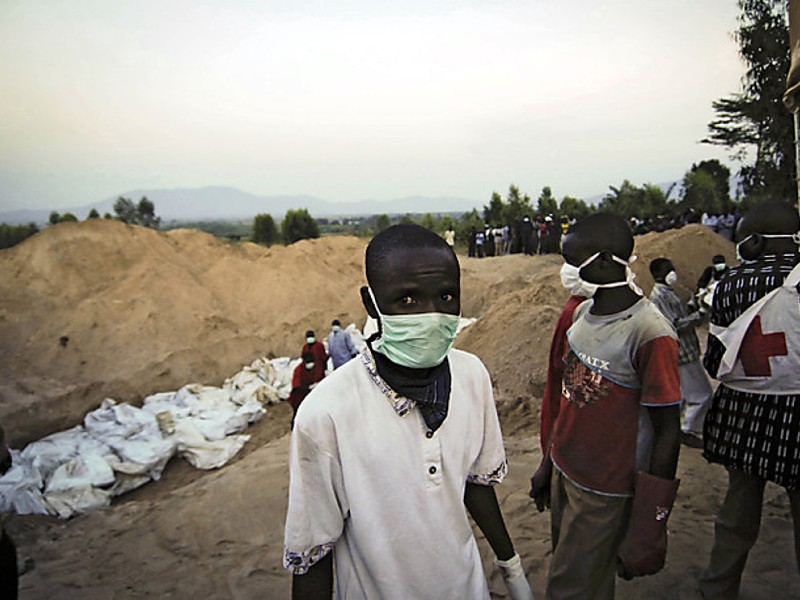
Mass burial of victims of the "Catastrophe de Sange"

A tank truck exploded on 2 July 2010 in South Kivu, Democratic Republic of the Congo. The truck overturned in the village of Sange, near the Congo–Burundi border, and later exploded, resulting in at least 230 deaths and 196 injured. Mende Omalanga, the Democratic Republic of Congo's Minister of Communications, claimed that the tank truck was trying to overtake a bus. A local police officer reported that the driver was traveling at an "excessive speed".

An explosion occurred as villagers attempted to collect the fuel that was spilling from the overturned vehicle. "There was a crush (of people) and a petrol leak." The minister of communications, Lambert Omalanga, said that one local resident was smoking a cigarette, a spark from which ignited the fuel. Many mud and grass huts were destroyed in the subsequent fire.

Among the dead were 36 women and 61 children. Some of the injured had severe burn wounds. A medical source said that the local hospitals "do not have necessary logistical materials to treat those who are seriously injured". It was initially reported that five of the dead were United Nations peacekeepers, but this was reported later as being incorrect.

=== Alakija, Nigeria (2010) ===
A tank truck explosion occurred in the Alakija area of Mile 2, a commercial district along the Badagry Expressway, Lagos State, Nigeria. The incident was reported to have occurred on 1 December 2010 when a tank truck loaded with gasoline lost control. The content of the tank truck spewed on the road leading to an explosion that claimed the lives of about 20 people and leaving several others severely injured. Four vehicles, including two commuter buses filled with more than 24 commuters and two private cars, were burnt. Taiwo Abayomi, the Area Commander of the Lagos State Traffic Management Authority confirmed the incident.

=== Okobie, Nigeria (2012) ===
On 12 July 2012, a tank truck in Okobie, Nigeria, fell into a ditch, spilled its gasoline contents, and subsequently exploded, killing at least 121. The tank truck attempted to avoid a collision with two cars and a bus, veered into a ditch, and spilled fuel. Hundreds of locals rushed to the scene to take some of the spilled gasoline.

About 40 minutes after the accident, the tank truck exploded. The death toll was initially placed at 95, including 93 people who perished instantly and two who died after being brought to hospital. The death toll was later revised to 121 after more bodies were recovered from neighboring villages where they had been taken by their relatives. The number of injured was at least 75, although the actual number was likely higher as some were treated by relatives or at private clinics. Some 34 motorcycle taxis were destroyed. The drivers of the motorcycles, known as Okada in Nigeria, came to scoop up spilled fuel for their vehicles after learning of the accident and became victims of the explosion. In separate statements, the Nigerian National Emergency Management Agency (NEMA) and the Federal Road Safety Commission of Rivers State gave the same figures for the incident.

=== Shaanxi, China (2012) ===
On 26 August 2012, a double-decker sleeper bus crashed into a tank truck in northern China, near the city of Yan'an, Shaanxi Province. The tank truck was loaded with highly flammable methanol. Thirty-six people were killed. The accident was the deadliest in China since the 2011 Xinyang bus fire, when a fire in an overcrowded sleeper bus containing flammable material killed 41 people.

The tank truck was returning to the highway following an early-morning rest stop. Meanwhile, the double-decker sleeper bus carrying 39 people left Hohhot, in Inner Mongolia, and headed south to Xi'an. The tank truck was rear-ended by the bus at approximately 2:00 am on the Baotou-Maoming motorway in north China. The tank truck was loaded with methanol. Thirty-six people were killed in the crash, partly due to the fact that many of the passengers were sleeping at the time of the explosion. Three people survived the crash but were hospitalized with injuries. On 5 September 2012, the public security bureau of Ansai District announced that it had confirmed the identities of 35 of those killed, with one male victim being unidentified.

Following pictures of safety official Yang Dacai depicting him grinning at the scene of the crash, Chinese officials have launched an investigation into Yang, although Yang said he was simply trying to cheer people. Web users have been outraged at the pictures, and some web users discovered pictures of Yang wearing wrist watches which cost over $40,000, and demanded an investigation into Yang's behavior. However, Yang has said that he "used legal income" to buy these watches. Nonetheless, he was later stripped of all his official duties for "serious wrongdoing" amid reports that officials were also investigating other trails of "wrongdoing." He was later jailed for 14 years on charges of bribery and possessing a large amount of funds on unclear grounds.

=== Chala, India (2012) ===
On 27 August 2012, an accident occurred on Indian National Highway 17 (now NH 66) at Chala, Kannur District, Kerala, India, when an Indian Oil Corporation Limited (IOCL) LPG tank truck hit a road lane divider, overturned and exploded in a BLEVE, which resulted in several building fires between 9:30 pm and 11 pm. The accident killed 20 people.

=== Riyadh, Saudi Arabia (2012) ===
On 1 November 2012, a truck carrying fuel crashed into an intersection flyover in the east of Riyadh, the capital city of Saudi Arabia. The lorry hit a bridge pylon on Khureis Road and the gasoline it was carrying leaked into the surroundings and then ignited. Al Ekhbariya television reported that the blast killed 23 people outright and injured 111, with the death toll expected to rise even higher; although the Saudi health ministry reported the injury total was closer to 135. An Agence France-Presse photographer on the scene described widespread damage, with charred bodies and machinery being hauled from the wreckage. Due to the force of the blast, another truck fell off of the flyover. Amateur video showed black smoke billowing into the sky, visible throughout the city.

The scene of the crash was within close vicinity of Prince Nayef Arab University for Security Studies, as well as the headquarters of the Saudi Arabian National Guard, thus instigating the speculation of terrorist collusion or perpetration. However, a police spokesman stated that this was inexorably not the case, explaining "the truck driver was surprised by a road accident on its route, causing it to crash into one of the pillars of the bridge". The police also posited that due to it being the Eid al-Adha holiday, the casualty total was significantly less than it would have been during a normal day, because of vastly reduced traffic. The Riyadh Police also warned against congregating near the scene of the crash, as roughly 10,000 people took to doing so just an hour after the accident occurred.

On 2 November, the Saudi health ministry stated that the death toll was confirmed to have risen to 26 through the night, including Saudis, Filipinos (the lorry driver's nationality), and victims of other nationalities. The crash is expected to cost more than 300 million riyals. According to Saudi Minister of Health Abdullah bin Abdulaziz Al Rabiah, 90 of the injured have been released from the hospital, but 43 are still under intensive medical care. The driver was arrested, but the charges against him are unknown.

=== Ecatepec de Morelos, Mexico (2013) ===
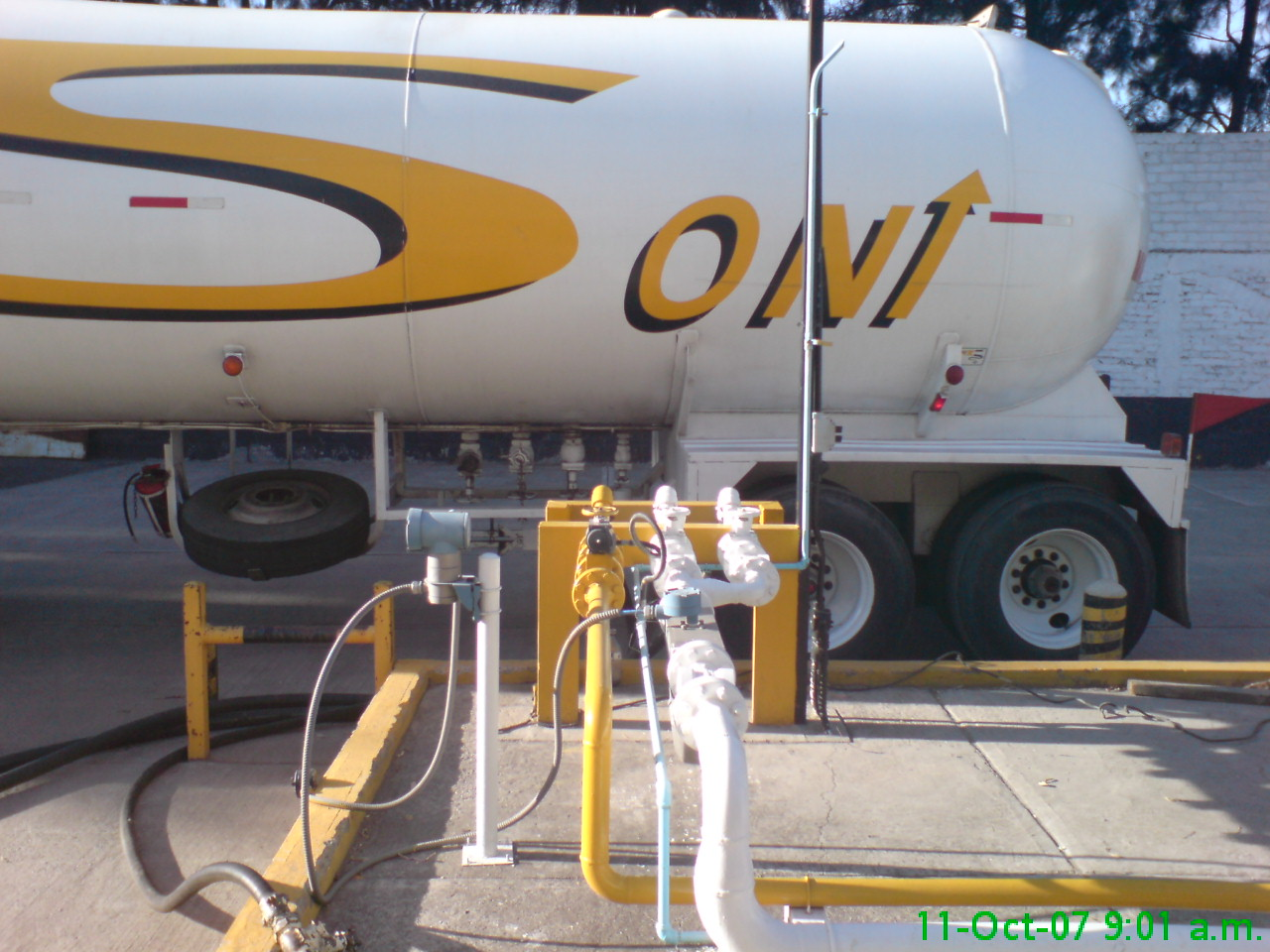
The Ecatepec de Morelos explosion was caused by a gas tank truck similar to this one, owned by Mexican company Sonigas.

On 7 May 2013, at about 5:15 am local time (12:15 GMT), a gas tank truck exploded in a BLEVE on Federal Highway 85 "México–Pachuca" in Ecatepec de Morelos, a municipality in the State of Mexico about 8.7 mi (14.0 km) north-east of Mexico City. As a result of the accident, 22 people were killed, including 10 children, and another 31 people were injured. Among the dead was a family of four, including two children aged 11 and 6. Twenty-three people were hospitalized, eight of them in serious condition. Many of the casualties were asleep in their homes along the edge of the road at the time of the accident.

The blast led to extensive fires which damaged 45 homes and 16 vehicles. Local media reports described the area as resembling a "war zone". "It was a ball of fire which exploded as though they'd put a spotlight in the whole window," said an eyewitness. "We opened the door and it was like fire had blown through the whole of the garden." Roughly 100 people were left homeless by the accident. Several animals were killed by the explosion, but some others were rescued. Although Pemex was not involved in the crash, the company said it would help with rescue efforts.

According to early reports, the driver of the tank truck, Omar Díaz Olivares, allegedly was speeding and lost control of his vehicle. He then crashed into several cars and homes before the tank truck exploded. Díaz was taken to the local hospital, where he was arrested. The highway remained closed for five hours, but later a few highway lanes were opened. According to Díaz's declaration, he lost control of the tank truck after he tried to evade a minivan.

President of Mexico Enrique Peña Nieto requested the Secretariat of Communications and Transportation, as well as Mexico Civil Protection System, to investigate the causes of the accident. Eruviel Ávila, governor of the State of Mexico, returned to Mexico. Ávila was on an official visit to Vatican City, but after the explosions he decided to cancel his trip. He announced state government-paid funeral expenses of the families of the victims, and affected people will receive MXN$50,000 (about US$5,000) to "rebuild their homes", and MXN$25,000 (about US$2,000) to buy home appliances. The company Termogas, owner of the truck, announced they will be responsible for damages, if their truck was the cause of the accident. Alfredo Martínez Torres, secretary of Urban Development of the State of Mexico, announced at least 110 families that live near the highway will be relocated.

=== Bintaro, Indonesia (2013) ===
In the morning of 9 December 2013 a KRL Commuterline train crashed into a Pertamina tank truck at a railroad crossing in Bintaro, Jakarta, Indonesia. At least one female-only car overturned and burst into flames. At least seven people were killed (including the three train drivers) and another 82 were wounded.

=== Kafr Az-Zayyat, Egypt (2013) ===
On 10 December 2013 a tank truck carrying gasoline crashed into a minibus in Kafr Az-Zayyat, an Egyptian city south of Alexandria. The crash and the ensuing explosion killed at least 13 people. The accident was caused by the burst of one of the truck's tyres.

=== Kirikiri, Nigeria (2014) ===
This incident was reported to have occurred on 7 January 2014 at Kirikiri, Apapa, a port area in Lagos State, Nigeria, when a tank truck loaded with about 8,718 U.S. gallons (33.00 m^{3}) of gasoline rammed into parked vehicles. The spilling of the gasoline resulted in an explosion that killed about 15 people, leaving several others seriously injured. Sterling bank was affected, one Automated Teller Machine, 11 cars and 60 shops were burnt as well. The spokesperson to the National Emergency Management Agency of the South-West Zone, Ibrahim Farinloye confirm the incident.

=== Juba, South Sudan (2015) ===
The Juba tank truck explosion was a tank truck explosion that occurred on 17 September 2015 in a suburb of Juba, the capital of South Sudan. It killed an estimated 176 people, most casualties coming from the crowd that had converged on the scene of the leaking tank truck. The Red Cross dispatched aid to the suburb of Maridi after the incident. The death toll increased to 183 people being dead from the incident. It soon increased to 193 people.

=== Caphiridzange, Mozambique (2016) ===
On 17 November 2016, eighty people were killed and more than a hundred people injured in a fuel tank truck explosion in the town of Caphiridzange, Tete Province, Mozambique. The fuel tank truck was en route to Malawi at the time and carried 7,925 U.S. gallons (30.00 m^{3}) of gasoline. The government subsequently declared three days of national mourning on 19 November to pay tribute to the victims.

=== Bahawalpur, Pakistan (2017) ===
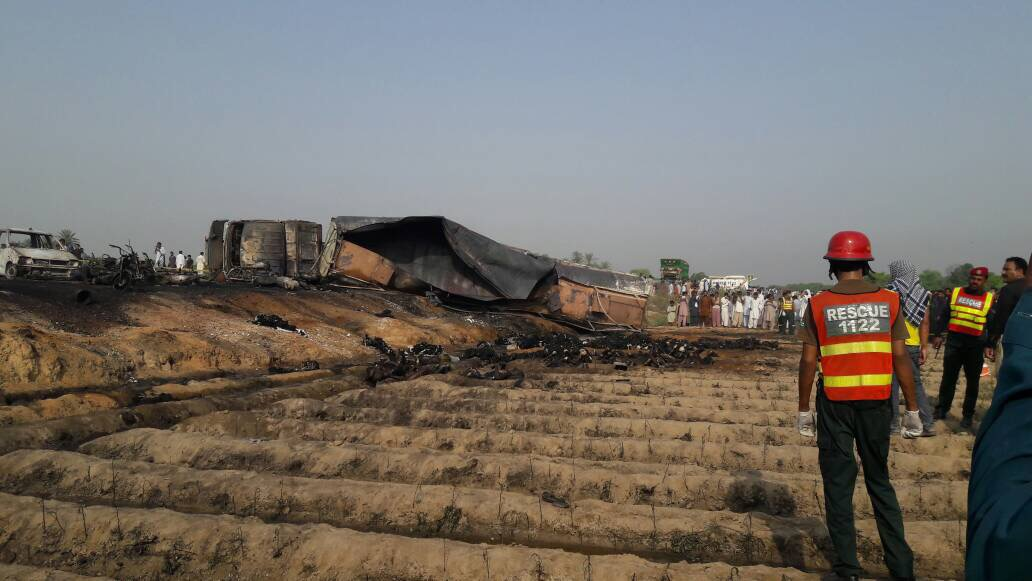
The site of the Bahawalpur explosion

On 25 June 2017, a tank truck exploded near Ahmedpur East in Pakistan's Bahawalpur District, killing 219 people and injuring at least 34 others. The truck overturned when its driver attempted to make a sharp turn on the N-5 National Highway. Once the news of the accident spread to nearby villages, hundreds of residents rushed to the scene to loot the truck of its cargo. The truck then exploded; early reports suggested the explosion was caused by someone lighting a cigarette.

Around 6:00 am local time, a tank truck carrying 13,209 U.S. gallons (50.00 m^{3}) of fuel overturned due to the driver sleeping on N-5 National Highway near Ahmedpur East, Bahawalpur District, in Punjab, Pakistan. The truck was travelling from Karachi to Vehari. News of the accident quickly spread to the nearby village of Ramzanpur Joya, with villagers being alerted via the loudspeaker on top of a local mosque. A large number of people busy working in mango farms beside the road (one source estimated about 500), including men, women, and children, subsequently gathered at the site to collect leaking gasoline. The crowd ignored attempts by police to clear the area. About 10 minutes later, the truck exploded after leaked fuel from its damaged container caught fire, killing at least 148 people. Dozens of those injured died in the following days, bringing the death toll to 219 with 34 others still being treated in hospitals as of 11 July 2017. According to some media reports, the explosion occurred about 45 minutes after the initial truck crash. There were conflicting preliminary reports about the cause of the explosion: some said the fuel was ignited by an attempt to light a cigarette near the overturned tank truck, and others blamed a spark from one of the numerous cars and motorcycles that rushed to the scene.

National Highways & Motorway Police suspended traffic and set up two diversions, near Noorpur Nauranga and further ahead of Dera Nawaz. The Rescue 1122 and fire brigade arrived on the site of the incident immediately after the blaze started, and rescue operations were initiated. Firefighters fought the blaze for over two hours before extinguishing the fire. At least 90 of the victims were taken to District Headquarters Hospital and Bahawal Victoria Hospital in Bahawalpur. Pakistan Army helicopters were used to transfer 51 injured people from Bahawalpur to Nishtar Hospital in Multan.

Most bodies were burned beyond recognition, many down to their skeletons. At least six cars and 12 motorcycles were burned in the explosion. The highway was littered with kitchen utensils, pots, water coolers, jerrycans and buckets which victims had brought to collect the gasoline. The driver of the fuel tank truck was kept under arrest for investigation, but he was one of those in critical condition and later died at a hospital. Over 120 victims, who were beyond recognition, were buried in a mass grave.

=== Lagos, Nigeria (2018) ===
On 28 June 2018 a tank truck fully loaded with petroleum product fell from the Otedola Bridge at the Lagos, Nigeria end of the Lagos-Ibadan Expressway. The subsequent leak caused a massive fire. The fire extended to other vehicles approaching the lorry on the busy road. Twelve people perished.

=== Borgo Panigale, Italy (2018) ===
On 6 August 2018, the collision of a liquefied petroleum gas tank truck with an articulated lorry carrying flammable solvents and a car transporter resulted in a huge explosion on the A14 motorway within Borgo Panigale, a neighborhood of Bologna, Italy. It was a case of boiling-liquid expanding-vapor explosion (BLEVE), where nearly all the tank truck cargo combusted in a matter of seconds upon release, generating a tremendous amount of thermal radiation. The accident killed two people, injured 145 and caused significant damage to the surrounding commercial and residential area. One span of the viaduct where it happened collapsed and a gash opened in the motorway.

=== Mbuba, Democratic Republic of the Congo (2018) ===
On 6 October 2018, in Kongo Central, Democratic Republic of the Congo, a tank truck collided with another truck in the village of Mbuba and later exploded, killing at least 50 people and injuring more than 100 others. Following the crash, villagers of Mbuba started to collect fuel which leaked from the vehicles. After few minutes, fuel began to burn and destroy nearby houses. The United Nations mission in DRC, MONUSCO, had sent nine ambulances to the Kisantu, which is where the most of injured were evacuated to shortly after accident.

=== Bình Phước, Việt Nam (2018) ===
On 22 November 2018, a fuel tanker crashed into a three-wheeled vehicle on National Route 13 in Chơn Thành District, Bình Phước Province, Vietnam. The tanker overturned and leaked fuel, which ignited and caused a massive fire that destroyed multiple houses along the road.

The incident killed 6 people and injured several others, while at least 19 houses were burned down.

=== Hub, Pakistan (2019) ===
On 21 January 2019, a passenger bus collided with a tank truck in Hub, Balochistan, Pakistan. At least 26 people were killed and 16 others suffered burn injuries as a result of the accident. The bus was travelling from Karachi to Panjgur with more than 40 people on board. The dead bodies were moved to Edhi Foundation's morgue in Sohrab Goth, Karachi. A joint investigation team was established to investigate the crash.

=== Morogoro, Tanzania (2019) ===
On 10 August 2019, a fuel tank truck exploded in Morogoro, Tanzania, killing over 100 people and injuring at least 47 others. It was one of the largest disasters of its kind in Tanzania. The incident happened in the town of Morogoro, which is located 115 miles (185 km) west of Dar es Salaam. A fuel tank truck crashed and people gathered at the accident site to collect the fuel. The tank truck exploded, initially burning 60 people to death. Video footage of the incident began circulating on social media, in which many people can be seen collecting fuel in yellow containers and jerrycans. Another 55 people were injured in the incident and many suffered serious burns.

The explosion occurred at 8:30 am EAT, 20 minutes after a fuel tank truck overturned while trying to avoid colliding with a motorcyclist. The crash happened near Msamvu Bus Terminal. The road on which the crash occurred connects Morogoro to the financial capital Dar es Salaam and is heavily used. Witnesses say that a crowd of at least 150 people gathered at the scene. The crowd began collecting the fuel using yellow jerrycans and continued even when the tank truck burst into flames. A video was posted by local news channel Kwanza TV on Twitter, showing groups of people attempting to gather fuel around the tank truck.

One of the witnesses described the scene as chaotic with a huge fire which made it "challenging to rescue victims. The situation is really bad. Many people died here – even those who were not stealing fuel – because this is a busy place". At 3:00 pm EAT, rescue operations finished and all the bodies were removed from the scene. The regional police commissioner, Wilbard Mutafungwa, stated that many people suffered burns as a result of the explosion.

Official police figures reported 75 deaths and at least 55 people injured. Most of the victims were identified as local motorcycle taxi drivers who were present at the scene and people who attempted to gather fuel. Morogoro regional commissioner Stephen Kebwe said it was the worst disaster in the region, and warned of more possible deaths. Afterwards, government spokesperson Hassan Abbas said, "the rescue operations finished by 3 pm local time. The scene was cordoned off and all bodies were removed from the scene into a local hospital for identification."

== 2020s ==
=== Pueblo Viejo, Colombia (2020) ===
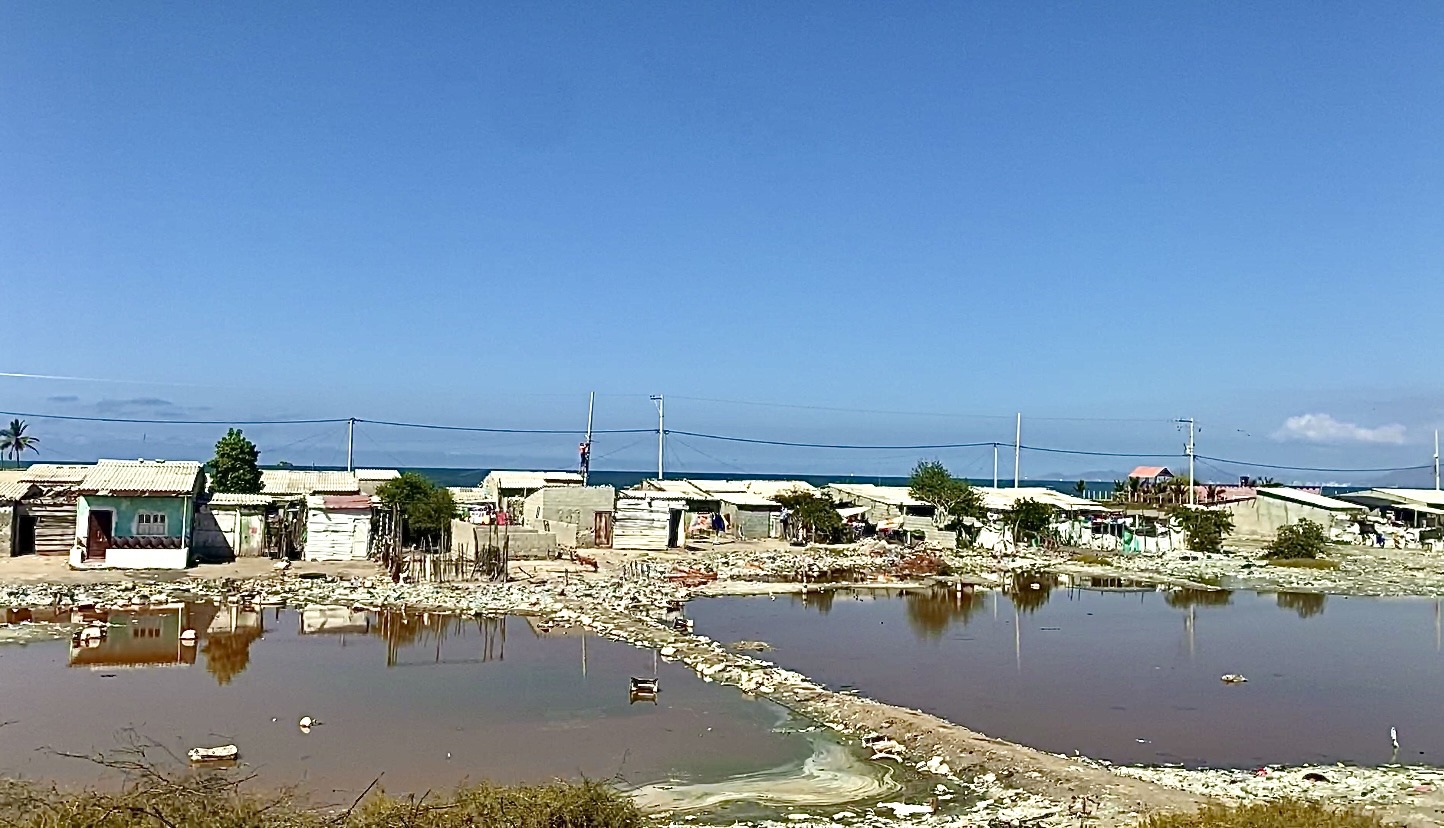
The village of Tasajera in 2022

The Tasajera explosion took place in the village of Tasajera, municipality of Pueblo Viejo, Colombia, on Monday, 6 July 2020. A tank truck that was transporting gasoline to Barranquilla along a Caribbean road overturned in Tasajera. According to the Magdalena police report, the driver swerved, lost control, and went off the road; the driver was uninjured. Some of the villagers took advantage of the situation to collect the fuel. When they tried to steal the vehicle's battery by extracting it, the gasoline exploded, leaving 45 people dead and at least 19 injured.

On 6 July 2020, a tank truck driven by trucker Manuel Cataño Hernández was transporting gasoline to Barranquilla along the Caribbean highway. Around 0830, shortly after passing through the toll of that corregimiento, the truck overturned on the highway, ending up in an accident on the left side of the road with the driver inside, at kilometer 47 of the Tasajera corregimiento. According to the driver of the truck who survived the accident, he was able to get out of the truck by his own means and the overturning occurred due to avoiding a crocodile that was crossing, making a sudden maneuver and losing control of the truck.

Upon hearing the news of the accident, several residents of nearby towns, most of them from Tasajera, gathered at the scene of the accident with several gallons and empty buckets to steal gasoline to later be sold. The police who were at the scene were unable to stop them due to the large number of people. While several people were getting gasoline out of the truck and checking the driver's cabin, as seen in a video taken by a witness at the scene, the truck's tank suddenly exploded, engulfing all the nearby people who were crowded around it with its flames. This instantly killed seven of them whose bodies were charred and wounded more than fifty other people, most of whom died over the next two weeks until 22 July, when the last death would was recorded. All the registered victims were male and most were under 30 years of age, with some even being minors. Also, several of the victims were relatives to each other, so several families lost several members due to the incident.

In an amateur video recorded by a cell phone, the exact moment of the explosion was captured, but a potential ignition source was not visible. According to witnesses, the conflagration was generated when two of the people close to the car tried to detach the battery from it. Another reason could be the static electricity generated by the human body at a level sufficient to generate a spark triggered the explosion. Of these two hypotheses, the first was the most accepted by the authorities.

The health authorities of Magdalena released the list of those killed. The bodies of seven of them were burned and had to be identified by DNA samples taken from their relatives. The other victims died in different hospitals to which they were transferred. The Texas Shriners Hospital in the United States, donated 5,425 square inches (35,000 cm^{2}) of skin grafts to start treatment for patients who were burned in the fire. On 6 August 2020, a month after the tragedy, hundreds of relatives and friends of the victims organized a tribute and inaugurated a mural at the place where the explosion occurred with photos and names of the deceased to remember them.

=== Tleil, Lebanon (2021) ===
At least 28 people were killed and 79 people injured after a fuel tank truck explosion in Tleil, Akkar District, Lebanon, on 15 August 2021. The disaster was reportedly exacerbated by the ongoing Lebanese liquidity crisis; in which the Lebanese pound has plummeted and fuel has been in short supply. The survivors were evacuated by the Lebanese Red Cross. In response the Lebanese Army opened an investigation into the incident. The fuel tank truck had been confiscated by the Lebanese Armed Forces from black marketeers, the fuel was then distributed/taken by the locals. The son of the man whose land the fuel tank truck was located on, was later arrested, accused of deliberately causing the explosion.

=== Freetown, Sierra Leone (2021) ===
At approximately 10:00 pm on 5 November 2021, a fuel tank truck carrying gasoline attempted to make a turn outside the Choithram Supermarket in Wellington, a suburb of Freetown, Sierra Leone. A truck reported to be carrying granite collided with the tank truck at the junction creating a fuel leakage. The two drivers came out of their vehicles and warned community residents to stay off the scene, according to Sierra Leone's National Disaster Management Agency. Gasoline spilled from the tank truck and locals, particularly okada riders, attempted to collect it in containers. An explosion led to a huge fireball that engulfed vehicles, people and passengers that were stuck in traffic created by the initial collision. The mayor of Freetown, Yvonne Aki-Sawyerr, said that the damage was exacerbated by people who gathered at the lorry, scooped the leaking fuel in containers and placed them in close proximity to the crash scene. This created traffic chaos with many people, including passengers in cars and buses, stuck very close to the scene of the accident.

Many of the victims were trapped in vehicles, including a bus full of people which was intensely burnt, killing all inside. Nearby shops and markets caught fire after fuel spilled onto the streets. Footage broadcast by local media outlets showed charred bodies surrounding the tank truck. At least 99 people were initially confirmed to have been killed in the disaster, and more than 100 others were injured. The death toll rose to 131 five days after the explosion and reached 151 by 6 December.

The Directorate of the National Disaster Management Agency (NDMA), issued a statement confirming that the injured had been transferred to hospitals and the bodies had been collected. They added that rescue efforts at the scene had ended by 16:45 GMT on 6 November. Several people are in critical condition. According to a staff member at Connaught Hospital's intensive care unit, about 30 severely burned victims taken to the unit were not expected to survive. Sierra Leone's president Julius Maada Bio, who was attending the United Nations climate talks in Glasgow, Scotland, offered condolences and promised support to the victims' families. The country's vice president Mohamed Juldeh Jalloh visited two of the hospitals where some of the victims were taken to for treatment, but it was later reported that the hospital services had been completely overwhelmed. On 8 November those who died during the explosion were buried in a mass ceremony in Waterloo, on the outskirts of Freetown. President Bio declared a three-day national mourning and ordered all flags to be flown at half-mast, and indicated that a task force will be set up to look into what happened, and will provide recommendations that will help to avoid similar tragedies in the future.

=== Cap-Haïtien, Haiti (2021) ===
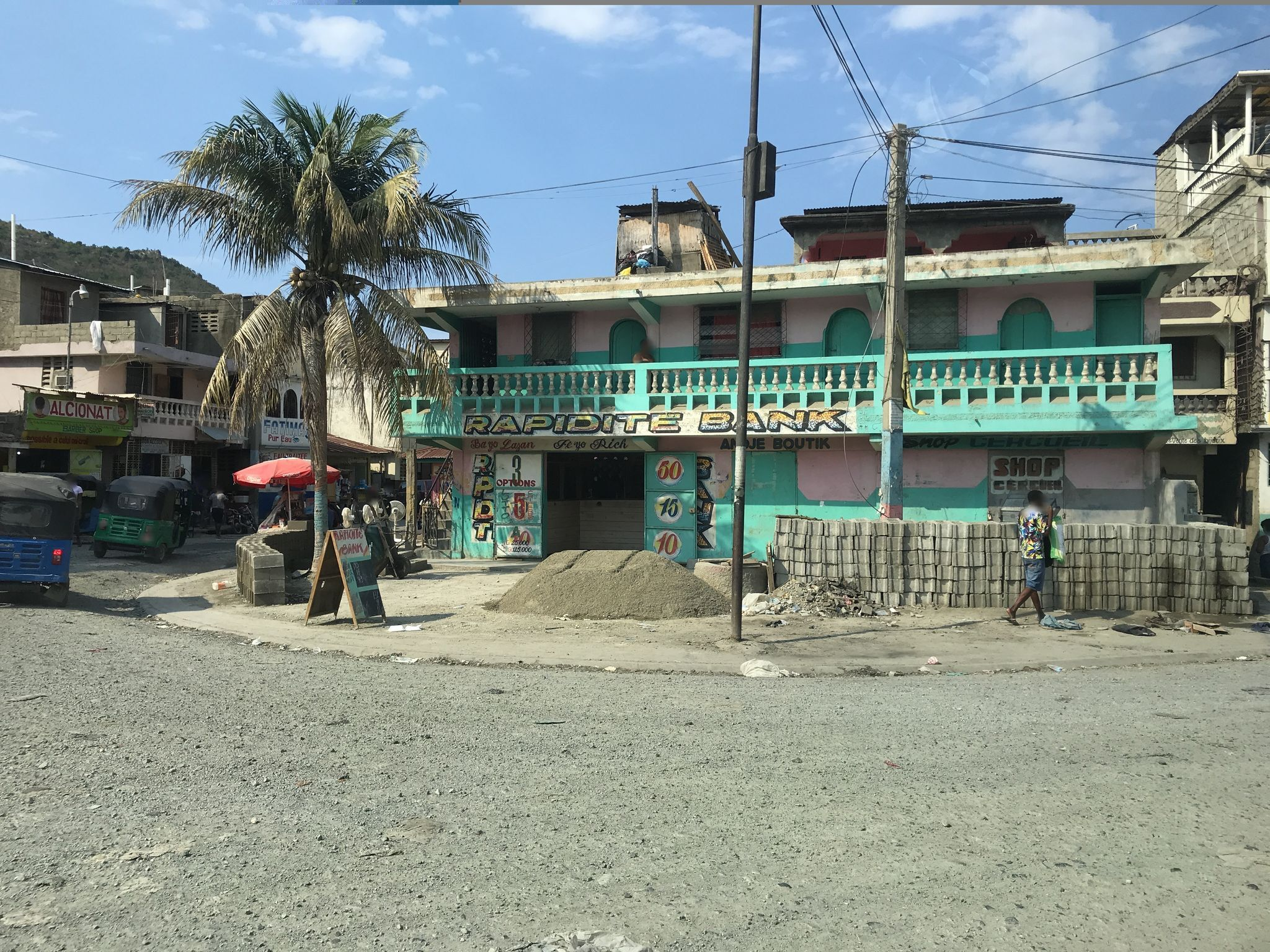
Location where the Cap-Haïtien explosion occurred, pictured in 2019.

On 14 December 2021, a fuel tank truck exploded in the Samari neighborhood of Cap-Haïtien, the capital city of the Haitian department of Nord. At least 90 people were killed and more than 120 were injured; many people were injured as a result of rushing towards the tank truck, likely to collect some of its cargo, before the explosion occurred. Many inhabitants are suffering from a huge financial crisis. Haiti, hit with an economic crisis worsened by an earthquake four months earlier, was unable to adequately treat victims of the explosion, with hospitals undersupplied and in disarray.

A fuel tank truck carrying 9,000 US gallons (34 m^{3}) of gasoline, in an attempt to avoid a motorbike, overturned and began spilling fuel. The driver of the truck exited the vehicle and warned bystanders not to approach. However some of the victims of the explosion had rushed forward after the initial crash. The tank truck then exploded, with fuel stored in nearby houses worsening the extent of the explosion. The blast also set 50 homes on fire, damaged businesses, and charred vehicles. The cause of the explosion was trash that was smoldering when gasoline from the truck reached it. Firefighters were dispatched to the area, but due to water shortages had to call in aid from airport fire services.

Ninety people were killed in the explosion and more than 100 people were injured. After the explosion, several victims were injured due to trampling. Ambulances took up to five hours to arrive, and 15 victims had to be airlifted. Victims were sent to smaller, less equipped hospitals because the largest hospital in the city had shut down in November, due to being attacked by bandits. These hospitals were overwhelmed and were unable to handle the victims, as they lacked basic supplies, with some victims being placed on the floor or the yard of the hospital due to the lack of hospital beds. Fourteen victims died while in the hospital. Field hospitals were also set up in the city. UNICEF sent medical equipment to the city for burn victims. Acting President and Prime Minister Ariel Henry announced three days of mourning in the country.

=== Anjangaon, India (2022) ===
On 26 October 2022 at around 05:00, a fuel tank truck originating from BPCL Indore carrying 2,100 U.S. gallons (7.9 m^{3}) of gasoline and 1,100 U.S. gallons (4.2 m^{3}) of diesel oil in separate compartments overturned near Anjangaon, a village on Khargone District, Madhya Pradesh, India, later exploding. One woman died instantly at the scene, with a further 14 of the 23 injured succumbing to their injuries over the following nine days.

=== Boksburg, South Africa (2022) ===
On 24 December 2022, a fuel tank truck carrying liquefied petroleum gas exploded in Boksburg, Gauteng, South Africa. Forty-one people were killed. Tambo Memorial Hospital was adjacent to the explosion, causing a significant casualty rate among the staff and patients. The truck driver was arrested, but the charges were dropped.

=== Ulaanbaatar, Mongolia (2024) ===
On 24 January 2024, a truck with 60 tons of liquefied natural gas crashed in the Mongolian capital, Ulaanbaatar. Three firefighters were killed in the explosion along with 10 injured. A preliminary assessment suggested the truck crashed into a small car, sparking the explosion before a second blast ripped off part of the truck and killed the firefighters at the scene.

=== Niger State, Nigeria (2024) ===
On 9 September 2024, a fuel tank truck that was also carrying cattle had a head-on collision with another truck in Niger State, Nigeria, causing an explosion that killed at least 52 people. Most of the victims were burned alive.

=== Majiya, Nigeria (2024) ===
On 15 October 2024, a fuel tank truck overturned and spilt gasoline near Majiya, in the Taura local government area, Jigawa State, Nigeria. Villagers tried to scoop up the fuel when there was an explosion and fire, which killed at least 170 people.

=== Suleja, Nigeria (2025) ===
On 18 January 2025, a gasoline tank truck crashed near Dikko junction, Suleja, Niger State, Nigeria. The resulting explosion killed at least 98 people and injured about 70. The victims were people attempting to collect fuel from the wreck.

=== Nushki District, Pakistan (2025) ===
On 28 April 2025, a fuel tanker exploded in Nushki District, Balochistan, Pakistan, killing 3 people and injuring at least 73. The blast occurred as firefighters responded to a fire caused by a fuel leak.

=== Iztapalapa, Mexico City (2025) ===
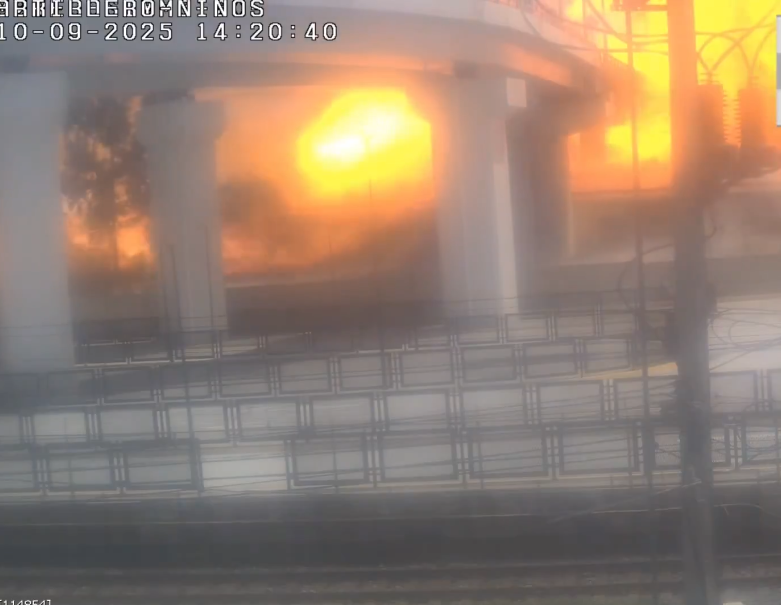
Exact moment captured by a CCTV

On 10 September 2025, at around 14:20 (GMT-6), a liquefied petroleum gas (LPG) deflagration occurred in Iztapalapa, Mexico City, following a gas leak from an overturned tanker truck belonging to Gas Silza, a subsidiary of Grupo Tomza. The tanker was carrying 49,500 liters of LPG. It killed 29 people and injured 90 others.

=== Essa, Nigeria (2025) ===
On 21 October 2025, an oil tanker crashed in central Niger State, and began to leak fuel. Villagers rushed to collect the spilling fuel, when the tanker exploded, killing at least 42 people and injuring another 52. Niger State Governor Mohammed Umar Bago described the incident as "worrisome, unfortunate and pathetic", referring to the fact that there are awareness campaigns urging people not to go near crashed tankers.

=== Renca, Santiago, Chile (2026) ===
On 19 February 2026, in the northern Santiago commune of Renca, Chile, at around 8:06 (GMT -3), a tanker truck loaded with liquefied petroleum gas (LPG) belonging to Gasco company overturned after hitting a guardrail at the intersection of Route 5 North with General Velásquez. That led to a massive gas leak, followed by a violent explosion and fire. 13 people died and 8 others were injured.

The truck was reportedly traveling at excessive speed, which caused a breach in the tank that led to a gas leak.
