= Sadiq Garh Palace =

19th-century palace in Pakistan

- صادق گڑھ پیلس
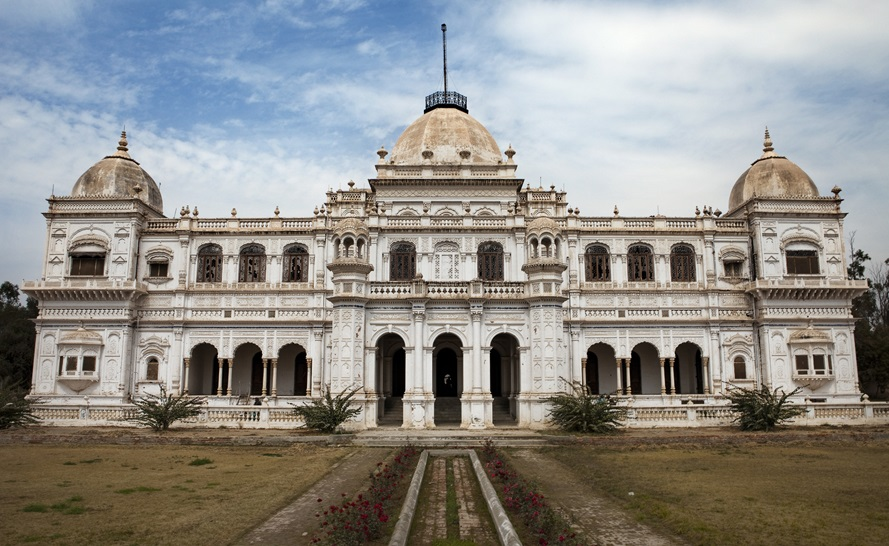
- Interactive map of the Sadiq Garh Palace area

General information
- Type: Royal residence
- Architectural style: Indo‑Islamic and Italianate
- Location: Dera Nawab Sahib, Ahmedpur East Tehsil, Bahawalpur District, Punjab, Pakistan
- Coordinates: 29°6′20″N 71°16′34″E
- Construction started: 1882
- Completed: 1895
- Owner: Heirs of the Nawab of Bahawalpur

Technical details
- Floor count: 3
- Grounds: 125 acres (51 ha)

Design and construction
- Architects: Italian engineers and local craftsmen

Sadiq Garh Palace (Urdu: صادق گڑھ پیلس) is a 19th‑century princely complex in Dera Nawab Sahib, southern Punjab, Pakistan. It served as the winter seat of the Abbasi rulers of the former Bahawalpur State. Covering roughly 125 acres behind ramparts 50 feet high, it was once among the largest private estates in South Asia.

== History ==
Sadiq Garh Palace was commissioned by Sadiq Muhammad Khan IV in 1882 and was finished in 1895, after a decade of construction supervised by Italian engineers. According to some reports, some 15,000 labourers worked for ten years and Rs 1.5 million were spent to complete the palace and its outbuildings.

During the princely era, the estate expanded to include three subsidiary mahals, Mubarak, Rahat and Sadiq, linked by tunnels as well as a private powerhouse, cinema, and armoury. The darbar hall displayed retired Ghilaf‑e‑Kaaba covers produced in Bahawalpur and hosted audiences for British viceroys and other dignitaries.

In the mid‑1970s, the government of Zulfikar Ali Bhutto sealed the property amid a dispute with one branch of the Abbasi family, and decades of litigation concluded only in 2005 when the Supreme Court of Pakistan divided the estate among twenty‑three heirs.

== Architecture ==
Sadiq Garh Palace on the Stamp of Bahawalpur State

The main block presents a symmetrical white façade surmounted by a central ribbed dome flanked by four smaller cupolas. Inside are about 120 large rooms, each pair decorated to evoke the decorative arts of a different country for the Nawab's foreign guests. Teak staircases, two early hydraulic elevators and vaulted basements link the three floors to underground passages reputed to reach other royal compounds.

== Condition and conservation ==
Long periods of governmental sequestration allowed extensive theft of antiques, furniture and a fleet of Rolls‑Royce automobiles that once made the palace famous. In 2024, sewage from a collapsed municipal drain submerged the main gate.
