= Ibadan petrol tanker explosion =

Road accident

The Ibadan petrol tanker explosion was a major accident on the road from Ibadan to Ifẹ in Nigeria on 5 November 2000. A petrol tanker failed to brake in time, ramming into a long tailback, causing an explosion and fire which destroyed over 100 vehicles and killed many people. Hundreds of people were burnt, straining Oyo State's medical services. This was one of a series of road accidents with a high death toll in Nigeria, which have continued with further tanker explosions in 2018 and 2019.

== Casualties ==
Estimates of casualties in the disaster remain imprecise. The police and other rescue services did not offer any assistance until some time after the blast, and so numerous bodies were removed by relatives or volunteer rescuers and privately buried, whilst others were cremated in the fire. Most sources simply give a vague "over 100 dead" despite the official count of 96 recovered bodies, and offer statements that "the final death toll could be much higher". What is certain is that local hospitals were totally swamped with hundreds of badly injured burn victims, creating a major crisis in the country's health service, which simply could not cope with so many badly injured patients in this area.

The Nigerian police reported that they had recovered 115 destroyed vehicles from the roadway in the aftermath of the accident, implying a substantially higher death toll than initially quoted. Later sources however are restricted to using high round figures rather than accurate data, with Namibian sources reporting 150 killed, whilst Indian newspapers suggesting 200 died. It is unlikely that the death toll will ever be known with certainty due to incompetency on the part of local authorities. Their failure to conduct a serious investigation prompted outrage among the public.

== Controversy ==
The crash was surrounded by major controversy because in the previous four months, over 150 people had been killed in high profile crashes involving petrol tankers and buses. These crashes had led to such incidents as the Abuja bus crash riots, in which four more people had been killed, as well as growing resentment of the police and civil authorities who failed to take any responsibility for the country's appalling road safety record.

The reason for the police absence was complicated. The unit with jurisdiction in the area was the Osun State Police, who had been the subjects of numerous corruption complaints. According to local sources, the reason that so many cars were lined up on the motorway before the crash was that the State Police were exacting a toll from motorists from an impromptu roadblock they had set up. Locals said this protection racket led to the disaster because it caused a jam at an unusual place, causing the tanker driver to brake suddenly, leading to a failure of brakes, and the vehicle crash.

The State Police denied the charges, instead insisting that the jam was due to roadworks, and that there was not one single police officer in the district at the time of the crash. The police claimed that when one of their vehicles arrived at the still blazing accident site shortly after the crash, it was attacked by a furious mob, set alight and destroyed, the four occupants escaping only after receiving a beating.

== See also ==
- List of explosions
- List of traffic collisions (2000–present)
