= Msamvu Bus Terminal, Morogoro =

Bus station in Morogoro municipality, Tanzania

Coordinates: 06°48′15″S 37°39′52″E

Msamvu Bus Terminal is located in Morogoro municipality in Tanzania. It is an International Bus Terminal. The main concern is congestion of buses, especially from 09:00 to 10:30 am when most of the buses arrived from Dar es Salaam on the way to other regions and neighbouring countries. Also, buses from southern highlands and neighboring southern countries which are Malawi and Zambia together with those from Lake zone (Mwanza, Shinyanga, Tabora, Simiyu, Dodoma and Mara) converge at Msamvu Bus Terminal during late hours (4:00pm to 7:30pm) making the station too congested.

On 10 August, 2019, the Morogoro tanker explosion occurred after an oil tanker turned over near this bus terminal, killing 75.

== Distance from Dar es Salaam ==
The distance from Dar es Salaam to Morogoro as the crow flies is 178 km (110 miles). Driving distance between Dar es Salaam and Msamvu, Morogoro is 193.63 km. If one drives a car with an average speed of 80 kilometers/hour, travel time to reach Msamvu Bus terminal will be 2 hours 33 minutes, although real-life driving time normally averages between 3.5 - 4.5 hours.
