= Mifumi =

Village in Uganda

Coordinates: 0°45′N 33°58′E

Tororo District in Uganda.

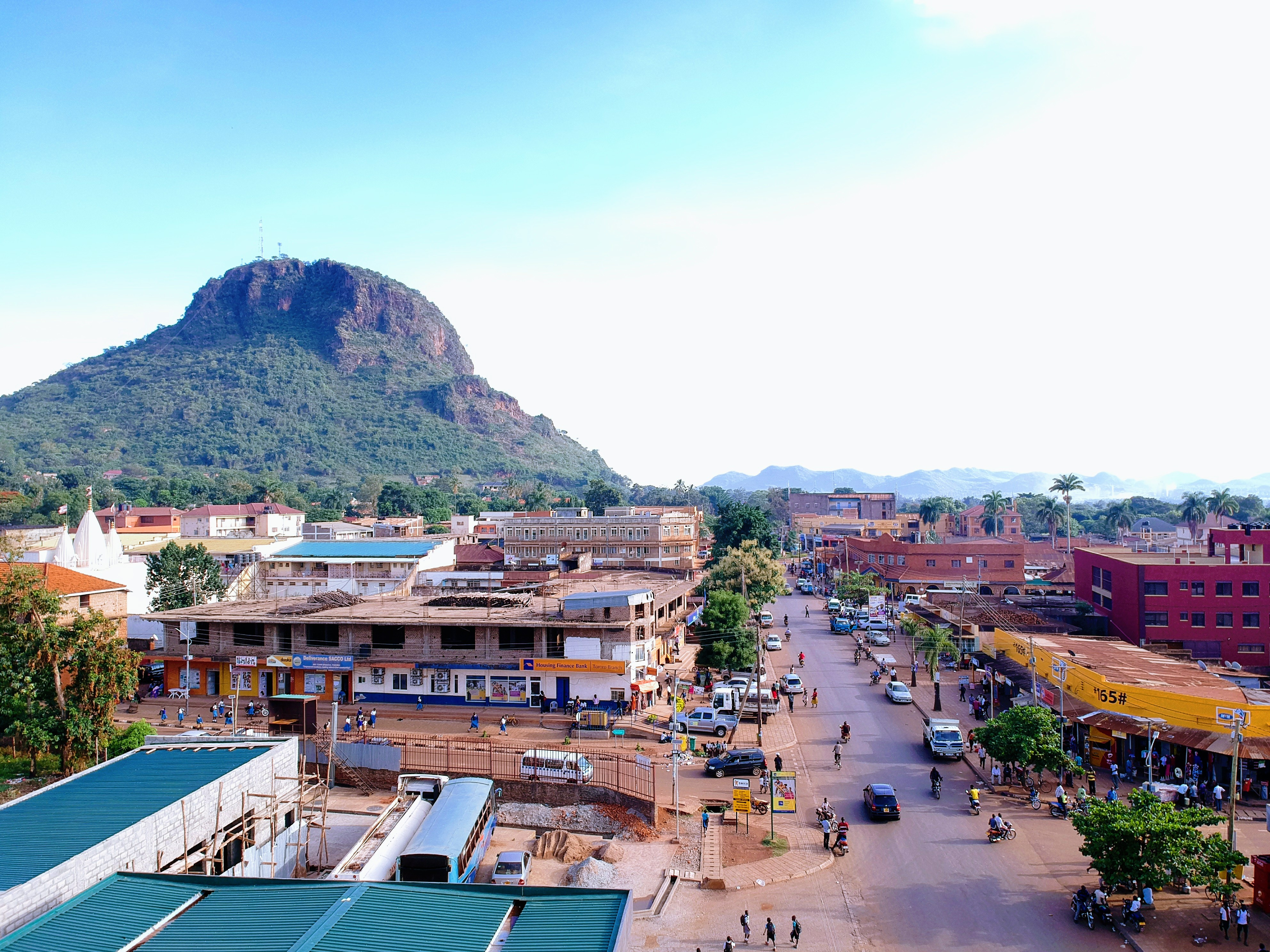
Tororo town

Mifumi is a village in Kirewa sub-county, Tororo District, Uganda.

Mifumi is located approximately 35 km from Tororo town. In order to get there, you may take public transport via shared minibus to Katande and then a hired bicycle (boda-boda) to Mifumi.

The village is the base for a development charity, MIFUMI. The Mifumi Primary School has a nursery section, 11 classrooms, administration block and a community centre, which doubles as the local church. It is supported by MIFUMI, an international aid and development agency. A health centre has been established as well as domestic violence advice centres.
