= Ahmadpur East Tehsil =

Ahmadpur East Tehsil تحصیل احمدپور شرقیہ
- Tehsil
- Location in Pakistan
- Coordinates: 29°09′N 71°16′E
- Country: Pakistan
- Province: (Punjab, Pakistan) Punjab
- District: Bahawalpur
- Headquarter: Ahmedpur East

Area
  - Tehsil: 1,738 km^{2} (671 sq mi)

Population (2023)
  - Tehsil: 1,307,578
  - Density: 752.3/km^{2} (1,949/sq mi)
  - Urban: 348,695 (26.67%)
  - Rural: 958,883 (73.33%)

Literacy (2023)
  - Literacy rate: 39.68%
- Time zone: UTC+5 (PST)
- Postal code: 63350
- Area code: 06222

Ahmadpur East or Ahmadpur Sharqia (Punjabi, Saraiki, Urdu: تحصِيل احمدپُور شرقیہ) is one of the five tehsils, or administrative subdivisions, of Bahawalpur District in the Punjab province of Pakistan.

Ahmedpur East was built by Ahmed Khan son of Qadir Din Khan and grandson of Piruj Khan, in 1748 A.D. The city was badly damaged by the heavy floods from Ghara River, during 1758 A.D. A new city on a mound half a mile to the south of previous site was selected for the present city.

== History ==
The city of Ahmadpur East was once the capital of the former Princely State of Bahawalpur.

Ahmedpur East was built by Ahmed Khan son of Qadir Din Khan and grandson of Piruj Khan, in 1748 A.D. The City was badly damaged by the heavy floods from Ghara River, during 1758 A.D. A new City on a mound half a mile to the South of previous site was selected for the present City. Ahmed khan pirjani have 8 sons which are given below:-Brahim khan, Daud khan, Islam khan, Alam khan, Mohabbat khan, Qabil khan, Qadir dina khan, Qutab khan

== Geography and climate ==
The city lies just south east of the Head Panjnad. It is situated 50 km from Bahawalpur, 470 km from Lahore, 15 km from Uch Shareef, 60 km from Yazman, 320 km from Faisalabad and about 750 km from the national capital, Islamabad. The west region of the city is called the Sindh. The chief crops are wheat, gram, cotton, sugarcane, dates, citrus and mangoes. Sheep and cattle are raised for export of wool and hides. It is chiefly desert irrigated by the Sutlej inundation canals and yields crops of wheat, cotton, and sugarcane. Farther south, the Cholistan, is a barren desert tract, bounded on the north and west by the Hakra depression with mound ruins of old settlements along its high banks; it is still inhabited by nomads.

The climate is mainly hot and dry. In summer's the temperature reaches high forties degrees Celsius during the day and the nights slightly cooler. Since the city is located in a desert environment there is little rainfall. The weather conditions in area reach extremes in both summer and winter. Average temperature in summer is 33c and 18c in winter. Rainfall is very scarce and scanty. The average rainfall is 20 to 25 cm annually

== Demographics ==
=== Population ===
Historical population
Year	Pop.	±% p.a.
1951	187,965	—
1961	240,681	+2.50%
1972	344,318	+3.31%
1981	443,750	+2.86%
1998	718,297	+2.87%
2017	1,078,683	+2.16%
2023	1,307,578	+3.26%

According to 2023 census, There were 1,307,578 people living in Ahmadpur East Tehsil, up from 1,078,683 in 2017. The average household size in Ahmadpur East Tehsil is 6.57 persons. Urban centers within the tehsil include Ahmedpur East Municipal Committee with a population of 196,618 and Uch Sharif Municipal Committee with 98,852 residents.

=== Languages ===
Languages of Ahmadpur East Tehsil (2023)
1. Saraiki (92.5%)
2. Punjabi (4.30%)
3. Urdu (2.30%)
4. Others (0.90%)

The primary languages spoken are Saraiki (1,209,395 speakers), Punjabi (55,731), and Urdu (29,838), followed by Pushto (4,364), Hindko (3,431), Balochi (150), and others.

== Economy ==
Ahmedpur East is also an important agricultural training and educational center. Soapmaking and cotton ginning are important enterprises; cotton, silk, embroidery, carpets, and extraordinarily delicate pottery are produced. Factories producing cottonseed oil and cottonseed cake were built in the 1970s. It is an important marketing center for the surrounding areas and is located on the crossroads between Peshawar, Lahore, Quetta and Karachi. Ahmedpur East is also known for its distinctly embroidered khusa and pottery which is made here.

The surrounding area is mostly agricultural, which allows agricultural exports in many parts of the world. There is also a large market town for mangoes, dates, wheat, sugarcane, and cotton that bring in continuous demand all year round. In addition, it has soap making and cotton spinning factories".

== Culture ==
The east side of the city, Ahmadpur East, is a tourist destination not only for locals but also an important for historians and archeologists due to its rich heritage. The City Contains Sadiq Garh Palace , a UNESCO world heritage site, which Was Built In 1882 By His Majesty Nawab Sadiq Muhammad Khan Abbasi (IV). The Derawar Fort is also in Ahmadpur East tehsil. Ahmedpur East is known for its cotton, silk, embroidery, carpets, and extraordinarily delicate pottery.

== The saints of Ahmadpur Tehsil ==
(1) Syed Mohammad Abdullah Shah Madni Jilani, son of Syed Abdul Rehman Jilani Dehlvi and a descendant of Sheikh Abdul Qadir Jilani. Born and raised in Medina, he walked miles between Mecca and Madina in the heat. He then spent least 12 years of service at the Masjid-e-Nabwi and had a dream where Mohammad ordered him to find his murshid Sultan Bahu. He met Sultan Bahu on the 12th Rabi' al-awwal. During the reign of Nawab Bahawal Khan III, he migrated from Medina to Ahmadpur East for a permanent residence from 29th Ramazan 1241 H/6 May 1826 AD. He died on Friday of 29th Ramazan 1276 H/20 April 1860. His shrine is situated at Fatani Chowk, Fatani Street, Ahmadpur East. He was the 26th Shaikh of the Sarwari Qadri Order.

(2) Makhdoom Bahaudin Akbar, belonging to Bahaudin Zikarya’s 18th generation of descendants. He migrated from Multan to Ahmadpur East. He died in 26 Ramazan 1267/24 January 1851. He belongs to the Suhrawardiyya Order.

(3) Azmat Sultan, a descendant of Sultan Bahu. His father, Sultan Mohammad Hussain was a Sufi dervish. Azmat Sultan migrated to Ahmadpur East along with his family and resided there. It was here that he died and his shrine is also located here.

(4) Abdul Asad Khan Afghan: There is a khanqah by the name of Abdul Asad Khan in Ahmadpur East. He is known as being the khalifah of Khawaja Aaqil Mohammad.

(5) Noor Shah Bukhari: In Ahmadpur Sharqia, his shrine is located near Qilla Tehsil. He is from the progeny of Syed Jalal Bukhari. He spent most of his time in the Zikr of Allah. The order of his followers initiated at the desert area.

(6) Molvi Hakeem Gul Mohammad: His khanqah exists in Ahmadpur East. His family was prominent for its knowledge and herbal tips. The shrines of his ancestors still exist in Multan and Uch, Pakistan. He was the khalifah and a disciple of Aaqil Mohammad. His family lineage and biography is preserved in his writing Takmala Sharif.

(7) Khawaja Muhammad Abdul Malik Siddique belongs to Ahmad Pur Sharkia. He was the Peer-e-Tariqat of Naqashbandi Golden Chain. Khawaja Muhammad Abdul Malik Siddique was Khalifa of Peer Fazal Ali Qureshi of Miskeen Pur sharif District Muzaffar Garh. Now his son Khawaja Abdul Majid Siddiqui is the Sajjada Nasheen of Khanqah Malikia. Khanqah. Khawaja Abdul Majid Siddiqu is Khalifa of Peer Shaikh Mufti Muhammad Fareed Sahib in Naqashbandi.

== See also ==
- List of people from Ahmedpur East
- The Bahawalpur (A Princely State)
- Districts of Pakistan
  - Districts of Khyber Pakhtunkhwa, Pakistan
  - Districts of Punjab, Pakistan
  - Districts of Balochistan, Pakistan
  - Districts of Sindh, Pakistan
  - Districts of Azad Kashmir
  - Districts of Gilgit-Baltistan
- Divisions of Pakistan
  - Divisions of Balochistan
  - Divisions of Khyber Pakhtunkhwa
  - Divisions of Punjab
  - Divisions of Sindh
  - Divisions of Azad Kashmir
  - Divisions of Gilgit-Baltistan
