= Okobie =

Okobie or Okogbe
- Village
- Interactive map of Okobie or Okogbe
- Country: Nigeria
- State: Rivers State
- Local Government Area: Ahoada West
- Time zone: UTC+1 (West Africa Time)

Okobie or Okogbe is a village in Ahoada West, Rivers State, Nigeria.

== See also ==
- Okobie road tanker explosion
