= Bike taxi =

Bike taxi or bicycle taxi may refer to:

- Boda boda, bicycle and motorcycle taxis found throughout East Africa
- Cycle rickshaw, a hatchback tricycle designed to carry passengers
- Motorcycle taxi, a motorcycle licensed to carry passengers
