= Yang Dacai =

Chinese politician

Yang Dacai (Chinese: 杨达才; pinyin: Yáng Dácái) is a Chinese former politician. He was the head of the Shaanxi province work safety administration when a viral photo of him at the scene of the Shaanxi bus–tanker crash showed him wearing a luxury timepiece caused a public outcry against corruption in China. Chinese netizens found images of Yang on Xina Weibo wearing at least 10 different watches. The Xi'an Intermediate People's Court issued a prison sentence of 14 years for taking bribes and possessing assets of unclear origin. Since Yang was smiling in the original photo and in images taken during his sentencing, he became known as the "smiling official" (Chinese: 微笑局长) as well as 'Brother Watch' (Chinese: 表哥).

== See also ==
- Human flesh search engine
