= Alexandria on the Indus =

Ancient city allegedly founded on the Indus and Panjnad Rivers

Coordinates: 29.2408°N 71.0523°E

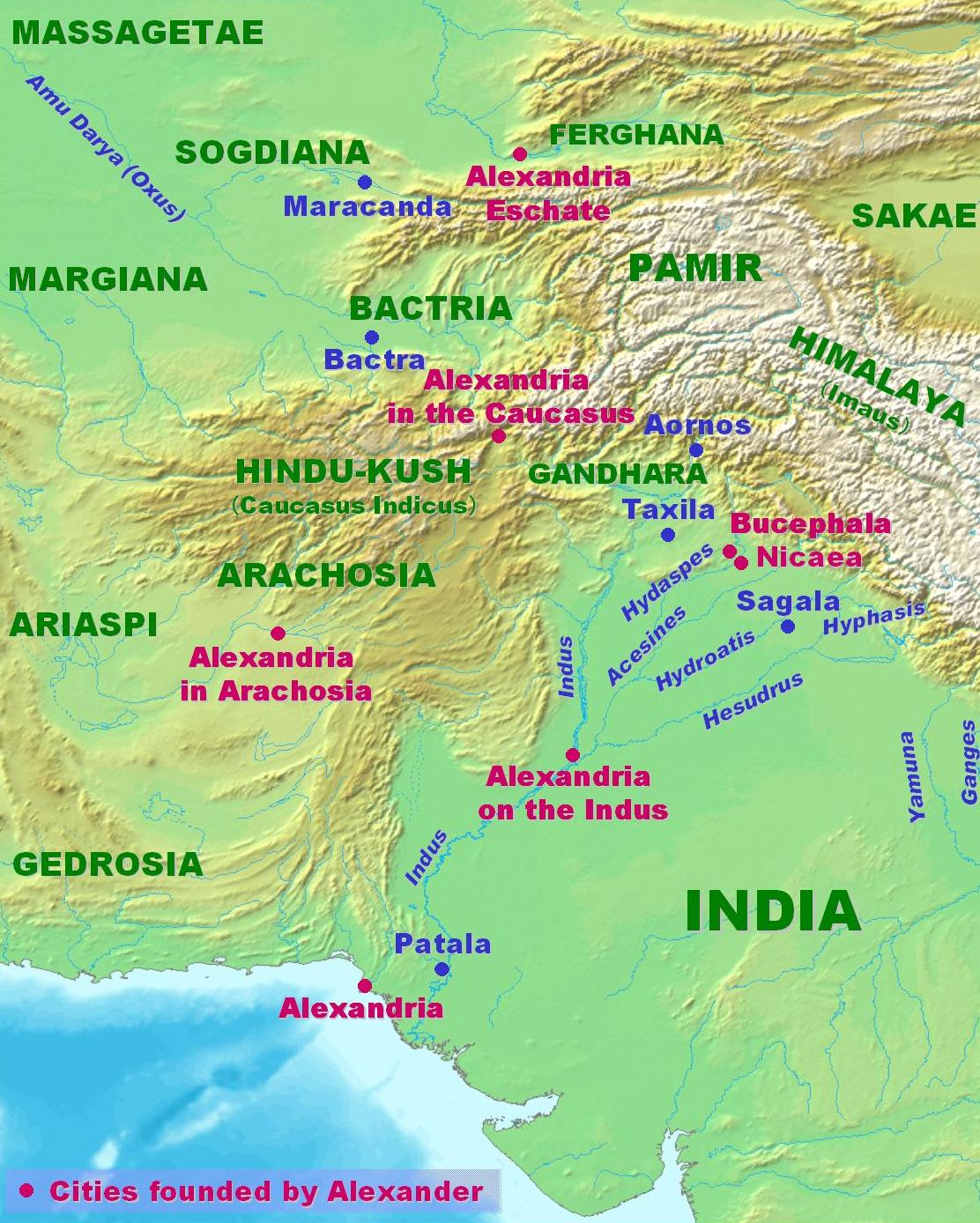
Alexander on the Indus is located at the junction of the Indus and the Acesines.

Alexandria on the Indus (Greek: Ἀλεξάνδρεια ἐπὶ Ἰνδῷ, likely modern Uch, Pakistan) was a city founded by Alexander the Great at the junction of the Indus and the Acesines river. Arrian tells that colonists, mainly Thracian veterans and natives, were settled there.

The satrap of the west bank of the Indus, Philip, son of Machatas, was put in charge of building the city:

He (Alexander) ordered him (Philip) to found a city there, just at the meeting of the two rivers, as he expected it would be great and famous in the world, and dockyards to be built.

Today, the remains of the Greek town are thought to be inside the citadel mound, although a shift in the river has caused significant damage to the mound. A UNESCO listing applies to the site.

== See also ==
- List of cities founded by Alexander the Great
