= Ahmedpur East =

City in Punjab, Pakistan

Ahmedpur East Ahmedpur Sharqia
- City
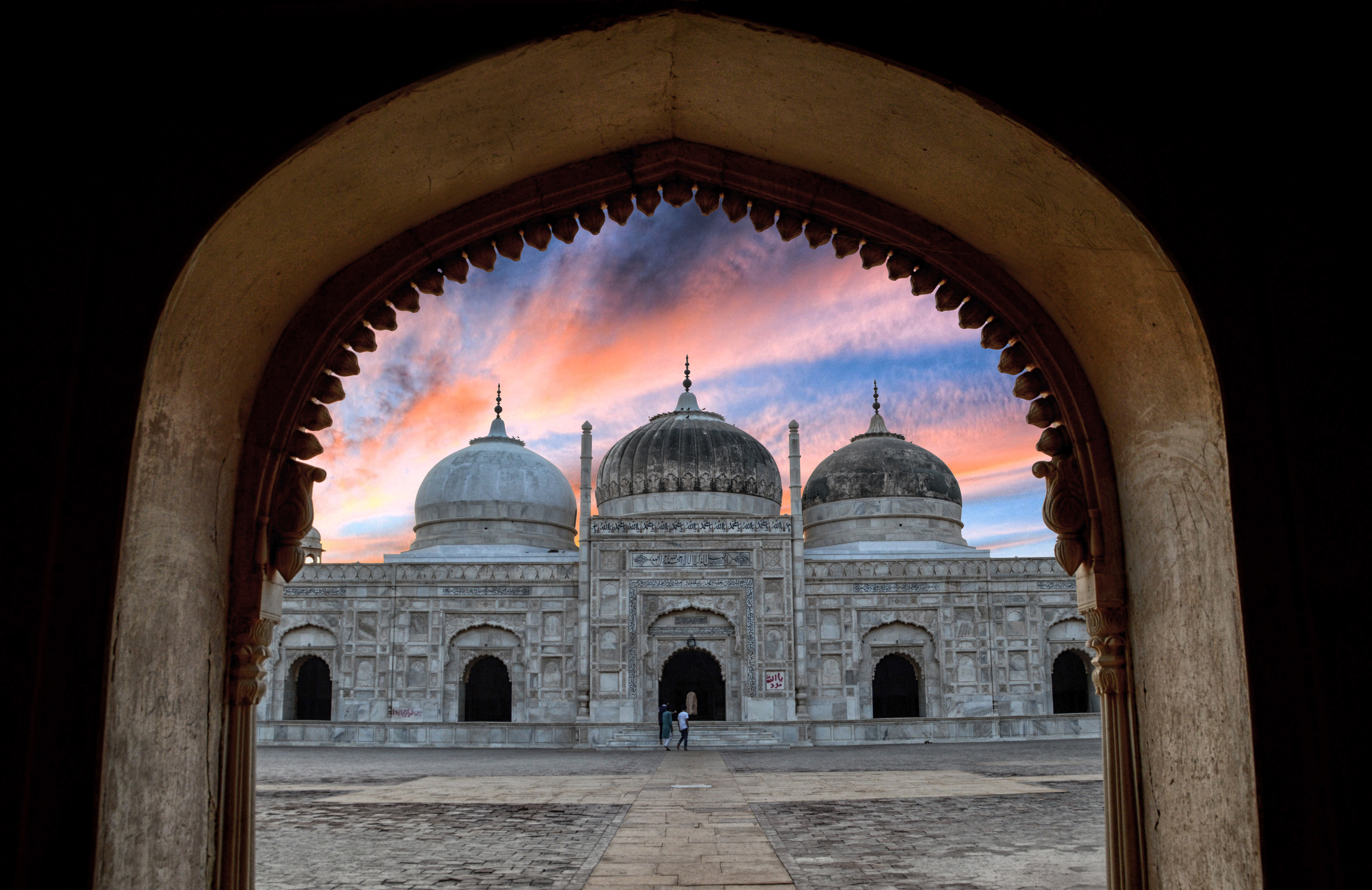
- The Abbasi Mosque at the nearby Derawar Fort

- Municipal Committee logo

- Location of Ahmedpur East Ahmedpur East (Pakistan)
- Coordinates: 29°8′38″N 71°15′33″E
- Country: Pakistan
- Province: Punjab
- District: Bahawalpur
- Number of Union councils: 32

Government
  - Type: Municipal Committee
  - Administrator / Chairman: Muhammad Naveed Haider
  - MNA (NA 183): Syed Sami ul Hassan Gilani (PTI)^{since 2018}
  - MPA (PP 268): Mian Gazain Abbasi (PTI) ^{since 2018}

Population (2023)
  - City: 196,718
  - Rank: 53rd in Pakistan
- Time zone: UTC+5 (PST)
  - Summer (DST): +5
- Postal code type: 63350
- Area code: 06222

Ahmedpur East (also known as Ahmadpur Sharqia) is a city located in Bahawalpur District in Punjab province of Pakistan. As of the 2023 census, the city has a population of approximately 196,618, making it the 53rd most populous city in Pakistan. The city is situated near the Cholistan Desert, offering a hot desert climate with extreme summers and mild winters.

Ahmedpur East was built by Ahmed Khan son of Qadir Din Khan and grandson of Piruj Khan, in 1748. The city was badly damaged by heavy floods from the Ghara River in 1758. A new city on a mound half a mile to the south of the previous site was selected for the present city.

== Demographics ==
Population

Historical population

Year	Pop.	±% p.a.
1951	26,220	—
1961	32,423	+2.15%
1972	43,312	+2.67%
1981	56,979	+3.09%

Year	Pop.	±% p.a.
1998	96,415	+3.14%
2017	133,369	+1.72%
2023	196,618	+6.68%

According to 2023 census, Ahmedpur East had a population of 196,618.

Languages

Languages of Ahmedpur East MC (2023 Census)
1. Saraiki (73.4%)
2. Punjabi (14.8%)
3. Urdu (9.10%)
4. Others (2.70%)

== Culture ==
The city of Ahmedpur East is a tourist destination for not only locals but provides an important hot spot for historians and archaeologists due to its rich heritage. The city contains the Sadiq Garh Palace and many old buildings which were built by Nawab Sadiq I. The Derawar Fort is also in Ahmedpur East Tehsil. Ahmedpur East is also known for its cotton, silk, embroidery, carpets, and extraordinarily delicate pottery.

== Nuclear power plant ==
According to The Wall Street Journal, Pakistan Atomic Energy Commission (PAEC) plans to install three Chinese nuclear reactors at Ahmedpur East and the site is now being prepared. The Ahmedpur East nuclear power complex would have 1100 MW nuclear reactor.

== 2017 oil tanker fire disaster ==
In 2017, Ahmedpur East was the site of a major disaster, when over 200 villagers collecting fuel from an overturned truck were killed in an accidental explosion. More than 70 among the injured died in burn centers. Updated numbers indicate that at least 200 people died in the explosion. The death toll of Ahmadpur East oil tanker tragedy reached to 219 when another victim died at the Nishtar Hospital, Multan.

As many as 94 victims died in different hospitals, including 18 at Jinnah Hospital, Lahore, 11 at Burns Ward of CMH, Bahawalpur, and 10 at Bahawal Victoria Hospital. However, 34 injured persons were under treatment at different hospitals, including 22 at BVH, five at THQ Hospital, Ahmadpur East, three at Nishtar Hospital, Multan, and four at Jinnah Hospital, Lahore.

According to the focal person appointed for giving details about the tragedy Dr. Amir Mahmood, 31 injured persons had been discharged after recovery. Meanwhile, relatives of several Ahmadpur East tragedy victims alleged that their financial aid cheque issued by the district government on the order of Punjab CM Shahbaz Sharif had been bounced by the banks concerned. The DC Office spokesman through the Information Department said that the claim was not true. The spokesperson said that if any cheque did not cash then the concerned families should immediately contact the DC Office.

== Education Facilities in Ahmedpur East ==
Apart from the Abbas Higher Secondary School and Army Public School at Dera Nawab Sahib, the city has two government postgraduate colleges. The city also has a government commerce college, Government Sadiq Abbas Degree College and a college for individuals who require special education.

Many private colleges such as Punjab College, Nimz College, Allama Iqbal College, United College, Millat College, Laurel College, City College, Oxford College, Amal College and many more are working there. A campus of the Virtual University of Pakistan is also situated here. There are about ten government high schools in the city and nearby area.

The city contains hundreds of private schools. Some of them are Allied School, Islamic Model Higher Secondary School, Country School System, The Educators, Dr AQ School System, The Smart School, Dar-e-Arqam School, EFA School System, The PACE School System and many more.

== Shrines of Sufi saints ==
- Syed Mohammad Abdullah Shah Madni Jilani, great grand son of Abdul Rehman Jilani Dehlvi and a descendant of Sheikh Abdul Qadir Gilani. Born and raised in Medina, he walked miles between Mecca and Medina in the heat. He then spent least 12 years of service at the Prophet's Mosque and had a dream where Prophet Muhammad ordered him to find his murshid Sultan Bahu. He met Sultan Bahu during the reign of Nawab Bahawal Khan III, he migrated from Medina to Ahmadpur East for a permanent residence from 6 May 1826. He died on 20 April 1860. His shrine is situated at Fatani Chowk, Fatani Street, Ahmadpur East. He is the 26th Shaikh of the Sarwari Qadiri Sufi order.
- Makhdoom Bahauddin Akbar, belonging to Bahauddin Zakariya's 18th generation of descendants. He migrated from Multan to Ahmadpur East. He died on 24 January 1851. He belonged to the Suhrawardiyya order.
- Azmat Sultan, a descendant of Sultan Bahu. His father, Sultan Mohammad Hussain was a Sufi dervish. Azmat Sultan migrated to Ahmadpur East along with his family and resided there. It was here that he died and his shrine is also located here.
- Abdul Asad Khan Afghan: There is a khanqah by the name of Abdul Asad Khan in Ahmadpur East. He is known as being the khalifah of Khawaja Aaqil Mohammad.
- Noor Shah Bukhari: His shrine is located near Qilla Tehsil. He is from the progeny of Jalaluddin Surkh-Posh Bukhari. He spent most of his time in the Zikr of Allah. The order of his followers initiated in the desert area.
- Molvi Hakeem Gul Mohammad: His khanqah exists in Ahmadpur East. His family was prominent for its knowledge and herbal tips. The shrines of his ancestors still exist in Multan and Uch, Pakistan. He was the khalifah and a disciple of Aaqil Mohammad. His family lineage and biography is preserved in his writing Takmala Sharif.
- Khawaja Muhammad Abdul Malik Siddique was the Peer-e-Tariqat of Naqshbandi-Haqqani Golden Chain. Khawaja Muhammad Abdul Malik Siddique was the khalifa of Peer Shaikh Mufti Muhammad Fareed Sahib and of Peer Fazal Ali Qureshi of Miskeen Pur Sharif, Muzaffargarh District. Now his son Khawaja Abdul Majid Siddiqui is the Sajjada Nashin of Khanqah Malikia.
- Molana Manzoor Ahmed Faizi was a scholar and Sufi from the Chishtia order.

== Abbasi Mosque ==
Abbasi Mosque, situated nearby, is a historical and significant mosque. This mosque was established in the year 1804 by Haji Allah Ditta Khoker, who laid its foundation stone. The design of Abbasiya Masjid closely resembles that of the famous Derawar Mosque, which is renowned for its grandeur and unique structure.

The mosque is known for its architecture and intricate details that make it a place of both spiritual significance and aesthetic appeal. Its spacious prayer hall is designed to accommodate a large number of worshippers, making it a central hub for the local Muslim community. In addition to the prayer space, the mosque features several important facilities, including a madrasa (Islamic school), where students are taught religious education, and a wuzu (ablution) area, which allows worshippers to perform the necessary ritual washing before prayers. There are also modern washrooms available for the convenience of the visitors.

Abbasiya Masjid has the capacity to accommodate almost 20,000 people for prayer.

The mosque is led by its imam, Qari Bashir Ahmed.

== Ghalla Mandi ==
The Ghalla Mandi in Ahmedpur East is a major agricultural marketplace, where farmers, traders, and vendors come together to buy and sell various commodities, particularly cotton. Located in the central region of the city, it plays a vital role in the local economy, serving as a hub for the agricultural community. The mandi is known for its bustling atmosphere, with a diverse range of goods being exchanged, including cotton, grains, and other produce.
