= List of people from Bahawalpur =

This is a list of notable people from Bahawalpur city and Bahawalpur District.

== A ==
- Abdul Rauf Azhar, Jaish-e-Mohammed leader, brother of Masood Azhar
- Abdul Rehman Makki, Lashkar-e-Taiba member
- Ajaz Akhtar, cricketer
- Muhammad Adil, Football Player
- Art Malik, British TV and film actor

== C ==
- Chaudhry Mumtaz Jajja politician

== M ==
- Masood Azhar, Jaish-e-Mohammed founder
- Motiullah, field hockey player
- Murtaza Hassan (Mastana), TV actor and stand-up comedian
- Murtaza Hussain, cricketer

== S ==
- Shabbir Ahmad Usmani, Muslim Sufi and scholar
- Shahid Khan, Pakistani-American billionaire businessman

== T ==
- Tariq Bashir Cheema

== Z ==
- Zaka Ashraf, businessman and PCB chairman
- Zia Ahmed, cricketer
