= Uch =

Uch: اچ; اوچ
- Town
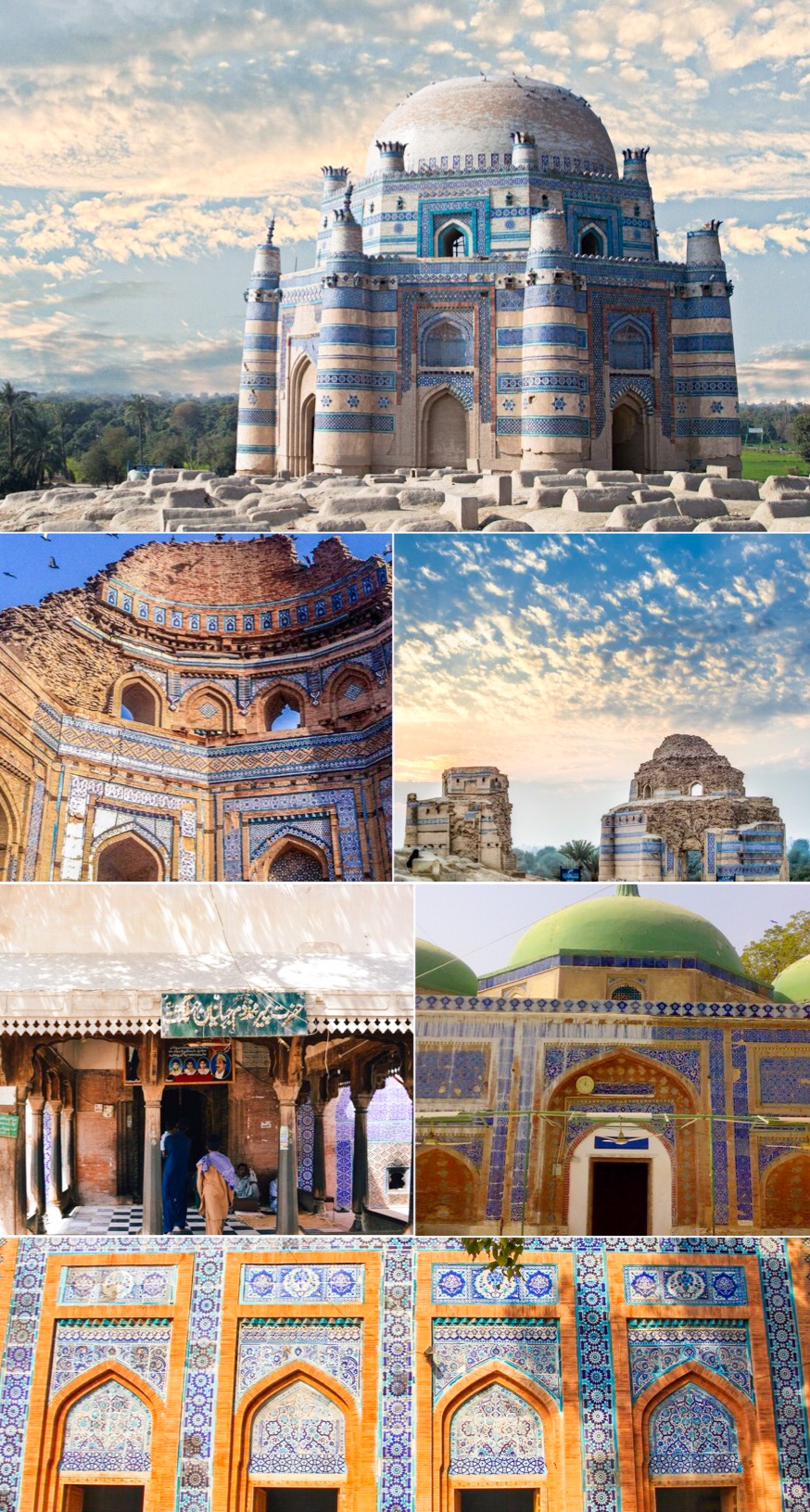
- The tomb of Bibi Jawindi from 1493, the tombs of Nuriya and Baha 'al Halim, mosque of Mahboob Subhani, the mosque at the shrine of Jahaniyan Jahangasht, entry to the shrine of Jahaniyan Jahangasht, exposed interior of the tomb of Baha'al Halim

- Location of Uch Uch (Pakistan) Uch (South Asia) Uch (Asia)
- Coordinates: 29°14′N 71°04′E
- Country: Pakistan
- Province: Punjab
- District: Bahawalpur District

Population (2023 census)
  - Total: 98,852
- Time zone: UTC+5 (PST)

Uch (Punjabi: اچ; Urdu: اوچ), frequently referred to as Uch Sharīf (Punjabi: اچ شریف; Urdu: اوچ شریف; "Noble Uch"), is a historic city in Pakistan's Punjab province. Uch may have been founded as Alexandria on the Indus, a town founded by Alexander the Great during his invasion of the Indus Valley. Uch was an early stronghold during the Muslim conquest of the subcontinent. It is also known as the home for the Naqvi or Bukharis after the migration from Bukhara. Uch was a regional metropolitan centre between the 12th and 17th centuries, and became refuge for Muslim religious scholars fleeing persecution from other lands. Though Uch is now a relatively small city, it is renowned for its intact historic urban fabric, and for its collection of shrines dedicated to Muslim mystics (Sufis) from the 12th to 15th centuries that are embellished with extensive tile work, and were built in the distinct architectural style of southern Punjab.

== Etymology ==
Uch Sharif was previous known by the name of Bhatiah until the 12th century. The origins of the city's current name are unclear. In one legend, Jalaluddin Surkh-Posh Bukhari, the renowned Central Asian Sufi mystic from Bukhara, arrived in Uch and converted the daughter of the town's ruler, Sunandapuri, to Islam. Upon her conversion, Jalaluddin Bukhari requested her to build a fortress which he named Uch, or "High." According to another version of the legend, the princess converted by Bukhari was actually a Buddhist princess named Ucha Rani, and the city's name derives from her. Uch was not universally recognized as the area's name for quite some time, and the city was not referred to by early Muslim historians by the name Uch. Uch, for example, is likely the town recorded as Bhatia that was invaded by Mahmud of Ghazni in 1006.

== History ==
=== Early ===
Uch Sharif may have been founded in 325 BCE by Alexander the Great as the city of Alexandria on the Indus (Greek: Ἀλεξάνδρεια ἡ ἐν Ἰνδῷ), according to British officer and archaeologist Alexander Cunningham. The city was reportedly settled by natives of the Greek region of Thrace, and was located at the confluence of the Acesines river with the Indus. Uch was once located on the banks of the Indus River, though the river has since shifted its course, and the confluence of the two rivers has shifted approximately 40 km (25 miles) southwest.

=== Medieval ===
In 712 CE, Muhammad bin Qasim conquered Uch. Few details exist of the city in the centuries prior to his invasion. Uch was probably the town recorded as Bhatia that was conquered in 1006 by Mahmud of Ghazni. Following the schism between the Nizari and Musta'li sects of Ismaili Shi'ism in 1094, Uch became a centre of Nizari missionary activity for several centuries, and today the town and surrounding region are littered with numerous tombs of prominent pīrs, as well as pious daughters and wives of those Sufi pirs.

The region around Uch and Multan remained centre of Hindu Vaishnavite and Surya pilgrimage throughout the medieval era. Their interactions with Ismaili tradition resulted in the creation of the Satpanth tradition. Throughout this era, Uch was at the centre of a region that was steeped in both Vedic and Islamic traditions. The city would later become a centre of Suhrwadi Sufism, with the establishment of the order by Bahauddin Zakariya in nearby Multan in the early 1200s.

Muhammad of Ghor conquered Uch and nearby Sultan in 1176 while it was still under the influence of the Ismaili Qarmatians. The town was likely captured from the Soomras based in Sindh. Sindh's various dynasties had for centuries attempted to keep Uch and Multan under their sway.

=== Mamluk era ===
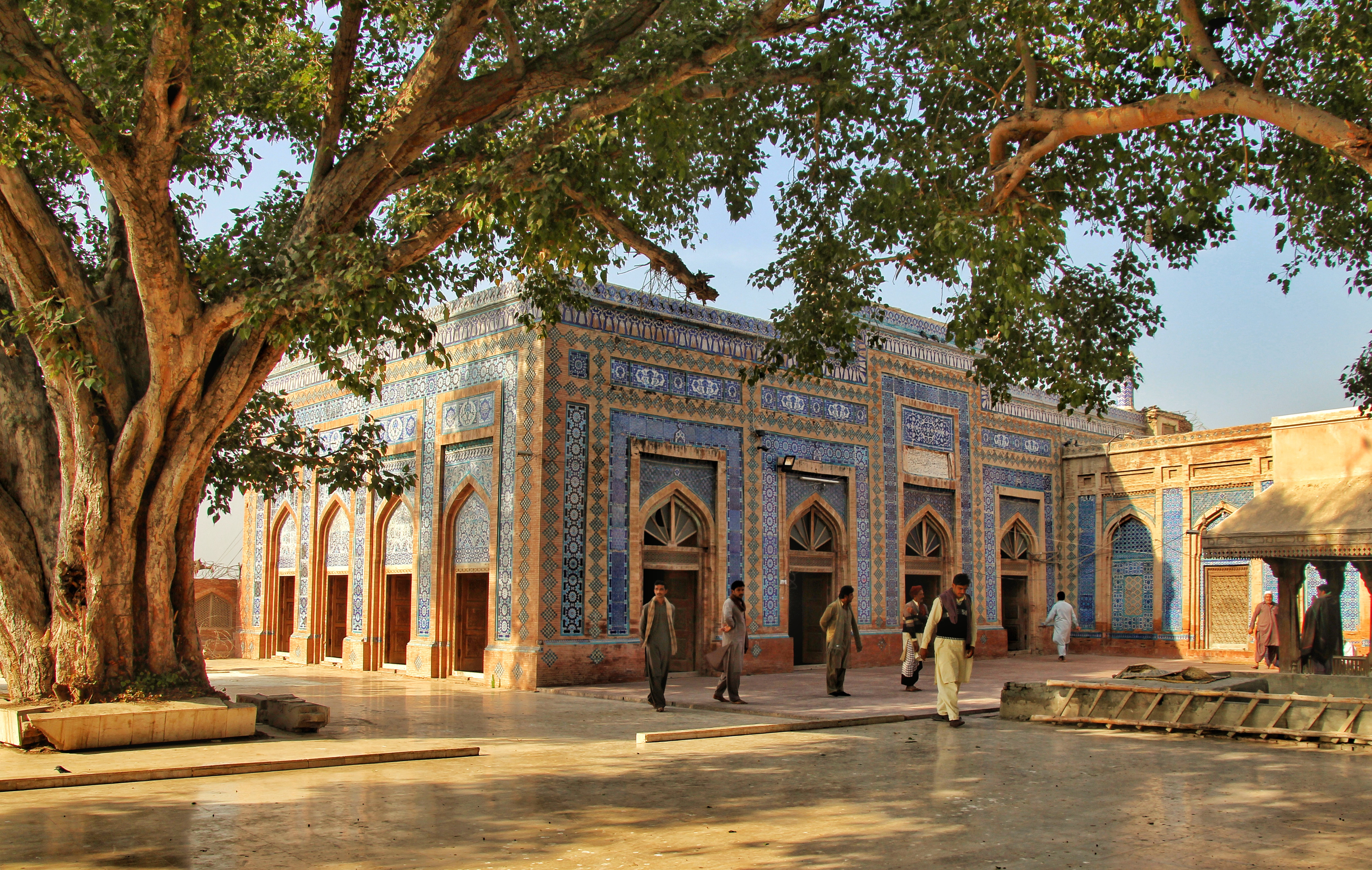
The mosque of Makhdoom Jahanian was built in the late 1300s, and is embellished with the blue tile-work typical of southern Punjab.

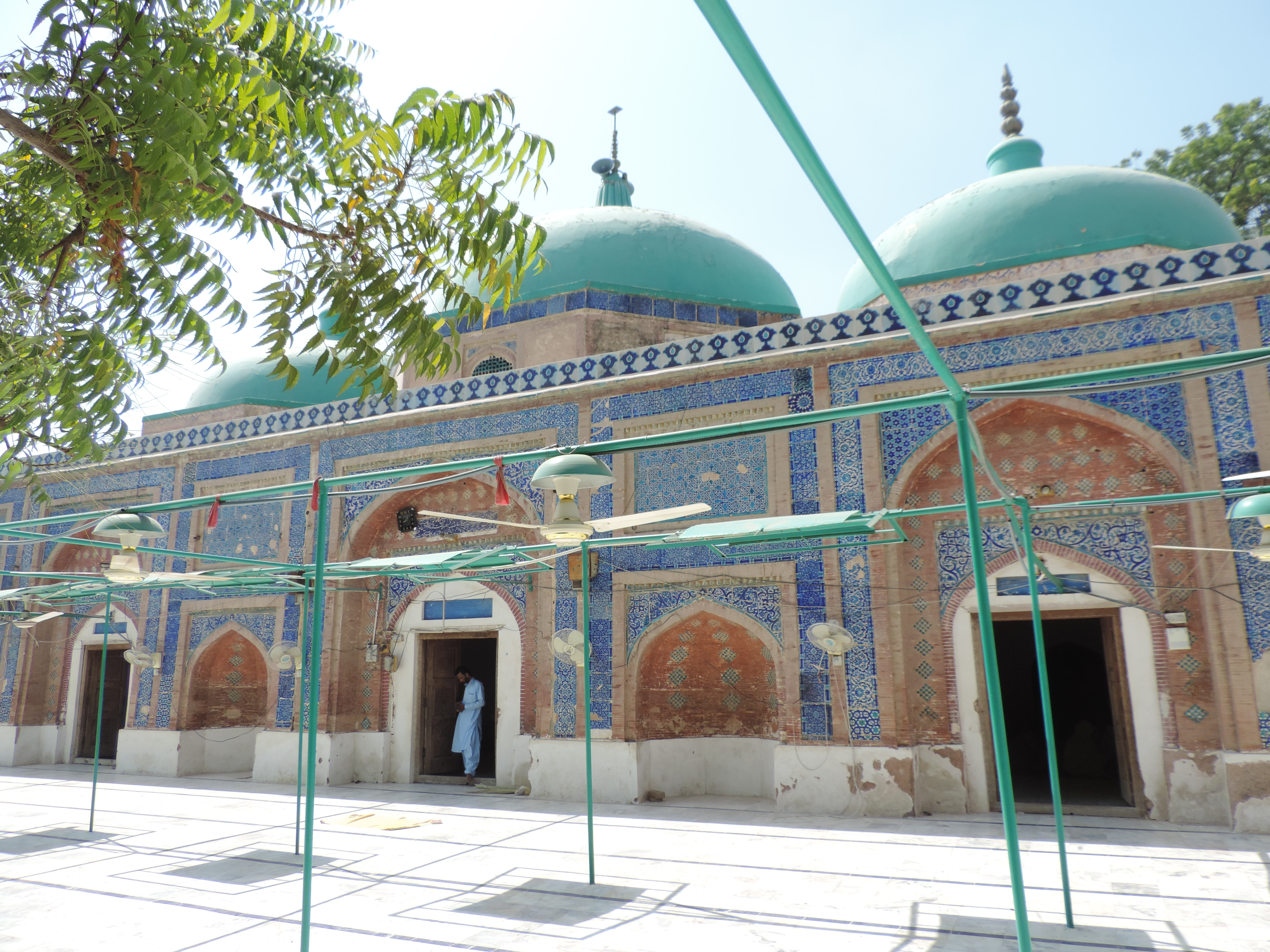
The mosque of Mahboob Subhani is decorated in the region's vernacular style.

Soomra power was eroded by the advance of Nasir ad-Din Qabacha of what would later become the Mamluk dynasty of the Delhi Sultanate. Qabacha was declared Governor of Uch in 1204, he also controlled Multan and Sindh regions. Under his rule, Uch became the principal city of Upper Sindh. Qabacha declared independence for his principality centred on Uch and Multan after the death of Sultan Aybak in 1211, before marching onwards to capture Lahore, thereby placing Qabacha's new Uch Sultanate in conflict with Sultan Iltutmish in Delhi. Qabacha briefly lost control of Uch to Taj al-Din Yildiz, though Uch was quickly returned to Qabacha's rule.

While the power struggle ensued among Qabacha and Iltuthmish, Uch came under further pressure from the Khwarazmian dynasty based in Samarkand that had been displaced by the Mongol armies of Genghis Khan. Following the defeat of his father by the Mongols in the mid 1210s, the last Khwarazmian Sultan, Jalal al-Din Mangburni, sacked and conquered Uch in 1224 after Qabacha refused to aid him in a campaign against Genghis Khan. Jalal al-Din Mangburni was finally defeated by Genghis Khan in 1224 in a battle at Uch, and was forced to flee to Persia. Khan attacked Multan on his return to Iran in 1224, though Sultan Qabacha was able to successfully defend that city. Despite repeated invasions, the city remained a great centre of Muslim scholarship, as evidenced by the appointment of the renowned Persian historian Minhaj-i-Siraj as chief of the city's Firozi madrasa.

In 1228, Qabacha's forces, weakened by Mongol and Khwarazmian invasions, lost Uch to Sultan Iltutmish of Delhi, and fled south to Bhakkar in Sindh, where he was eventually captured and drowned in the Indus River as punishment. Following the collapse of Qabacha's sultanate at the hands of Mongols and Khwarazmians, and the degradation of Lahore from years of conflict there, Muslim power in north India shifted away from Punjab and towards the safer environs of Delhi.

=== Mongol and Timurid invasions ===
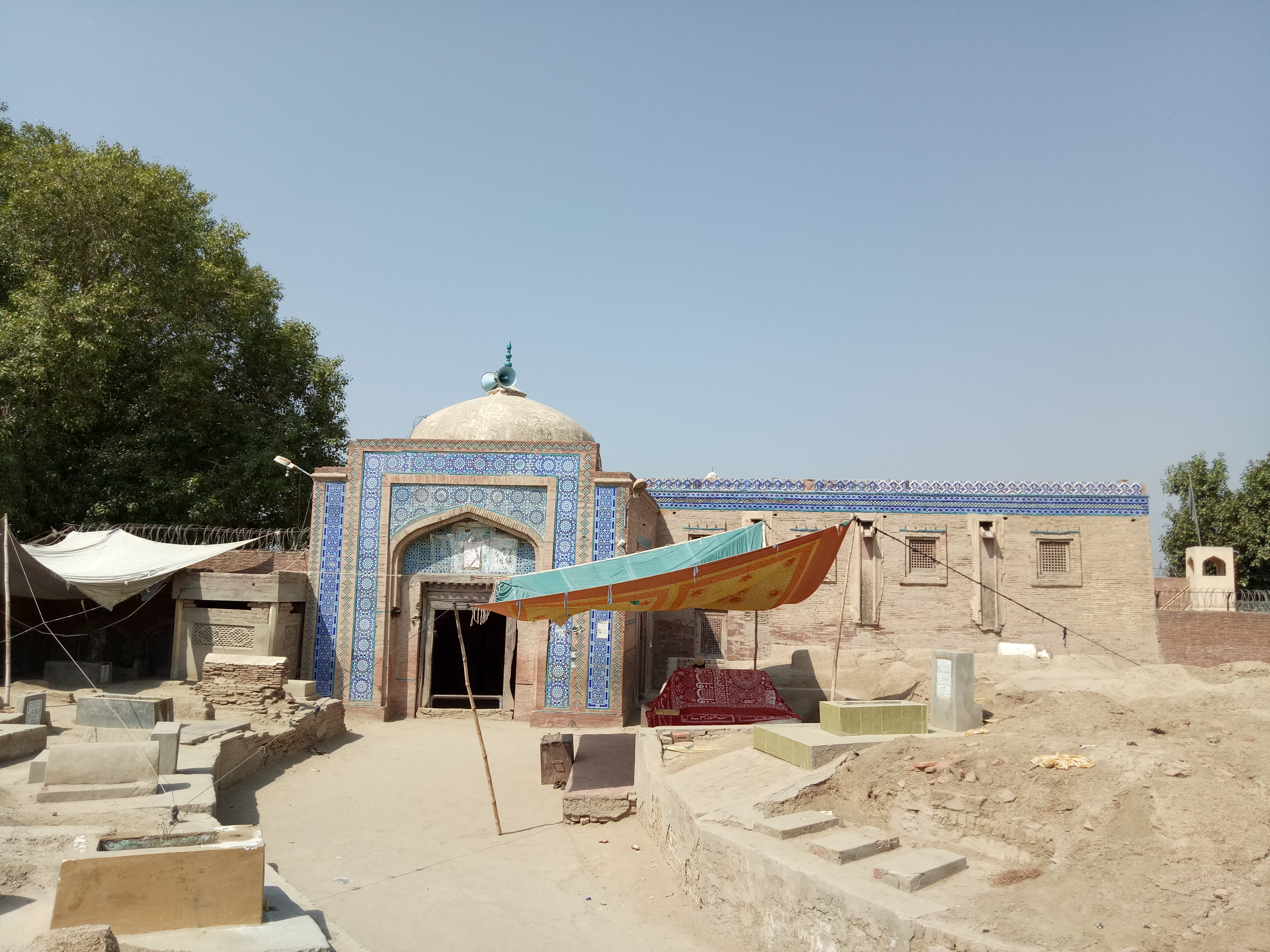
The shrine of Jalaluddin Bukhari is dedicated to Uch's celebrated 13th century Sufi saint.

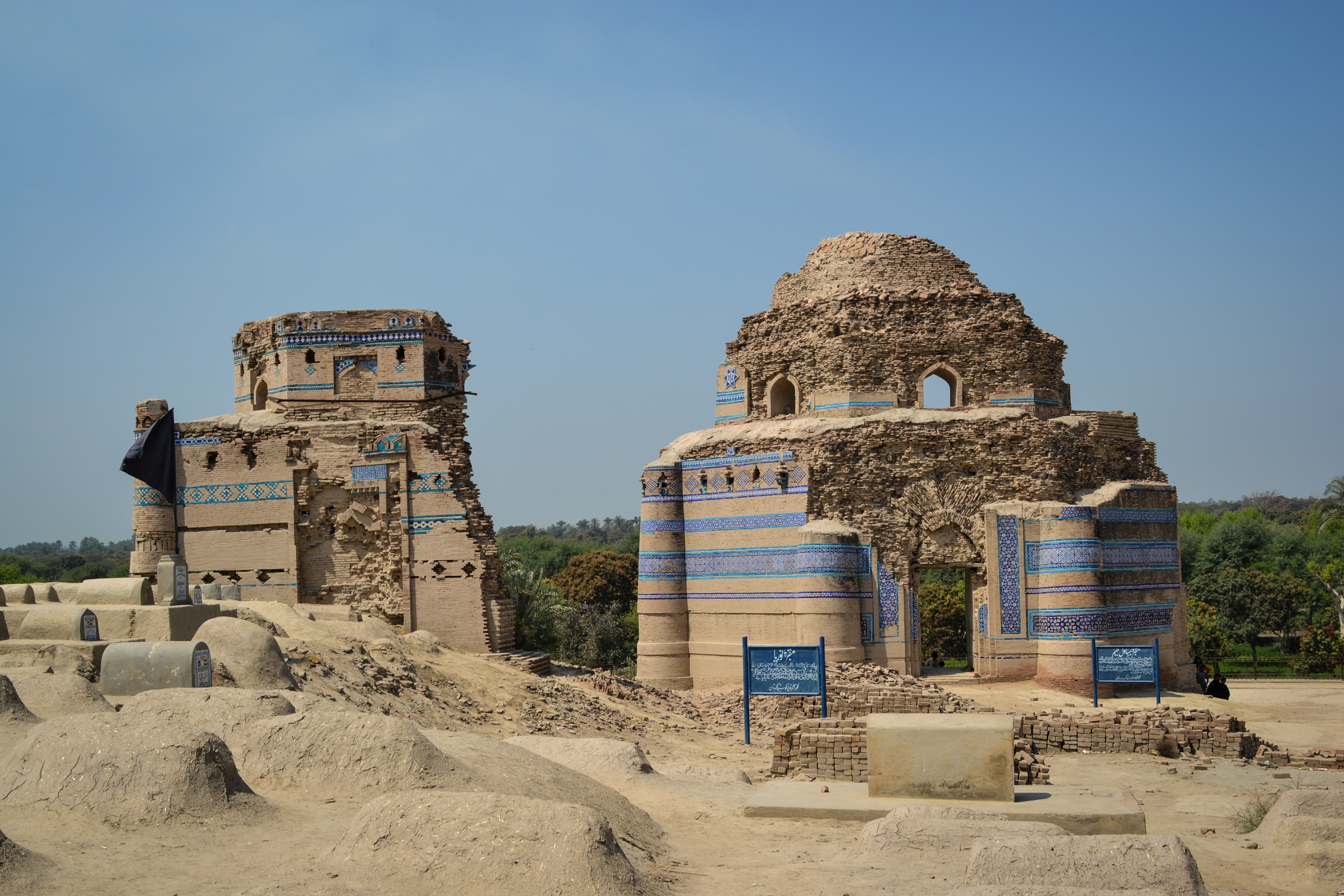
The Baha'al Halim and Nuriyas tombs were built in the 14th and 16th centuries, respectively.

One of Uch's most celebrated saints, Jalaluddin Surkh-Posh Bukhari, migrated to Uch from Bukhara in 1244–45. In 1245–46, the Mongols again invaded Uch under Möngke Khan after receiving aid from the local Khokhar tribes. in 1252, forces from Delhi were sent to the region in order to secure Uch from Mongol raiders, though Uch was again raided in 1258. Uch was raided yet again by Mongols in 1304 and 1305. Following the 1305 invasion, Uch came under the governorship of Ghazi Malik the governor of Multan and Depalpur, who would later seize Delhi and come to be known as Ghiyath al-Din Tughluq, founder of the Tughlaq dynasty of the Delhi Sultanate. Uch was captured in 1398 by Pir Muhammad ibn Jahangir, grandson of Tamerlane, allowing Khizr Khan to regain control of the area, before joining with the forces of the elder Tamerlane to sack Delhi and establish the Sayyid dynasty in 1414.

=== Langah sultanate ===
Uch Sharif then came under the control of the Langah Sultanate in the early 15th century, founded in nearby Multan by Budhan Khan, who assumed the title Mahmud Shah. During the rule of Shah Husayn Langah, large numbers of Baloch settlers were invited to settle the region. The city was placed under the jagir governorship of a Samma prince. In the mid-1400s, Muhammad Ghaus Gilani, a descendant of the Persian saint Abdul Qadir Gilani, established a Khanqah monastery in Uch, thereby establishing the city as a centre of the Qadiriyya Sufi order which would later become the dominant order of Punjab. Following the death of Shah Husayn, Uch's Samma rulers quickly allied themselves with Baloch chieftain Mir Chakar Rind.

=== Mughal ===
Guru Nanak, the founder of Sikhism, is believed to have visited Uch Sharif in the early 1500s, and left behind 5 relics, after meeting with the descendants of Jalaludin Bukhari. In 1525 Uch was invaded by rulers of the Arghun dynasty of northern Sindh, before falling to the forces of Pashtun king Sher Shah Suri in 1540.

Mughal Emperor Humayun entered Uch in late 1540, but was not welcomed by the city's inhabitants, and was defeated by the forces of Sher Shah Suri. The city reverted to Arghun rule following the expulsion of Humayun, and the fall of Sher Shah Suri's short-lived empire.

Uch Sharif became a part of the Mughal Empire during the reign of Akbar, and the city was a district of Multan province. Under Mughal rule, the city continued to flourish as a centre of religious scholarship. It was listed in the Ain-i-Akbari as a pargana in sarkar Multan, counted as part of the Bīrūn-i Panjnad ("Beyond the Five Rivers"). It was assessed at 1,910,140 dams in revenue and supplied a force of 100 cavalry and 400 infantry.

In 1680, the renowned Punjabi poet, Bulleh Shah, who is regarded as a saint by both Sufis and Sikhs, was born in Uch. In 1751, Uch was attacked by Sardar Jahan Khan, general in the army of Ahmad Shah Durrani.

=== Under the State of Bahawalpur ===
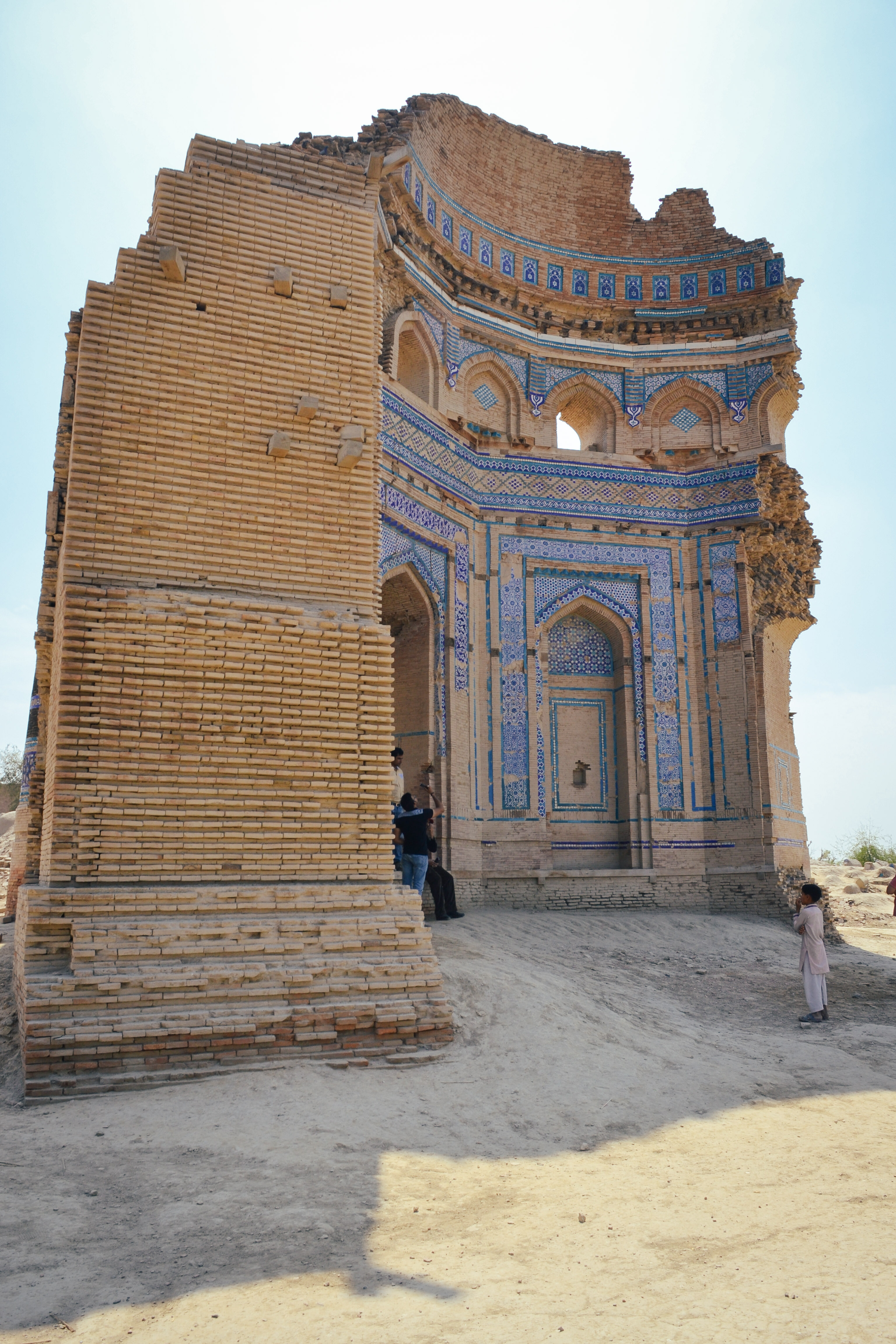
Several of Uch's monuments were damaged in flooding in the early 19th century, leaving their interiors exposed.

Uch Sharif came under the control of the Bahawalpur princely state, which declared independence in 1748 following the collapse of the Durrani empire. Bahawalpur had become a vassal of the Sikh Empire under Maharaja Ranjit Singh, before becoming a dependency of the British Empire defined under an 1833 treaty. By 1836, the ruling Abbasi family stopped paying tribute to the Sikhs, and declared independence. Bahawalpur's ruling Abbasi family aligned themselves with the British during the First and Second Anglo-Sikh Wars, thereby guaranteeing its survival as a princely state.

Flooding in the early 19th century caused serious damage to many of the city's tombs, including structural problems and the deterioration of masonry and finishes.

=== Modern ===
Upon the independence of Pakistan in 1947, Uch Sharif had a population of around 2–3,000 people. As part of Bahawalpur state, Uch Sharif was acceded to the new Pakistani state, but remained part of the autonomous Bahawalpur state until 1955 when it was fully amalgamated into Pakistan. Uch remains a relatively small city, but is an important tourist and pilgrimage destination on account of its numerous tombs and shrines.

== Demographics ==
=== Population ===
Historical population
Year	Pop.	±% p.a.
1951	4,170	—
1961	5,483	+2.78%
1972	8,491	+4.06%
1981	13,386	+5.19%
1998	20,476	+2.53%
2017	42,684	+3.94%
2023	98,852	+15.02%

The population of city in 1998 was 20,476 but according to the 2023 Census of Pakistan, the population has risen to 98,852.

Languages

Languages of Uch Sharif MC (2023 Census)
1. Saraiki (93.3%)
2. Punjabi (4.30%)
3. Urdu (0.90%)
4. Others (1.50%)

== Geography ==
Uch Sharif is located 84 km away from Bahawalpur. Formerly located at the confluence of the Indus and Chenab rivers, the river shifted course, and is now 25 miles (40 km) from that confluence, which has moved to Mithankot. The city now lies on a large Alluvial plain near south of the Chenab river. To the southeast lay the vast expanses of the Cholistan Desert.

Uch Sharif is located at an elevation of 113 meters above sea level. Latitude of 29.23895° or 29° 14' 20" north and longitude 71.06148° or 71° 3' 41" east.

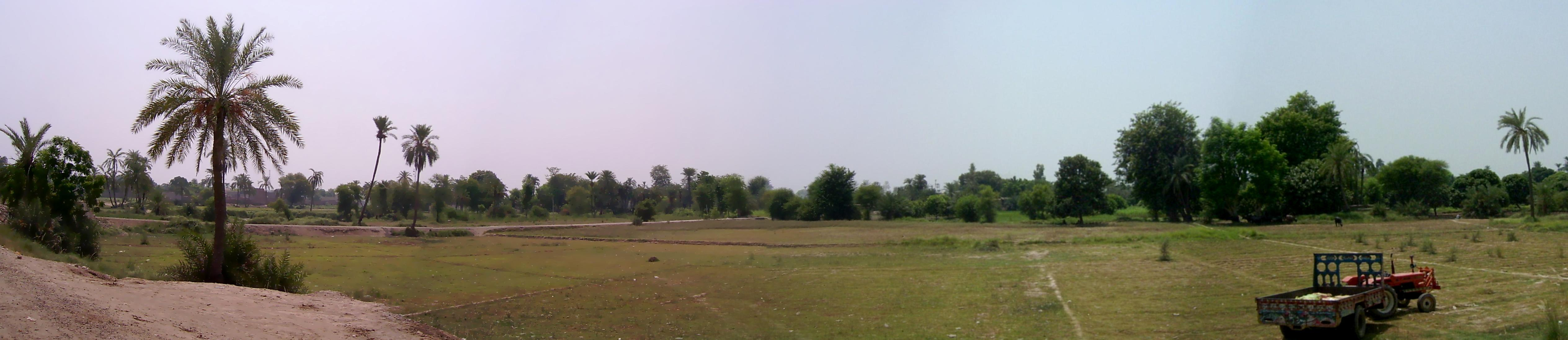
Uch is located on fertile alluvial plains which are now used for agriculture.

=== Cityscape ===
Uch Sharif has retained much of its historic urban fabric intact. The historic town is divided into three localities: Uch Bukhari, named for the saints from Bukhara, Uch Gilani (or Uch Jilani), named for the saints from Persia, and Uch Mughlia, named for the descendants of Mongol invaders who had settled in that quarter. Monuments are scattered throughout the city, and are connected by narrow lanes and winding bazaars. The most notable collection, called the Uch Monument Complex, is located at the old city's western edge. The old core is next to a large field used as a mela ground, or fair ground for urs festivals dedicated to the town's saints.

=== Climate ===
Uch features an arid climate (Köppen climate classification BWh) with very hot summers and mild winters.

Climate data for nearby Multan
Month	Jan	Feb	Mar	Apr	May	Jun	Jul	Aug	Sep	Oct	Nov	Dec	Year
Record high °C (°F)	28.3 (82.9)	32.0 (89.6)	39.0 (102.2)	45.0 (113.0)	48.9 (120.0)	52.0 (125.6)	52.2 (126.0)	45.0 (113.0)	42.5 (108.5)	40.6 (105.1)	36.0 (96.8)	29.0 (84.2)	52.2 (126.0)
Mean daily maximum °C (°F)	21.0 (69.8)	23.2 (73.8)	28.5 (83.3)	35.5 (95.9)	40.4 (104.7)	42.3 (108.1)	39.2 (102.6)	38.0 (100.4)	37.2 (99.0)	34.6 (94.3)	28.5 (83.3)	22.7 (72.9)	32.6 (90.7)
Daily mean °C (°F)	12.7 (54.9)	15.4 (59.7)	21.0 (69.8)	27.5 (81.5)	32.4 (90.3)	35.5 (95.9)	33.9 (93.0)	33.0 (91.4)	31.0 (87.8)	26.4 (79.5)	19.7 (67.5)	14.1 (57.4)	25.2 (77.4)
Mean daily minimum °C (°F)	4.5 (40.1)	7.6 (45.7)	13.5 (56.3)	19.5 (67.1)	24.4 (75.9)	28.6 (83.5)	28.7 (83.7)	28.0 (82.4)	24.9 (76.8)	18.2 (64.8)	10.9 (51.6)	5.5 (41.9)	17.9 (64.1)
Record low °C (°F)	−2 (28)	−1 (30)	3.3 (37.9)	9.4 (48.9)	13.5 (56.3)	20.0 (68.0)	21.1 (70.0)	21.1 (70.0)	16.7 (62.1)	8.9 (48.0)	0.6 (33.1)	−1.1 (30.0)	−2 (28)
Average precipitation mm (inches)	7.2 (0.28)	9.5 (0.37)	19.5 (0.77)	12.9 (0.51)	9.8 (0.39)	12.3 (0.48)	61.3 (2.41)	32.6 (1.28)	10.8 (0.43)	1.7 (0.07)	2.3 (0.09)	6.9 (0.27)	186.8 (7.35)
Mean monthly sunshine hours	222.3	211.6	250.8	273.3	293.5	266.8	265.0	277.6	277.6	274.9	255.0	229.2	3,097.6
Source: NOAA (1961–1990)

== Uch Monument Complex ==
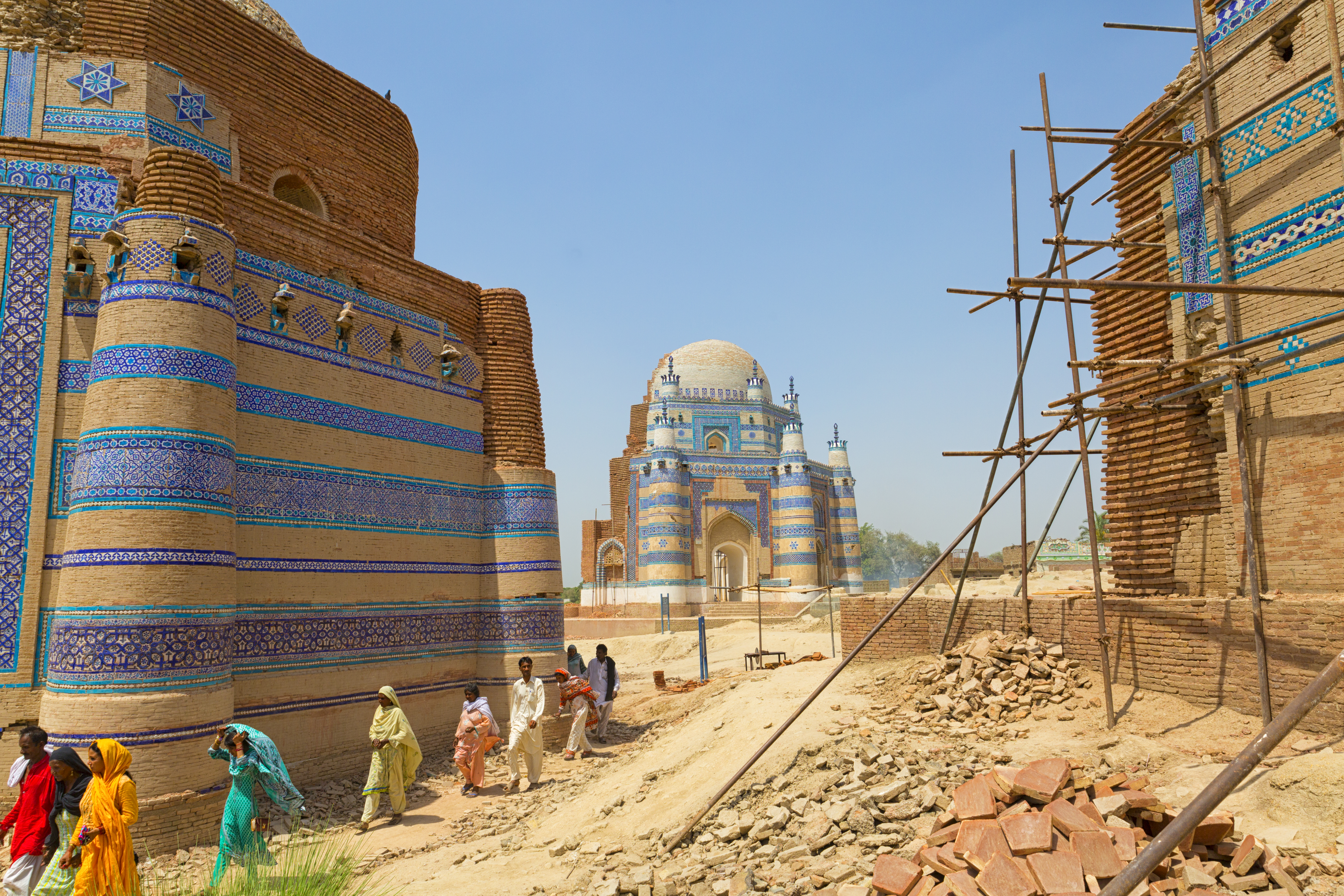
Some of the monuments are undergoing restoration work.

17 tiled funerary monuments and associated structures remain tightly knit into the urban fabric of Uch. The shrines, notably the tombs of Syed Jalaluddin Bukhari and his family, are built in a regional vernacular style particular to southern Punjab, with tile work imported from the nearby city of Multan. These structures were typically domed tombs on octagonal bases, with elements of Tughlaq military architecture, such as the addition of decorative bastions and crenellations.

Three shrines built over the course of 200 years are particularly well known, and along with an accompanying 1400 graves form the Uch Monument Complex, a site tentatively inscribed on the list of UNESCO World Cultural Heritage sites. Of the shrines, the first is said to have been built for Sheikh Baha’al-Halim by his pupil, the Suharwardiya Sufi saint Jahaniyan Jahangasht (1307–1383), the second for the latter's great-granddaughter, Bibi Jawindi, in 1494, and the third for the latter's architect.

Flooding in the early 19th century caused serious damage to many of the city's tombs, including structural problems and the deterioration of masonry and finishes. As the problems have persisted, the Uch Monument Complex was listed in the 1998 World Monuments Watch by the World Monuments Fund, and again in 2000 and 2002. The Fund subsequently offered financial assistance for conservation from American Express. In 2018, the World Bank provided a $500 million loan to the Punjab Government to restore several historical monuments, including the Tomb of Bibi Jawindi.

== Parliamentarians ==
- 2018 (Current)
  - Syed Sami ul Hassan Gilani Member National Assembly PTI
  - Makhdoom Syed Iftikhar Hussain Gillani Member Provincial Assembly PTI
- 2013
  - Syed Ali Hassan Gillani Member National Assembly PML(N)
  - Makhdoom Syed Iftikhar Hussain Gillani Member Provincial Assembly(BNAP)
- 2008
  - Arif Aziz Sheikh Member National Assembly PPPP
  - Makhdoom Syed Iftikhar Hussain Gillani Member Provincial Assembly PML(Q)

== See also ==
- Tomb of Bibi Jawindi
- List of mausolea
