= Abuja bus crash riots =

2000 riots in Abuja, Nigeria

The Abuja bus crash riots were an outbreak of violent riots following a massive multi-bus pile up at Abuja central bus station in Nigeria.

== The bus station disaster ==
The crash occurred on 28 August 2000 at the central bus station in the city. A gravel truck transporting building supplies to a construction site suffered total brake failure on a hill above the bus station. The truck then free-wheeled in reverse down the hill, entering the bus station at a very high speed, crushing three old buses under its considerable weight. The crash caused gallons of petrol to spill from the damaged buses which were in the process of being refuelled, flooding the wreckage and parts of the crowded bus station. A flame, from an unknown source, caught the spilt fuel, and the bus station was almost instantly consumed by an immense fireball, which killed or seriously injured hundreds of people in the station or in the crushed buses, one of which was still underneath the truck.

The bus station was in the Nyanya district of the city, which is a very poor and dangerous suburb, and thus it was sometime before emergency fire-fighter services arrived and combatted the blaze, which was mostly being fought by local people as best they could. The police did not show up until much later.

At least 70 people were killed in the blast and well over 100 badly injured. The full death toll cannot be known, as there is little available census information for the area, some bodies were destroyed outright in the blaze, and others may have been removed by relatives before the recovery operation began. Others died later in hospital from their terrible injuries.

The crash was determined by police to be the result of the truck's faulty brakes, but local people expressed anger at that conclusion, claiming that the brakes were just one of a number of factors which led to the disaster. They claimed that the road approaching the bus stop was too narrow and totally unmaintained, resulting in damage to vehicles and allowing the truck to roll straight into the bus station, which had no protection against this type of incident in place such as concrete or metal defences to fend off speeding vehicles.

== The riots ==
The crash had also come after a series of high-casualty accidents, including two in the last few months that killed over 20 people and another which killed over 50. On the following day, furious at the poorly maintained roads, incompetent or corrupt officials and total lack of road security or law-enforcement by police, people in Nyanya took to the streets in protest. This protest was supposedly arranged to convince the federal government to step in and widen the dangerous road.

Events of the day are confusing, some claiming that the protests were peaceful and that what occurred was a police riot, others suggesting that there was an all out riot in progress which the police had to put down. The police report that a policeman was killed by a gunshot as they approached the protesters, whilst protesters claim the death of the policeman occurred after the riot broke out. The eventual result was that the police opened fire on the crowd, killing four and then pursuing, and beating several more people.

Riots continued in Nyanya and other areas of the city, both related to the bus disaster and in protest at police brutality and government corruption, as well as opportunistic. Parts of the city were damaged, with several cars and buildings set on fire by the mobs. Another major vehicle crash, the Ibadan tanker truck explosion three months later, also provoked riots, aimed specifically at the police.

Nigeria was at this time experiencing a period of massive social upheaval and unrest. The country was extremely poverty stricken, with huge shanty towns filled with rebellious groups, free to express some of their resentment at the government following the fall of the 30-year military dictatorship in 1999. On top of this, the country was, and still is, heavily divided along religious lines, with the North being predominantly Muslim whilst the South is strongly Christian. Strong friction between the communities was the catalyst for dozens of inter-communal riots at this period, and it is possible the protests following the bus station disaster were linked to the wider violent protest movement in Nigeria at that time.
