= Kazim Ali Pirzada =

Pakistani politician

Punjab Irrigation Department
- Incumbent
- Assumed office 6 March 2024

Member of the Provincial Assembly of the Punjab
- Incumbent
- Assumed office 24 February 2024
- Constituency: PP-245 Bahawalpur-I
- In office 15 August 2018 – 14 January 2023
- Constituency: PP-247 Bahawalpur-III
- In office 2008 – 31 May 2018

Personal details
- Born: 25 December 1970 (age 55) Bahawalpur, Punjab, Pakistan
- Party: PMLN (2008-present)
- Relations: Riaz Hussain Pirzada (uncle)

Muhammad Kazim Ali Pirzada (born 25 December 1970) is a Pakistani politician who is currently serving as Provincial Minister of the Punjab Irrigation Department in the Maryam ministry. He is a member of the Provincial Assembly of the Punjab since February 2024 under the PML-N, prior to that he served as a Punjab Assembly member from 2008 to May 2018 and August 2018 to January 2023.

== Early life and education ==
He was born on 25 December 1970 in Bahawalpur.

He received his early education in 1992 from Aitchison College. He has the degree of Bachelor of Commerce which he obtained in 1995 from Punjab College of Commerce.

== Political career ==
He was elected to the Provincial Assembly of the Punjab as an independent candidate from Constituency PP-273 (Bahawalpur-VII) in the 2008 Pakistani general election. He received 34,680 votes and defeated a candidate of Pakistan Muslim League (Q).

He was re-elected to the Provincial Assembly of the Punjab as a candidate of Pakistan Muslim League (N) (PML-N) from Constituency PP-273 (Bahawalpur-VII) in the 2013 Pakistani general election.

He was re-elected to Provincial Assembly of the Punjab as a candidate of PML-N from Constituency PP-247 (Bahawalpur-III) in the 2018 Pakistani general election.

He was officially re-elected as a PML-N candidate from PP-245 Bahawalpur-I in the 2024 Punjab provincial election. Following this he was handed the Punjab Irrigation Department portfolio in the PML-N Maryam ministry.
