= Gohad Pur =

Town in Punjab, Pakistan

Gohadpur
- Town
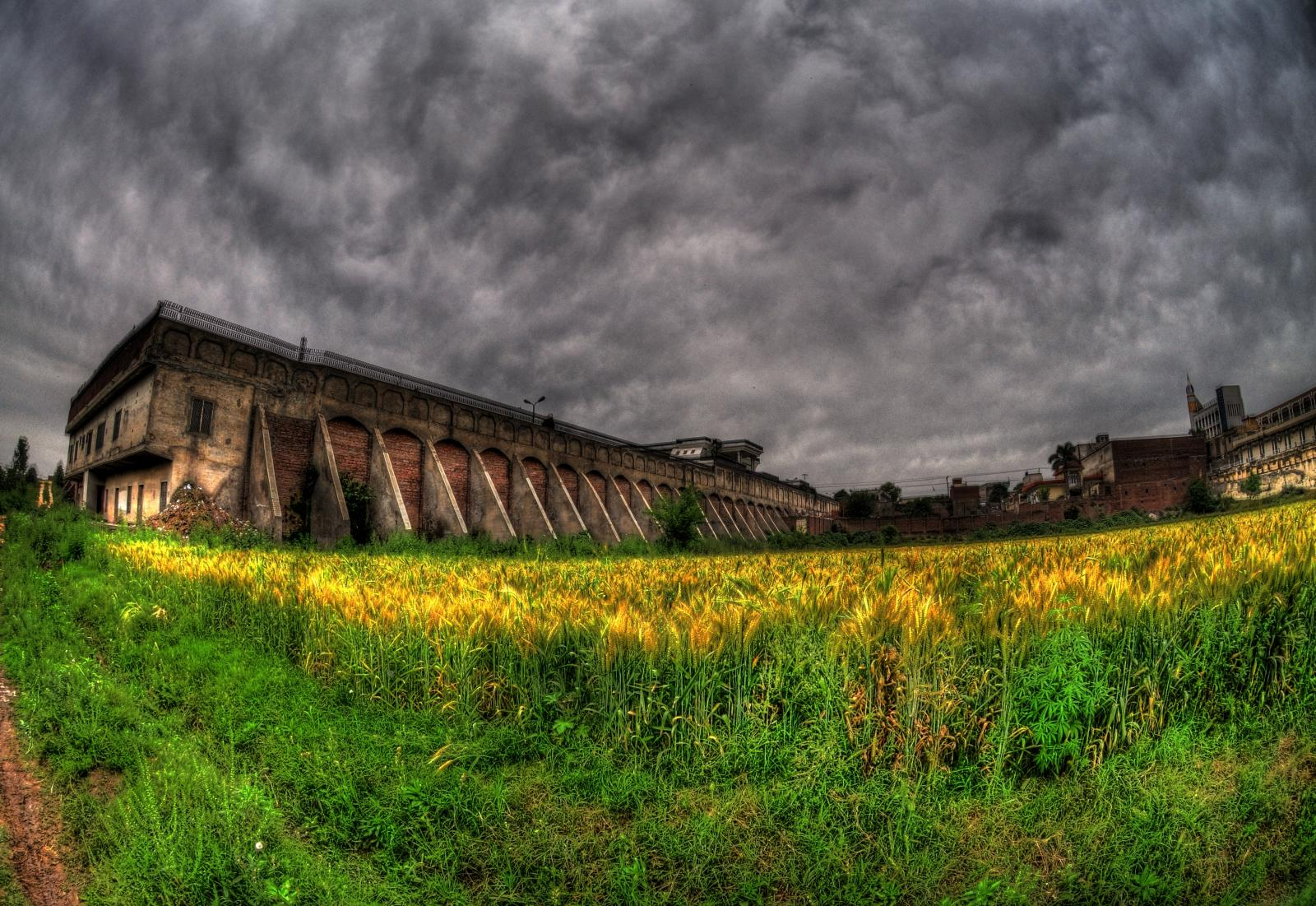
- A view of Gohadpur town

- Location in Pakistan
- Coordinates: 32°31′16″N 74°30′3″E
- Country: Pakistan
- Province: Punjab
- District: Sialkot
- Time zone: UTC+5 (PST)
- Postal code: 51310
- Calling code: 052

Gohadpur (or Gohad Pur) is a town in Sialkot District, in Punjab, Pakistan. It lies 2 km from the Sialkot general bus station. It is situated at the conjunction of Airport Road and Head Marala Road. It connects the villages like Ghansarpur, Gandaiwali, Tibbi, and Kapoorwali to the mainstream.

== Notable people ==
- Khawaja Muhammad Asif (Political Constituency)
- Firdous Ashiq Awan, Ex Minister of Broadcast & Information, Current Constituency NA-66 (Sialkot-I).
- Armaghan Subhani, member of the National Assembly of Pakistan
