= Tariq Bashir Cheema =

Pakistani politician (born 1958)

- طارق بشیر چیمہ

Federal Minister for Ministry of National Food Security & Research
- In office 19 April 2022 – 10 August 2023
- President: Arif Alvi
- Prime Minister: Shahbaz Sharif

Federal Minister for Housing and Works
- In office 18 September 2018 – 10 April 2022
- President: Arif Alvi
- Prime Minister: Imran Khan
- Preceded by: Roshan Khursheed Bharucha (caretaker)
- Succeeded by: Shehryar Khan Afridi (Minister of State)

Chairman Standing Committee on Science and Technology
- In office 2013–2018

Member of the National Assembly of Pakistan
- Incumbent
- Assumed office 29 February 2024
- Constituency: NA-165 Bahawalpur-II
- In office 13 August 2018 – 10 August 2023
- Constituency: NA-172 (Bahawalpur-III)
- In office 1 June 2013 – 31 May 2018
- Constituency: NA-187 (Bahawalpur-V)

Mayor of Bahawalpur
- In office 2005–2010
- In office 2001–2005

Provincial Minister of Punjab for Food
- In office 1993–1996

Provincial Minister of Punjab for Agriculture
- In office 1993–1996

Member of Provincial Assembly of Punjab
- In office 1993–1996
- Constituency: PP-221 (Bahawalpur-IV)

Secretary General of PML(Q)
- In office 2003 – 28 July 2022

Personal details
- Born: November 11, 1958 (age 68)
- Party: PML(Q) (2003-present)
- Other political affiliations: PPP (1980-2002)
- Relations: Tahir Bashir Cheema (brother)
- Education: Government High School Sajawal Wala

Chaudhry Tariq Bashir Cheema (Punjabi, Urdu: چوہدری طارق بشیر چیمہ) is a Pakistani politician who is serving as the Secretary General of the PML-Q since 2003. He has been a member of the National Assembly of Pakistan since February 2024 and previously served in this position from August 2018 till August 2023 and from June 2013 till May 2018. He served as the Federal Minister for National Food Security and Research.

== Education ==
He holds Bachelors degree.

== Political career ==
Cheema began his political career as an activist for the student wing of the Pakistan Peoples Party (PPP) in 1980 at the Government High School Shahi Wala.

In 2004, DAWN reported that Cheema was a suspected member of Al-Zulfiqar which, according to the claim of the then Zia regime, was a terrorist organization formed by Murtaza and Shahnawaz Bhutto to avenge the execution of their late father. He was sent to Lahore Central Jail for being accused in various cases. He was released on the demand of militants involved in the 1981 Pakistan International Airlines hijacking as a trade-off to rescue the passengers of the plane. He later moved to Afghanistan.

DAWN also reported that Cheema later returned to Pakistan for a brief time but again left Pakistan as there were a number of cases against him on terrorism charges. Cheema remained outside Pakistan until 1989 and he returned when all the cases against him were withdrawn by the then government of the PPP. After his return, he took part in Bahawalpur politics on the platform of the PPP.

He first ran for the seat of the Provincial Assembly of Punjab as a candidate of Pakistan Democratic Alliance (PDA) from Constituency PP-221 (Bahawalpur-IV) in the 1990 general elections but was unsuccessful. He received 27,904 votes and lost the seat to Chaudhry Muhammad Iqbal, a candidate of Islami Jamhoori Ittehad (IJI).

He was elected to the Provincial Assembly of Punjab as a candidate of PPP from Constituency PP-221 (Bahawalpur-IV) in the 1993 general elections. He received 45,684 votes and defeated Chaudhry Muhammad Iqbal, a candidate of Pakistan Muslim League (N) (PML-N). During his tenure as a Member of the Punjab Assembly, he served as Provincial Minister of Punjab for Food and Agriculture.

He ran for the seat of the Provincial Assembly of Punjab as a candidate of PPP from Constituency PP-221 (Bahawalpur-IV) in the 1997 general elections but was unsuccessful. He received 32,727 votes and lost the seat to Chaudhry Muhammad Iqbal, a candidate of PML-N.

In 2001, he became the District Nazim (District Mayor) of Bahawalpur after defeating the Abbasi Nawab family of Bahawalpur and was elected for a second straight time in 2005.

In 2003, he was removed from the post of divisional president of PPP on the orders of Benazir Bhutto after Cheema was found supporting the PML-Q candidate instead of PPP. In 2003, he left PPP to join Pakistan Muslim League (Q) (PML-Q) due to the growing differences between him and the PPP.

He was elected to the National Assembly of Pakistan as a candidate of PML-Q from Constituency NA-187 (Bahawalpur-V) in the 2013 Pakistani general election. He received 92,972 votes and defeated Saud Majeed. In the same election, he also ran for the seat of the National Assembly from Constituency NA-186 (Bahawalpur-IV) as a candidate of PML-Q but was unsuccessful. He received 61,403 votes and lost the seat to Riaz Hussain Pirzada. During his tenure as a Member of the National Assembly, he became the chairperson of National Assembly's Standing Committee on Science and Technology.

In 2016, Punjab Police booked Cheema along with others on the charge of violating Section 144. In 2017, he was appointed as the Secretary General of PML-Q.

He was re-elected to the National Assembly as a candidate of PML-Q from Constituency NA-172 (Bahawalpur-III) in the 2018 Pakistani general election.

On 18 August, Imran Khan formally announced his federal cabinet structure and Cheema was named as Minister for States and Frontier Regions. On 20 August 2018, he was sworn in as Federal Minister for States and Frontier Regions in the federal cabinet of Prime Minister Imran Khan. He expressed reservations over being given the ministerial portfolio of the Ministry of States and Frontier Regions. On 6 September 2018, his ministerial portfolio was changed from Federal Minister for States and Frontier Regions to Federal Minister for Housing and Works.

On 28 March 2022, he resigned from the Cabinet Ministry of Housing and Works.

In the 2024 Pakistani general election, he was re-elected as a Member of the National Assembly from NA-165 Bahawalpur-II as a candidate of PML(Q). He defeated Saud Majeed, an independent candidate, after receiving 116,571 votes. His son Walidaad Cheema also contested unsuccessfully in constituency PP-247 Bahawalpur-III from Yazman.

== Family ==
Cheema belongs to a political family from Bahawalpur. He is the elder brother of Tahir Bashir Cheema, who is an MNA from Bahawalnagar.

In July 2023, police apprehended several administrative staff members from the Islamia University of Bahawalpur. Drugs and obscene videos were found with the chief security officer, treasurer, and a transport officer. A police report also alleged that a group of teachers was involved in selling narcotics and exploiting and blackmailing female staff and students. Following this, a journalist alleged that Cheema's son, Walidad Cheema, was the cause of the scandal. Cheema subsequently held a press conference to deny these allegations.
