= PP-36 Sialkot-II =

Constituency of the Provincial Assembly of Punjab, Pakistan

- Former constituency for the Provincial Assembly of Punjab
- Region: Sialkot Tehsil (partly) and Pasrur Tehsil (partly) of Sialkot District

Former constituency
- Created: 2002
- Abolished: 2023
- Created from: PP-126 Sialkot-VI (2002–2018); PP-39 Sialkot V (2018-2023)
- Replaced by: PP-45 Sialkot-II and PP-48 Sialkot-V

PP-36 Sialkot-II (پی پی-36، سيالكوٹ-2) was a Constituency of Provincial Assembly of Punjab. It was abolished after 2023 Delimitations when Sialkot lost 1 seat.

== General elections 2018 ==
Provincial election 2018: PP-39 Sialkot-V
Party	Candidate	Votes	%	±%
Independent	Liaquat Ali	30,891	26.39	
PML(N)	Mirza Altaf Hussain	30,770	26.29	
Independent	Tanveer UI Islam	20,524	17.53	
PTI	Saif Ali Khan	18,907	16.15	
TLP	Muhammad Ashraf Saif	8,776	7.50	
PST	Rizwan Nazeer	3,067	2.62	
PPP	Malik Kamran Akbar	2,339	2.00	
Others	Others (eight candidates)	1,789	1.52	
Turnout		122,950	55.36	
Total valid votes		117,063	95.21	
Rejected ballots		5,887	4.79	
Majority		121	0.10	
Registered electors		222,086		

== General elections 2013 ==
Contesting candidates	Party affiliation	Votes polled

== General elections 2008 ==
Contesting candidates	Party affiliation	Votes polled

== See also ==
- PP-35 Sialkot-I
- PP-37 Sialkot-III
