= Bhulair Bajwa =

Pakistani village

Bhulair Bajwa is a village in Tehsil Pasrur, Sialkot District, Punjab, Pakistan. The village is located 7 km from Pasrur city.
