= Nawan Sohawa =

Village in Pakistan

Nawan Sohawa (نیا سوہاوہ) is a village located in Pasrur, Sialkot District, in Pakistan's Punjab province, with a population of 2,000.
