= Sabo Bhadiyar =

Pakistani village

Sabo Bhadiyar is a village in Pasrur Tehsil of Sialkot District, Punjab, Pakistan. Situated near Qila Kallar Wala, the village has a population of approximately 10,000-15,000 residents.
