= Mumtaz Jajja =

Pakistani politician (1948–2011)

Parliamentary Secretary for Education

Personal details
- Born: 15 June 1948 Yazman, Bahawalpur, Punjab, Pakistan
- Died: 30 September 2011 (aged 63) Lahore, Punjab, Pakistan
- Party: Pakistan Muslim League (N)

Chaudhry Mumtaz Ahmed Jajja (15 June 1948 – 30 September 2011) was a Pakistani politician affiliated with the Pakistan Muslim League (N) political party who served as a member of the National Assembly of Pakistan (MNA) from 1985 to 1988 and as an elected member of the Provincial Assembly of Punjab (MPA) following the 2008 general elections.

An agriculturist by profession and a resident of the Yazman tehsil in the Bahawalpur District of Punjab whose father migrated from Mohri Kay Jajja near Qila Kallar Wala. Mr. Jajja worked for two terms (1979–83 and 1983–87) as a member of the Bahawalpur district government in his early political career. He was a graduate of the Bahauddin Zakariya University in Multan. Before his death, he was serving as the parliamentary secretary for education in the Punjab Assembly.

He died on 30 September 2011 in the Jinnah Hospital of Lahore after being infected with dengue fever. He left behind five children.
