= Abdul Ghafoor Chaudhry =

Pakistani politician

Chaudhary Abdul Ghafoor
- چوہدری عبدلغفور
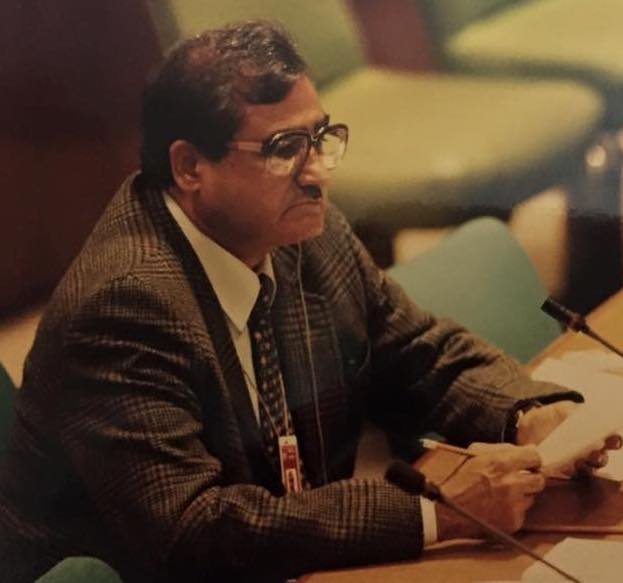
- Ghafoor at United Nations General Assembly

Minister of Law, Justice and Human Rights and Minister of Parliamentary Affairs
- In office 1991–1993

Minister of Government Reforms
- In office 2008–2013

Personal details
- Born: 1 January 1935
- Died: April 16, 2015 (aged 80)
- Resting place: Lahore
- Children: Zafar Iqbal Chaudhry Chaudhry Mazhar Iqbal Azhar Iqbal Chaudhary
- Education: Bachelor of Laws (LL.B.)
- Alma mater: University of the Punjab
- Occupation: Lawyer and Politician

Abdul Ghafoor Chaudhry (1 January 1935 – 16 April 2015) was a Pakistani politician who served as Federal Minister of Law, Justice and Human Rights (1991–1993), Federal Minister of Parliamentary Affairs (1991–1993), Federal Minister of Government Reforms (2008–2013). He also served as Provincial Minister of Law and Justice (1980–1988), Provincial Minister of Education (1982–1985), Provincial Minister of Sports (1982–1985), Provincial Minister of Agriculture (1985–1988), Provincial Minister of Agriculture (1990) and Provincial Minister of Finance (1990).

== Early life and career ==
Ghafoor was born on January 1, 1935, in Bahawalnagar. He attended a local high school and then earned his LLB degree from Punjab University.

== Political career ==
Ghafoor's political career began when he was elected unopposed as the Chairman District Council Bahawalnagar in 1980. He was in the cabinet of Governor Jilani as the Provincial Minister of Law and Justice, Provincial Minister of Education and the Provincial Minister of Sports. He represented Pakistan at the United Nations General Assembly in 1980.

He contested for two seats in the 1985 election of Pakistan. He won the M.N.A. seat of the National Assembly of Pakistan from Constituency NA-146 (Bahawalnagar-III) as an independent candidate in the 1985 Pakistan General election with 59440 votes and the M.P.A seat of the Provincial Assembly of the Punjab from Constituency PP229 with 23738 votes. He chose the M.P.A seat and was appointed as the Provincial Minister of Law and Justice as well as the Provincial Minister of Agriculture.

As part of the Islami Jamhoori Ittehad (IJI) Ghafoor was elected in the 1988 Pakistani general election. He received 58,765 votes and defeated Muhammad Afzal Sindhu. As the deputy opposition leader in the National Assembly he moved the No-Confidence Vote against Benazir Bhutto.

He was again to the National Assembly from Constituency NA-146 (Bahawalnagar-III) as (IJI) in the 1990 Pakistani general election. He received 74,872 votes and defeated Ali Akbar Mazhar Wains, a candidate of Pakistan Democratic Alliance (PDA). In the same election, he was elected to the Provincial Assembly of the Punjab as a candidate of IJI from Constituency PP-229 (Bahawalnagar-V). He received 38,866 votes and defeated Chaudhry Munir Ahmad, a candidate of PDA. In September 1991, he was inducted into the federal cabinet of Prime Minister Nawaz Sharif and was appointed as Federal Minister for Law and Justice where he continued to serve until July 1993.

Ghafoor was elected to the National Assembly from Constituency NA-146 (Bahawalnagar-III) as a candidate of PML-N in the 1997 Pakistani general election. He received 72,181 votes and defeated Ali Akbar Mazhar Wains, a candidate of PPP. He was the Chairman of the Prime Minister's Inspection team as a Federal Minister.

He was elected to the National Assembly from Constituency NA-190 (Bahawalnagar-III) as a candidate of Pakistan Peoples Party (PPP) in the 2008 Pakistani general election. He received 77,664 votes and defeated Tahir Bashir Cheema. He served as the Federal Minister of Government Reforms.
