= Malhian =

Village in Sialkot District, Punjab

Malhian is a village in Sialkot District, Punjab, Pakistan.
