= Head Rajkan =

- Location within Pakistan
- Coordinates: 29°39′50″N 70°25′20″E
- Country: Pakistan
- Province: Punjab
- District: Bahawalpur
- Time zone: UTC+5 (PST)

Head Rajkan (also Rajkan Head) is a town and union council of Yazman Tehsil, Bahawalpur District, Punjab, Pakistan. Its population is 70,000, according to the 1998 census

Agriculture

Agriculture is the backbone of Head Rajkan's economy. Farmers commonly grow: Cotton Wheat Sugarcane Maize Vegetables Mangoes and other seasonal fruits

The area's fertile land depends heavily on the canal irrigation system developed during the former Bahawalpur State.

Canal Irrigation

Head Rajkan lies in a region transformed by the Sutlej Valley Project, one of the largest irrigation projects of the former Bahawalpur State. The canal network converted large areas of semi-desert into productive farmland, significantly boosting agriculture and settlement.

Lifestyle

Most residents speak Punjabi (Riasati dialect) and Urdu. The local economy revolves around farming, livestock, small businesses, and government services. Weekly markets attract people from nearby villages.

Education & Facilities

The town has: Government and private schools Basic health facilities Mosques Local markets Banks and ATMs Agricultural supply stores

Nearby Areas                            

Some nearby places include:

Yazman Khairpur Tamewali Bahawalpur City Cholistan Desert (towards the southeast)

Historical Importance

During the rule of the Nawabs of Bahawalpur, this region was developed through extensive irrigation and land settlement projects. These initiatives helped transform the area into one of southern Punjab's productive agricultural zones

Economy and Commerce

Head Rajkan serves as a commercial center for the surrounding rural communities. Its main market attracts residents from nearby towns and villages who visit for shopping, healthcare, education, and other services. The local economy is primarily based on agriculture, retail businesses, and public services. One of the historic figure of head rajkan is Ghulam Murtaza.

Ghulam Murtaza

Ghulam Murtaza (Late) was a businessman and community member from Head Rajkan. He is recognized locally as the founder of Al Murtaza Pharmacy, which was established in 1980. Through his contribution to the healthcare sector, he became a well-known figure in the town and served the local community for many years. The pharmacy remains in operation after his death.

Al Murtaza Pharmacy

Al Murtaza Pharmacy is a retail pharmacy located at Shop No. 1, Main Bazaar, Purana Pul, Head Rajkan, Bahawalpur District, Punjab, Pakistan. It was established in 1980 by Ghulam Murtaza (Late) and is regarded by local residents as one of the oldest pharmacies in Head Rajkan. The pharmacy provides prescription medicines, over-the-counter medications, and healthcare products, serving residents of Head Rajkan as well as nearby villages and surrounding towns. Due to its long history and central location in the town's main commercial area, it has become a well-known healthcare establishment in the region.

Education

Head Rajkan has a number of government and private educational institutions serving students from the town and nearby villages.

Notable institutions include:

Government schools for boys and girls.

PEF-supported schools. Allama Iqbal School (Boys), managed by Nazir Ahmad Allama Iqbal School (Girls), managed by Iqbal Murtaza.

Priavtly owned school

Umm Al-Qura School, managed by Dr. Abdul Rouf.

Al Suffah School, managed by Naeem.

Al Noor College, managed by Asghar Hussain.

Healthcare

Healthcare services in Head Rajkan include:

Government health facilities, including the Maryam Nawaz Health Center.
Several private medical clinics.
Local pharmacies serving the town and surrounding villages.

Sports

Cricket is the most popular sport in Head Rajkan. The town has a local cricket ground that hosts matches involving teams from nearby villages and towns. The ground is managed by Faisal Sheraz Cheema, who is widely known locally as Lala Faisal.

Government Services

Public services available in Head Rajkan include:

NADRA Registration Office
Government healthcare facilities
Educational institutions
Local administrative offices

Residential Areas

One of the best-known residential neighborhoods is Madina Colony, which is among the established housing areas of the town.

Nearby Villages and Settlements

Head Rajkan is surrounded by several villages and agricultural settlements, including:

Chak 5 DNB
Chak 6 DNB
Chak 13 DNB
Chak 17 DNB
Chak 34 DNB
Chak 35 DNB
Chak 36 DNB
Chak 39 DNB
Khutri Bangla
Mithre Bangla

These settlements depend on Head Rajkan for commerce, education, healthcare, and administrative services.

Notable Religious Scholars

Head Rajkan has produced several respected Islamic scholars, including:

Allama Zubair Noor Rizvi Javed Iqbal Goraya (Late)

They are recognized locally for their contributions to Islamic education and religious scholarship.

Local Importance

Head Rajkan functions as an important service and trading center within the region. Its central market, educational institutions, healthcare facilities, and government offices make it a focal point for residents of the surrounding villages.
