= NA-70 Sialkot-I =

Constituency of the National Assembly of Pakistan

- Constituency for the National Assembly of Pakistan
- Region: Sialkot Tehsil (except Sialkot City) and Daska Tehsil (partly) of Sialkot District
- Electorate: 555,752

Current constituency
- Party: Pakistan Muslim League (N)
- Member: Armaghan Subhani
- Created from: NA-111 Sialkot-II

NA-70 Sialkot-I (این اے-70، سيالکوٹ-1) is a constituency for the National Assembly of Pakistan. It mainly comprises the non-urban portion of Sialkot Tehsil.

== Members of Parliament ==
=== 2002–2018: NA-111 Sialkot-II ===
Election	Member	Party
2002	Chaudhry Amir Hussain	PML (Q)
2008	Firdous Ashiq Awan	PPP
2013	Armaghan Subhani	PML (N)

=== 2018–2023: NA-72 Sialkot-I ===
Election	Member	Party
2018	Armaghan Subhani	PML (N)

=== 2024–present: NA-70 Sialkot-I ===
Election	Member	Party
2024	Armaghan Subhani	PML (N)

== Election 2002 ==
General elections were held on 10 October 2002. Chaudhry Amir Hussain of PML-Q won by 52,378 votes.

General election 2002: NA-111 Sialkot-II
Party	Candidate	Votes	%	±%
PML(Q)	Ch. Amir Hussain	52,378	37.98	
PML(N)	Idrees Ahmed Bajwa	50,761	36.81	
PPP	Tariq Yousaf Rajput	25,329	18.37	
PAT	Muhammad Yaqub	9,317	6.76	
Independent	Akhtar Javed Pirzada	128	0.08	
Turnout		144,367	44.91	
Total valid votes		137,913	95.53	
Rejected ballots		6,454	4.47	
Majority		1,617	1.17	
Registered electors		321,453		

== Election 2008 ==
Dr. Firdos Ashiq Awan, the PPP candidate, won the seat in 2008, and went on to hold several cabinet portfolios during the PPP government.

General election 2008: NA-111 Sialkot-II
Party	Candidate	Votes	%	±%
PPP	Firdous Ashiq Awan	78,925	48.19	
PML(Q)	Ch. Amir Hussain	46,372	28.31	
PML(N)	Idrees Ahmed Bajwa	38,193	23.32	
Independent	Ch. Manzoor Hussain	293	0.18	
Turnout		171,319	55.72	
Total valid votes		163,783	95.60	
Rejected ballots		7,536	4.40	
Majority		32,553	19.88	
Registered electors		307,465		
PPP gain from PML(Q)				

General elections were held on 18 February 2008. Firdous Ashiq Awan of PPP won by 78,925 votes. On the other hand, Ch.Amir Hussain of Pakistan Muslim League secured 46372

== Election 2013 ==
General elections were held on 11 May 2013. Armaghan Subhani of PML-N won by 137,474 votes and became the member of National Assembly.

General election 2013: NA-111 Sialkot-II
Party	Candidate	Votes	%	±%
PML(N)	Ch. Armaghan Subhani	137,474	61.84	
PPP	Firdous Ashiq Awan	51,046	22.96	
PTI	Muhammad Ajmal Cheema	31,153	14.01	
Others	Others (nine candidates)	2,625	1.19	
Turnout		227,806	56.95	
Total valid votes		222,298	97.58	
Rejected ballots		5,508	2.42	
Majority		86,427	38.88	
Registered electors		399,981		
PML(N) gain from PPP				

== Election 2018 ==
General elections were held on 25 July 2018.

General election 2018: NA-72 Sialkot-I
Party	Candidate	Votes	%	±%
PML(N)	Armaghan Subhani	129,041	49.65	
PTI	Firdous Ashiq Awan	91,393	35.16	
Others	Others (eight candidates)	32,473	12.49	
Turnout		259,922	58.11	
Rejected ballots		7,015	2.70	
Majority		37,648	14.49	
Registered electors		447,309		
PML(N) hold		Swing	N/A	

== Election 2024 ==
General elections were held on 8 February 2024. Armaghan Subhani won the election with 123,495 votes.

General election 2024: NA-70 Sialkot-I
Party	Candidate	Votes	%	±%
PML(N)	Armaghan Subhani	123,495	43.28	▼6.37
PTI	Hafiz Hamid Raza (Note: Filed nomination papers as PTI candidate but ECP allowed him to run as an Independent)	112,145	39.30	▲4.14
TLP	Muhammad Shahid	23,929	8.39	▲0.58
IPP	Firdous Ashiq Awan	10,658	3.74	N/A
Others	Others (twenty candidates)	15,112	5.30	
Turnout		292,428	52.62	▼5.49
Total valid votes		285,339	97.58	
Rejected ballots		7,089	2.42	
Majority		11,350	3.98	▼10.51
Registered electors		555,752		
PML(N) hold				

== See also ==
- NA-69 Mandi Bahauddin-II
- NA-71 Sialkot-II
