= Jajjay Sahian =

Village in Pakistan

Jajjay Sahian is a village in Sialkot District, in the Punjab province of Pakistan.
