= NA-165 Bahawalpur-II =

Constituency of the National Assembly of Pakistan

- Constituency for the National Assembly of Pakistan
- Region: Bahawalpur Saddar Tehsil (partly) and Yazman Tehsil of Bahawalpur District
- Electorate: 483,582

Current constituency
- Party: Pakistan Muslim League (Q)
- Member: Tariq Bashir Cheema
- Created from: NA-187 Bahawalpur-V

NA-165 Bahawalpur-II (این اے-165، بہاولپور-2) is a constituency for the National Assembly of Pakistan.

== Members of Parliament ==
=== 2018–2023: NA-172 Bahawalpur-III ===
Election	Member	Party
2018	Tariq Bashir Cheema	PML(Q)

=== 2024–present: NA-165 Bahawalpur-II ===
Election	Member	Party
2024	Tariq Bashir Cheema	PML(Q)

== Election 2002 ==
General elections were held on 10 October 2002. Aitzaz Ahsan of PPP won by 73,660 votes.

General election 2002: NA-187 Bahawalpur-V
Party	Candidate	Votes	%	±%
PPP	Aitazaz Ahsan	73,660	56.16	
PML(N)	Ch. Khalid Mehmood Jajja	37,775	28.80	
PML(Q)	Azhar Mehmood	17,912	13.66	
Others	Others (two candidates)	1,817	1.38	
Turnout		133,596	50.49	
Total valid votes		131,164	98.18	
Rejected ballots		2,432	1.82	
Majority		35,885	27.36	
Registered electors		264,580		

== By-election 2003 ==
By-election 2003: NA-187 Bahawalpur-V
Party	Candidate	Votes	%	±%
Independent	Syed Tasneem Nawaz Gardezi	63,759	56.15	
Independent	Ch. Saud Majeed	42,916	37.79	
MMA	Maulana M. Shahbaz Bajwa	4,457	3.93	
PPP	Barrister Taj M. Khan Langah	1,644	1.45	
Others	Others (two candidates)	776	0.68	
Turnout		114,435	43.25	
Total valid votes		113,552	99.23	
Rejected ballots		883	0.77	
Majority		20,843	18.63	
Registered electors		264,580		

== Election 2008 ==
General elections were held on 18 February 2008. Chaudhry Saud Majeed of PML-N won by 77,860 votes.

General election 2008: NA-187 Bahawalpur-V
Party	Candidate	Votes	%	±%
PML(N)	Ch. Saud Majeed	77,860	53.79	
PML(Q)	Ch. Pervaiz Elahi	60,079	41.51	
Others	Others (two candidates)	6,807	4.70	
Turnout		148,632	46.80	
Total valid votes		144,746	97.39	
Rejected ballots		3,866	2.61	
Majority		17,781	12.28	
Registered electors		317,589		
PML(N) gain from PPP				

== Election 2013 ==
General elections were held on 11 May 2013. Ch.Tariq Bashir Cheema of PML-Q won by 92,972 votes and became the member of National Assembly.

General election 2013: NA-187 Bahawalpur-V
Party	Candidate	Votes	%	±%
PML(Q)	Ch. Tariq Bashir Cheema	92,972	50.40	
PML(N)	Ch. Saud Majeed	88,872	48.18	
Others	Others (nine candidates)	2,612	1.42	
Turnout		190,532	67.36	
Total valid votes		184,456	96.81	
Rejected ballots		6,076	3.19	
Majority		4,100	2.22	
Registered electors		282,844		
PML(Q) gain from PML(N)				

== Election 2018 ==
General elections were held on 25 July 2018.

General election 2018: NA-172 Bahawalpur-III
Party	Candidate	Votes	%	±%
PML(Q)	Tariq Bashir Cheema	106,383	47.35	
PML(N)	Saud Majeed	101,971	45.38	
Others	Others (four candidates)	16,327	7.27	
Turnout		229,275	64.08	
Total valid votes		224,681	98.00	
Rejected ballots		4,594	2.00	
Majority		4,412	1.96	
Registered electors		357,821		
PML(Q) hold		Swing	N/A	

== Election 2024 ==
General elections were held on 8 February 2024. Tariq Bashir Cheema won the election with 116,571 votes.

General election 2024: NA-165 Bahawalpur-II
Party	Candidate	Votes	%	±%
PML(Q)	Tariq Bashir Cheema	116,571	38.93	▼8.42
Independent	Saud Majeed	105,758	35.32	
PTI	Basharat Ali (Note: Filed nomination papers as PTI candidate but ECP allowed him to run as an Independent)	50,349	16.81	
Others	Others (twelve candidates)	26,784	8.94	
Turnout		308,297	63.75	▼0.33
Total valid votes		299,462	97.13	
Rejected ballots		8,835	2.87	
Majority		10,813	3.61	▲1.65
Registered electors		483,582		
PML(Q) hold		Swing	N/A	

== See also ==
- NA-164 Bahawalpur-I
- NA-166 Bahawalpur-III
