= Tarigri =

Pakistani village

Coordinates: 32.3529°N 74.4836°E

Tarigri is a village in Sialkot District, Punjab, Pakistan. It is located in the rural area of the district.
