= Tariq Subhani =

Pakistani politician

Chairman of the Punjab Land Records Authority
- Incumbent
- Assumed office 5 September 2024

Member of the Provincial Assembly of Punjab
- Incumbent
- Assumed office 24 February 2024
- Constituency: PP-45 Sialkot-II
- In office 29 May 2013 – 31 May 2018
- Constituency: PP-125 Sialkot-V

Personal details
- Born: 1 December 1971 (age 54) Sialkot, Punjab, Pakistan
- Party: PMLN (2013-present)
- Other political affiliations: PML(Q) (2002-2013); PMLN (1997-2001); PML-J (1993-1997)
- Parent: Akhtar Ali Vario (father)
- Relatives: Armaghan Subhani (cousin); Choudhary Khush Akhtar Subhani (brother)

Chaudhry Tariq Subhani (Urdu: طارق سبحا نی) is a Pakistani politician from Sialkot who was a Member of the Provincial Assembly of the Punjab, from May 2013 to May 2018. Subhani was born in a prominent Vario family of Gujjars. He is the son of Akhtar Ali Vario a prominent politician and landlord of Sialkot who was elected as Member National Assembly & Member Provincial Assembly of Punjab several times.

== Early life and education ==
He was born on 1 December 1971 in Sialkot.

He has a degree of the Bachelor of Business Administration which he obtained from William Paterson University in 1997. He has a Diploma from Nutley High School.

He holds American citizenship.

== Political career ==
He was elected to the Provincial Assembly of the Punjab as a candidate of Pakistan Muslim League (Nawaz) from Constituency PP-125 (Sialkot-V) in the 2013 Pakistani general election. In 2019, he was made the President of PMLN Sialkot chapter and continues to serve in this office.

He was re-elected to the Provincial Assembly of the Punjab as a candidate of Pakistan Muslim League (N) from constituency PP-45 Sialkot-II in the 2024 Pakistani general election.

== By-elections 2021 ==
He was given ticket for the Provincial Assembly of the Punjab seat of PP-38 as the candidate of Pakistan Muslim League (N). He received 56,353 votes and his opponent Ahsan Saleem Baryar and candidate of Pakistan Tehreek-e-Insaf received 62,657 votes.
