= PP-45 Sialkot-II =

Constituency of the Punjabi Provincial Legislature, Pakistan

- Constituency for the Provincial Assembly of Punjab
- Region: Sialkot Tehsil (partly) and Daska Tehsil (partly) of Sialkot District

Current constituency
- Created from: PP-125 Sialkot-VI (2002–2018); PP-38 Sialkot-IV and PP-39 Sialkot-V (partly) (2018-2023)

PP-45 Sialkot-II (پی پی-45، سيالكوٹ-2) is a Constituency of Provincial Assembly of Punjab.

== General elections 2024 ==
Provincial election 2024: PP-45 Sialkot-II
Party	Candidate	Votes	%	±%
PML(N)	Tariq Subhani	63,467	45.33	
Independent	Umer Javed Ghuman (Note: Filed nomination papers as PTI candidate but ECP allowed him to run as an Independent)	52,312	37.36	
TLP	Hafiz Muhammad Kamran Zafar	11,843	8.46	
IPP	Tahir Mehmood Hundli	5,792	4.14	
Others	Others (seventeen candidates)	7,597	4.71	
Turnout		145,106	53.55	
Total valid votes		141,011	97.18	
Rejected ballots		4,095	2.82	
Majority		11,155	7.97	
Registered electors		270,957		
hold				

== General elections 2018 ==
Provincial election 2018: PP-38 Sialkot-IV
Party	Candidate	Votes	%	±%
PML(N)	Chaudhary Khush Akhter Subhani	57,636	47.69	
PTI	Saeed Ahmad Bhalli	40,575	33.57	
Independent	Tahir Mehmood Hundli	12,485	10.33	
TLP	Muhammad Ishaq	7,670	6.35	
Independent	Muhammad Aneeq Subhani	1,087	0.90	
Others	Others (three candidates)	1,403	1.16	
Turnout		123,800	59.39	
Total valid votes		120,856	97.62	
Rejected ballots		2,944	2.38	
Majority		17,061	14.12	
Registered electors		208,459		

== General elections 2013 ==
Provincial election 2013: PP-125 Sialkot-VI
Party	Candidate	Votes	%	±%
PML(N)	Ch. Tariq Subhani	59,706	63.48	
PPP	Tahir Mehmood Hundali	20,030	21.30	
PTI	Ch. Shahnawaz	10,037	10.67	
Others	Others (fourteen candidates)	4,285	4.56	
Turnout		96,620	59.41	
Total valid votes		94,058	97.35	
Rejected ballots		2,562	2.65	
Majority		39,676	42.18	
Registered electors		162,636		

== General elections 2008 ==
Provincial election 2008: PP-125 Sialkot-VI
Party	Candidate	Votes	%	±%
PPP	Ch. Tahir Mehmood Hundli	27,721	38.43	
PML(Q)	Ch. Khush Akhtar Subhani	26,360	36.54	
PML(N)	Ch. Mohammad Rafi	17,729	24.58	
Independent	Ch. Ghulam Mustafa.	231	0.32	
Independent	Ch.Tariq Subhani	65	0.09	
Independent	Mohammad Haq Nawaz Bhalli	33	0.05	
Turnout		74,633	59.19	
Total valid votes		72,139	96.66	
Rejected ballots		2,494	3.34	
Majority		1,361	1.89	
Registered electors		126,100		

== See also ==
- PP-44 Sialkot-I
- PP-46 Sialkot-III
