= Saud Majeed =

Pakistani politician

Member of the Senate of Pakistan
- In office May 2015 – March 2021

Member of the National Assembly of Pakistan
- In office 2008–2013
- Constituency: NA-187 (Bahawalpur-V)

Personal details
- Party: PMLN

Chaudhry Saud Majeed (Punjabi, Urdu: سعود مجید) is a Pakistani politician who remained a member of Senate of Pakistan from 2015 to 2021. Previously he had been a Member of the National Assembly of Pakistan from 2008 to 2013. He is the youngest son of late Chaudhry Abdul Majeed Arain (first mayor of Bahawalpur and former Member of Provincial Assembly). He attended the prestigious Sadiq Public School in Bahawalpur, Pakistan, and obtained his Master's of Business Administration degree from the University of Cardiff in Wales, UK.

== Political career ==
He ran for the seat of the Provincial Assembly of the Punjab as a candidate of Pakistan Muslim League (J) from Constituency PP-276 (Bahawalpur-X) in the 2002 Pakistani general election but was unsuccessful. He received 11,136 votes and lost the seat to Muhammad Afzal, a candidate of Pakistan Peoples Party (PPP).

He was elected to the National Assembly of Pakistan as a candidate for Pakistan Muslim League (N) (PML-N) for the Constituency NA-187 (Bahawalpur-V) in the 2008 Pakistani general election. He received 77,860 votes and defeated Pervaiz Elahi. In the same election, he ran for the seat of the Provincial Assembly of the Punjab from Constituency PP-276 (Bahawalpur-X) as a candidate of PML-N but was unsuccessful. He received 29,040 votes and lost the seat to Muhammad Afzal, a candidate of Pakistan Muslim League (Q) (PML-Q).

He ran for the seat of the National Assembly as a candidate for PML-N for NA-187 (Bahawalpur-V) in the 2013 Pakistani general election but was unsuccessful. He received 88,872 votes and lost the seat to Tariq Bashir Cheema. In the same election, he ran for the seat of the Provincial Assembly of the Punjab from Constituency PP-276 (Bahawalpur-X) as an independent candidate but was unsuccessful. He received 166 votes and lost the seat to Muhammad Afzal, a candidate of PML-Q.

He was elected to the Senate of Pakistan as candidate of PML-N in May 2015.
