= Khan Jajja =

Coordinates: 32°07′N 74°35′E

Khan Jajja is a village in Sialkot Tehsil, Sialkot District, Punjab, Pakistan.

Jajja (जज्ज) Jaja (जज) is a Muslim Jat clan found in Pakistan. Jaji (जजी) clan is also found in Afghanistan.[1]

== Genealogy of Jajja ==
H.A. Rose[2] provides us the following genealogy as given by the Mirasi at Pandndwala in the Chiniot Tahsil of the Jhang District : —

Punwar. → Udadip. → Jagdeo.→ Karral.→ Gaidal.→ Sulangi. → Vimian. → Butta.→ Aira.→ Jajja.→ Jaisal.→ Ranu. → Khiva. → Kharral.→ Buddh.→ Gaddan.→ Deore.→ Udrath.→ Sareg.→ Jagsin. → Kaulra. → Vasu. + Visa.

== History ==
Jajjah (जज्जाह) (and) Jathol (जथोल ), a tribe of Jats, found in Sialkot. They claim Solar Rajput origin and say that their ancestor, Jam, migrated from Multan. His two sons Jaj and Jathol founded villages in the Pasrur tahsil of Sialkot. Their mirasis are Posla, their Brahmans Badhar and their nais Khokhar by got. According to the Customary Law of Sialkot the Jajjah is distinct from the Jathaul.
