= Saukin Wind =

Human settlement in Pakistan

Saukin Wind (Arabic: سوکن ونڈ), also written Saukanwind, Saukinwind and Sokanwind, is a village in Pasrur Tehsil, Sialkot District, Punjab, Pakistan. It is located on the Pasrur-Qila Kallar Wala road. Sokanwind is 200 years old village. The village is about 100 km (62 mi) northeast of Lahore, the capital of Punjab province.
