= Chaudhry Muhammad Akhlaq =

Pakistani politician

Provincial Minister of Punjab for Special Education
- In office 13 September 2018 – 10 April 2022

Member of the Provincial Assembly of the Punjab
- In office 15 August 2018 – 14 January 2023
- Constituency: PP-36 Sialkot-II

Personal details
- Born: 1 May 1956 (age 70) Sialkot, Punjab, Pakistan
- Party: IPP (2023-present)
- Other political affiliations: PTI (2018-2023)

Chaudhry Muhammad Akhlaq is a Pakistani politician who was the Provincial Minister of Punjab for Special Education, in office from 13 September 2018 till April 2022. He had been a member of the Provincial Assembly of the Punjab from August 2018 till January 2023.

== Early life and education ==
He was born on 1 May 1956 in Sialkot, Pakistan.

He holds a degree of Bachelor of Commerce.

He has five children.

== Political career ==
He was elected to the Provincial Assembly of the Punjab as a candidate of Pakistan Muslim League (N) (PML-N) from PP-122 (Sialkot-II) in the 2008 Punjab provincial election. He received 33,959 votes and defeated Raja Amer Khan, a candidate of Pakistan Peoples Party (PPP). In September 2012, the Supreme Court of Pakistan disqualified him as member of the Provincial Assembly.

He was re-elected to the Provincial Assembly of the Punjab as a candidate of the Pakistan Tehreek-e-Insaf (PTI) from PP-36 (Sialkot-II) in the 2018 Punjab provincial election.

On 12 September 2018, he was inducted into the cabinet of Chief Minister Sardar Usman Buzdar. On 13 September 2018, he was appointed Provincial Minister of Punjab for Special Education.

He ran for a seat in the Provincial Assembly from PP-37 Sialkot-III as a candidate of the IPP in the 2024 Punjab provincial election.

== Book ==
- Shahbāz Sharīf siyāsat aur ʻamal [Shahbaz Sharif: Politics and Actions], Jumhoori Publications, 2011, 294 p.
