= PP-44 Sialkot-I =

Constituency of the Punjabi Provincial Legislature, Pakistan

- Constituency for the Provincial Assembly of Punjab
- Region: Sialkot Tehsil (partly) including Kotli Loharan town of Sialkot District

Current constituency
- Created from: PP-121 Sialkot-I (2002–2018); PP-35 Sialkot-I (2018-2023)

PP-44 Sialkot-I (پی پی-44، سيالكوٹ-1) is a Constituency of Provincial Assembly of Punjab.

== General elections 2024 ==
Provincial election 2024: PP-44 Sialkot-I
Party	Candidate	Votes	%	±%
PML(N)	Arif Iqbal	47,137	33.18	
Independent	Saeed Ahmad Bhalli (Note: Filed nomination papers as PTI candidate but ECP allowed him to run as an Independent)	41,250	29.04	
Independent	Malik Ziafat Ali Awan	19,835	13.96	
TLP	Sajawal Hussain	18,473	13.00	
JI	Fasih UI Islam	3,594	2.53	
Independent	Mirza Dilawar Baig	3,454	2.43	
Independent	Habib Ullah	2,288	1.61	
Others	Others (twenty candidates)	6,760	4.25	
Turnout		147,031	51.63	
Total valid votes		142,791	97.12	
Rejected ballots		4,240	2.88	
Majority		5,887	4.14	
Registered electors		284,795		
hold				

== General elections 2018 ==
Provincial election 2018: PP-35 Sialkot-I
Party	Candidate	Votes	%	±%
PML(N)	Arif Iqbal	46,370	37.98	
PTI	Mirza Dilawar Baig	33,887	27.76	
Independent	Malik Ziafat Ali Awan	20,482	16.78	
TLP	Zahid Saddique	13,531	11.08	
PPP	Chauhdary Shoukat Ali	3,785	3.10	
Independent	Malik Abid Ali	1,298	1.06	
AAT	Ahtisham Gull	1,073	0.88	
Others	Others (seven candidates)	1,656	1.37	
Turnout		124,997	57.08	
Total valid votes		122,082	97.67	
Rejected ballots		2,915	2.33	
Majority		12,483	10.22	
Registered electors		218,989		

== General elections 2013 ==
Provincial election 2013: PP-121 Sialkot-I
Party	Candidate	Votes	%	±%
PML(N)	Rana Muhmamad Iqbal Hamah	65,642	56.36	
PPP	Mian Abid Javed	24,910	21.39	
PTI	Muhammad Asif Raza	19,922	17.10	
MWM	Syed Sakhawat Hussain	1,555	1.34	
JI	Hafiz Muhammad Tahir Aslam	1,129	0.97	
Others	Others (sixteen candidates)	4,322	3.71	
Turnout		119,395	57.58	
Total valid votes		116,480	97.56	
Rejected ballots		2,915	2.44	
Majority		40,732	34.97	
Registered electors		207,346		

== General elections 2008 ==
Provincial election 2008: PP-121 Sialkot-I
Party	Candidate	Votes	%	±%
PML(N)	Rana Tariq Mehmood	49,392	54.82	
PML(Q)	Mohammad Ajmal Cheema	26,916	29.88	
PPP	Major (R) Tariq Yousaf Rajput	12,342	13.70	
Independent	Qamar Elahi	998	1.11	
MMA	Noor Ahmed.	401	0.45	
Independent	Mohammad Haq Nawaz Bhalli	24	0.03	
Independent	Ch. Muhammad Saboor Kasana	20	0.02	
Turnout		94,965	58.21	
Total valid votes		90,093	94.87	
Rejected ballots		4,872	5.13	
Majority		22,476	24.94	
Registered electors		163,145		

== See also ==
- PP-43 Mandi Bahauddin-IV
- PP-45 Sialkot-II
