= Akhtar Ali Vario =

Pakistani Politician

Ch Akhtar Ali Vario

Member of the National Assembly of Pakistan
- In office 1993–1996

Chairman Standing Committee on Narcotics
- In office 1993–1996

Member of Provincial Assembly of the Punjab
- In office 1985–1993

Provincial Minister For Excise
- In office 1990–1993

Provincial Minister For Communications & Works
- In office 1988–1990

Special Assistant to the Chief Minister of Punjab (Pakistan)
- In office 1985–1988

Chairman District Council Sialkot
- In office 1979–1987

Personal details
- Born: 15 March 1937 Sialkot, Punjab, Pakistan
- Died: 16 June 2008 (aged 71) Sialkot, Punjab,
- Party: PML(Q) (2002-2008)
- Other political affiliations: PMLN (1997-2001); PML-J (1993-1997); IJI (1985-1993)
- Children: Choudhary Khush Akhtar Subhani; Tariq Subhani
- Relatives: Armaghan Subhani (nephew)

Chaudhry Akhtar Ali Vario (Urdu: چوہدری اختر علی آف وریو) was a Pakistani politician and head of the Vario family of Sialkot District, Punjab province. He was one of the founding members of the Pakistan Muslim League (Junejo) and was elected as a Member of the National Assembly of Pakistan, and Member of the Provincial Assembly of Punjab several times. He was awarded the title of "King Maker" by Benazir Bhutto.

== Early life ==
Vario was born in Gurdaspur district in 1937 on March 15, in a Punjabi family of Muslim Gujjars. His father Chaudhry Ghulam Ahmed Ali Zaildar was a prominent personality of his area who migrated to Pakistan with his family in 1947.

== Political career ==
Vario began his political career in local governance, serving as the Director of the Central Co-operative Bank from 1973 to 1975. In the 1979 Local Government Elections, he was elected as the Chairman of the District Council Sialkot and was re-elected to the same office in 1983.

In the 1985 non-party General Elections, he was elected as a Member of the Provincial Assembly (MPA) from PP-143 (Sialkot) and was appointed as the Special Assistant to the Chief Minister.

He was re-elected in 1988 as a representative of the Islami Jamhoori Ittehad from PP-104 (Sialkot) and was given the portfolio of Minister for Communication and Works by Chief Minister Nawaz Sharif. In these elections, his brother Chaudhry Abdul Sattar Vario won the National Assembly seat of NA-88 after Sharif vacated the seat in favor of his provincial constituency.

In the 1990 elections, he contested from two constituencies, PP-103 and PP-106 (Sialkot), and won both. He chose to retain the PP-106 seat. In the same polls, his brother again won the National Assembly seat of NA-88, while his son Chaudhary Khush Akhtar Subhani won the PP-104 seat, becoming an MPA for the first time and later serving as Chairman of the Standing Committee on Food.

In the 1993 elections, Vario contested from the Pakistan Muslim League Junejo for the National Assembly seat NA-86 and became a Member of the National Assembly (MNA) by defeating Ch. Amir Hussain, a former Speaker of the National Assembly. He was appointed as the Chairman of the Standing Committee on Narcotics. In the same election, he also contested for the provincial seat PP-106, defeating Syed Ifthikar ul Hassan, but chose to retain his National Assembly seat.

His brother, Chaudhry Abdul Sattar Vario, won his third term as MNA from NA-88 and became the Federal Minister for Industries. In the same elections, his son Ch. Khush Akhtar Subhani became MPA from PP-104 and was awarded the ministries of Population Welfare, Prisons, Housing & Physical Planning, and Environmental Planning in Wattoo’s cabinet.

He later joined the PML-Q and played an important role in the party’s success in the 2001 local body elections, in which their candidates secured 61 Union Council Nazim seats out of a possible 124 in Sialkot district.

=== Imprisonment ===
He was imprisoned during 2002–2003 by the National Accountability Bureau, who accused him of corruption charges, but was acquitted by Lahore High Court, which deemed the case against him not to be strong enough.

== Death ==
Ch. Akhtar Ali died at the age of 71, in Services Institute of Medical Sciences on 16 June 2008 after being in a coma for five days. He was suffered from diabetes and heart disease. He was buried on 17 June in village of Vario Sialkot.
