= Kakay Wali =

Kakay Wali is a village in Sialkot District in Punjab province of Pakistan.
