= Pasrur =

Pasrur پسرُور
- City
- Location within Punjab, Pakistan Location within Pakistan
- Coordinates: 32°15′49″N 74°39′46″E
- Country: Pakistan
- Province: Punjab
- Division: Gujranwala
- District: Sialkot
- Founder: Chaudhry Matika Bajwa

Government
  - Type: Municipal Committee
  - Chief Officer: Vacant
  - Municipal Officer: Vacant
  - Assistant Commissioner: Sana Sharafat
  - MNA: Ali Zahid
- Elevation: 238 m (781 ft)

Population (2023)
  - City: 102,717
  - Rank: 123rd in Pakistan
- Time zone: UTC+5 (PST)
- Calling code: 052
- Number of wards: 26

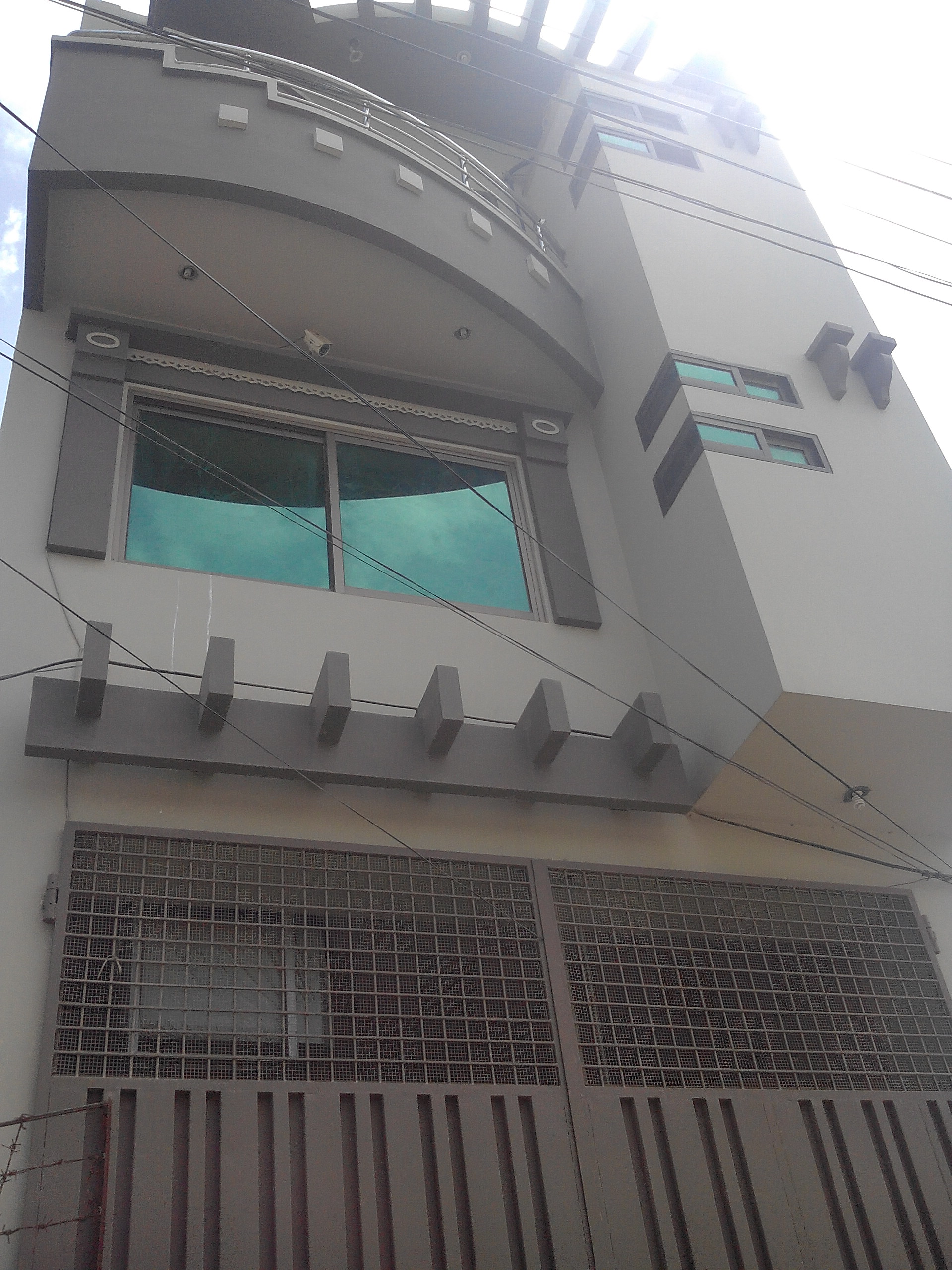

Pasrur (Punjabi and Urdu: پسرُور) is a historical city of Sialkot District in the Punjab province of Pakistan. It is the capital of Pasrur Tehsil and is administratively subdivided into 26 wards of the municipal committee Pasrur. Pasrur is connected to Narowal, Sialkot, Daska and Gujranwala via multiple roads. The Pasrur railway station has a railway track also passing through the city which connects Parsrur and Sialkot to Lahore via Narowal Junction.

Other important places in Pasrur Tehsil are Badyana, Chawinda, Chaubara, Kingra, Sabz Peer, Kala Pahar, Chichharwali and Dhodha.

It was founded during the reign of Mughal emperor Babur by a Jatt called Chaudhry Matika Bajwa. Nearby are the remains of a bridge built by Shah Daula.

== British era ==
During British rule, Pasrur became the headquarters of Pasrur Tehsil. The town (which is 18 miles south of the district capital Sialkot) lies on the Sialkot to Amritsar road. The population in 1901 was 8,335. The trade through Pasrur declined, partly through the opening of the North-Western Railway and partly on account of the octroi duties which diverted trade to the neighboring village of Saukin Wind. Hand-printed cotton stuff were the only manufacture of importance.

The municipality was created in 1867. The income during the ten years ending 1902-3 averaged Rs. 7,900, and the expenditure Rs. 7,800. The income in 1903-4 was Rs. 8,000, chiefly from octroi; and the expenditure was Rs. 6,900. The town had an Anglo-vernacular high school maintained by the district board, and a government dispensary.

== Demographics ==
Historical population
Year	Pop.	±%
1951	9,403	—
1961	10,836	+15.2%
1972	19,647	+81.3%
1981	26,087	+32.8%
1998	45,747	+75.4%
2017	82,457	+80.2%
2023	102,717	+24.6%

According to the 2023 census Pasrur had a population of 102,717.

Languages

Languages of Pasrur MC (2023 Census)
1. Punjabi (94.0%)
2. Urdu (5.10%)
3. Others (0.90%)

== See also ==
- List of cities in Pakistan by population
- List of cities in Punjab, Pakistan by population
