= Tahir Bashir Cheema =

Pakistani politician (born 1960)

- طاہر بشیر چیمہ

Member of the National Assembly of Pakistan
- In office 1 June 2013 – 31 May 2018
- Constituency: NA-190 (Bahawalnagar-III)

Personal details
- Born: May 11, 1960 (age 66)
- Relatives: Tariq Bashir Cheema (brother)

Chaudhry Tahir Bashir Cheema (Urdu: چوہدری طاہر بشیر چیمہ; born 11 May 1960) is a Pakistani politician who was a member of the National Assembly of Pakistan, from June 2013 to May 2018.

== Early life ==
He was born on 11 May 1960. His family hails from Yazman, Bahwalpur.

== Political career ==
He ran for the seat of the Provincial Assembly of the Punjab as a candidate of Pakistan Democratic Alliance (PDA) from Constituency PP-231 (Bahawalnagar-VII) in the 1990 Pakistani general election but was unsuccessful. He received 24,224 votes and lost the seat to Muhammad Akram, a candidate of Islami Jamhoori Ittehad (IJI).

He was elected to the Provincial Assembly of the Punjab as a candidate of Pakistan Peoples Party (PPP) from Constituency PP-231 (Bahawalnagar-VII) in the 1993 Pakistani general election. He received 36,912 votes and defeated Muhammad Akram, a candidate of Pakistan Muslim League (N) (PML-N).

He ran for the seat of the Provincial Assembly of the Punjab as a candidate PPP from Constituency PP-231 (Bahawalnagar-VII) in the 1997 Pakistani general election but was unsuccessful. He received 22,518 votes and lost the seat to Muhammad Akram, a candidate of PML-N.

He served as Chishtian Tehsil Nazim from 2001 to 2004.

In 2004 he was elected to National Assembly as a candidate of PML-Q in bye-election in Chishtian

He ran for the seat of the National Assembly of Pakistan as a candidate of Pakistan Muslim League (Q) (PML-Q) from Constituency NA-190 (Bahawalnagar-III) in the 2008 Pakistani general election but was unsuccessful. He received 70,081 votes and lost the seat to Abdul Ghafoor Chaudhry.

He was elected to the National Assembly as a candidate of PML-N from Constituency NA-190 (Bahawalnagar-III) in the 2013 Pakistani general election. He received 83,353 votes and defeated Ijaz-ul-Haq.

He quit PML-N in April 2018. In May 2018, he joined Pakistan Tehreek-e-Insaf (PTI).
