= PP-246 Bahawalpur-II =

Constituency of the Punjabi Provincial Legislature, Pakistan

- Constituency for the Provincial Assembly of Punjab
- Region: Hasilpur Tehsil (partly) including Hasilpur city of Bahawalpur District

Current constituency
- Created from: PP-274 Bahawalpur-VIII (2002-2018); PP-248 Bahawalpur-IV (2018-2023)

PP-246 Bahawalpur-II (پی پی-246، بہاولپور-2) is a Constituency of Provincial Assembly of Punjab.

== General elections 2024 ==
Provincial election 2024: PP-246 Bahawalpur-II
Party	Candidate	Votes	%	±%
Independent	Farzana Khalil (Note: Filed nomination papers as PTI candidate but ECP allowed him to run as an Independent)	68,749	50.03	
PML(N)	Muhammad Afzal Gill	56,736	41.29	
TLP	Muhammad Mohsin	5,584	4.06	
PPP	Muhammad Kamran Khalid	3,041	2.21	
Others	Others (nine candidates)	3,314	2.41	
Turnout		140,587	55.84	
Total valid votes		137,424	97.75	
Rejected ballots		3,163	2.25	
Majority		12,013	8.74	
Registered electors		251,776		
hold				

== General elections 2018 ==
Provincial election 2018: PP-248 Bahawalpur-IV
Party	Candidate	Votes	%	±%
PML(N)	Muhammad Afzal Gill	48,983	40.39	
Independent	Khalil Ahmad	34,778	28.68	
PTI	Syed Ali Zain Bukhari	31,968	26.36	
TLP	Muhammad Ayaz	3,655	3.01	
Independent	Zaheer Anjum	1,433	1.18	
Others	Others (two candidates)	457	0.37	
Turnout		125,108	59.41	
Total valid votes		121,274	96.94	
Rejected ballots		3,834	3.06	
Majority		14,205	11.71	
Registered electors		210,598		

== General elections 2013 ==
Provincial election 2013: PP-274 Bahawalpur-VIII
Party	Candidate	Votes	%	±%
PML(N)	Muhammad Afzal Gill	36,570	37.35	
PML(Q)	Riaz Ahmed	28,513	29.12	
PTI	Syed Ali Zain Bukhari	21,160	21.61	
Independent	Malik Muhammad Naeem	10,195	10.41	
Others	Others (seven candidates)	1,469	1.50	
Turnout		100,896	63.08	
Total valid votes		97,907	97.04	
Rejected ballots		2,989	2.96	
Majority		8,057	8.23	
Registered electors		159,955		

== General elections 2008 ==
Contesting candidates	Party affiliation	Votes polled

== See also ==
- PP-245 Bahawalpur-I
- PP-247 Bahawalpur-III
