= PP-248 Bahawalpur-IV =

Constituency of the Punjabi Provincial Legislature, Pakistan

- Constituency for the Provincial Assembly of Punjab
- Region: Yazman Tehsil (partly) including Cholistan Desert area of Bahawalpur District

Current constituency
- Created from: PP-276 Bahawalpur-X (2002-2018); PP-250 Bahawalpur-VI (2018-2023)

PP-248 Bahawalpur-IV (پی پی-248، بہاولپور-4) is a Constituency of Provincial Assembly of Punjab.

== General elections 2024 ==
Provincial election 2024: PP-248 Bahawalpur-IV
Party	Candidate	Votes	%	±%
PML(Q)	Hasan Askari Sheikh	53,852	39.52	
PML(N)	Saad Masood	48,400	35.52	
Independent	Hasan Khurshid Warraich (Note: Filed nomination papers as PTI candidate but ECP allowed him to run as an Independent)	19,460	14.28	
TLP	Usman Ghani	6,229	4.57	
Independent	Tariq Mehmood	2,208	1.62	
Others	Others (eleven candidates)	6,128	4.49	
Turnout		140,028	59.96	
Total valid votes		136,277	97.32	
Rejected ballots		3,751	2.68	
Majority		5,452	4.00	
Registered electors		233,529		
hold				

== General elections 2018 ==
Provincial election 2018: PP-250 Bahawalpur-VI
Party	Candidate	Votes	%	±%
PML(Q)	Muhammad Afzal	51,311	47.62	
PML(N)	Ch. Saad Masood	47,979	44.53	
TLP	Muhammad Naveed Asghar	4,357	4.04	
PPP	Walayat Ahmed	3,109	2.89	
Others	Others (six candidates)	997	0.92	
Turnout		110,302	66.04	
Total valid votes		107,753	97.69	
Rejected ballots		2,549	2.31	
Majority		3,332	3.09	
Registered electors		167,029		

== General elections 2013 ==
Provincial election 2013: PP-276 Bahawalpur-X
Party	Candidate	Votes	%	±%
PML(Q)	Dr. Muhammad Afzal	44,568	52.43	
PML(N)	Saad Masood	31,751	37.35	
Independent	Shaikh Hassan Mehmood Qurashi	4,125	4.85	
Independent	Sahabzada Shahzain Abasi	3,650	4.29	
Others	Others (nine candidates)	906	1.07	
Turnout		88,660	67.44	
Total valid votes		85,000	95.87	
Rejected ballots		3,660	4.13	
Majority		12,817	15.08	
Registered electors		131,463		

== General elections 2008 ==
Contesting candidates	Party affiliation	Votes polled

== See also ==
- PP-247 Bahawalpur-III
- PP-249 Bahawalpur-V
