= PP-247 Bahawalpur-III =

Constituency of the Punjabi Provincial Legislature, Pakistan

- Constituency for the Provincial Assembly of Punjab
- Region: Yazman Tehsil (partly) including Yazman town of Bahawalpur District

Current constituency
- Created from: PP-275 Bahawalpur-IX (2002-2018); PP-249 Bahawalpur-V (2018-2023)

PP-247 Bahawalpur-III (پی پی-247، بہاولپور-3) is a Constituency of Provincial Assembly of Punjab.

== General elections 2024 ==
Provincial election 2024: PP-247 Bahawalpur-III
| Party | Candidate | Votes | % | ±% |
|---|---|---|---|---|
| PML(N) | Khalid Mahmood Jajja | 61,321 | 39.29 | |
| PML(Q) | Wali Daad Cheema | 50,809 | 32.55 | |
| Independent | Hakim Ali Randhawa (Note: Filed nomination papers as PTI candidate but ECP allowed him to run as an Independent) | 23,678 | 18.28 | |
| TLP | Muhammad Naeem | 6,880 | 4.41 | |
| Independent | Muhammad Jahangir Hashmi | 2,192 | 1.40 | |
| Others | Others (thirteen candidates) | 6,362 | 4.07 | |
| Turnout | | 160,173 | 64.06 | |
| Total valid votes | | 156,092 | 97.45 | |
| Rejected ballots | | 4,081 | 2.55 | |
| Majority | | 10,512 | 6.74 | |
| Registered electors | | 250,053 | | |
| hold | | | | |

== General elections 2018 ==
Provincial election 2018: PP-249 Bahawalpur-V
| Party | Candidate | Votes | % | ±% |
|---|---|---|---|---|
| PML(Q) | Ehsan Ul Haque | 48,433 | 41.45 | |
| PML(N) | Khalid Mahmood Jajja | 47,868 | 40.97 | |
| PTI | Farzana Raoof | 10,413 | 8.91 | |
| TLP | Mehmood Ul Hassan | 7,654 | 6.55 | |
| Others | Others (four candidates) | 2,470 | 2.12 | |
| Turnout | | 119,235 | 62.51 | |
| Total valid votes | | 116,838 | 97.99 | |
| Rejected ballots | | 2,397 | 2.01 | |
| Majority | | 565 | 0.48 | |
| Registered electors | | 190,761 | | |

== General elections 2013 ==
Provincial election 2013: PP-275 Bahawalpur-IX
| Party | Candidate | Votes | % | ±% |
|---|---|---|---|---|
| PML(N) | Ch. Khalid Mehmood Jajja | 51,792 | 52.21 | |
| PML(Q) | Ahsan Ul Haq | 43,836 | 44.19 | |
| Others | Others (fifteen candidates) | 3,575 | 3.60 | |
| Turnout | | 102,350 | 68.76 | |
| Total valid votes | | 99,203 | 96.93 | |
| Rejected ballots | | 3,147 | 3.07 | |
| Majority | | 7,956 | 8.02 | |
| Registered electors | | 148,842 | | |

== General elections 2008 ==
| Contesting candidates | Party affiliation | Votes polled |

== See also ==
- PP-246 Bahawalpur-II
- PP-248 Bahawalpur-IV
