= Choudhary Khush Akhtar Subhani =

Pakistani politician (died 2021)

Member of the Provincial Assembly of Punjab
- In office 15 August 2018 – 31 May 2021
- Constituency: PP-38 (Sialkot-IV)
- In office 20 October 2002 – 18 September 2007
- Constituency: PP-38 (Sialkot-IV)
- In office 12 May 1993 – 10 October 1996
- Constituency: PP-38 (Sialkot-IV)
- In office 15 November 1990 – 28 February 1993
- Constituency: PP-38 (Sialkot-IV)

Provincial Minister for Prisons/Poulation Welfare (Punjab)
- In office 1993–1996

Personal details
- Born: 15 September 1965 Sialkot, Punjab, Pakistan
- Died: 31 May 2021 (aged 55) Sialkot, Punjab, Pakistan
- Party: PMLN (2013-2021)
- Other political affiliations: PML(Q) (2002-2013); PMLN (1997-2001); PML-J (1993-1997)
- Parent: Akhtar Ali Vario (father)
- Relatives: Tariq Subhani (brother); Armaghan Subhani (cousin)

Choudhary Khush Akhtar Subhani (Urdu: چوہدری خوش اختر سبحانی) was a Pakistani politician who had been a member of the Provincial Assembly of the Punjab since August 2018 to 31 May 2021. His father, Chaudhry Akhtar Ali Vario, was a prominent politician and landlord of Sialkot who served as Chairman District Council Sialkot, Provincial Minister of Punjab, Member National Assembly and Member Provincial Assembly several times.

== Early life ==
He was born on 15 September 1965 to Akhtar Ali Vario in a landlord Punjabi family of Muslim Gujjars in Sialkot District, Punjab.

== Political career ==
He was elected to Provincial Assembly of the Punjab as candidate of IJI from PP 104 Sialkot in 1990 Pakistan general elections and was made Chairman Standing committee on Food. He took 42,960 votes and defeated Idrees Bajwa a candidate of PDA.

He was re-elected to provincial Assembly of Punjab as candidate of PML-J in 1993 Pakistan general elections and became minister for Population Welfare & Prisons, Housing & Physical planning and Environmental Planning. He got 39,579 votes and defeated Ch. Muhammad Aslam a PML-N candidate who got 27,463 votes. During this term after the Chief Minister Manzoor Wattoo was unseated, PMLJ nominated Subhani for the top office in Punjab, but his nomination papers were rejected due to him not meeting the minimum age limit. In return Sardar Arif Nakai was nominated and made the Chief Minister of Punjab.

He was again elected to Provincial Assembly of the Punjab in 2002 general elections from PP-125 (Sialkot V) constituency as candidate of PML Q. He defeated Tahir Mehmood Hundli a candidate of PPP.

He ran for the seat of Provincial Assembly of the Punjab in 2008 general elections from PP-125 but lost the seat to Ch Tahir Mehmood Hundli a PPP candidate.

He was elected to the Provincial Assembly of the Punjab for 4th term as a candidate of Pakistan Muslim League (N) from Constituency PP-38 (Sialkot-IV) in the 2018 Pakistani general election. He got 57636 votes in the 2018 general election.

== Death ==
He died on Sunday May 30, 2021. He was suffering from liver disorders and was admitted at a hospital in Lahore.
