= Munawar Ahmed Gill =

Pakistani politician

Member of the Provincial Assembly of the Punjab
- In office 2008 – 31 May 2018

Personal details
- Born: 14 May 1956 (age 70) Sialkot
- Party: Pakistan Tehreek-e-Insaaf

Punjab Assembly Lahore

Munawar Ahmed Gill is a Pakistani politician who was a Member of the Provincial Assembly of the Punjab, from 1997 to 1999 and again from 2008 to May 2018.

== Early life and education ==
He was born on 14 May 1956 in Sialkot.

He graduated in 2003 from University of the Punjab and has the degree of Bachelor of Arts.

== Political career ==
He ran for the seat of the Provincial Assembly of the Punjab as an independent candidate from Constituency PP-109 (Sialkot-VIII) in the 1988 Pakistani general election, but was unsuccessful. He received 7,780 votes and lost the seat to Nawaz Sharif.

He ran for the seat of the Provincial Assembly of the Punjab as a candidate of Pakistan Democratic Alliance (PDA) from Constituency PP-109 (Sialkot-VIII) in the 1990 Pakistani general election, but was unsuccessful. He received 19,660 votes and lost the seat to a candidate of Islami Jamhoori Ittehad.

He ran for the seat of the Provincial Assembly of the Punjab as an independent candidate from Constituency PP-109 (Sialkot-VIII) in the 1990 Pakistani general election, but was unsuccessful. He received 7,832 votes and lost the seat to Ghulam Abbas, a candidate of Pakistan Peoples Party (PPP).

He was elected to the Provincial Assembly of the Punjab as a candidate of Pakistan Muslim League (N) (PML-N) from Constituency PP-127 (Sialkot-VII) in the 1997 Pakistani general election. He received 31,572 votes and defeated Ghulam Abbas, a candidate of PPP.

He was re-elected to the Provincial Assembly of the Punjab as a candidate of PML-N from Constituency PP-127 (Sialkot-VII) in the 2008 Pakistani general election. He received 34,318 votes and defeated Armaghan Subhani. From 2008 to 2013, he served as Political Assistant to Chief Minister of Punjab Shehbaz Sharif.

He was re-elected to the Provincial Assembly of the Punjab as a candidate of PML-N from Constituency PP-127 (Sialkot-VII) in the 2013 Pakistani general election.
