= Riaz Hussain Pirzada =

Pakistani politician (born 1948)

- ریاض حسین پیرزادہ

Ministry of Housing and Works (Pakistan)
- Incumbent
- Assumed office 11 March 2024
- President: Asif Ali Zardari
- Prime Minister: Shehbaz Sharif

Member of the National Assembly of Pakistan
- Incumbent
- Assumed office 29 February 2024
- Constituency: NA-164 Bahawalpur-I
- In office 1 June 2013 – 31 May 2018
- Constituency: NA-186 (Bahawalpur-IV)
- In office 2008–2013
- Constituency: NA-186 (Bahawalpur-IV)
- In office 2002–2008
- Constituency: NA-186 (Bahawalpur-IV)
- In office 1993–1997
- Constituency: NA-143 (Bahawalpur)

Minister for Inter Provincial Coordination
- In office 4 August 2017 – 31 May 2018
- President: Mamnoon Hussain
- Prime Minister: Shahid Khaqan Abbasi
- Succeeded by: Muhammad Azam Khan
- In office 28 June 2013 – 28 April 2017

Minister of Federal Education and Professional Training
- In office 30 July 2011 – June 2012
- Prime Minister: Yusuf Raza Gillani

Federal Minister Without Portfolio
- In office 1 July 2011 – 29 July 2011
- Prime Minister: Yusuf Raza Gillani

Federal Minister for Health
- In office May 2011 – June 2011
- Prime Minister: Yusuf Raza Gillani

Ministry of Minorities (Pakistan)
- In office May 2011 – May 2011
- Prime Minister: Yusuf Raza Gillani

Member of the Provincial Assembly of Punjab
- In office 1985–1988

Ministry of Human Rights (Pakistan)
- In office 19 April 2022 – 10 August 2023
- President: Arif Alvi
- Prime Minister: Shehbaz Sharif

Personal details
- Born: 1 August 1948 (age 78) Bahawalpur, Bahawalpur State, Pakistan
- Party: PMLN (2013-present)
- Other political affiliations: PML(Q) (2008-2013); National Alliance (Pakistan) (2002-2008); PPP (1993-1997); IND (1985-1988)

Riaz Hussain Pirzada (Urdu: ریاض حسین پیرزادہ; born 1 August 1948) is a Pakistani politician who currently holds the position of Federal Minister for Housing and Works. He has been serving as a member of the National Assembly of Pakistan since 29 February 2024. He has held previous terms in the National Assembly from August 2018 to August 2023 and from 1993 to May 2018. Additionally, he was a member of the Provincial Assembly of Punjab from 1985 to 1988.

Pirzada's political career includes roles in various ministerial positions. He served as the Minister for Inter-Provincial Coordination in the Shahid Khaqan Abbasi cabinet from August 2017 to May 2018. Affiliated with the Pakistan Muslim League (Nawaz), he previously held the position of Federal Minister for Inter-Provincial Coordination from 2013 to 2017. He also served as the Federal Minister for Minorities and Minister for Health in 2011, as well as the Minister for Professional and Technical Training from 2011 to 2012. Furthermore, he held the portfolio of Minister of Human Rights from 19 April 2022 to 9 August 2023 in the PDM government led by Shehbaz Sharif.

As of 11 March 2024, Riaz Pirzada is a Federal Minister of Housing and works in the coalition government led by Prime Minister Shehbaz Sharif.

== Early life and education ==
Pirzada was born on 1 August 1948 in Sheikh Wahan, Bahawalpur. He graduated from the Sadiq Public School Bahawalpur, and later received his LL.B Degree from University Law College, Lahore in 1969.

== Political career ==
Pirzada was elected to the Provincial Assembly of Punjab in the 1985 Pakistani general election where he served until 1988. During his tenure as a member of the Punjab Assembly, he served as the Provincial Minister of Punjab.

He was elected to the National Assembly of Pakistan as a candidate of the Pakistan Peoples Party (PPP) from Constituency NA-143 (Bahawalpur) in the 1993 Pakistani general election where he served until 1997.

He was elected to the National Assembly as a candidate of the National Alliance from Constituency NA-186 (Bahawalpur-IV) in the 2002 Pakistani general election. He received 60,456 votes and defeated Syed Tasneem Nawaz Gardezi, a candidate of PML-Q.

He was re-elected to the National Assembly as a candidate of PML-Q from Constituency NA-186 (Bahawalpur-IV) in the 2008 Pakistani general election. He received 66,757 votes and defeated an independent candidate, Syed Tasneem Nawaz Gardezi. In May 2011, he was inducted into the federal cabinet of Prime Minister Yousaf Raza Gillani and was made Federal Minister of Minorities where he served in May 2011. In May 2011, he was made Federal Minister for Health where he served until June 2011. From 1 July to 29 July 2011, he remained in the federal cabinet without any ministerial portfolio. On 30 July 2011, he was made Minister of Federal Education and Professional Training where he served until June 2012.

He was re-elected to the National Assembly as a candidate of Pakistan Muslim League (N) (PML-N) from Constituency NA-186 (Bahawalpur-IV) in the 2013 Pakistani general election. He received 74,491 votes and defeated Tariq Bashir Cheema.

In June 2013, he was inducted into the federal cabinet of Prime Minister Nawaz Sharif and was made Federal Minister for Inter-provincial Coordination. In 2017, he resigned from his post of Minister for Inter-provincial Coordination in protest alleging that there was interference in his ministry by the principal secretary of Prime Minister Nawaz Sharif.

He ceased to hold ministerial office in July 2017 when the federal cabinet was disbanded following the resignation of Prime Minister Nawaz Sharif after the Panama Papers case decision. Following the election of Shahid Khaqan Abbasi as Prime Minister of Pakistan in August 2017, he was inducted into the federal cabinet of Abbasi. He was appointed as federal minister for Inter-Provincial Coordination. Upon the dissolution of the National Assembly on the expiration of its term on 31 May 2018, Pirzada ceased to hold office as Federal Minister for Inter-Provincial Coordination.

He was re-elected to the National Assembly as a candidate of PML-N from Constituency NA-171 (Bahawalpur-II) in the 2018 Pakistani general election. He defeated Naeem Ud Din Waraich of PTI.

In the 2024 Pakistan General Elections, Pirzada ran as a candidate representing the PMLN in the NA-164 Bahawalpur 1 constituency, securing victory with 123,360 votes.
