= PP-245 Bahawalpur-I =

Constituency of the Punjabi Provincial Legislature, Pakistan

- Constituency for the Provincial Assembly of Punjab
- Region: Khairpur Tamiwali Tehsil, Hasilpur Tehsil (partly) and Bahawalpur Saddar Tehsil (partly) of Bahawalpur District

Current constituency
- Member: vacant
- Created from: PP-273 Bahawalpur-VII (2002-2018); PP-247 Bahawalpur-III (2018-2023)

PP-245 Bahawalpur-I (پی پی-245، بہاولپور-1) is a Constituency of Provincial Assembly of Punjab.

== General elections 2024 ==
Provincial election 2024: PP-245 Bahawalpur-I
Party	Candidate	Votes	%	±%
PML(N)	Muhammad Kazim Pirazda	54,225	43.87	
Independent	Muhammad Ameer Khan (Note: Filed nomination papers as PTI candidate but ECP allowed him to run as an Independent)	46,608	37.71	
PPP	Tahir Amin	7,642	6.18	
IPP	Syed Tehseen Nawaz Gardezi	6,765	5.47	
TLP	Rana Azhar Afzal Khan	5,264	4.26	
Others	Others (six candidates)	3,096	2.51	
Turnout		126,823	53.31	
Total valid votes		123,600	97.46	
Rejected ballots		3,223	2.54	
Majority		7,617	6.16	
Registered electors		237,898		
hold				

== General elections 2018 ==
Provincial election 2018: PP-247 Bahawalpur-III
Party	Candidate	Votes	%	±%
PML(N)	Muhammad Kazim Pirazda	51,497	45.18	
Independent	Muhammad Nawaz	29,917	26.25	
PTI	Syed Bilal Mustafa Gardezi	23,838	20.91	
PPP	Rao Tariq Mahmood	7,153	6.28	
MMA	Hafiz Khair Muhammad	1,576	1.38	
Turnout		118,060	60.79	
Total valid votes		113,981	96.55	
Rejected ballots		4,079	3.45	
Majority		21,580	18.93	
Registered electors		194,225		

== General elections 2013 ==
Provincial election 2013: PP-273 Bahawalpur-VII
Party	Candidate	Votes	%	±%
PML(N)	Muhammad Kazim Ali Peerzada	40,135	42.54	
PML(Q)	Syed Bilal Mustafa Gardezi	28,800	30.53	
PTI	Rao Tariq Mehmood	18,282	19.38	
Independent	Shahid Ameen Wains	2,975	3.15	
Independent	Mahr Muhammad Akhter	2,069	2.19	
Others	Others (six candidates)	2,079	2.20	
Turnout		97,382	64.73	
Total valid votes		94,340	96.88	
Rejected ballots		3,042	3.12	
Majority		11,335	12.01	
Registered electors		150,450		

== General elections 2008 ==
Contesting candidates	Party affiliation	Votes polled

== See also ==
- PP-244 Bahawalnagar-VIII
- PP-246 Bahawalpur-II
