= NA-164 Bahawalpur-I =

Constituency of the National Assembly of Pakistan

- Constituency for the National Assembly of Pakistan
- Region: Bahawalpur Saddar Tehsil (partly), Khairpur Tamewali and Hasilpur Tehsils of Bahawalpur District
- Electorate: 489,674

Current constituency
- Party: Pakistan Muslim League (N)
- Member: Riaz Hussain Pirzada
- Created from: NA-183 Bahawalpur-IV

NA-164 Bahawalpur-I (این اے-164، بہاولپور-1) is a constituency for the National Assembly of Pakistan.

== Members of Parliament ==
=== 2018–2023: NA-171 Bahawalpur-II ===
Election	Member	Party
2018	Riaz Hussain Pirzada	PML(N)

=== 2024–present: NA-164 Bahawalpur-I ===
Election	Member	Party
2024	Riaz Hussain Pirzada	PML(N)

== Election 2002 ==
General elections were held on 10 October 2002. Mian Riaz Hussain Peerzada of National Alliance won by 66,757 votes.

General election 2002: NA-186 Bahawalpur-IV
Party	Candidate	Votes	%	±%
NA	Mian Riaz Hussain Pirzada	60,456	43.73	
PML(Q)	Syed Tasneem Nawaz Gardezi	56,729	41.03	
PML(N)	Muhammad Baleegh-ur-Rehman	11,812	8.54	
PPP	Syed Mubashar Zaman Shah	8,659	6.26	
Others	Others (three candidates)	599	0.44	
Turnout		141,500	49.16	
Total valid votes		138,255	97.71	
Rejected ballots		3,245	2.29	
Majority		3,727	2.70	
Registered electors		287,829		

== Election 2008 ==
General elections were held on 18 February 2008. Mian Riaz Hussain Peerzada of PML-Q won by 60,456 votes.

General election 2008: NA-186 Bahawalpur-IV
Party	Candidate	Votes	%	±%
PML(Q)	Mian Riaz Hussain Pirzada	66,757	42.71	
Independent	Syed Tasneem Nawaz Gardezi	50,468	32.29	
PML(N)	Ch. Muhammad Jamil Johar	21,123	13.51	
PPP	Muhammad Nawazish Ali Pirzada	17,947	11.48	
Turnout		161,398	46.69	
Total valid votes		156,295	96.84	
Rejected ballots		5,103	3.16	
Majority		16,289	10.42	
Registered electors		345,653		
PML(Q) gain from NA				

== Election 2013 ==
General elections were held on 11 May 2013. Mian Riaz Hussain Peerzada of PML-N won by 74,491 votes and became the member of National Assembly.

General election 2013: NA-186 Bahawalpur-IV
Party	Candidate	Votes	%	±%
PML(N)	Mian Riaz Hussain Pirzada	74,491	38.69	
PML(Q)	Ch. Tariq Bashir Cheema	61,403	31.90	
PTI	Ch. Naeem Ud Din Waraich	52,958	27.51	
Others	Others (seven candidates)	3,667	1.90	
Turnout		198,228	63.86	
Total valid votes		192,519	97.12	
Rejected ballots		5,709	2.88	
Majority		13,088	6.79	
Registered electors		310,421		
PML(N) gain from PML(Q)				

== Election 2018 ==
General elections were held on 25 July 2018.

General election 2018: NA-171 Bahawalpur-II
Party	Candidate	Votes	%	±%
PML(N)	Riaz Hussain Pirzada	99,202	41.95	
PTI	Chaudhary Naeemuddin Warraich	88,297	37.34	
Others	Others (five candidates)	48,923	20.69	
Turnout		242,707	59.95	
Total valid votes		236,452	97.42	
Rejected ballots		6,255	2.58	
Majority		10,905	4.61	
Registered electors		404,823		
PML(N) hold		Swing	N/A	

== Election 2024 ==
General elections were held on 8 February 2024. Riaz Hussain Pirzada won the election with votes.

General election 2024: NA-164 Bahawalpur-I
Party	Candidate	Votes	%	±%
PML(N)	Riaz Hussain Pirzada	123,377	44.65	▲2.70
PTI	Malik Ejaz Ahmad Gaddan (Note: Filed nomination papers as PTI candidate but ECP allowed him to run as an Independent)	117,176	42.40	▲5.06
Others	Others (eleven candidates)	36,796	12.95	
Turnout		282,986	57.79	▼2.16
Total valid votes		276,349	97.65	
Rejected ballots		6,637	2.35	
Majority		6,201	2.24	▼2.37
Registered electors		489,674		
PML(N) hold		Swing	N/A	

== See also ==
- NA-163 Bahawalnagar-IV
- NA-165 Bahawalpur-II
