= Punjab Land Records Authority =

Government agency in Pakistan

Punjab Land Records Authority (PLRA)
- پنجاب اراضی ریکارڈ سینٹر

Agency overview
- Formed: 2017; 9 years ago
- Jurisdiction: Punjab, Pakistan
- Agency executives: Tariq Subhani, Chairman; Capt.(retd) Ikram ul Haq, Director General
- Website: Punjab Land Records Authority

Punjab Land Records Authority (reporting name: PLRA) is the Punjab Government's agency that is responsible for land registration. It was established under the administrative control of the Board of Revenue to replace the Patwari culture in Punjab.

== History ==
The Punjab Land Record Authority (PLRA) was created in 2017 by the government of Punjab, Pakistan. It was set up to provide citizens with a secure, reliable and accurate land record system. The PLRA was created to address the growing need for accurate and up-to-date land ownership records in the province. The PLRA maintains a database of land records, including ownership records, boundary lines, and other important information. It also provides a range of services, such as online land registration, land transfer, and dispute resolution.
