= Chaudhry Mazhar Iqbal =

Pakistani politician

Member of the Provincial Assembly of the Punjab
- In office 15 August 2018 – 14 January 2023
- Constituency: PP-243 Bahawalnagar-VII

Personal details
- Born: 15 August 1961 (age 65) Bahawalnagar, Punjab, Pakistan
- Party: TLP (2025-present)
- Other political affiliations: PMLN (2018-2025)

Chaudhry Mazhar Iqbal is a Pakistani politician who had been a member of the Provincial Assembly of the Punjab from August 2018 till January 2023. Professionally, he's a doctor and an orthopaedic surgeon.

== Early life and education ==
Chaudhry Mazhar Iqbal was born on 15 August 1961 in Bahawalnagar, Punjab. He received his MBBS degree in 1985 from King Edward Medical College, Lahore, and completed an MS in Orthopedics in 1990 at the Postgraduate Medical Institute, Government of the Punjab, Lahore.

His father Chaudhry Abdul Ghafoor and his brother, Chaudhry Zafar Iqbal, have both been politicians, the former being a minister under Nawaz Sharif.

== Academic career ==
He is a doctor and orthopaedic surgeon, trained in the United States, who served in various capacities at King Edward Medical College and Mayo Hospital, Lahore. His official positions included Medical Officer (1986–1987), Registrar (1987–1990), Senior Registrar (1990), and Assistant Professor (1990–1997) in the Health Department at King Edward and Mayo Hospital. He has also been actively involved with the Pakistan Orthopaedic Association, holding several offices over the years: Executive Member (Punjab, 1991–1992), Joint Secretary (North Punjab, 1992–1993), Vice President (North Punjab, 1997–1998), and Treasurer (North Punjab, 2009–2011). He has authored multiple research papers and publications in the field of orthopaedics and has represented Pakistan at international orthopaedic conferences in Spain, China, Switzerland, South Africa, and Malaysia.

== Political career ==
He was elected to the Provincial Assembly of the Punjab as a candidate of Pakistan Muslim League (N) from Constituency PP-243 (Bahawalnagar-VII) in the 2018 Pakistani general election.
