= Armaghan Subhani =

Pakistani politician (born 1966)

Chaudhary Armghan Subhani
- چوہدری ارمغان سبحانی

State Minister Ministry of Planning Development & Special Initiatives
- Incumbent
- Assumed office 14 March 2025

Member of the National Assembly of Pakistan
- Incumbent
- Assumed office 29 February 2024
- Constituency: NA-70 Sialkot-I
- In office 13 August 2018 – 10 August 2023
- Constituency: NA-66 (Sialkot-I)
- In office 1 June 2013 – 31 May 2018
- Constituency: NA-66 (Sialkot-I)

Member Provincial Assembly of Punjab
- In office 2002–2007
- In office 1993–1996

Federal Parliamentary Secretary for Climate Change
- In office 2017–2018

Provincial Minister for Power (Punjab)
- In office 2002–2007

Personal details
- Born: 5 January 1966 (age 60) Sialkot, Punjab, Pakistan
- Party: PMLN (2013-present)
- Other political affiliations: PML(Q) (2002-2013); PMLN (1997-2001); PML-J (1993-1997)
- Relatives: Choudhary Khush Akhtar Subhani (cousin); Tariq Subhani (cousin)

Chaudhry Armaghan Subhani (Urdu: چوہدری ارمغان سبحانی; born 5 January 1966) is a Pakistani politician who is the Minister of State for Ministry of Planning Development & Special Initiatives, a member of the National Assembly of Pakistan since 29 February 2024 and previously served in this position from June 2013 to May 2018 and from August 2018 to August 2023. He was a member of the Provincial Assembly of the Punjab from 1993 to 1996 and again from 2002 to 2007. His cousins Choudhary Khush Akhtar Subhani who held various ministries in Punjab and Tariq Subhani who is the Chairman of the Punjab Land Records Authority, also remained Member of the Provincial Assembly of the Punjab in the Past

== Early life and education ==
Chaudhary Armaghan Subhani was born on 5 January 1966 in a Landlord Punjabi family of Muslim Gujjars in Sialkot District. His father Ch Abdul Sattar Vario was already a prominent and influential politician at that time. He is the oldest of 5 brothers.

He graduated in 1990 from the University of the Punjab and earned the degree of Bachelor of Arts.

== Political career ==
He was elected to the Provincial Assembly of the Punjab from Constituency PP-108 (Sialkot) as a candidate of Pakistan Muslim League (J) in the 1993 Pakistani general election.

He ran for the seat of the Provincial Assembly of the Punjab from Constituency PP-108 (Sialkot) as a candidate of Pakistan Muslim League (Chatha) in the 1997 Pakistani general election but was unsuccessful. He received 11,476 votes and lost the seat to Shahid Mehmood Butt, a candidate of Pakistan Muslim League (N) (PML-N).

He ran for the seat of the National Assembly of Pakistan from constituency PP-113 in 2002 Pakistani general election, he was defeated by the candidate of Pakistan Muslim League (Q), Ali Asjad Malhi.

In the 2002 election, he was re-elected to the Provincial Assembly of the Punjab as a candidate of PML-Q from Constituency PP-127 (Sialkot-VIII). He received 30,624 votes and defeated Syed Kaleem Abbas, a candidate of Pakistan Peoples Party (PPP). He was inducted into cabinet of Pervez Elahi as Minister of Power on 23 November 2003. He served as Provincial Minister till 2007.

He ran for the seat of the Provincial Assembly of the Punjab as a candidate of PML-Q from Constituency PP-127 (Sialkot-VIII) in the 2008 Pakistani general election but was unsuccessful. He received 26,412 votes and lost the seat to Munawar Ahmed Gill.

He was elected to the National Assembly as a candidate of PML-N from Constituency NA-111 (Sialkot-II) in the 2013 Pakistani general election. He received 137,474 votes and defeated Firdous Ashiq Awan. In October 2017, he was appointed Federal Parliamentary Secretary for climate change.

He was re-elected to the National Assembly as a candidate of PML-N from Constituency NA-72 (Sialkot-I) in the 2018 Pakistani general election. He received 129,041 votes and defeated Firdous Ashiq Awan.

He contested the 2024 Pakistani general election from the seat of NA-70 Sialkot-I on the ticket of PMLN. He received 123,437 votes and defeated Sahibzada Hafiz Hamid Raza Independent politician Supported (PTI) Pakistan Tehreek-e-Insaf, candidate. This is his third consecutive electoral victory from Sialkot.

He was appointed as Minister of State for Ministry of Planning, Development & Special Initiatives and took his oath on 14 March 2025.
