= Khawaja Muhammad Safdar =

Pakistani politician

Khawaja Muhammad safdar

Chairman of Majlis-e-Shoora
- In office 1981–1985
- President: Zia-ul-Haq

Member of the Senate of Pakistan
- In office 6 August 1975 – 4 July 1977
- Constituency: Punjab
- In office 6 August 1973 – 5 August 1975
- Constituency: Punjab

Leader of Opposition in Provincial Assembly of West Pakistan
- In office 9 June 1962 – 25 March 1969

Member of the Provincial Assembly of West Pakistan
- In office 9 June 1965 – 25 March 1969
- Constituency: Sialkot-I
- In office 9 June 1962 – 8 June 1965
- Constituency: Sialkot-I

Personal details
- Born: 1922 Sialkot, Punjab, Pakistan
- Died: 1991
- Party: Pakistan Muslim League
- Relations: Khawaja Muhammad Asif (son)

Khawaja Muhammad Safdar (died 1991) was a Pakistani politician and diplomat who was a member of the Pakistan Muslim League. He was the father of Pakistan's incumbent Minister of Defence, Khawaja Asif.

== Early life and career ==
He took an active part in the Pakistan Movement before 1947. In 1981, he was nominated as chairman of Majlis-e-Shoora, Pakistan and also acted as acting president of Pakistan in this capacity.

He is the father of foreign minister of Pakistan in 2017, Khawaja Muhammad Asif. He was elected Member of Provincial Assembly of West Pakistan in 1962 and was thereafter elected as leader of opposition. He was re-elected to both these position in 1965. and served in those positions till 25 March 1969, when General Agha Muhammad Yahya Khan seized power and dissolved the Assemblies. Khawaja Muhammad Safdar contested 1970 elections in Pakistan but lost to a nominee of Pakistan Peoples Party.

Sialkot Medical College was set up in Sialkot in 2011 which was later renamed after Khawaja Muhammad Safdar as Khawaja Muhammad Safdar Medical College. A famous main boulevard in Sialkot on which Khwaja Muhammad Safdar Medical College lies has also been named as Khwaja Muhammad Safdar Road.

== See also ==
- Khawaja Muhammad Safdar Medical College
