= Khawaja Muhammad Safdar Medical College =

Medical school in Punjab, Pakistan

- Motto: Success through Perseverance.
- Type: Public
- Established: 2010; 16 years ago
- Affiliations: PM&DC , UHS
- Principal: Prof. Dr. Huma Kayani Saigol
- Location: Sialkot, Punjab, Pakistan
- Website: www.kmsmc.edu.pk

Khawaja Muhammad Safdar Medical College (formerly, Sialkot Medical College) is a public sector Medical College in Sialkot, Pakistan. It was established on the initiative of CM Shehbaz Sharif to give quality education in the region of Punjab and especially in Sialkot. It was named after Khawaja Muhammad Safdar in 2017, who took an active part in the Pakistan Movement before 1947 and was the father of current political leader of Pakistan Muslim League (N), Khawaja Muhammad Asif. It was established in 2008 with a sanction of PKR 450 million. Affiliated Hospitals include Allama Iqbal Memorial Hospital, Sialkot (400 Beds) and Sardar Begum Memorial Hospital, Sialkot (240) beds. The college is recognised by the Pakistan Medical and Dental Council (PMDC). This college has produced numerous doctors who are now making their mark in various healthcare settings around the world. The students and alumni of KMSMC are commonly referred to as KMSIANS.

== Academic programs ==
- Bachelor of Medicine and Bachelor of Surgery (MBBS) - a 5-year undergraduate programme
- Bsc Nursing
- Paramedical School
- Postgraduate Programs:

 FCPS (Medicine, Surgery, Pediatric Medicine, and others)
 MD (Medicine, Pediatric Medicine, Cardiology, and others)

== Departments ==
- Basic science departments
  - Anatomy
  - Biochemistry
  - Community medicine
  - Forensic medicine
  - Pathology
  - Pharmacology
  - Physiology
- Medicine and allied departments
  - Cardiology
  - Dermatology
  - Endocrinology & Metabolism
  - General medicine
  - Neurology
  - Pediatrics
  - Preventive medicine
  - Psychiatry
  - Pulmonology (Chest medicine)
  - Radiotherapy
  - Urology
- Surgery and allied departments
  - Anesthesiology
  - Cardiac surgery
  - Cosmetic surgery
  - General surgery
  - Neurosurgery
  - Obstetrics and gynaecology
  - Ophthalmology
  - Oral and maxillofacial surgery
  - Orthopedics
  - Otorhinolaryngology
  - Pediatric surgery
  - Radiology
- Administrative departments
  - IT Department

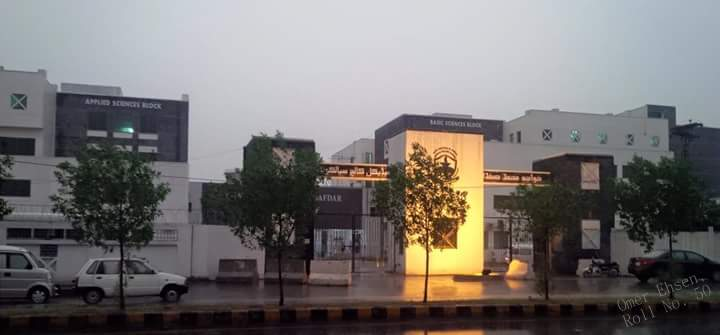
KMSMC Main Entrance

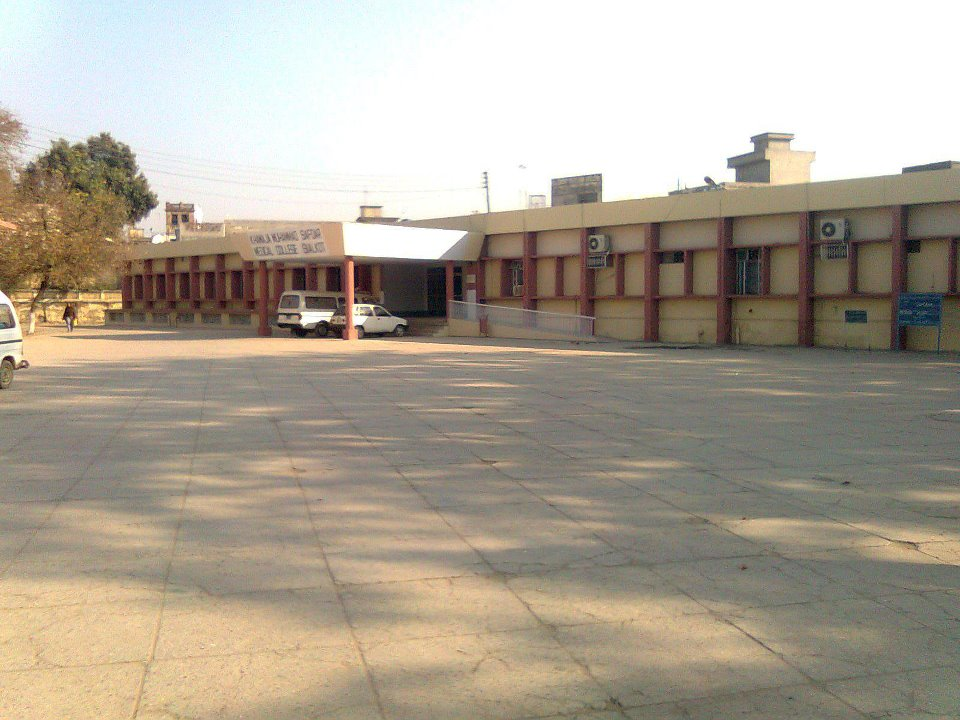
Old College building.

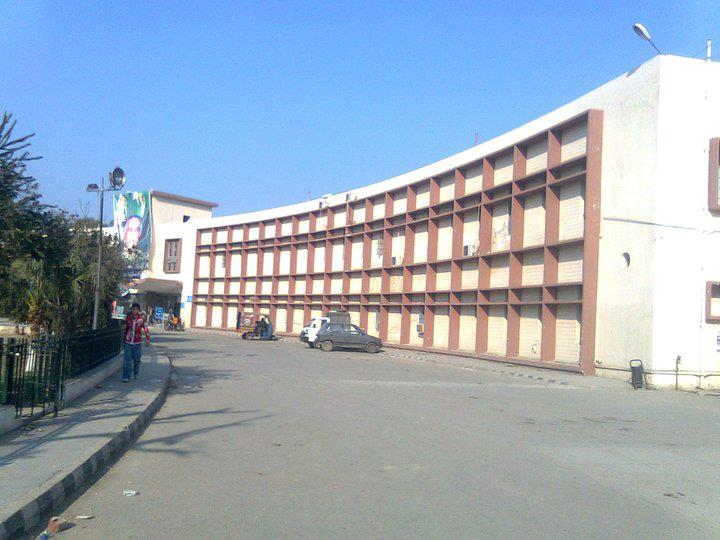
Allama Iqbal Memorial Hospital.

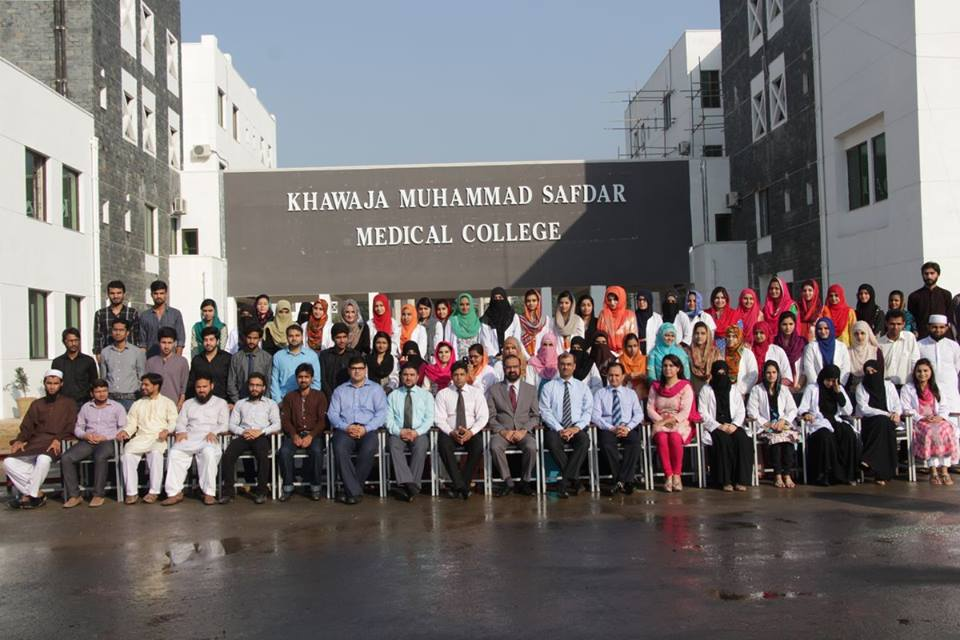
This is Picture of Pioneers of KMSMC, 1st batch, Picture with Faculty.
