= Muhammad Afzal Sindhu =

- محمد افضل سندھو

Personal details
- Born: 31 March 1935 (age 89); Firozpur, Punjab, British India (now India)
- Political party: PTI (2012-present)
- Profession: Lawyer

Muhammad Afzal Sindhu (Urdu, Punjabi: محمد افضل سندھو; born 31 March 1935) is a Pakistani politician and lawmaker who is a member of the National Assembly of Pakistan. His constituency is NA-191 in Bahawalnagar, Punjab. He was born in Firozpur, Punjab and hails from the town of Haroonabad in Bahawalnagar district. He holds a Bachelor of Laws degree.

Sindhu was affiliated with the Pakistan Peoples Party (PPP) and regarded as a key leader of the party. He has previously (from 2008) served as the Minister of State for Law and Justice and was then appointed as federal minister for railways. Before becoming law minister, he held the portfolio of Minister of State for Health. During his tenure as health minister, he oversaw the drafting of a health policy which enabled newly graduated medical students to be able to find fresh jobs in medicine and developed a better framework for certifying official recognition to medical colleges in the country.

In July 2012, Sindhu announced his decision to resign from the PPP and join the Pakistan Tehreek-e-Insaf (PTI) party.
