= Qila Kallar Wala =

Village in Sialkot District, Pakistan

Qila Kalar Wala is a town of Sialkot District situated at Narowal Muridke road in Punjab, Pakistan.
