= Yazman =

Yazman يزمان
- City
- Location within Punjab, Pakistan Location within Pakistan
- Coordinates: 29°7′30″N 71°44′58″E
- Country: Pakistan
- Province: Punjab
- District: Bahawalpur District

Government
- Elevation: 115 m (377 ft)

Population (2023)
  - Total: 60,738
- Time zone: UTC+5 (PST)

Yazman (Urdu: يزمان) is a city and capital of Yazman Tehsil of Bahawalpur District, in the southern part of the Punjab province in Pakistan. It is at an altitude of 115 metres (377 ft).

== Demographics ==
=== Population ===
The population of city in 1972 was 3,579. According to the 2023 Census of Pakistan, the population has risen to 60,738.

Historical population
Year	Pop.	±% p.a.
1951	...	—
1961	...	—
1972	3,579	—
1981	10,060	+12.17%
1998	21,028	+4.43%
2017	48,883	+4.54%
2023	60,738	+3.69%
