= Firdous Ashiq Awan =

Pakistani physician and politician (born 1970)

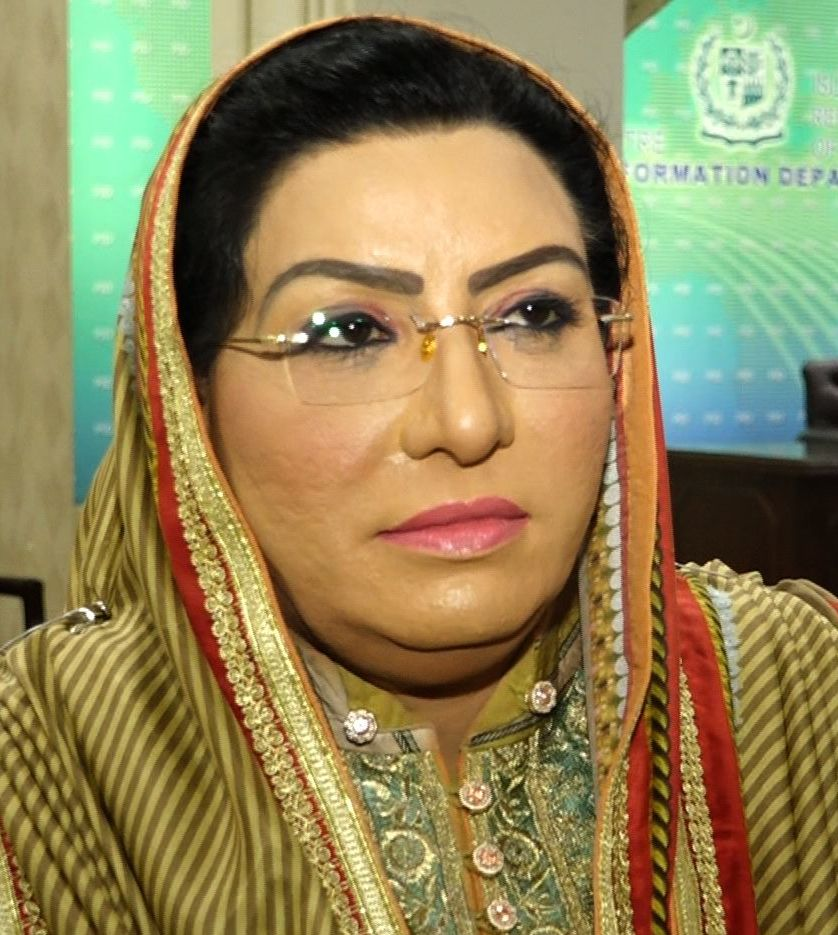

Special Assistant to the Chief Minister of Punjab on Information and Culture
- In office 2 November 2020 – 6 August 2021
- Chief Minister: Usman Buzdar
- Preceded by: Fayyaz ul Hassan Chohan (as Provincial Minister)

Special Assistant to the Prime Minister on Information and Broadcasting (Minister of State)
- In office 18 April 2019 – 27 April 2020
- President: Arif Alvi
- Prime Minister: Imran Khan
- Minister: Imran Khan
- Preceded by: Fawad Chaudhry (as Federal Minister)
- Succeeded by: Shibli Faraz (as Federal Minister); Asim Saleem Bajwa (as Special Assistant)

Federal Minister for National Regulations and Services
- In office 18 April 2012 – 16 March 2013
- President: Asif Ali Zardari
- Prime Minister: Raja Pervaiz Ashraf; Yusuf Raza Gillani

Federal Minister for Information and Broadcasting
- In office 9 February 2011 – 18 April 2012
- President: Asif Ali Zardari
- Prime Minister: Yusuf Raza Gilani
- Succeeded by: Qamar Zaman Kaira in Ashraf ministry

Federal Minister for Population Welfare
- In office 2008–2010
- President: Asif Ali Zardari
- Prime Minister: Yusuf Raza Gillani

Member of the National Assembly of Pakistan
- In office 17 March 2008 – 16 March 2013
- Constituency: NA-111 (Sialkot-II)
- In office 16 November 2002 – 15 November 2007
- Constituency: Reserved seat for women

Personal details
- Born: 11 January 1970 (age 56) Sialkot, Punjab, Pakistan
- Party: IPP (2023-present)
- Other political affiliations: PTI (2017–2023); PPP (2008–2015); PML-Q (2002-2008)
- Education: Fatima Jinnah Medical University

Firdous Ashiq Awan (Punjabi, Urdu: فردوس عاشق اعوان, born 11 January 1970) is a Pakistani politician from Istehkam-e-Pakistan Party. She has served as Special Assistant to Prime Minister on Information and Broadcasting from 2019 to 2020, Federal Minister for National Regulations and Services from 2012 to 2013, Federal Minister for Information and Broadcasting from 2011 to 2012 and as Federal Minister for Population Welfare from 2008 to 2010. She served as the Special Assistant to the Chief Minister of Punjab on Information and Culture, in office from November 2020 to 6 August 2021.

== Family life and education ==
Awan was born on 11 January 1970 in Sialkot, West Pakistan to an Awan family. She is married to businessman Malik Amjad Awan and is a mother of two children.

Awan attended Fatima Jinnah Medical University for her medical degree, MBBS. She started her career from Sir Ganga Ram Hospital. Awan took interest in social works and started Society for Health And Development Exchange (SHADE) in the early 1990s for public welfare.

== Political career ==
Awan started her political career in 1990 when she founded the Society for Health and Development and Exchange and advocated for improving the healthcare system. In 2002 she was elected to the National Assembly on a reserved seat on PML (Q) ticket.

In 2008, she was again elected to the National Assembly from NA-111-Sialkot-II, having joined the Pakistan People's Party. She bagged 77,834 votes against her opponent Chaudhry Ameer Hussain from PML (Q), 45,704 votes.

After being elected she was appointed as Minister for Population welfare in PPP's cabinet. Awan was later given the portfolio of Information ministry in PPP's regime. She presented her resignation to Prime Minister Yousef Raza Gilani on 25 December 2011, during the Special Federal Cabinet Meeting. It was later declined by the Prime Minister after holding a one-to-one meeting with Awan.

On 18 April 2012, Qamar Zaman Kaira was appointed as the new Federal Minister of Information and Broadcasting, while former information minister Firdous Ashiq Awan was reassigned the Ministry of National Regulations and Services.

She resigned from PPP's vice presidency in 2015, On 30 May 2017, she joined Pakistan Tehreek-e-Insaf in Nathia Gali.

In 2018 Pakistani general election she lost her seat on Pakistan Tehreek-e-Insaf's ticket in NA-72 (Sialkot-I) by obtaining 91,393 votes against Pakistan Muslim League (N)'s Armaghan Subhani who secured 129,041 votes.

She was appointed as special assistant to Prime Minister Imran Khan for Information and Broadcasting on 18 April 2019, after the cabinet reshuffle, remaining in the office until 27 April 2020.

On 2 November 2020 she was appointed as special assistant to Chief Minister of Punjab Usman Buzdar for Information. She resigned from her post on 6 August 2021.
