= Pasrur Tehsil =

Administrative unit in Punjab, Pakistan

Pasrur Tehsil تحصیل پسرور
- Tehsil
- Location within Punjab, Pakistan Location within Pakistan
- Coordinates: 32.2625°N 74.6576°E
- Country: Pakistan
- Province: Punjab
- District: Sialkot
- Capital: Pasrur
- Towns: 3
- Union councils: 28

Area
  - Tehsil: 1,016 km^{2} (392 sq mi)

Population (2023)
  - Tehsil: 970,366
  - Density: 955.1/km^{2} (2,474/sq mi)
  - Urban: 131,857 (13.6%)
  - Rural: 838,509 (86.4%)
- Time zone: UTC+5 (PST)
- Area code: 052
- Website: pasrur.pk

Pasrur Tehsil (Urdu: تحصیل پسرور) is an administrative subdivision of Sialkot District in the Punjab province of Pakistan. The city of Pasrur serves as its capital, the tehsil was created during British rule in India. The tehsil covers a total area of 1,020 km^{2} (394 sq mi), and its oldest village is Sabo Bhadiar, located near Qila Kallar Wala. Maanga is one of the villages located in Pasrur Tehsil.

== History ==
The tehsil of Pasrur was created during British rule as the central tehsil of Sialkot District of what was then the undivided British Punjab, it lay between 31°56' and 32°20' N. and 74°32' and 74°57' E., and had an area of 394 square miles. The population in 1901 was 193,746, compared with 203,875 in 1891. The capital, Pasrur, had a population of 8,335 in 1901. It also contained the town of Kila Sobha Singh (population 3,338 in 1901) and 443 villages. The land revenue and cesses in 1903-4 amounted to Rs. 3,10,000. Irrigation dams were an important factor in cultivation, especially in the south and west of the tehsil. The richest tract was the north-east corner. In the centre the country lies higher and is less fertile, while in the south the soil is a sour clay. The Degh passes through the eastern portion.

== Demographics ==
=== Population ===
According to the 2023 census, Pasrur Tehsil has a population of 970,366. The urban population of Pasrur Municipal Committee is 102,717, comprising 52,364 males and 50,286 females. Pasrur Tehsil covers an area of 975 square kilometres, resulting in a population density of approximately 995.25 people per square kilometre. For context, Sialkot District, which includes Pasrur Tehsil, has a total population of 4,499,394 as of 2023. The literacy rate in Pasrur Tehsil is 74.52%.

Historical population
Year	Pop.	±% p.a.
1891	203,875	—
1901	193,746	−0.51%
1951	...	—
1961	...	—
1972	...	—
1981	...	—
1998	611,871	—
2017	840,847	+1.69%
2023	970,366	+2.42%

== See also ==
- Tehsils of Pakistan
  - Tehsils of Punjab, Pakistan
  - Tehsils of Balochistan
  - Tehsils of Khyber Pakhtunkhwa
  - Tehsils of Sindh
  - Tehsils of Azad Kashmir
  - Tehsils of Gilgit-Baltistan
