= Sialkot Tehsil =

Tehsil in Sialkot, Pakistan

Sialkot Tehsil تحصیل سیالکوٹ
- Tehsil
- Tehsil Municipal Administration logo
- Country: Pakistan
- Region: (Punjab, Pakistan) Punjab
- District: Sialkot
- Capital: Sialkot
- Union councils: 52

Government
  - Type: Tehsil Municipal Administration
  - Administrator: Muhammad Umer Sher Chatta
  - Municipal Officer: Muhammad Zaffar Qureshi

Area
  - Tehsil: 901 km^{2} (348 sq mi)

Population (2023)
  - Tehsil: 2,088,201
  - Density: 2,320/km^{2} (6,000/sq mi)
  - Urban: 948,880 (45.44%)
  - Rural: 1,139,321 (54.56%)
- Time zone: UTC+5 (PST)
  - Summer (DST): UTC+6 (PDT)
- Website: TMA Sialkot

Sialkot (Urdu: تحصیل سیالکوٹ), is a tehsil located in Sialkot District, Punjab, Pakistan. It is administratively subdivided into 52 Union Councils.

== History ==
According to the 1901 census, taken during British rule, Sialkot tehsil contained 637 villages and a population of 312,688, an increase of almost 10,000 since the 1891 census (302,866). The land revenue and cesses in 1903-4 amounted to Rs. 400,000.

== Administration ==
The tehsil is subdivided into 52 union councils, these are:

- Adalatgarh
- Ahmadpura
- Ballanwala
- Baonkan
- Bhagowal
- Bhagwal Awanan
- Bherath (Shahid Mehmood Sahi)
- Chaprar
- Charind
- Dalowali
- Doburji Araian
- Fathgarh
- Gohad Pur (Gohdpur)
- Gondal
- Gurhi
- Habibpura
- Hajipura
- Head Marala
- Hundal
- Imam Sahib
- Jurian Kalan
- Kachimand
- Kallowal
- Kammanwala
- Karimpura
- Kapurowali
- Kharota Sydan
- Kotli Behram
- Kotli Loharan
- Langreali (Muhammad Umar Langreall)
- Mianapura
- Miani (Buttar)
- Model Town
- Moh. Shah Syedan
- Momman Kalan
- Moonger
- Muhammad Pura
- Muzafferpur
- Naikapura
- Paragpur
- Phukalian
- Pindi Araian
- Pindi Khokhar
- Ploura Kalan
- Pura Heeran
- Rangpura
- Rasoolpur
- Roras
- Sheehani (Shadiwal)
- Shahabpura
- Syedanwali
- Talwara Mughlan
- Ugoki
- Vario
- Dera Sandha
- Water Works

== Demographics ==
=== Population ===
Historical population
Year	Pop.	±% p.a.
1951	...	—
1961	...	—
1972	...	—
1981	...	—
1998	1,207,744	—
2017	1,796,151	+2.11%
2023	2,088,201	+2.54%

According to the 2023 census, Sialkot Tehsil has a population of 2,088,201, with 1,139,321 residing in rural areas and 948,880 in urban areas. The tehsil encompasses 52 union councils and includes the city of Sialkot as its administrative center.The urban population of Sialkot city is 835,337, comprising 428,363 males and 406,499 females. Sialkot Tehsil covers an area of 901 square kilometers, resulting in a population density of approximately 2,314 people per square kilometer. The literacy rate in the district is 65%, indicating a significant emphasis on education.

== See also ==
- Tehsils of Pakistan
  - Tehsils of Punjab, Pakistan
  - Tehsils of Balochistan
  - Tehsils of Khyber Pakhtunkhwa
  - Tehsils of Sindh
  - Tehsils of Azad Kashmir
  - Tehsils of Gilgit-Baltistan
