= Yazman Tehsil =

Coordinates: 29°48′N 71°27′E

Yazman Tehsil تحصیل یزمان
- Tehsil
- Tehsil Municipal Administration logo

- Location of Yazman Tehsil in Punjab, Pakistan
- Country: Pakistan
- Province: (Punjab, Pakistan) Punjab
- District: Bahawalpur
- Capital: Yazman

Government
  - Type: Tehsil Municipal Administration
  - Administrator: Shakeel Ahmad
  - Municipal Officer: Muhammad Aslam Khan Khambrra

Area
  - Tehsil: 19,160 km^{2} (7,400 sq mi)

Population (2023)
  - Tehsil: 687,237
  - Density: 35.87/km^{2} (92.90/sq mi)
  - Urban: 60,738 (8.83%)
  - Rural: 626,499 (91.17%)

Literacy
  - Literacy rate (2023): 53.55%
- Time zone: UTC+5 (PST)
- Number of Union Councils: 18
- Website: TMA Yazman

Yazman (Urdu: تحصیل یزمان) is a tehsil located in Bahawalpur District, Punjab, Pakistan. The city of Yazman is the headquarters of the tehsil which is administratively subdivided into 18 union councils. With an area of 19,160 km square, it is the largest tehsil of the Punjab province.

== Demographics ==
=== Population ===
Historical population
Year	Pop.	±% p.a.
1951	52,802	—
1961	102,883	+6.90%
1972	154,506	+3.77%
1981	237,781	+4.91%
1998	405,787	+3.19%
2017	614,143	+2.21%
2023	687,237	+1.89%

Religion in Yazman tehsil (2023)
Religion	Percent
Islam	93.86%
Hinduism	5.42%
Christianity	0.54%
Other or not stated	0.18%

As of the 2023 census, Yazman Tehsil in Bahawalpur District has a population of 687,237, comprising 347,677 males, 339,483 females, and 77 transgender individuals. The sex ratio stands at 102.41 males for every 100 females.

The literacy rate in Yazman Tehsil is 53.55%, with 267,041 individuals aged 10 and above being literate.

Urban residents number 60,738, accounting for 8.84% of the population, while the remaining 91.16% reside in rural areas. The average household size is 6.3 persons.

Yazman is also the subdivision with the highest fraction of Hindus in Punjab province with 5.4% of the population.

=== Languages ===
Languages of Yazman Tehsil (2023)
1. Punjabi (57.4%)
2. Saraiki (35.9%)
3. Hindko (2.54%)
4. Others (4.12%)

The primary languages spoken are Punjabi (394,469 speakers) and Saraiki (246,539 speakers), followed by Hindko (17,449), Pushto (4,866), Balochi (1,693), and Urdu (1,667).

== See also ==
- Districts of Pakistan
  - Districts of Khyber Pakhtunkhwa, Pakistan
  - Districts of Punjab, Pakistan
  - Districts of Balochistan, Pakistan
  - Districts of Sindh, Pakistan
  - Districts of Azad Kashmir
  - Districts of Gilgit-Baltistan
- Divisions of Pakistan
  - Divisions of Balochistan
  - Divisions of Khyber Pakhtunkhwa
  - Divisions of Punjab
  - Divisions of Sindh
  - Divisions of Azad Kashmir
  - Divisions of Gilgit-Baltistan
