= Sialkot District =

District of Punjab, Pakistan

Coordinates: 32°31′12″N 74°33′00″E

Sialkot District ضلع سیالکوٹ
- District of Punjab
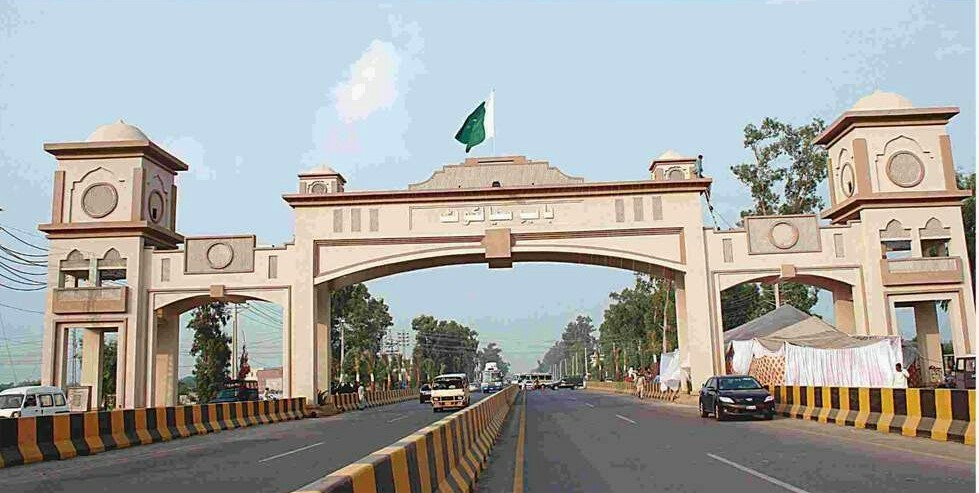
- Top: Bab-e-Sialkot (Gate of Sialkot); Bottom: Sialkot tower drone view

- Map of Sialkot District highlighted
- Country: Pakistan
- Province: Punjab
- Division: Gujranwala
- Established: 1852; 174 years ago
- Capital: Sialkot

Government
  - Type: District Administration
  - Deputy Commissioner: Sabah asghar
  - District Police Officer: Mr faisal
  - CEO Education: mujahid elvi

Area
  - District of Punjab: 3,016 km^{2} (1,164 sq mi)

Population (2023 Census of Pakistan)
  - District of Punjab: 4,499,394
  - Density: 1,492/km^{2} (3,864/sq mi)
  - Urban: 1,481,968 (32.94%)
  - Rural: 3,017,426 (67.06%)

Language(s)
  - Main language(s): Urdu, Punjabi

Literacy
  - Literacy rate: Total: (78.37%); Male: (80.24%); Female: (76.50%)
- Time zone: UTC+5 (PST)
- Area code: 052
- Number of Tehsils: 4
- Website: sialkot.punjab.gov.pk

Sialkot District (Note: Punjabi and Urdu: ضلع سیالکوٹ) is a district within the Gujranwala Division of Punjab, Pakistan. Located in northeastern Punjab, the city of Sialkot is the headquarters of the district. It houses the Sialkot Cantonment, established in 1852.

== Administration ==
The district is administratively divided into the following four tehsils (subdivisions), which contain a total of 122 Union Councils:

#	Tehsil	Area (km²)	Pop. (2023)	Density (ppl/km²) (2023)	Lit. rate (2023)	Union Councils
1	Pasrur	975	970,366	995.25	74.52%	28
2	Daska	690	980,547	1,421.08	79.19%	42
3	Sambrial	450	460,280	1,022.84	79.89%	30
4	Sialkot	901	2,088,201	2,317.65	79.42%	52

== History ==
Sialkot District was an agricultural region with forests during the Indus Valley Civilization. The Vedic period is characterized by Indo-Aryan culture that flourished in the Punjab region. The Kambojas, Daradas, Kaikayas, Madras, Pauravas, Yaudheyas, Malavas and Kurus invaded, settled and ruled the ancient Punjab region. After overrunning the Achaemenid Empire in 331 BCE, Alexander marched into the present-day Punjab region with an army of 50,000. The Sialkot was ruled by Maurya Empire, the Indo-Greek kingdom, Kushan Empire, Gupta Empire, White Huns, Kushano-Hephthalites, the Arabs and Hindu Shahi kingdoms.

In 997 CE, Sultan Mahmud Ghaznavi took over the Ghaznavid dynasty empire established by his father, Sultan Sebuktegin, In 1005 he conquered the Shahis in Kabul in 1005 CE and followed this by the conquests of the Punjab region. The Delhi Sultanate and later Mughal Empire ruled the region.

At an early date the District fell to the Mughal Empire, and under the Mughals formed the Rechna Doab sarkar of the Subah of Lahore. Under Shah Jahan the sarkar was entrusted to Ali Mardan Khan, the famous engineer, who dug a canal through it to bring water from the Chenab river to the imperial gardens in Lahore.

On the decline of the Mughal Empire Ranjit Singh Deo, a Rajput hill chief, extended his sway over the lowlands, owning a nominal allegiance to Delhi. In 1748 he transferred his allegiance to Ahmad Shah Durrani, who added Zafarwal and two other parganas to his fief. Before his death in 1773 Ranjit Deo had secured possession of the whole District, except the Sialkot town and its dependencies, which were held by a Pashtun family. Sialkot district was annexed by the British from its former Sikh rulers after the Second Anglo-Sikh War of 1848–1849.

During the Indian Rebellion of 1857 the station was denuded of British troops; and the Native regiments which were left behind the rose, and, after sacking the jail, treasury, and courthouse, and massacring several of the European inhabitants, marched off towards Delhi, only to be destroyed by Nicholson at Trimmu Ghat. The rest of the Europeans took refuge in the fort, and on the morning after the departure of the rebels order was restored. The only events of interest in the subsequent history of the District are the plague riots that occurred at the villages of Shahzada and Sankhatra in 1901.

Numerous mounds are scattered about the District, which marks the sites of ancient villages and towns. None of them, except that on which the Sialkot fort stood, has been excavated, but silver and copper utensils and coins have been dug up from time to time by villagers. Most of the coins are those of Indo-Bactrian kings. The excavations in Sialkot revealed the existence of some old baths, with hot-water pipes of solid masonry. The fort itself, of which very little now remains, is not more than 1,000 years old and is said to have been rebuilt by Shahab-ud-din Ghori at the end of the twelfth century.

In 1859, Gurdaspur, Amritsar and Sialkot were placed in the new division of Sialkot. But in 1884, Gurdaspur along with Amritsar again became a part of the Lahore Division.

According to the 1901 census, the district had a population of 1,083,909 and contained 7 towns and 2,348 villages. The population at the previous three enumerations was: 1,004,695 (1868), 1,012,148 (1881) and 1,119,847 (1891). The population decreased between 1891 and 1901 by 3.2, the decrease being greatest in the Raya tahsil and least in the Daska tahsil. The Chenab Colony was responsible for this fall in population, with no less than 103,000 persons having left to take land in the newly irrigated tracts.

The district was subdivided into five tehsils, namely: Sialkot, Pasrur, Zafarwal, Raya and Daska, the headquarters of each being at the place from which it is named. The chief towns of the district were Sialkot, Daska, Jamki, Pasrur, Kila Sobha Singh, Zafarwal and Narowal.

Tehsil	Area (sq mi)	Towns	Villages	Population (1901)	Population per sq mi	Population variation 1891–1901	Number of literate people
Sialkot	428	1	637	312,668	730.5	+3.2	12,101
Pasrur	394	2	443	193,746	491.7	−5.0	5,601
Sambrial	485	1	456	192,440	396.8	+10.4	5,586
Daska	360	2	332	206,148	572.6	−0.6	4,103
Total	1,991	7	2,348	1,083,909	544.4	−3.2	31,341

In 1930, the tehsils of Raya, Daska and Pasrur were split up and parts of these were amalgamated into Gujranwala District. In 1991, the tehsils of Narowal and Shakar Garh (which was tehsil Shankar Garh of Gurdaspur district before the independence of Pakistan in 1947) were split up and formed into the new Narowal District.

== Geography ==
Sialkot District lies southeast of Gujrat District, southwest of Jammu district (in Indian-administered Jammu and Kashmir), while Narowal District is to the southeast and Gujranwala District is situated to the west.

Sialkot district is spread over an area of 3,016 square kilometers.

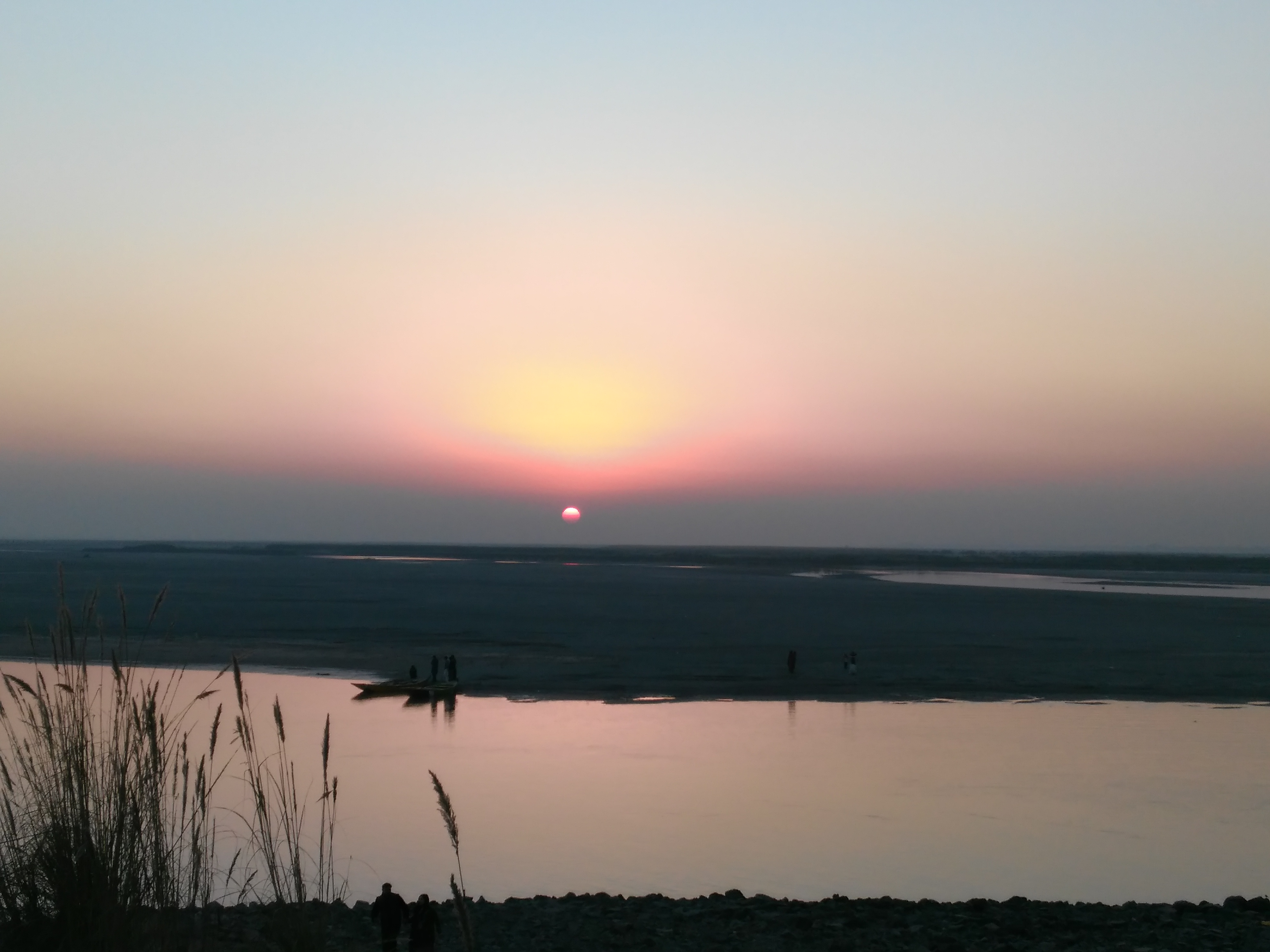
Sunset at Head Marala

Sialkot is hot and humid during the summer and cold during the winter. June and July are the hottest months. The maximum temperature during winter may drop to −2 °C (28 °F). The land is generally plain and fertile. The average annual rainfall is about 1000 mm. Over 25.82% of the population of the district is urban.

== Demographics ==
=== Population ===
Historical population
Year	Pop.	±% p.a.
1951	961,721	—
1961	1,045,958	+0.84%
1972	1,509,424	+3.39%
1981	1,802,505	+1.99%
1998	2,723,481	+2.46%
2017	3,894,938	+1.90%
2023	4,499,394	+2.43%

As of the 2023 census, Sialkot district has 671,320 households and a population of 4,499,394. The district has a sex ratio of 102.58 males to 100 females and a literacy rate of 78.37%: 80.24% for males and 76.50% for females. 1,116,259 (24.96% of the surveyed population) are under 10 years of age. 1,481,968 (32.94%) live in urban areas.

=== Religion ===
Religion in Sialkot district (2023)
Religion	Percent
Islam	96.19%
Christianity	3.46%
Others	0.35%

Muslims are the majority community making up 96.19% of the population, while Christians (descendants of Hindu Dalits who converted during the British Colonial period) are the principal minority.

Religion in contemporary Sialkot District
Religious group	1941		2017		2023	
Religious group	Pop.	%	Pop.	%	Pop.	%
Islam	592,236	64.17%	3,740,507	96.04%	4,302,067	96.19%
Hinduism	176,989	19.18%	2,870	0.07%	3,195	0.07%
Sikhism	92,715	10.05%	—N/a	—N/a	260	~0%
Christianity	54,498	5.91%	136,254	3.50%	154,884	3.46%
Ahmadi	—N/a	—N/a	14,771	0.38%	11,386	0.25%
Others	6,461	0.7%	536	0.01%	668	0.01%
Total Population	922,899	100%	3,894,938	100%	4,472,462	100%
Note: 1941 census data is for Sialkot, Daska and Pasrur tehsils of Sialkot district, which roughly corresponds to contemporary Sialkot district. District and tehsil borders have changed since 1941.

Religious groups in Sialkot District (British Punjab province era)
Religious group	1881		1891		1901		1911		1921		1931		1941	
Religious group	Pop.	%	Pop.	%	Pop.	%	Pop.	%	Pop.	%	Pop.	%	Pop.	%
Islam	669,712	66.17%	685,342	61.2%	716,953	66.15%	604,801	61.74%	580,532	61.9%	609,633	62.23%	739,218	62.09%
Hinduism (Note: 1931–1941: Including Ad-Dharmis)	299,311	29.57%	371,265	33.15%	302,012	27.86%	242,325	24.74%	217,912	23.24%	206,421	21.07%	231,319	19.43%
Sikhism	40,195	3.97%	49,872	4.45%	50,982	4.7%	81,761	8.35%	74,939	7.99%	94,955	9.69%	139,409	11.71%
Christianity	1,535	0.15%	11,668	1.04%	11,939	1.1%	48,620	4.96%	62,266	6.64%	66,365	6.77%	75,831	6.37%
Jainism	1,388	0.14%	1,696	0.15%	2,008	0.19%	2,029	0.21%	2,147	0.23%	2,236	0.23%	3,250	0.27%
Zoroastrianism	7	0%	4	0%	9	0%	17	0%	27	0%	7	0%	14	0%
Buddhism	0	0%	0	0%	6	0%	0	0%	0	0%	0	0%	3	0%
Judaism	—N/a	—N/a	0	0%	0	0%	0	0%	0	0%	0	0%	0	0%
Others	0	0%	0	0%	0	0%	0	0%	0	0%	0	0%	1,453	0.12%
Total population	1,012,148	100%	1,119,847	100%	1,083,909	100%	979,553	100%	937,823	100%	979,617	100%	1,190,497	100%
Note1: British Punjab province era district borders are not an exact match in the present-day due to various bifurcations to district borders – which since created new districts – throughout the historic Punjab Province region during the post-independence era that have taken into account population increases. Note2: Population decrease between 1901 and 1921 census due to large population migrations south to newly created tehsils and districts in the Chenab Canal Colony.

Religion in the Tehsils of Sialkot District (1921)
Tehsil	Islam		Hinduism		Sikhism		Christianity		Jainism		Others (Note: Including Buddhism, Zoroastrianism, Judaism, Tribals, others, or not stated)		Total	
Tehsil	Pop.	%	Pop.	%	Pop.	%	Pop.	%	Pop.	%	Pop.	%	Pop.	%
Sialkot Tehsil	175,385	60.38%	85,711	29.51%	11,679	4.02%	16,195	5.58%	1,472	0.51%	27	0.01%	290,469	100%
Pasrur Tehsil	89,067	63.26%	26,615	18.9%	13,360	9.49%	11,395	8.09%	351	0.25%	0	0%	140,788	100%
Zafarwal Tehsil	97,303	61.22%	50,361	31.69%	6,192	3.9%	5,000	3.15%	80	0.05%	0	0%	158,936	100%
Raya Tehsil	119,705	60.78%	29,847	15.16%	29,293	14.87%	17,919	9.1%	172	0.09%	0	0%	196,936	100%
Daska Tehsil	99,072	65.74%	25,378	16.84%	14,415	9.57%	11,757	7.8%	72	0.05%	0	0%	150,694	100%
Note: British Punjab province era tehsil borders are not an exact match in the present-day due to various bifurcations to tehsil borders – which since created new tehsils – throughout the historic Punjab Province region during the post-independence era that have taken into account population increases.

Religion in the Tehsils of Sialkot District (1941)
Tehsil	Islam		Hinduism		Sikhism		Christianity		Jainism		Others (Note: Including Anglo-Indian Christians, British Christians, Buddhism, Zoroastrianism, Judaism, Tribals, others, or not stated)		Total	
Tehsil	Pop.	%	Pop.	%	Pop.	%	Pop.	%	Pop.	%	Pop.	%	Pop.	%
Sialkot Tehsil	241,505	61.49%	104,090	26.5%	25,306	6.44%	17,080	4.35%	2,797	0.71%	1,986	0.51%	392,764	100%
Pasrur Tehsil	166,519	66.23%	44,059	17.52%	26,031	10.35%	13,250	5.27%	110	0.04%	1,455	0.58%	251,424	100%
Narowal Tehsil	146,982	54.93%	54,330	20.3%	46,694	17.45%	19,348	7.23%	240	0.09%	4	0%	267,598	100%
Daska Tehsil	184,212	66.09%	28,840	10.35%	41,378	14.85%	24,168	8.67%	103	0.04%	10	0%	278,711	100%
Note1: British Punjab province era tehsil borders are not an exact match in the present-day due to various bifurcations to tehsil borders – which since created new tehsils – throughout the historic Punjab Province region during the post-independence era that have taken into account population increases. Note2: Tehsil religious breakdown figures for Christianity only includes local Christians, labeled as "Indian Christians" on census. Does not include Anglo-Indian Christians or British Christians, who were classified under "Other" category.

=== Language ===
Languages of Sialkot district (2023)
1. Punjabi (92.0%)
2. Urdu (4.86%)
3. Mewati (1.27%)
4. Pashto (1.22%)
5. Others (0.64%)

At the time of the 2023 census, 92.01% of the population spoke Punjabi, 4.86% Urdu, 1.27% Mewati and 1.22% Pashto as their first language.

== Educational Institutes ==
There are one main public university and one medical college in Sialkot

- Government College Women University Sialkot
- Khawaja Muhammad Safdar Medical College

There are two private universities and two private medical college

- University of Sialkot
- Grand Asian University Sialkot
- Islam Medical & Dental College
- Sialkot Medical College

Besides these institutions there are many small institution providing education in District Sialkot

== Notable people ==
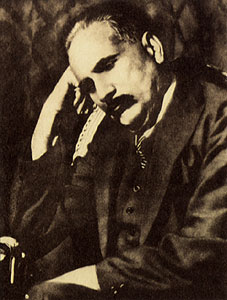
Allama Iqbal

=== Historical figures ===
- Allama Iqbal, poet and philosopher
- Abdul Hakim Sialkoti, a 16th century Mughal-era Islamic scholar
- Muhammad Ibrahim Mir Sialkoti, Islamic religious scholar and activist of Pakistan Movement
- Nizam al-Din 'Ishrat Sialkoti, 18th-century historian, judge, panegyrist, and a court poet of Ahmad Shah Durrani from Sialkot
- Faiz Ahmad Faiz, (Note: Now in Narowal District) poet and scholar
- Syed Faiz-ul Hassan Shah, great orator, poet and pir, has been president of Jamiat Ulema-e-Pakistan
- Zafar Ali Khan writer, poet, and journalist who played an important role in the Pakistan Movement
- Sir Fazl-i-Hussain was one of the most Influential politicians in the United Punjab
- Ubaidullah Sindhi pre-partition Muslim Scholar and leader
- Chaudhry Naseer Ahmad Malhi a leading member of the Muslim League
- Chaudhry Sir Shahab-ud-Din Virk, lawyer and politician in pre-partition.

=== Military ===
- Air marshal Zafar Chaudhry was the first Chief of Air Staff
- General Khalid Shameem Wynne the 14th Chairman of the Joint Chiefs of Staff Committee

=== Journalists and poets ===
- Kuldip Nayar, Indian journalist
- Amjad Islam Amjad, Urdu writer, lyricist, and poet
- Rajinder Singh Bedi, writer
- Khalid Hasan, who was born in Srinagar but studied and lived in Sialkot.
- Hamid Mir, a Pakistani journalist who was born in Sialkot
- Abdal Bela, Urdu writer
- Taufiq Rafat, a British-Pakistani poet

=== Politicians ===
- Gulzarilal Nanda, former acting Indian Prime Minister
- Akhtar Ali Vario former Provincial Minister of Punjab, Chairman District Council Sialkot
- Chaudhry Amir Hussain, former Speaker of Pakistan National Assembly, former acting President of Pakistan and Federal Minister of Pakistan 3 times
- Khawaja Muhammad Safdar, Pakistani politician and former acting President of Pakistan
- Syed Iftikhar Ul Hassan, Politician from Allo Mahar, re-elected several time as a Member of the National Assembly.
- Khawaja Muhammad Asif, politician and Federal Minister of Pakistan
- Firdous Ashiq Awan, former Federal Minister
- Choudhary Khush Akhtar Subhani, former Provincial Minister of Punjab
- Armaghan Subhani, Minister of State For Planning & Development, former Provincial Minister of Punjab
- Sir Muhammad Zafarullah Khan, Pakistan's first Foreign Minister and President of the United Nations General Assembly

=== Businesspersons ===
- Khawaja Masood Akhtar, businessperson
- Malik Riaz, Businessperson and founder of Bahria Town
- Usman Dar, politician and businessperson

=== Scholars ===
- Pervaiz Iqbal Cheema, political scientist

=== Artists ===
- Waheed Murad, Pakistani film actor
- Rajender Kumar, Indian film actor
- A. K. Hangal, Indian film actor
- Ghulam Ali, ghazal singer
- Bilal Saeed, a Punjabi language singer and songwriter

=== Sportsmen ===
- Shoaib Malik, former captain of Pakistani cricket team
- Abdullah Shafique, Pakistani cricketer
- Ijaz Ahmed, cricketer, played for Pakistan national cricket team.
- Zaheer Abbas, Pakistani cricketer
- Abdul Rahman, Pakistani cricketer
- Shahnaz Sheikh, Pakistan national hockey team player
- Mansoor Amjad, Zahid Fazal, Pakistan national cricket team players.
- Sikandar Raza, Zimbabwean cricket player
- Jawaid Iqbal, Hong Kong national cricket player
- Nasir Ali, Pakistan national hockey team player
- Asif Bajwa, Pakistan national hockey team player
- Tariq Sheikh, Pakistan national hockey team player
- Muhammad Waqas, Pakistan national hockey team player
- Mahmood Hussain, Pakistan national hockey team player
- Maqsood Hussain, Pakistan national hockey team player
- Munir Bhatti, Pakistan national hockey team player
- Kamran Ashraf, Pakistan national hockey team player
- Haris Sohail, Pakistani cricketer
- Mukhtar Ahmed, Pakistani cricketer

=== Others ===
- Chaudhry Abdul Jalil, also known as Chacha Cricket

== See also ==
- Sialkot
- List of districts in Pakistan
- List of cities in Punjab, Pakistan by population
