= List of people from Sialkot =

This list includes notable people from Sialkot, Pakistan.

== Islamic scholars and saints ==
- Abdul Hakim Sialkoti, Islamic scholar
- Ehsan Elahi Zaheer, Pakistani Islamic scholar; founder of Jamiat Ahle Hadith Pakistan
- Imam Ali-ul-Haq, Islamic Sufi warrior-saint, known for converting Sialkot into a largely Muslim city in the 13th Century
- Syed Mir Hassan, Islamic religious scholar and teacher of Muhammad Iqbal
- Syed Faiz-ul Hassan Shah, Islamic religious scholar
- Peer Jamaat Ali Shah, Islamic scholar and proponent of Pakistan Movement
- Muhammad Ibrahim Mir Sialkoti, Islamic religious scholar and activist of Pakistan Movement
- Faiz-ul Hassan Shah, Pakistani Islamic scholar
- Khalid Hasan Shah, Islamic Naqshbandi scholar
- Muhammad Jewan Shah Naqvi, Islamic Naqshbani saint
- Muhammad Channan Shah Nuri, Islamic scholar and saint of the Naqashbandi order
- Muhammad Amin Shah Sani, Islamic Naqshbandi scholar
- Muhammad Hussain Shah Salis, Islamic Naqshbandi Saint
- Ziauddin Madani, Islamic Scholar

== Poets ==
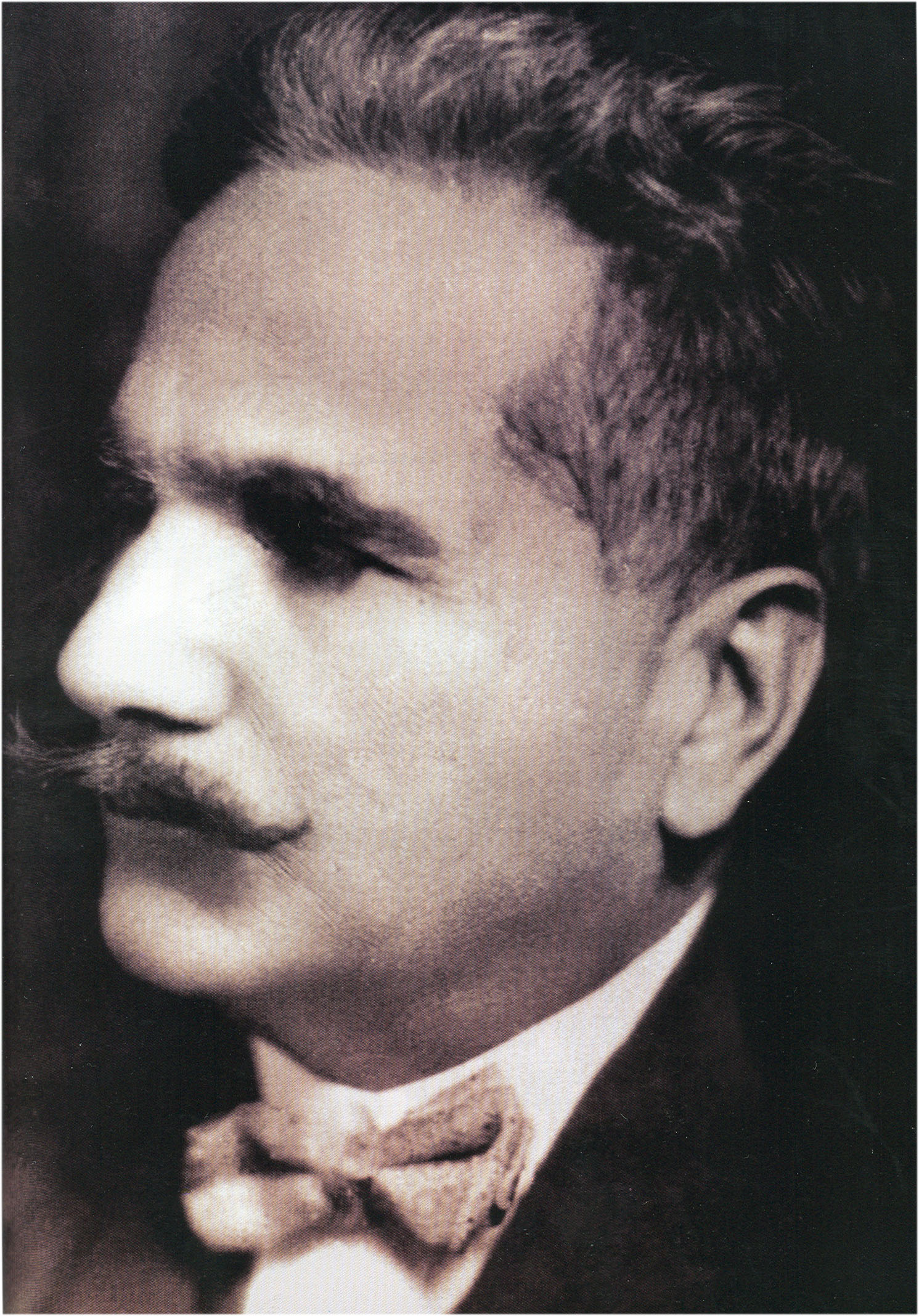
Dr Allama Iqbal

- Dr Allama Muhammad Iqbal — Islamic philosopher, thinker, poet (Persian, Urdu) and one of the leading figures of the Pakistan Movement
- Asghar Sodai — poet and creator of the phrase "Pakistan Ka Matlab Kya La Ilaha Illallah"
- Khawaja Shahudin — Islamic Qadiri poet
- Nizam al-Din 'Ishrat Sialkoti, 18th-century historian, judge, panegyrist, and a court poet of Ahmad Shah Durrani from Sialkot
- Taufiq Rafat — poet

== Aviators ==
- M. A. Rahman, former Chief of Staff of the PAF, Air Vice Marshal and among the pioneers of the Pakistan Air Force
- Squadron Leader Muhammad Iqbal, killed in the 1965 War

== Politicians ==
- Akhtar Ali Vario
- Choudhary Khush Akhtar Subhani
- Armaghan Subhani
- Tariq Subhani
- Naseer Ahmad Malhi
- Mumtaz Kahloon
- Khawaja Asif, politician and banker
- Usman Dar, Politician and businessman
- Gulzari Lal Nanda, politician and economist,
- Chaudhry Amir Hussain, politician
- Khawaja Muhammad Safdar
- Rehman Malik, politician
- Mushahid Hussain Syed
- Firdous Ashiq Awan

== Athletes ==
- Zahid Sheikh, hockey player
- Shahnaz Sheikh, hockey player
- Shoaib Malik, cricketer
- Zaheer Abbas, cricketer
- Zahid Fazal, cricketer
- Shaiman Anwar, cricketer
- Sikandar Raza, Zimbabwean cricketer, born in Sialkot
- Mohammad Abbas, cricketer
- Raza Hasan, cricketer
- Mukhtar Ahmed, cricketer
- Asif Bajwa, hockey player
- Haris Sohail, cricketer
- Bilal Asif, cricketer
- Bilawal Bhatti, cricketer
- Ijaz Ahmed, cricketer
- Ijaz Butt, former PCB Chairman
- Nasir Ali, hockey player
- Tariq Sheikh, hockey player
- Qaiser Abbas, cricketer
- Mansoor Amjad, cricketer
- Shakeel Ansar, cricketer
- Junaid Siddique, Bangladeshi cricketer

== Actors and filmmakers ==
- Rajendra Kumar, Bollywood film actor
- AK Hangal, Bollywood film actor
- Waheed Murad, Lollywood film actor
- O. P. Ralhan, Bollywood producer, director, writer, actor
- J. Om Prakash, Bollywood producer and director

== Businesspeople ==
- Dharampal Gulati, founder of Mahashian Di Hatti (MDH) spice company and several charitable schools and hospitals in Delhi
- Malik Riaz, a Pakistani businessman, founder of Bahria Town
