= List of Naqshbandi saints from Allo Mahar =

Below is a list of Naqshbandi saints who either hail from or have their shrines in the village of Allo Mahar in Punjab, Pakistan.

- Syed Muhammad Jewan Shah Naqvi (Bhaakri)
- Pir Syed Muhammad Channan Shah Nuri (Naqvi Bhaakri)
- Pir Muhammad Amin Shah Sani Sarkar
- Pir Syed Muhammad Hussain Shah Salis Sarkar
- Pir Syed Faiz-ul Hassan Shah
- Pir Syed Khalid Hasan Shah

== Gallery ==
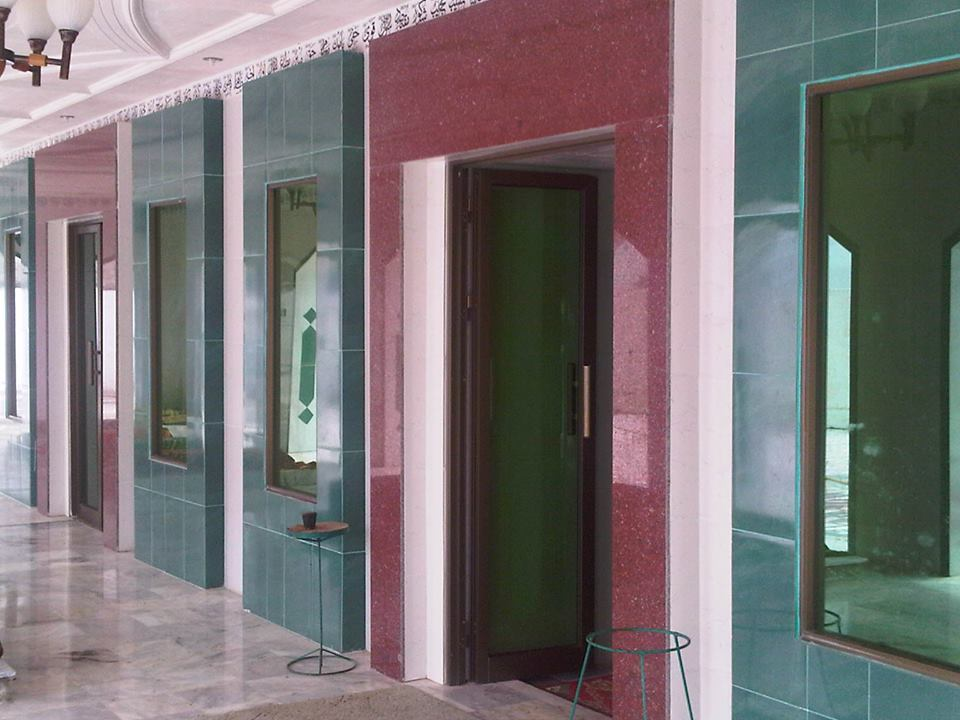
Entrance of the tomb of Muhammad Channan Shah Nuri in Allo Mahar, Sialkot

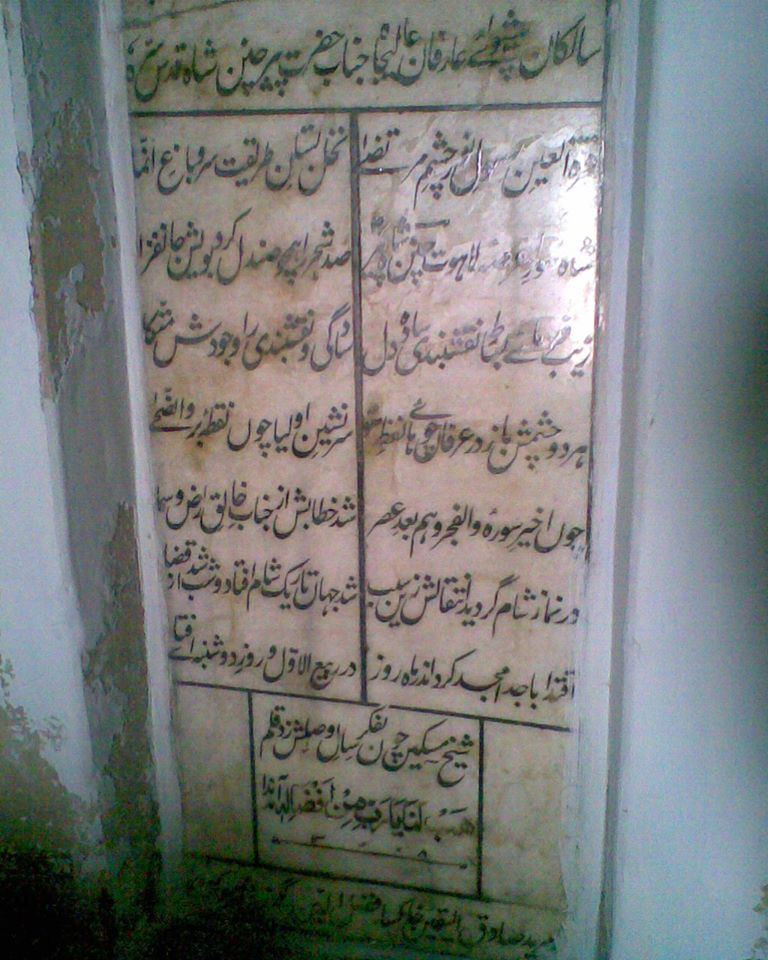
Persian lines written on gravestone of Muhammad Channan Shah Nuri

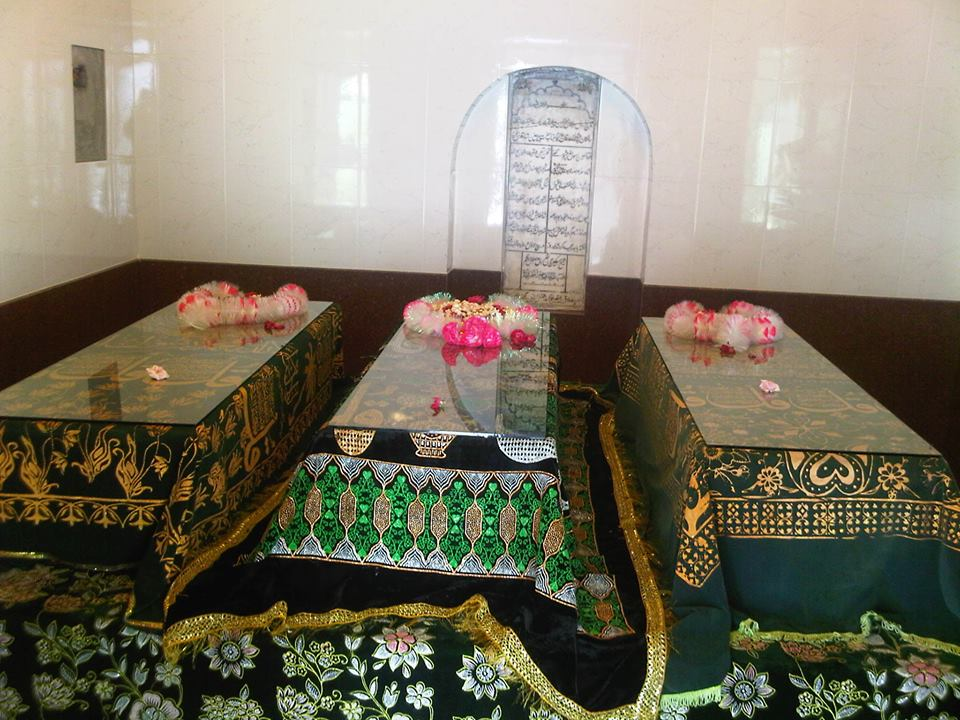
Graves of Muhammad Channan Shah Nuri, Muhammad Amin Shah Sani, Syed Muhammad Hussain Shah from right to left

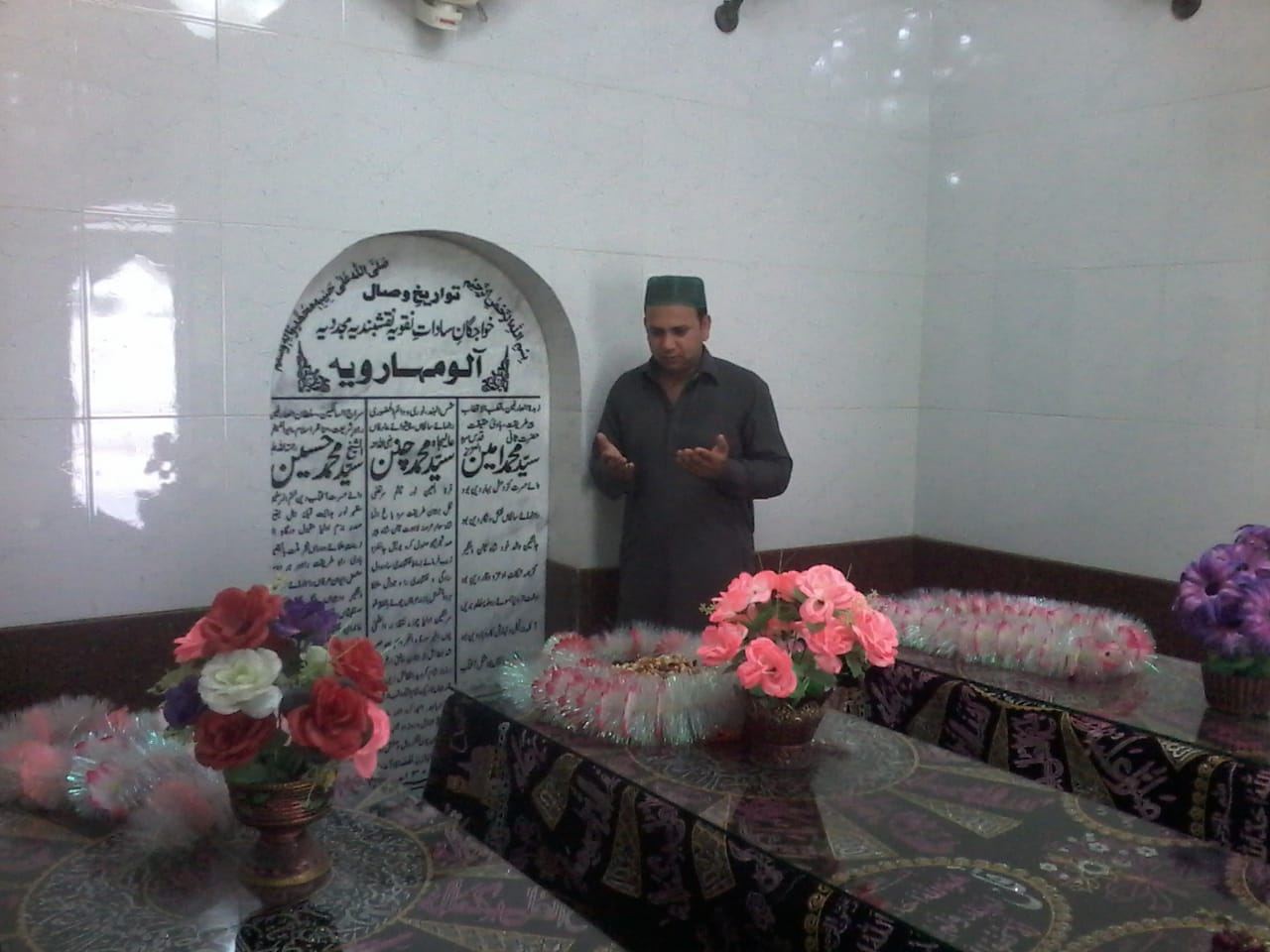
A visitor praying Al Fateha at the graves of tomb of Allo Mahar Shreef

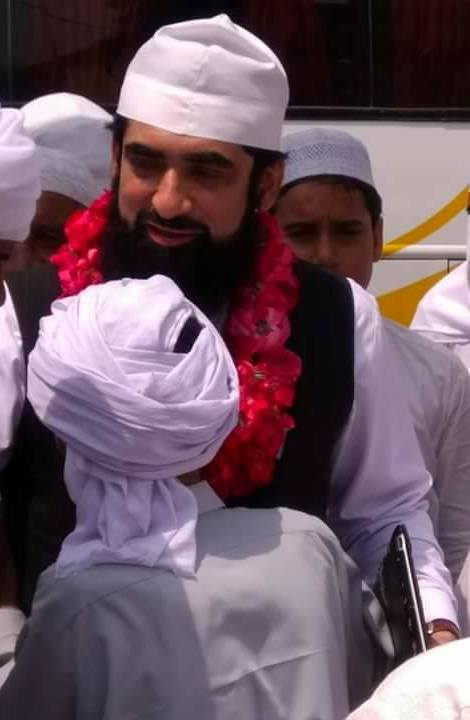
Syed Murtaza Amin Shah, leader of Naqshbandia Mujdadia Aminia, meeting with his followers

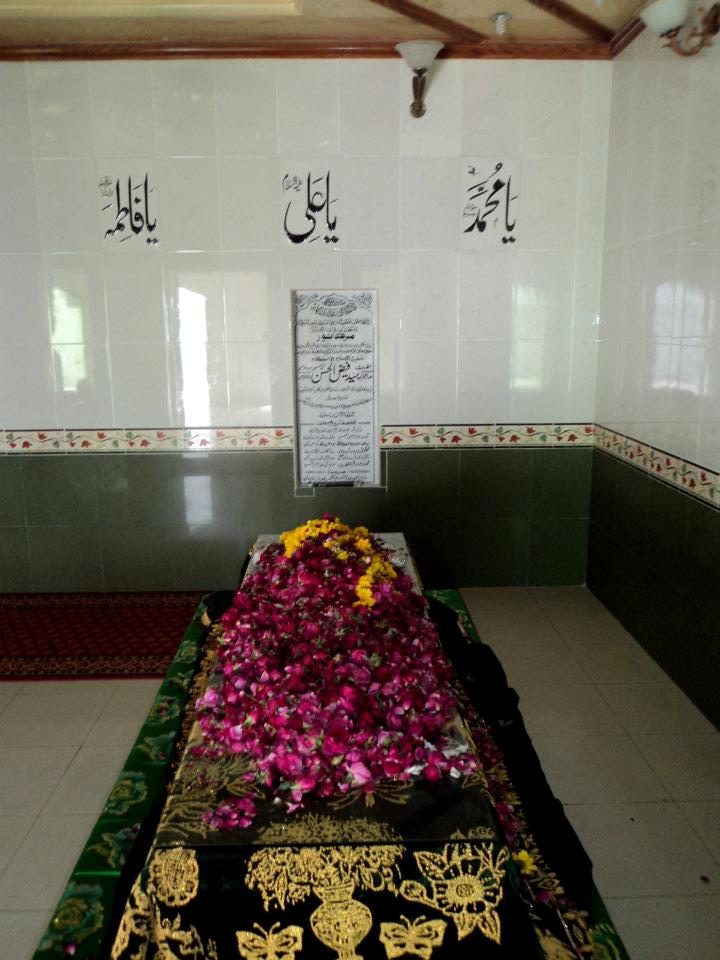
Grave of Syed Faiz ul Hasan Shah

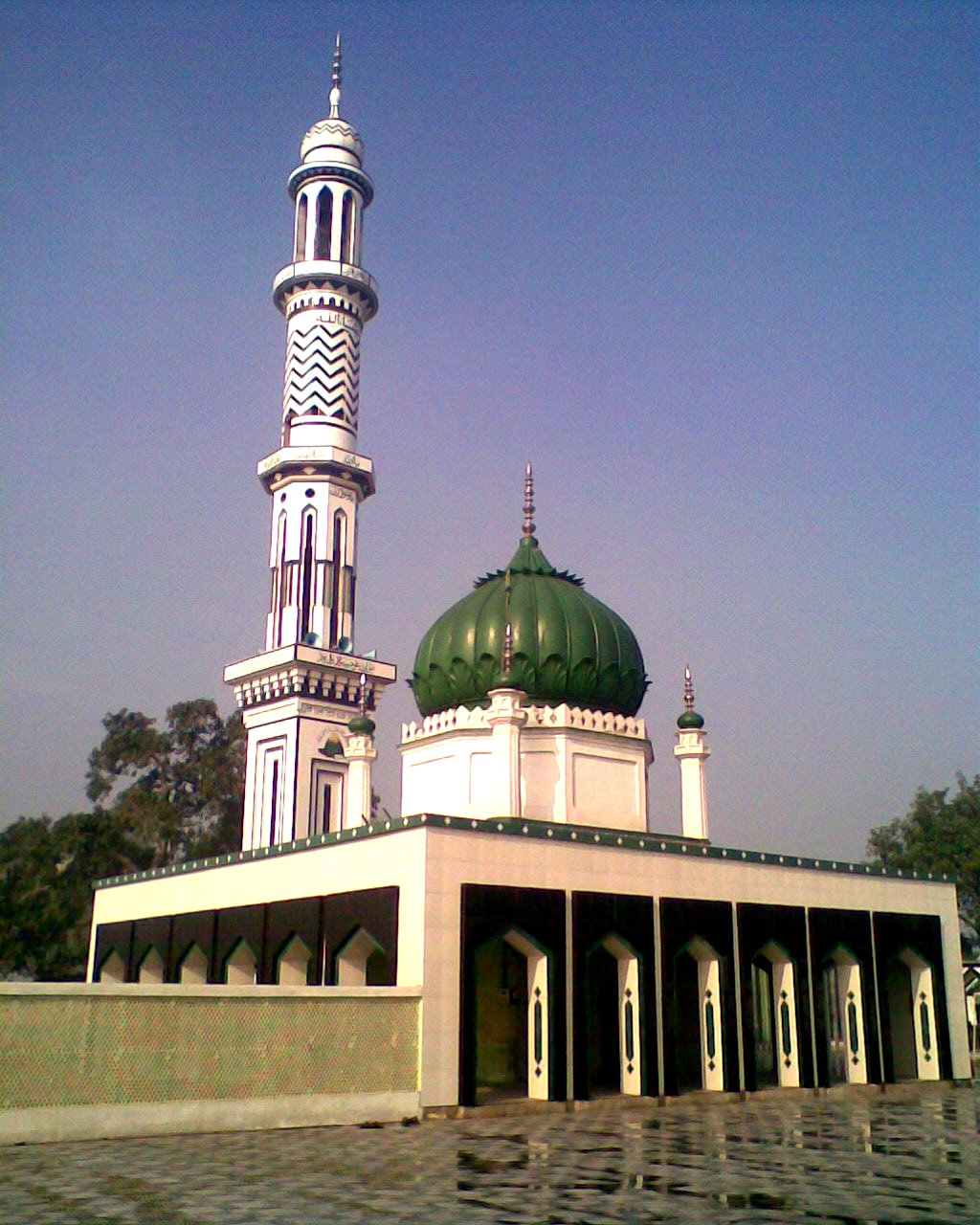
Tomb of Syed Faiz-ul Hassan Shah and Muhammad Amin Shah Sani in Allo Mahar, Sialkot

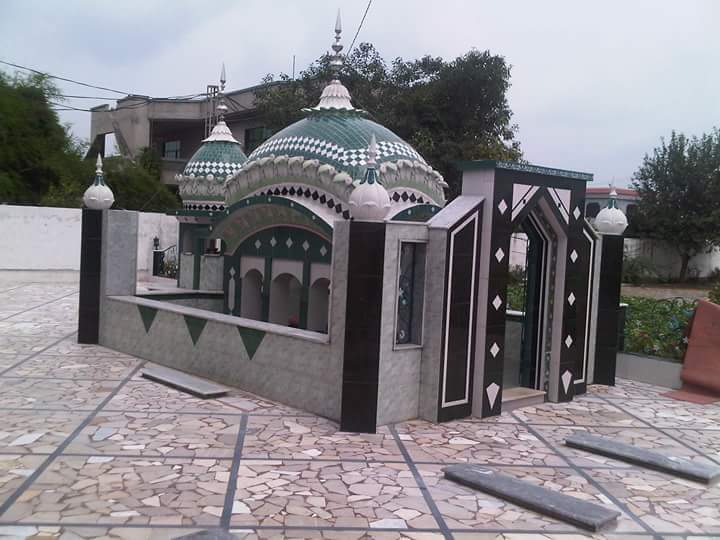
Tomb of Syed Muhammad Jewan Shah Naqvi in Allo Mahar, Sialkot

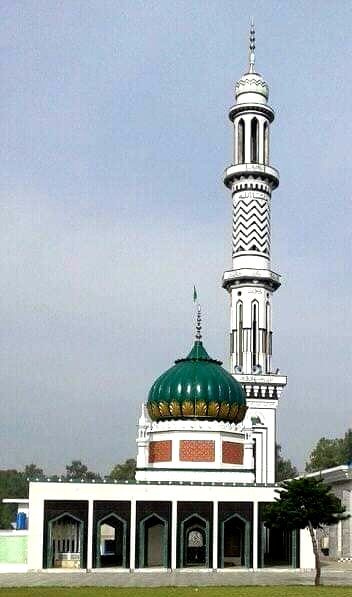
Another view of Allo Mahar shrine

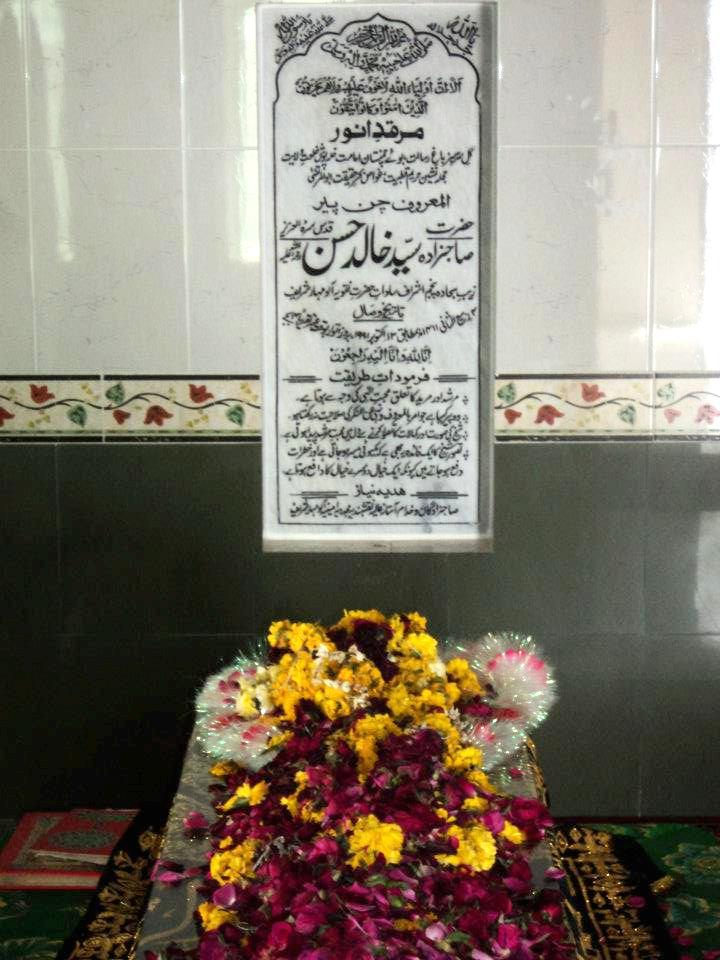
Grave of Syed Khalid Hassan Shah

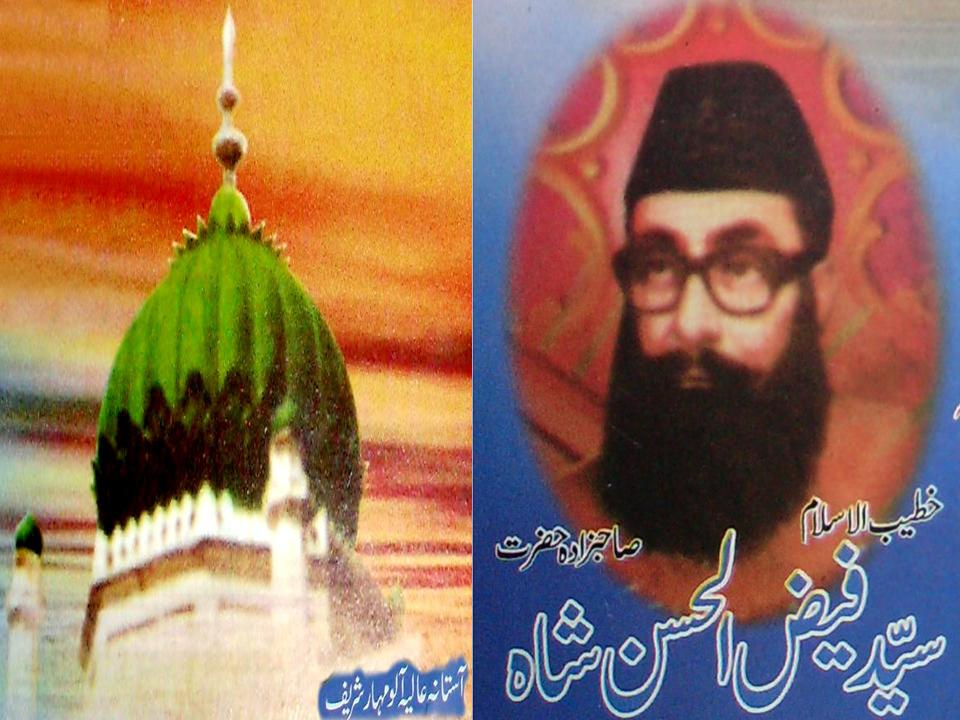
Former president of Jamiat ulama e Pakistan

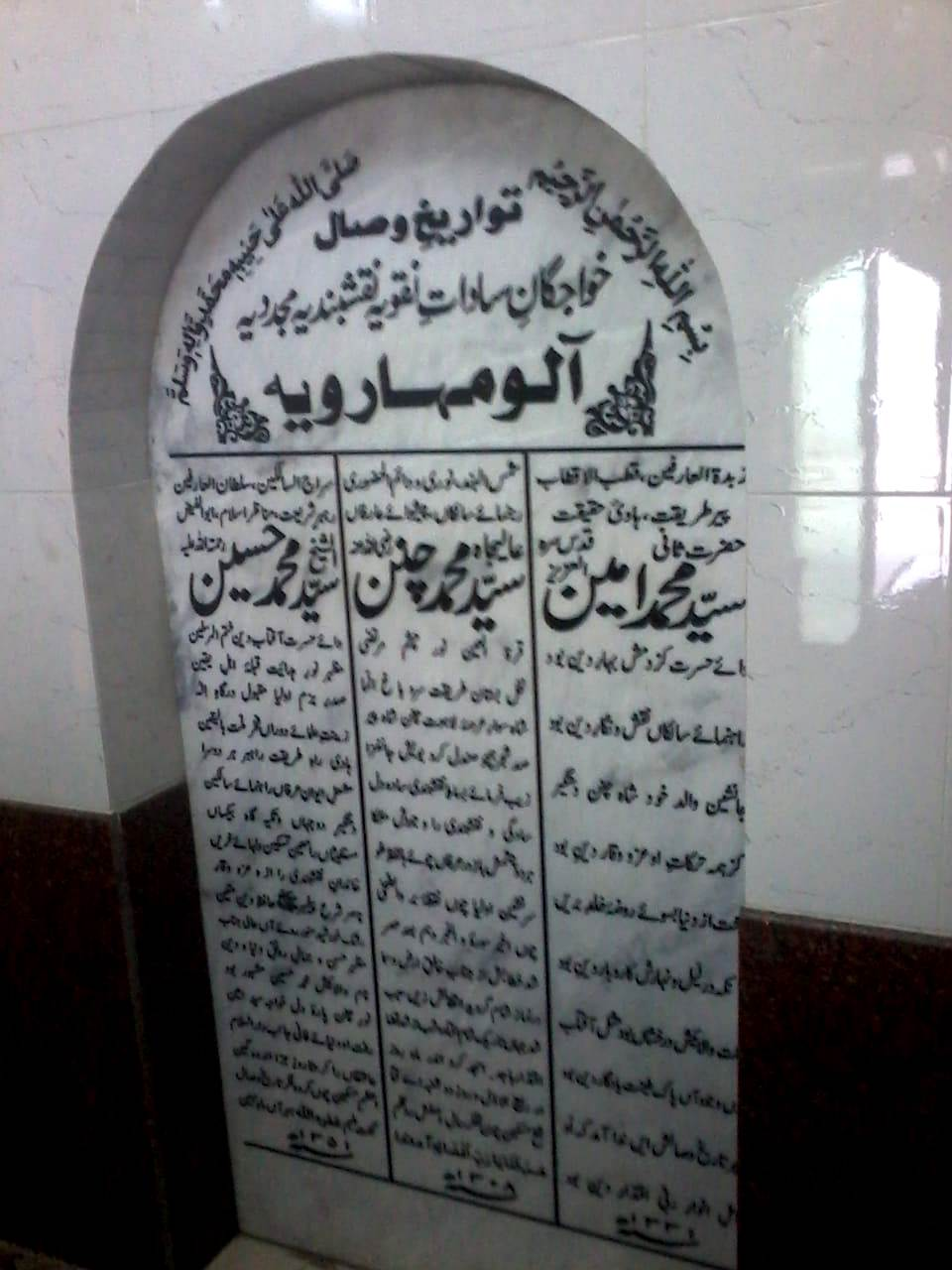
Gravestone with date of death and lines in Persian language

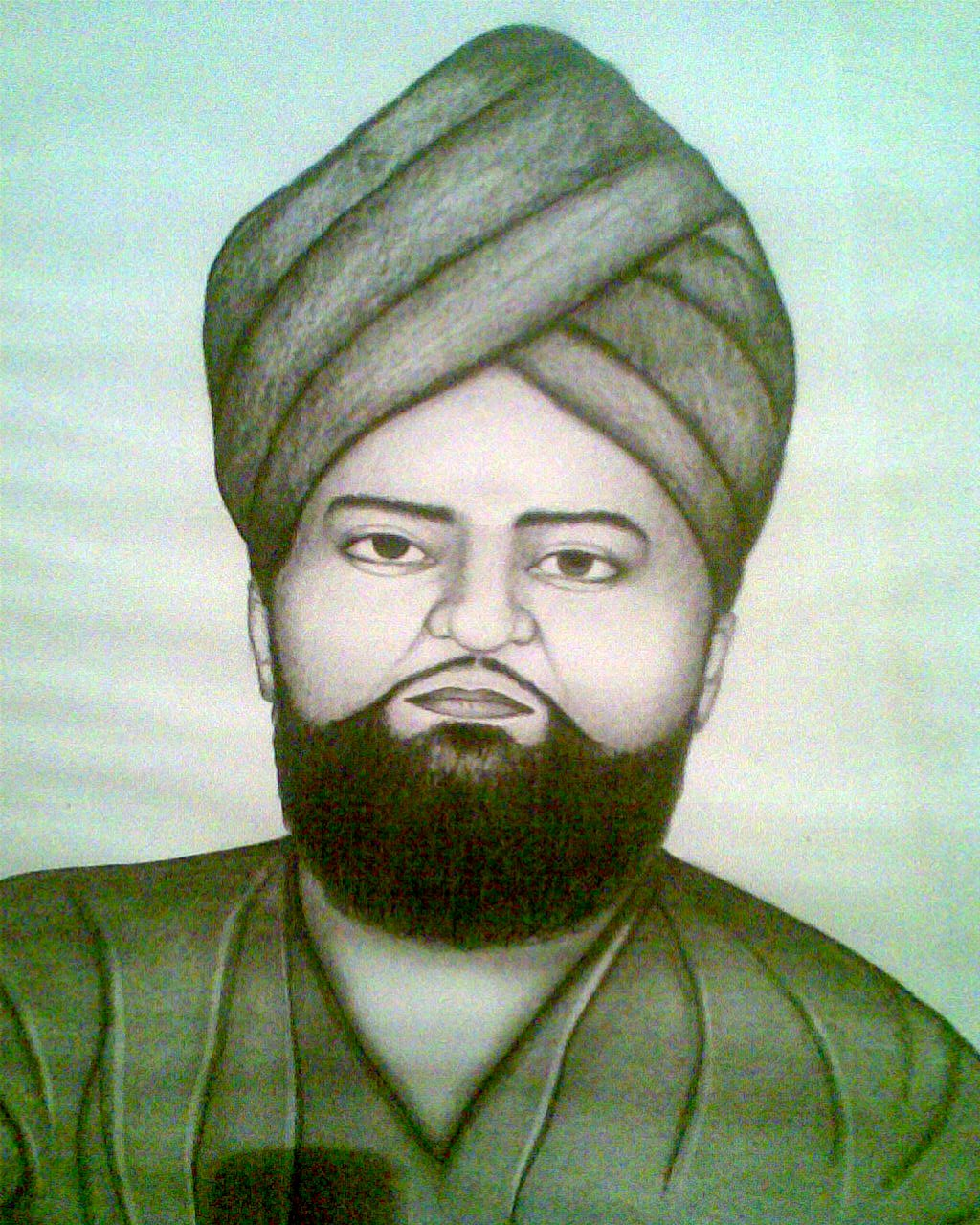
Handmade sketch of Pir Syed Muhammad Hussain Shah

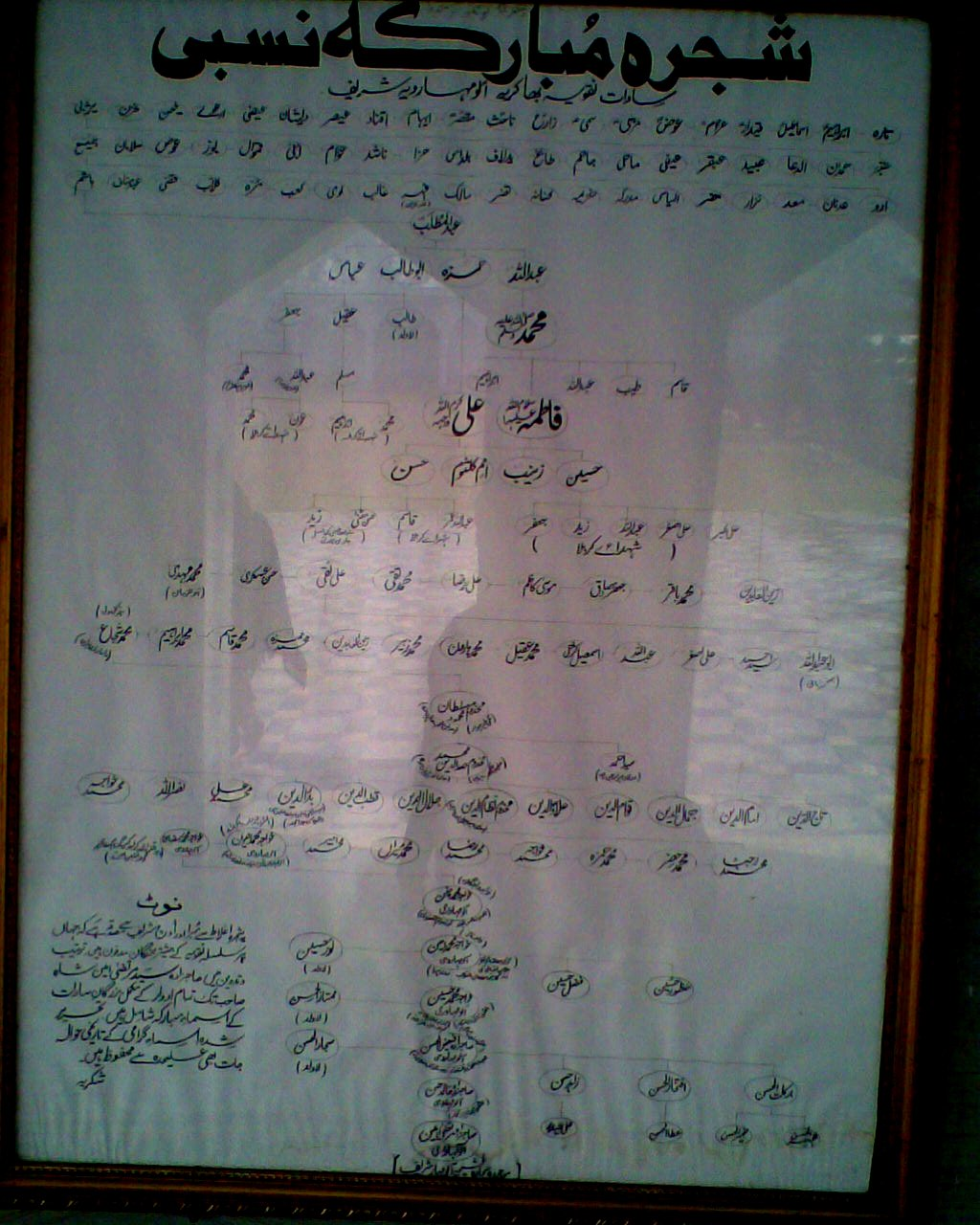
Family tree of Syed Naqvi family of allo mahar Shrif. Pir Syed Muhammad Jewan Shah Naqvi, founder of Allo mahar sharif, great-grandson of emperor of Kharasan.
