= Sufi lodge =

Building for gatherings of a Sufi brotherhood

A Sufi lodge (Note: Sometimes also called Sufi monastery or Sufi convent.) is a building designed specifically for gatherings of a Sufi brotherhood or tariqa and is a place for spiritual practice and religious education. They include structures also known as khānaqāh, zāwiya, ribāṭ, dargāh and takya depending on the region, language and period (see § Terminology). In Shia Islam, the Husayniyya has a similar function.

The Sufi lodge is typically a large structure with a central hall and smaller rooms on either side. Traditionally, the Sufi lodge was state-sponsored housing for Sufis. Their primary function is to provide them with a space to practice social lives of asceticism. Buildings intended for public services, such as hospitals, kitchens, and lodging, are often attached to them. Sufi lodges were funded by Ayyubid Sultans in Syria, Zangid Sultans in Egypt, and Delhi Sultans in India in return for Sufi support of their governments.

== Terminology ==
Sufi lodges were called by various names depending on period, location and language: mostly, khānaqāh, zāwiya, ribāṭ, dargāh and takya.

The word khānaqāh (Classical Persian: خانَگاه, romanized: xānagāh or خانَقاه, xānaqāh; Arabic: خَانَقَاه, romanized: khānaqāh; Azerbaijani: xanəqah; Ottoman Turkish: خانَقاه, romanized: hanekâh; Urdu: خانَقاہ, romanized: khānaqāh; Uzbek: xonaqoh) is likely either Turkish or Persian in origin.

The words zāwiya (Arabic: زَاوِيَة; plural زَوَايَا, zawāyā) and ribāṭ (Arabic: رِبَاط; plural: رُبُط, rubuṭ) were especially used in the Maghreb. The literal meaning of zāwiya is 'corner', while ribāṭ means 'frontier guardpost'.

The Classical Persian word دَرگاه dargāh means 'doorway; shrine'.

The Classical Persian word تَکْیه takya (whence modern Iranian Persian: تَکْیه, romanized: takye; Azerbaijani: təkyə; Panjabi: تَکْیہ, romanized: takya; Urdu: تَکْیہ, romanized: takya; Uzbek: takya) at its core meant "support"; also "cushion" or "pillow". (Note: Other words were derived from تَکْیه takya in Classical Persian, such as تکیه‌نشین takya-nishīn and تکیه‌دار takya-dār both meaning a Sufi.) The word was also borrowed in Ottoman Turkish as تَكْیه tekye (modern Turkish: tekke), and in languages of the Balkans (Albanian: teqeja; Bosnian: tekija). While in Arabic as تَكِيَّة takiyya (plural تَكَايَا takāyā), refers to an institution established to serve pilgrims and the poor, providing communal meals through a soup kitchen as well as residential accommodation. It corresponds broadly to the modern Turkish: külliye.

== Function ==
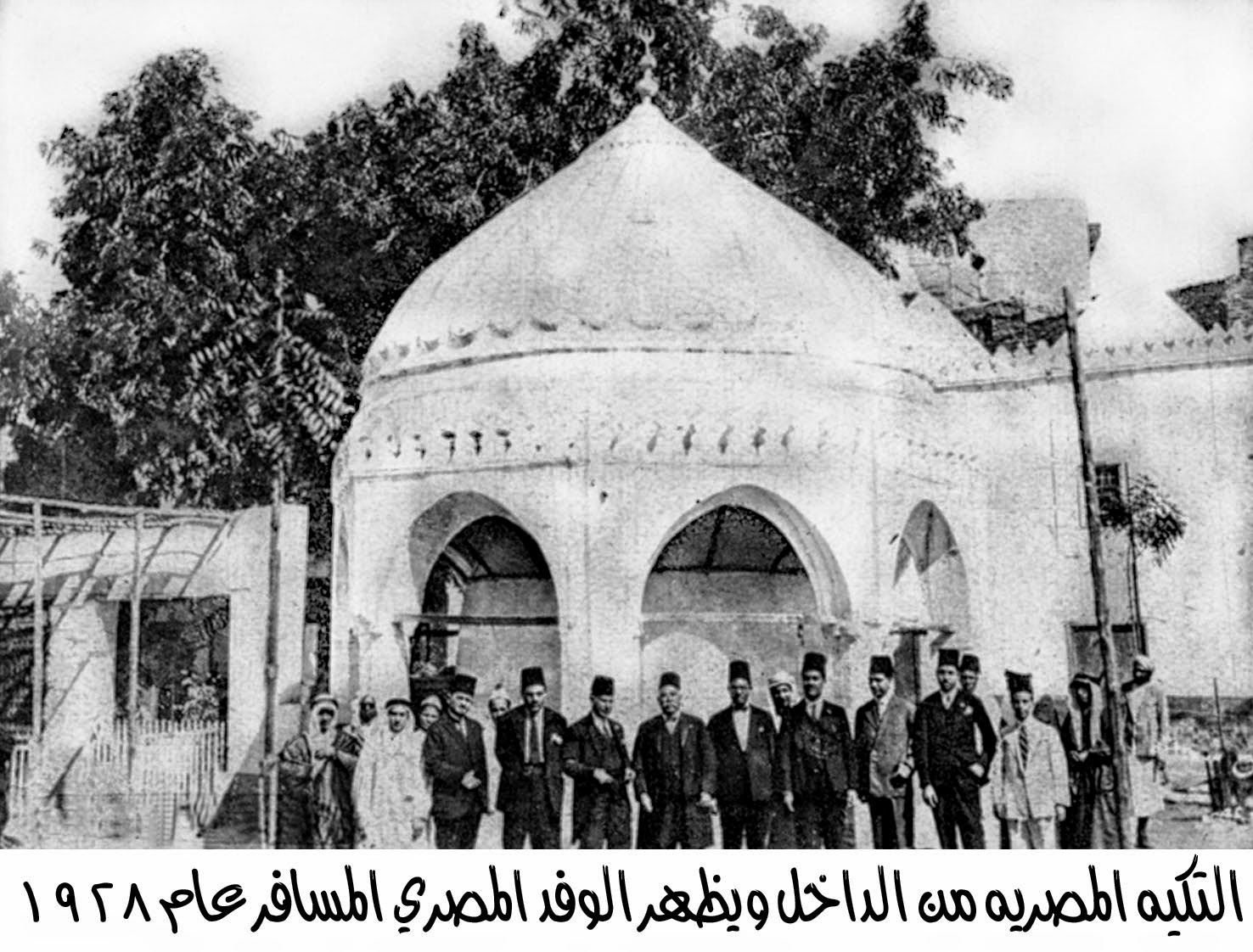
Egyptian Sufi lodge at Mekka, Saudi Arabia in 1928.

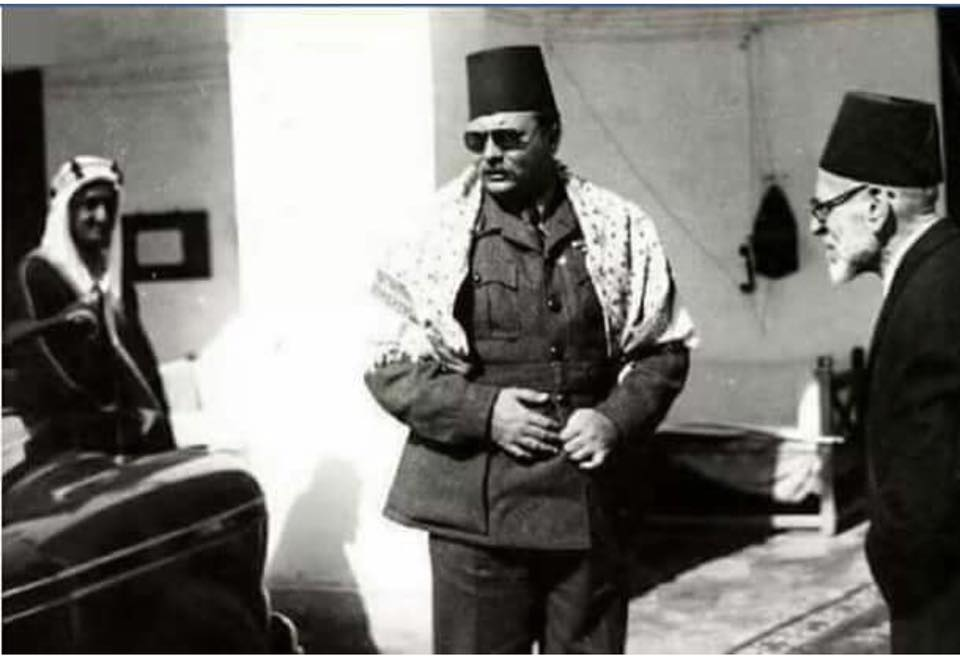
King Farouk and Prince Faisal at the Egyptian Sufi lodge at Medina, Saudi Arabia in 1945.

The patronage of Sufi lodges historically made an important political and cultural statement. The patronage of a Sufi building by a ruler showed their support for Sufi religious practices and the spreading of Islam. Funding a Sufi building was seen as an act of piety and a way in which the ruler could align themselves with public opinion.

Sufi lodges are often associated with tombs of Sufi saints or shaykhs. Typically, they feature a large hall where practitioners could pray and meditate. They also include lodgings for traveling Sufis and pilgrims.

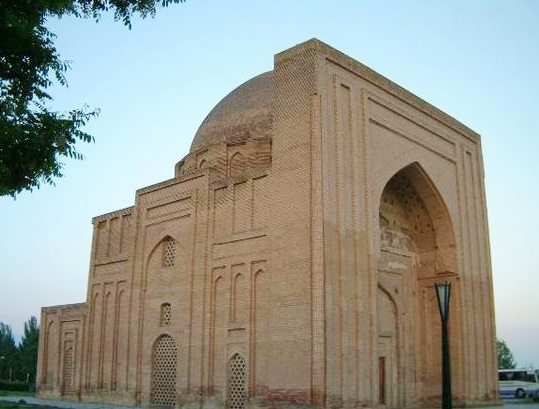
The Haruniyeh Tomb, named after Harun al-Rashid, in Tus, Iran. The present structure, a khānaqāh, was probably built in the 13th century. Al-Ghazali is buried here.

In addition to their religious spaces, Sufi lodges also had structures for public services. This included hospitals, kitchens, bathhouses, and schools. Everyone working to provide these services was paid through a waqf.

Sufi lodges have been very inclusive. Visitors from different cultures and religions could visit them and receive a blessing.

Traditionally, Sufi communal lives of asceticism were seen as pious because solitude and self-sufficiency were believed to lead to ego-centricity. Penitence and suffering were intended to bring Sufis closer to understanding divinity.

== History ==
=== Zangid Syria ===
Nur ad-Din Zangi was the first large patron of Sufi structures; he built and gifted khānaqāhs to Sufi groups in his dominion. In Damascus, khānaqāhs were located inside as well as outside of the city walls. Under the Zangids, khānaqāhs were very centrally located in Old Damascus, near the Umayyad Mosque. Khanaqahs were commonly placed near a madrasa dedicated to the same patron as the khānaqāh. The main purpose of the khānaqāh was for legal education. Most, including Nur ad-Din's khānaqāh, included hospices. However, there was a deep interconnection between education and religion in Sufi buildings, by the end of the Mamluk period the distinction between religious and educational buildings became blurred.

=== Ayyubid and Mamluk Egypt ===
Saladin founded the first khānaqāh in Cairo, Egypt in 1173. This officially marked the defeat of the Fatimids, who were largely Shi'ite, and the beginning of the Ayyubid period of Sunnism. In 1325, the Mamluk Sultan al-Nāṣir Muḥammad relocated the khānaqāh north of the city. Saladin changed the Sa'id al-Su'ada, a Fatimid palace, into a Sufi khānaqāh called al-Khānaqāh al-Ṣalāḥiyya (not to be confused with the Al-Khanqah al-Salahiyya Mosque in Jerusalem). This khānaqāh provided a place to stay for Sufis who were not from Cairo. It was provided by Saladin based on the exchange of Sufis supporting the Ayyubid dynasty and policies.

Saladin also created the role of the Chief Sufi, whose job was to operate activities from day to day and mentor the Sufis that lived in and visited the khānaqāh. There was a lot of competition for this role due to its great degree of influence. The Chief Sufi maintained a close relationship with the Ayyubid Sultan, obtained military power and influence, and had the ability to teach at the madrasas in the area. The Sultan gave a large degree of power to the Sufis in Cairo as part of an important trade off for political support which was incredibly important in solidifying the legitimacy of the Sultan's rule. Scholars in the Mamluk world often did not differentiate between khānaqāhs, ribāṭs, zāwiyas, and madrasas.

=== Maghreb ===
In the Maghreb, Sufi lodges have been mostly known as zāwiyas or ribāṭs.

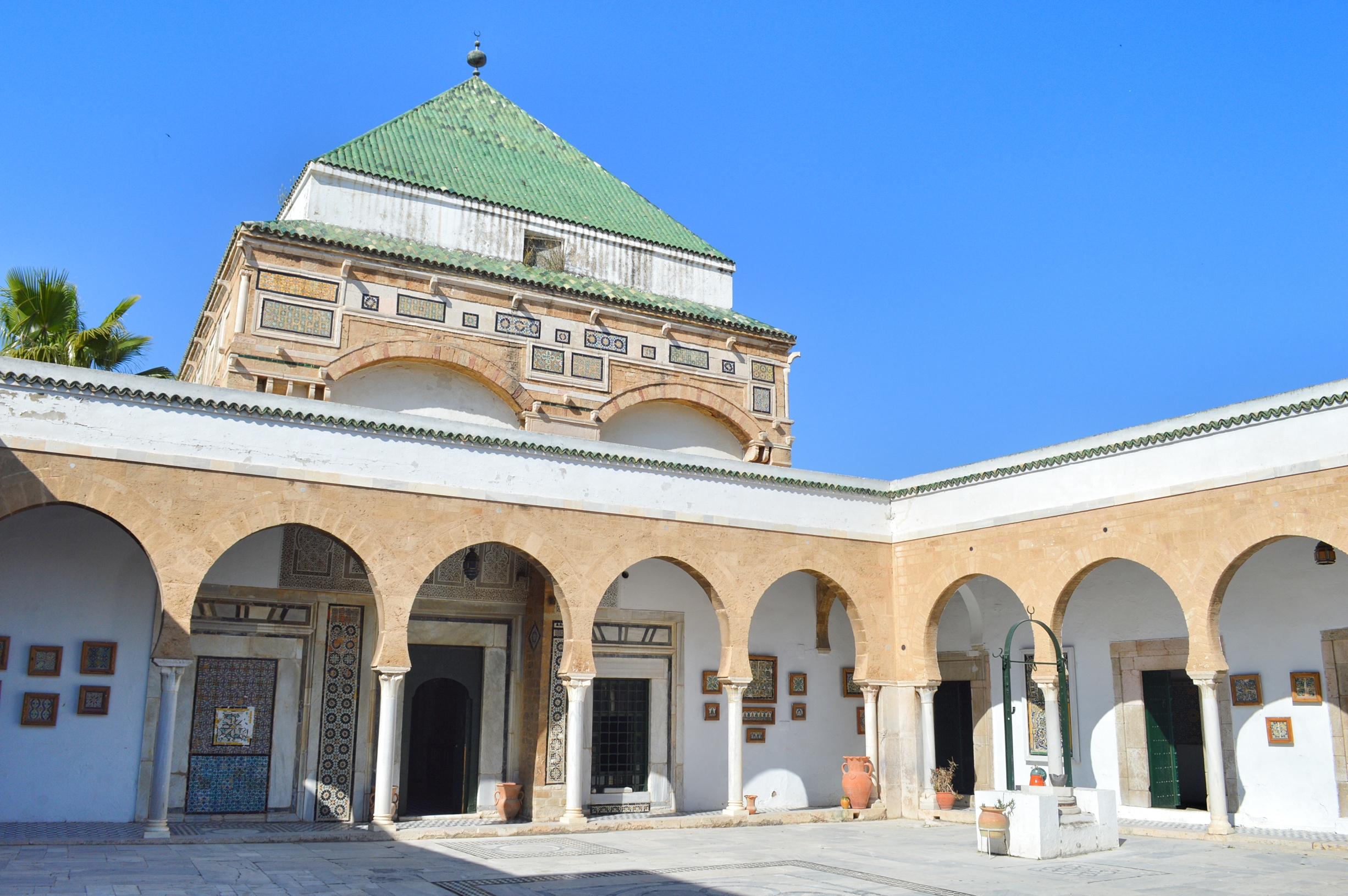
The Zawiya of Sidi Qasim al-Jalizi in Tunis

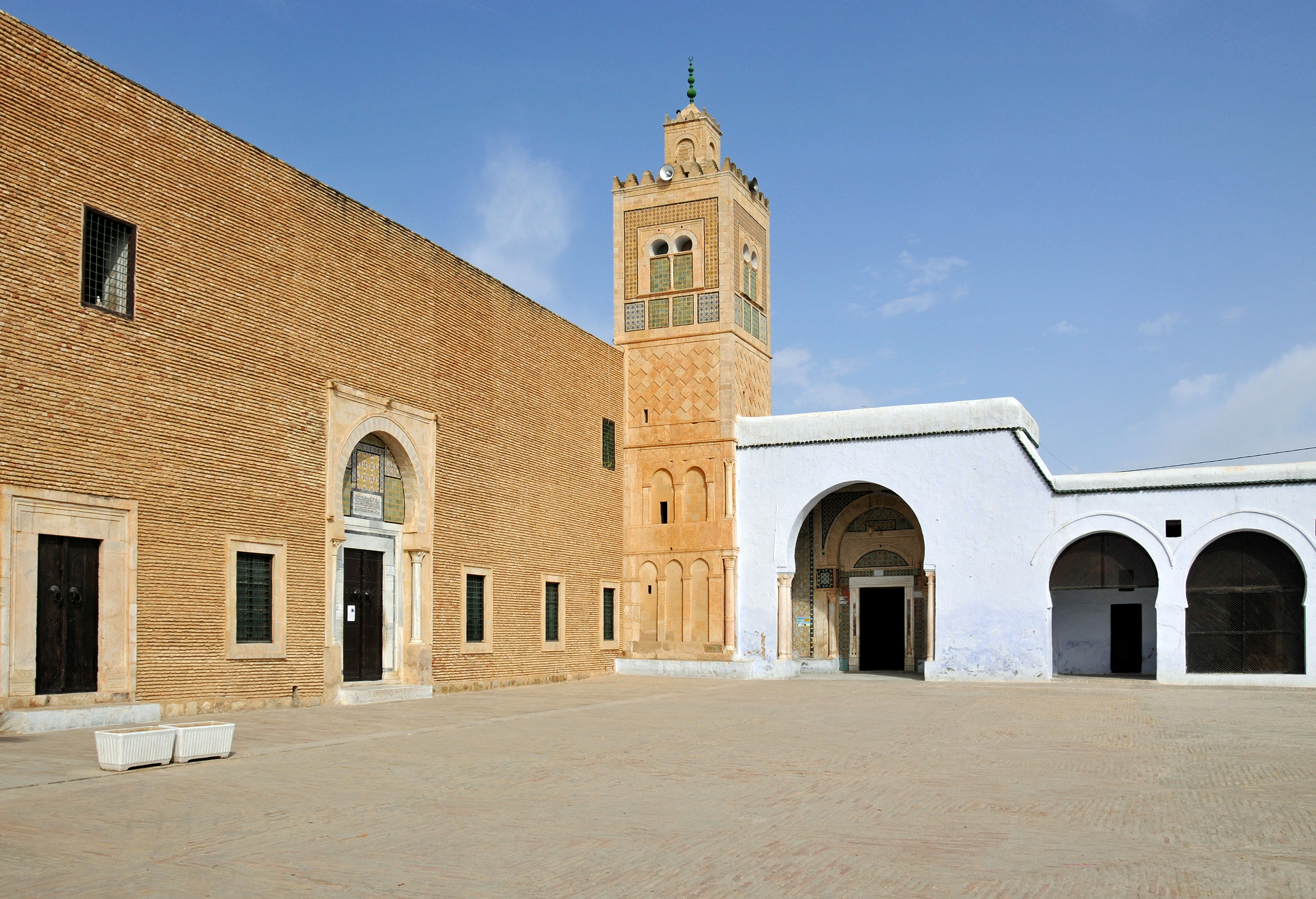
The Zawiya of Sidi Sahib in Kairouan (rebuilt in the 17th century)

=== Ottoman Empire ===
Many takyas (Ottoman Turkish: تَكْیه‌لر, romanized: tekyeler; modern Turkish: tekkeler) have been built in Turkey and in the countries which came under Ottoman rule. The Ottomans used the words takya (Ottoman Turkish: تَكْیه, romanized: tekye), dargāh (دَرگاه, dergâh) and zāwiya (زاویه, zâviye) instead of khānaqāh (خانَقاه, hanekâh). Among the Ottoman Sufi orders which had the most takyas were the Mevlevi Order or Mawlawiyya and the Bektashi Order. The takyas of the Mevlevi Order were called Mawlawī khānas (Ottoman Turkish: مولوی خانه‌لر, romanized: Mevlevî haneler, lit. 'Mawlawī houses').

By the 20th century, Istanbul itself counted many takyas. Some were dedicated to certain Muslim communities (for example, the Uzbeks' Takya (Note: Ottoman Turkish: اوزبكلر تكیه‌سی, romanized: Özbekler Tekyesi; Turkish: Özbekler Tekkesi.) or the Indians' Takya (Note: Ottoman Turkish: هندولر تکیه‌سی, romanized: Hindiler Tekyesi; Turkish: Hindiler Tekkesi.)) which symbolized a certain recognition of these communities by the Ottomans.

Ottoman takyas can be found in Albania, Bosnia and Herzegovina, Cyprus, Egypt, Greece, North Macedonia, and Syria.

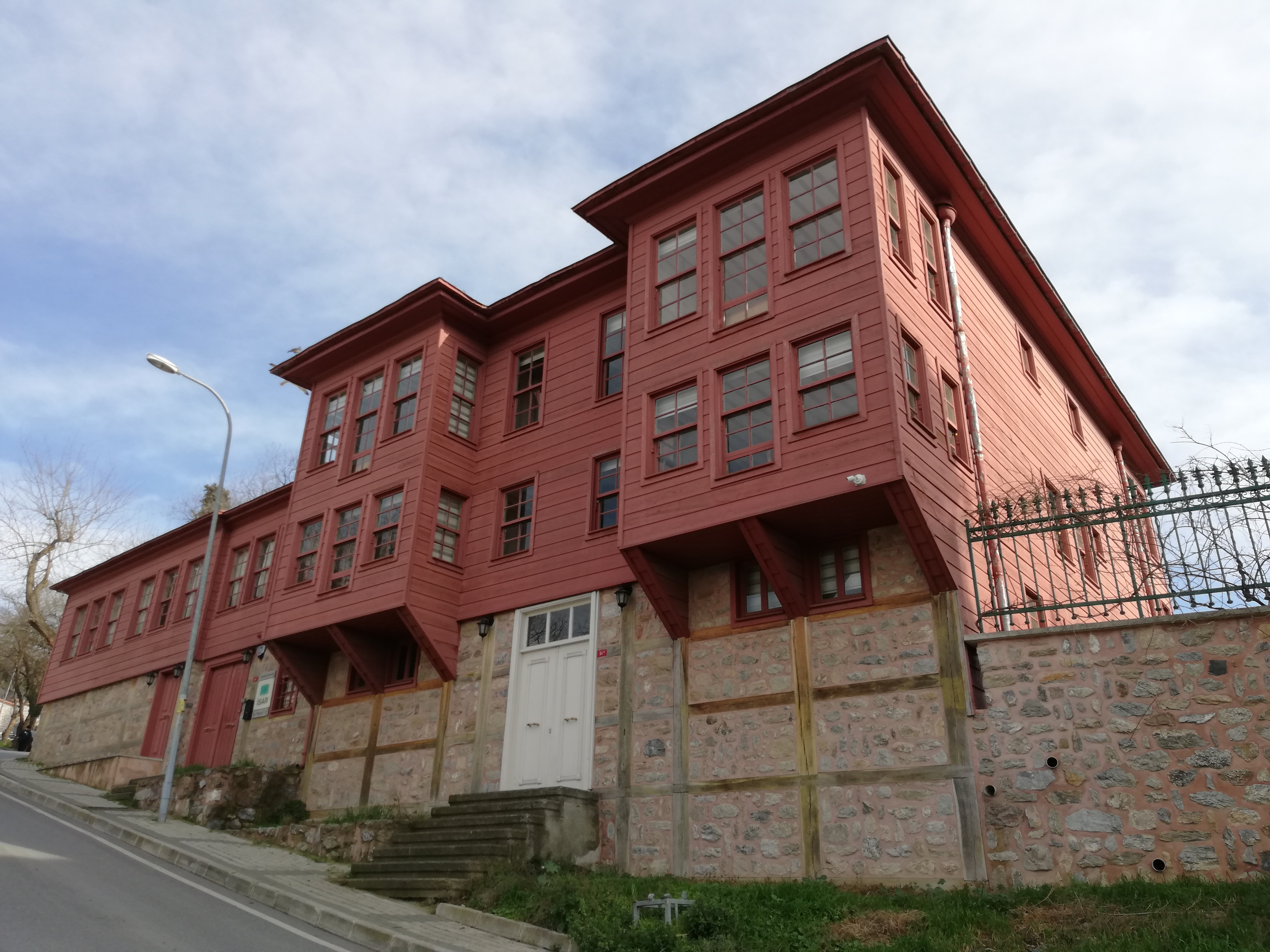
The Uzbeks' Takya in Istanbul

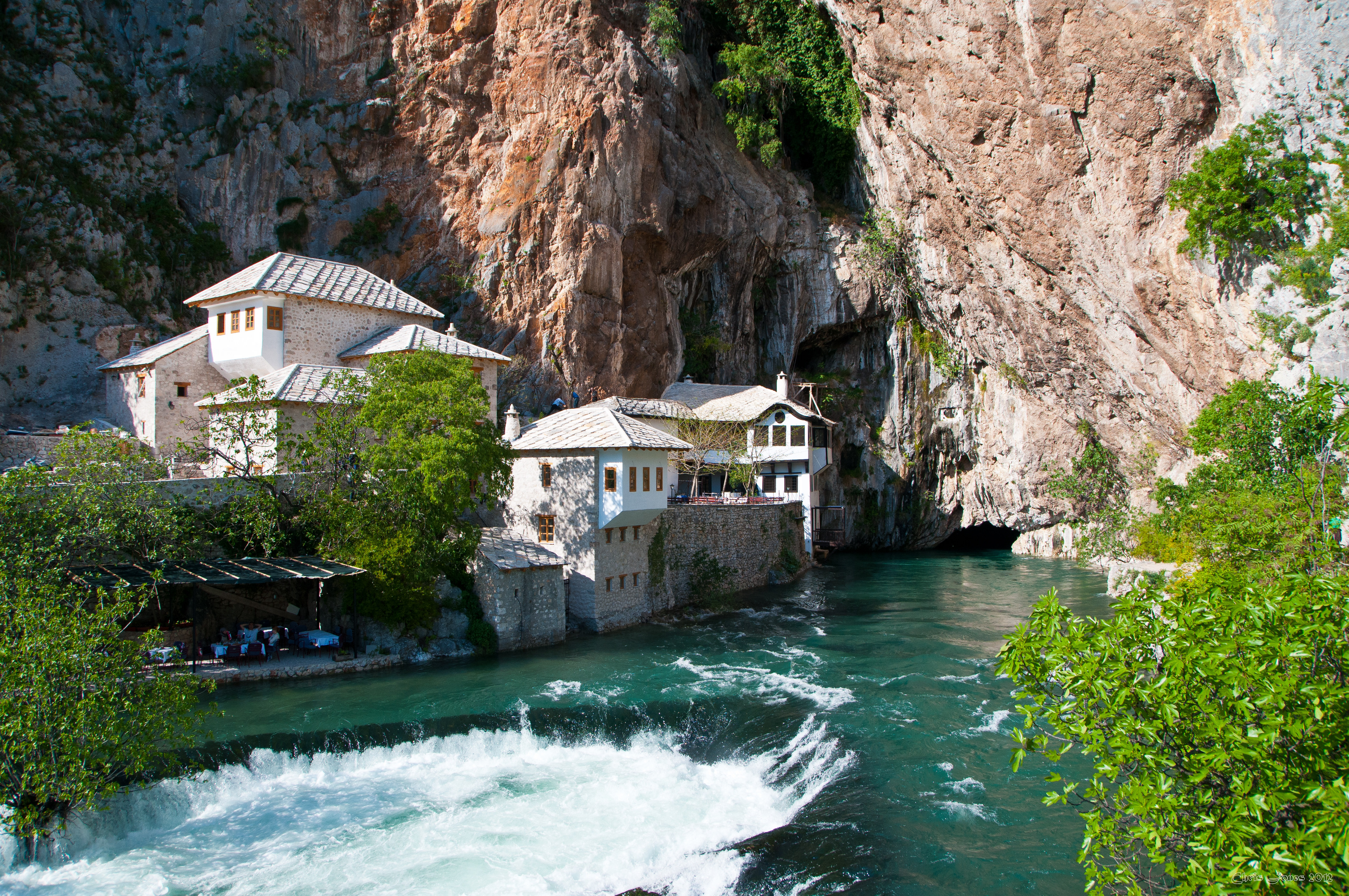
The Takya of Blagaj, Bosnia and Herzegovina

=== Iran ===
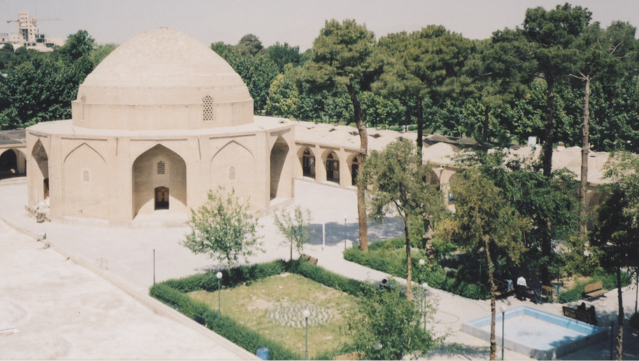
The Tohidkhaneh, a medieval khānaqāh in Isfahan, Iran

Many Sufi lodges existed in Iran during the Middle Ages. Examples include the Tohidkhaneh in Isfahan. After the Safavid conversion of Iran to Shia Islam, many Sufi lodges became used as ḥusayniyyas (buildings where Shia Muslims gather to mourn the death of Husayn ibn Ali in the month of Muharram).

=== South Asia ===
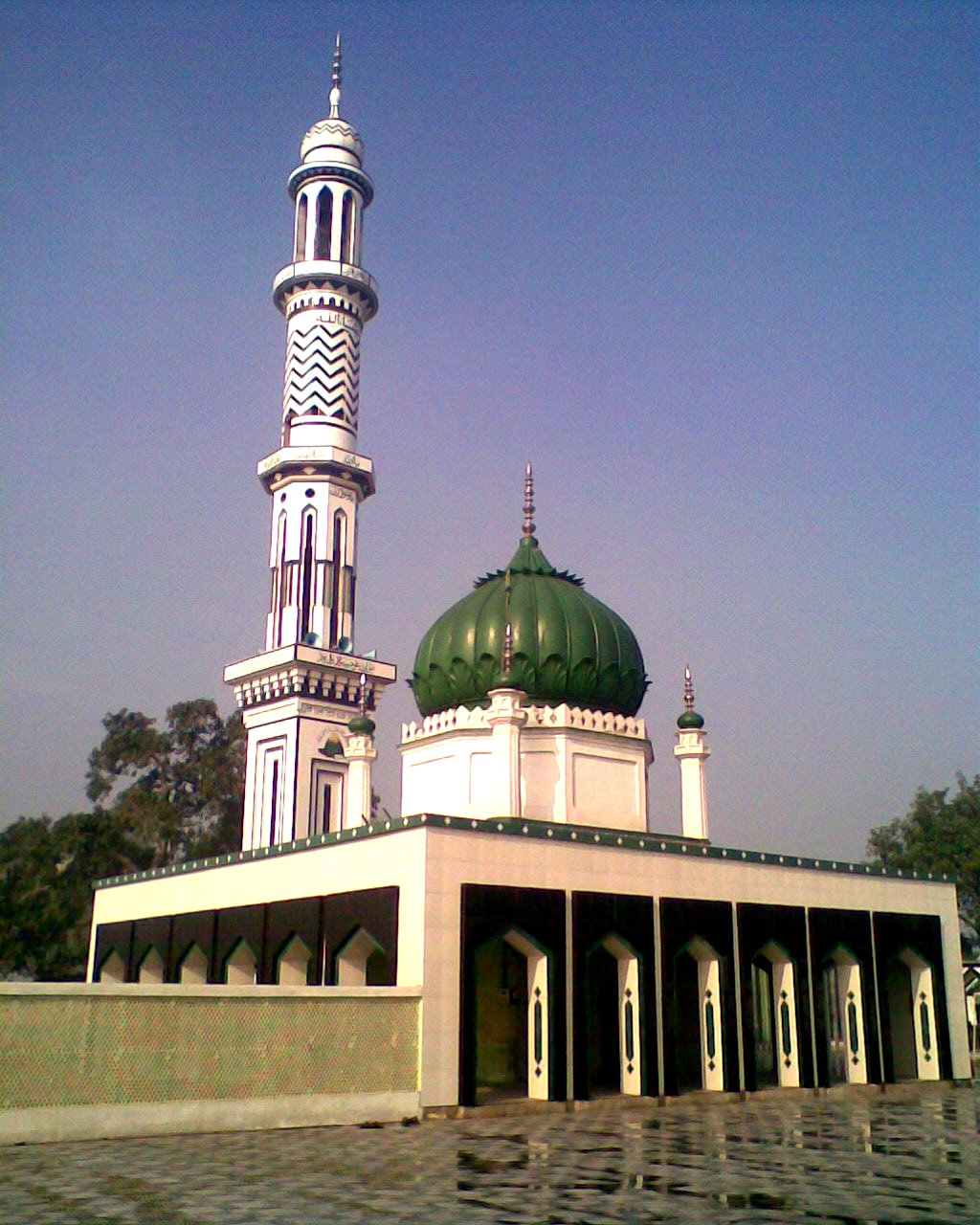
The Tomb of Naqshbandi Saints Faiz-ul Hassan Shah and Muhammad Amin Shah Sani in Allo Mahar, Sialkot

In South Asia, the words khānaqāh, jamāʿat-khāna (Urdu: جماعت خانہ), takya (Urdu: تَکْیہ, lit. 'pillow, bolster'), dargāh (Urdu: درگاہ, lit. 'royal court'), langar (Urdu: لنگر, lit. 'refectory' (Note: From Sanskrit.)), and sometimes ʿimārat (Urdu: عمارت, lit. 'building'). are used interchangeably for Sufi lodges.

The Madrasa-i-Firozshahi was built by Sultan Firoz Shah Tughlaq near Hauz-i-Alai. Its architecture was said to be so appealing to locals that they relocated to be closer to the complex. The khānaqāh-madrasa structure had educational opportunities for the pious, and teachers were paid with stipends. Its main purpose was to offer lodging for travelers.

The Khanaqah of Sayed Ghulam Ali Shah Mashadi in India was visited by and open to pilgrims from many different cultures around the world. Khānaqāhs had langar-khānas, which served as free public kitchens for the poor sponsored by endowments from lakhiraj lands. Islamic values of equality and fraternity brought khānaqāhs to provide services for members of the lowest castes. The popularity of khānaqāhs declined in the early 14th century in India.

== Architecture ==
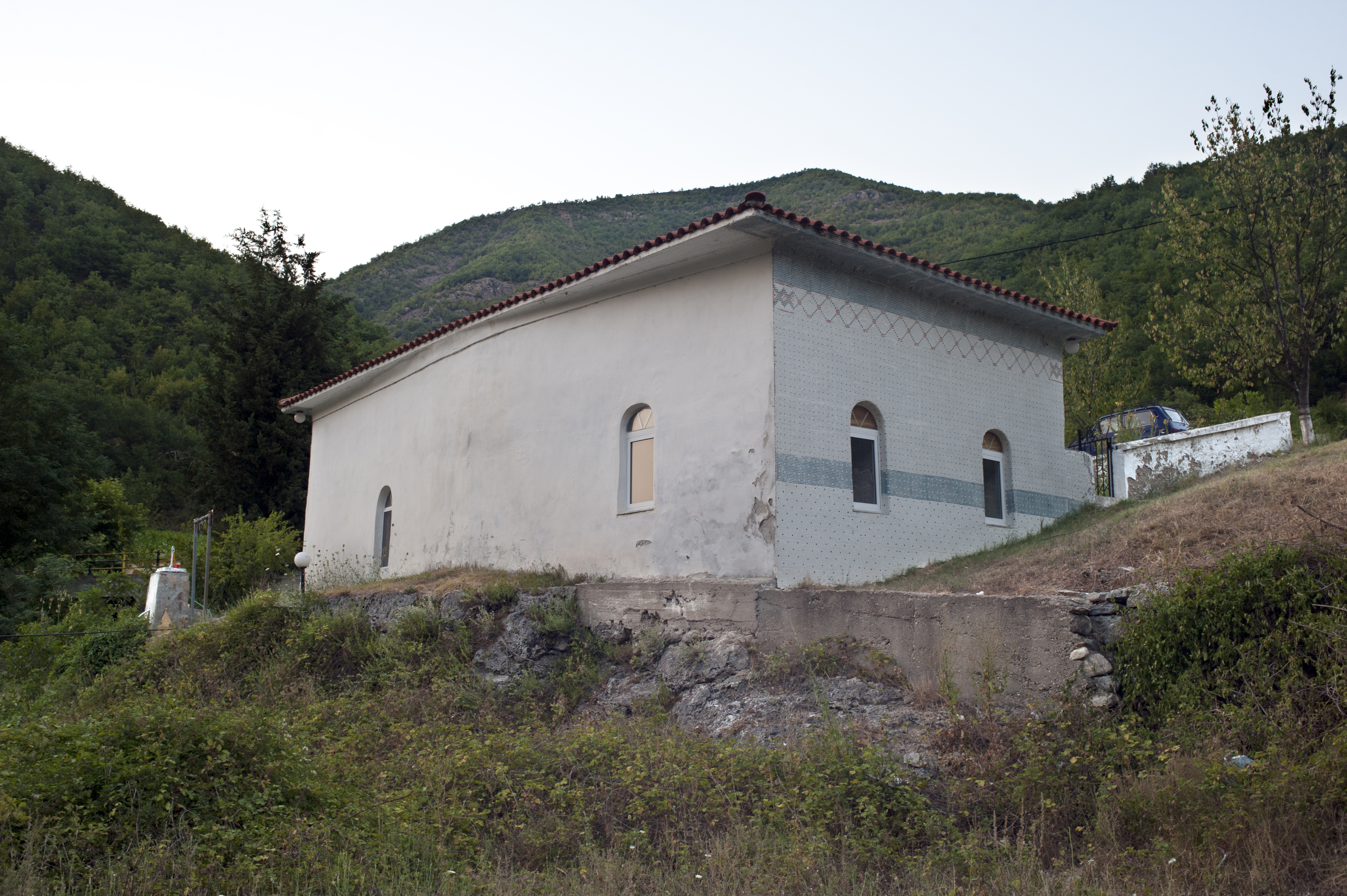
The Budala Hodja Tekke in Thermes, Greece

Prior to the Timurid period, Sufi lodges were typically designed as large complexes with several structures. After the fourteenth century, they were more commonly designed as one large structure. This design is typically characterized by one large hall with cells or galleries on either side, allowing more interaction for those working in the lodge. They commonly have domes, mosaics, arches, columns, courtyards, portals, and minarets. The design and incorporation of these aspects varies by region and era.

== See also ==
- Islamic architecture
- Ottoman architecture
- Architecture of Iran
- List of historical tekkes, zaviyes, and dergahs in Istanbul
