= Rana Abdul Sattar =

Pakistani politician (born 1982)

Member of the Provincial Assembly of the Punjab
- In office 15 August 2018 – 14 January 2023
- Constituency: PP-45 Sialkot-XI
- In office 1 June 2013 – 31 May 2018
- Constituency: PP-124 (Sialkot-IV)

Member of the National Assembly of Pakistan
- In office 2008–2013
- Constituency: NA-112 (Sialkot-III)
- Incumbent
- Assumed office 24 February 2024

Personal details
- Born: 2 March 1982 (age 44)
- Party: PMLN (2008-present)
- Parent: Rana Shamim Ahmed Khan (father)

Rana Abdul Sattar Khan is a Pakistani politician who had been a Member of the Provincial Assembly of the Punjab from August 2018 till January 2023. Previously he was a member of the Punjab Assembly from June 2013 to May 2018 and was a member of the National Assembly of Pakistan from 2008 to 2013.

== Early life ==
Abdul Sattar was born on 2 March 1982. His father, Rana Shamim Ahmed Khan, has also served as a member of the Punjab provincial assembly and the National Assembly of Pakistan.

== Political career ==
He was elected to the National Assembly of Pakistan from Constituency NA-112 (Sialkot-III) as a candidate of Pakistan Muslim League-N (PML-N) in the 2008 Pakistani general election. He received 92,182 votes and defeated Shujaat Hussain. In the same election, he was elected to the Provincial Assembly of the Punjab as a candidate of PML-N from Constituency PP-124 (Sialkot-V). He received 36,078 and defeated Malik Tahir Akhtar, a candidate of Pakistan Peoples Party (PPP). He vacated the Punjab Assembly seat.

He was re-elected to the Provincial Assembly of the Punjab as a candidate of PML-N from Constituency PP-124 (Sialkot-V) in the 2013 Pakistani general election. He received 55,565 votes and defeated Malik Jamshed Ghias, a candidate of Pakistan Tehreek-e-Insaf (PTI).

He was re-elected to Provincial Assembly of the Punjab as a candidate of PML-N from Constituency PP-45 (Sialkot-XI) in the 2018 Pakistani general election.
