= Rana Shamim Ahmed Khan =

Pakistani politician (born 1942)

Shamim Ahmed
- شمیم احمد

Member of the National Assembly of Pakistan
- In office 13 August 2018 – 10 August 2023
- Constituency: NA-76 (Sialkot-V)
- In office 1 June 2013 – 31 May 2018
- Constituency: NA-112 (Sialkot-III)

Personal details
- Born: 6 July 1942 (age 84) Hoshiarpur, British India
- Other political affiliations: Pakistan Muslim League (N) (2018-2024)
- Children: Rana Abdul Sattar Rana Abdullah Rana Abdul Rahman Rana Abdul Aziz Rana Abdul Rahheem

Rana Shamim Ahmed Khan (Urdu: رانا شمیم احمد خان; born 6 July 1942) is a Pakistani politician who had been a member of the National Assembly of Pakistan from August 2018 till August 2023. Previously he was member of the National Assembly from June 2013 to May 2018 and a member of the Provincial Assembly of the Punjab from 1985 to 1996. He is current chairman of Standing Committee for Kashmir affairs and Gilgit Baltistan.

== Early life ==
Shamim was born on 6 July 1942 to father Rana Muhammad Chiragh, and hails from Sialkot.

== Political career ==
He was elected to the Provincial Assembly of the Punjab from Constituency PP-145 (Sialkot) in the 1985 Pakistani general election.

He was re-elected to the Provincial Assembly of the Punjab as a candidate for Islami Jamhoori Ittehad (IJI) for Constituency PP-105 (Sialkot) in the 1988 Pakistani general election. He received 31,001 votes and defeated Khalid Muhammad Khaliq, a candidate of PPP.

He was re-elected to the Provincial Assembly of the Punjab as a candidate for IJI for Constituency PP-105 (Sialkot) in the 1990 Pakistani general election. He received 39,786 votes and defeated Ijaz Hussain, a candidate of Pakistan Democratic Alliance (PDA).

He was re-elected to the Provincial Assembly of the Punjab as a candidate for Pakistan Peoples Party (PPP) for Constituency PP-105 (Sialkot) in the 1993 Pakistani general election. He received 33,829 votes and defeated Malik Awais Ahmad Bhatti, a candidate of Pakistan Muslim League (N) (PML-N).

Shamim was re-elected to the Provincial Assembly of the Punjab as a candidate for PML-N for Constituency PP-124 (Sialkot-IV) in the 2008 Pakistani general election. He received 24,994 votes and defeated Zulfiqar Ali Ghuman, a candidate of Pakistan Muslim League (Q) (PML-Q).

He was re-elected to the Provincial Assembly of the Punjab as a candidate for PML-N for PP-124 (Sialkot-IV) in by-polls held in June 2008. He received 24,994 votes.

He was elected to the National Assembly of Pakistan as a candidate for PML-N for Constituency NA-112 (Sialkot-III) in the 2013 Pakistani general election. He received 129,571 votes and defeated Salman Saif Cheema, a candidate of Pakistan Tehreek-e-Insaf (PTI).

He was re-elected to the National Assembly as a candidate of PML-N from Constituency NA-76 (Sialkot-V) in the 2018 Pakistani general election. He received 133,664 votes and defeated Muhammad Aslam Ghumman, a candidate of PTI.

== Personal life ==
Shamim's son Rana Abdul Sattar has also served as a member of the Punjab provincial assembly.Other Son Rana Abdul Aziz is in Police service of pakistan. Aziz was also a topper in Central Superior Services Exam in 2010,In 2024 promoted in BPS-19.
