= Allo Mahar =

Coordinates: 32°24′0″N 74°25′0″E

Allo Mahar آلو مہار شریف
- Village and union council
- Interactive map of Allo Mahar
- Country: Pakistan
- Province: Punjab
- District: Sialkot
- Tehsil: Daska
- Time zone: UTC+5 (PST)

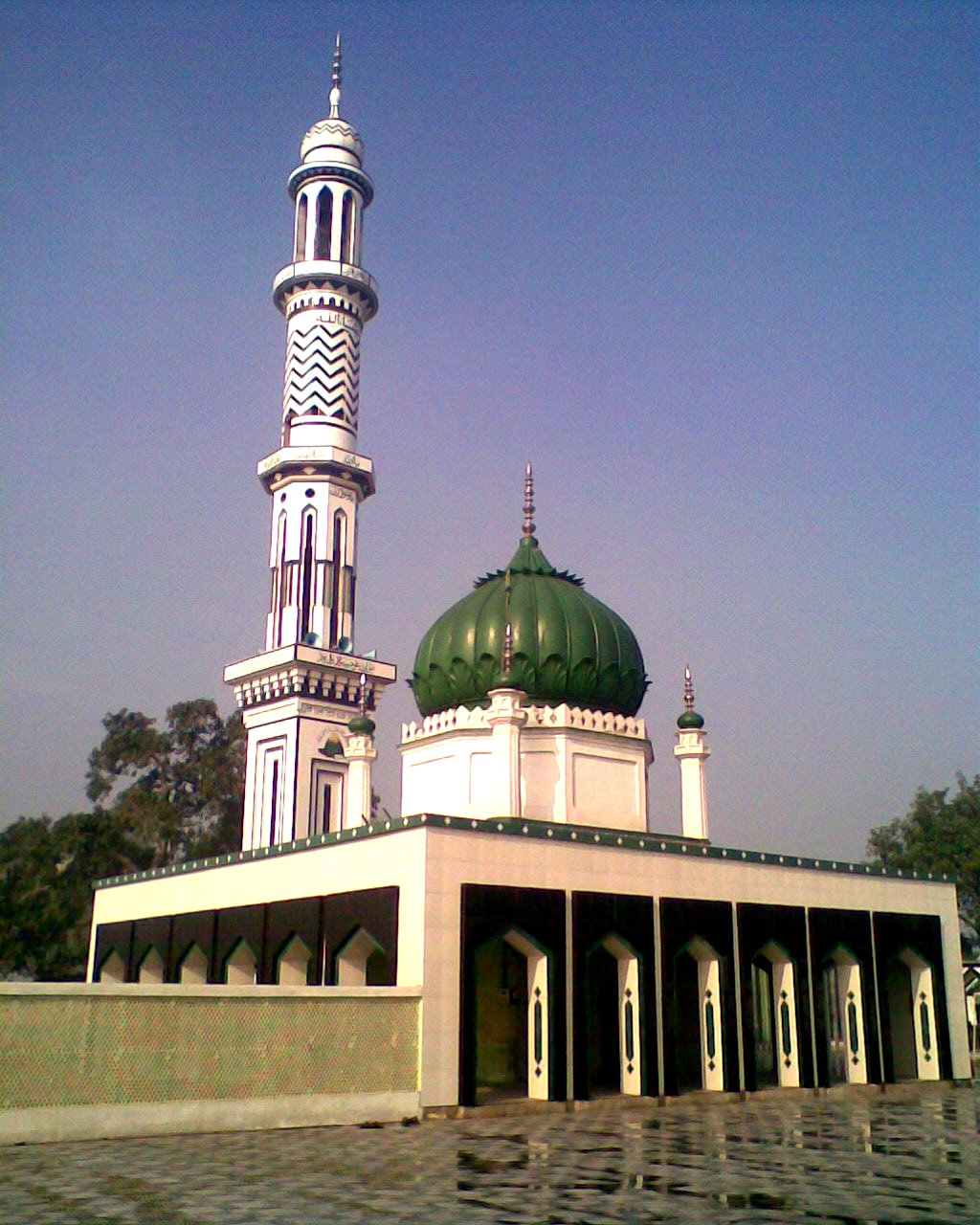
Shrine of Islamic Naqshbandi saints of Allo Mahar Sharif

Allo Mahar is a village and union council of Daska Tehsil, Sialkot District in Punjab, Pakistan. The village is located at 32°23'60N 74°25'0E and lies 8 km to the west of Daska and 15 km southwest of the district capital – Sialkot. It holds the title of a modern village of tehsil Daska. It contains the shrines of many Nakshbandi saints and preachers. It is the birthplace of Naqshbandi saint Muhammad Channan Shah Nuri who started the religious lineage (silsila) known as Naqshbandia Mujadadia Aminia.

== Political and religious influence ==
Indeed, Allo Mahar is mostly known by spiritual personalities and the services towards religion but since last Forty to Fifty years it is also well known by the political activities & personality Syed Iftikhar Ul Hassan(Zahray Shah).He was thrice elected MPA & the equal number of time elected Member National Assembly. He was never defeated for the rest of his life till his demise in August 2020. He was a famous personality of District, Sialkot & same in the party PML(N)His legacy is carried on by his daughter Syeda Nosheen Iftikhar MNA and Syed Ata Ul Hassan. Some other political faces Alo Mahar kept with same family members like Syed Hasnat Ul Hassan Ex Chairman District, Council Sialkot. As far as spiritual matters is concerned the legacy led by Sahabzada Syed Murtaza Amin who is current Sajjada Nasheen of Darbar Aliya Allo Mahar Sharif. Urs Mubarik is held on 23 March every year at the same place.

== See also ==
- Muhammad Jewan Shah Naqvi
- Muhammad Channan Shah Nuri
- Muhammad Amin Shah Sani
- Syed Faiz-ul Hassan Shah
- Khalid Hasan Shah
- Sahabzada Syed Murtaza Amin
