= Ali Asjad Malhi =

Pakistani Politician

Choudhary Ali Asjad Malhi

President of PTI Sialkot
- Incumbent
- Assumed office 13 April 2022
- Leader: Imran Khan; Gohar Ali Khan

Member of National Assembly of Pakistan
- In office 16 November 2002 – 15 November 2008
- President: Pervez Musharraf
- Prime Minister: Shujaat Hussain

Federal Minister for Information Technology and Telecommunication
- In office 4 September 2004 – 15 November 2007
- President: Pervez Musharraf
- Prime Minister: Shaukat Aziz

Personal details
- Born: Sialkot, Punjab, Pakistan
- Party: PTI (2014-present)
- Other political affiliations: PML(Q) (2002-2014)

Ali Asjad Malhi is a former Pakistani Minister and member of the National Assembly of Pakistan from Sialkot District. He served in the National Assembly of Pakistan from 2002 to 2008.

== Personal life ==
Malhi belongs to a family of Bureaucrats and is a businessman by profession. He is the nephew of Sikandar Hayat Malhi who was also a member of the National Assembly as well as the Punjab Provincial Assembly.

== Political career ==
Malhi started his political career serving as District Naib Nazim

He was later elected to the National Assembly of Pakistan in 2002. He defeated the Independent candidate Armaghan Subhani.

He served as Federal Minister of Information Technology and Telecommunications Division as well as minister of State for Defense.

Malhi was a former member of Pakistan Muslim League (Q) and joined Pakistan Tehreek-e-Insaf in 2014.

Malhi contested to become a member of the National Assembly from NA-75 Sialkot-IV but lost to PML-N Candidate Syed Iftikhar Ul Hassan in the 2018 general election.

In a 2021 by-election in NA-75 Sialkot-IV, Malhi lost to PML-N candidate Syeda Nosheen Iftikhar.

Malhi among the key PTI leaders who were arrested and his house which was a rendezvous point was raided.
