= Aslam Ghumman =

Pakistani politician

Member of the National Assembly of Pakistan
- Incumbent
- Assumed office 29 February 2024
- Constituency: NA-74 Sialkot-V

Personal details
- Party: PTI (2018–present)

Aslam Ghumman is a Pakistani politician who has been serving as a member of the National Assembly of Pakistan since 29 February 2024. He was born on 1st of July, 1948 in the small town of Sambrial, which is now a tehsil of District Sialkot. He served in Pakistan Army and retired as a brigadier. He was appointed as the Sector Commander ISI Punjab in 2001-3, and after DG National Accountability Bureau Peshawar by Pervez Musharraf. After retirement from Pakistan Army, He became the Director General of Anti-Corruption Punjab

== Early life ==
Born in Sialkot into a humble farming family, he pursued his higher education at the University of Agriculture, Faisalabad, where he earned his degree between 1967 and 1973.

== Political career ==
His younger Brother Azeem Noori Won the MPA seat, when he was in Service

Aslam's Political career started in 2013 General Elections. He contested the 2013 elections from NA-74 but he couldn't make it to the National Assembly. In 2013 and 2018, He lose the Election of MNA.

He then won the 2024 Pakistani general election from NA-74 Sialkot-V as an Independent candidate, receiving 130,504 votes. The runner-up, Rana Shamim Ahmed Khan of the Pakistan Muslim League (N), secured 95,988 votes.

On 16 February 2024, he was kidnapped by unknown persons. But very soon Recovered and he Took oath as MNA.
