= Syeda Nosheen Iftikhar =

Pakistani politician

Member of the National Assembly of Pakistan
- Incumbent
- Assumed office 29 February 2024
- Constituency: NA-73 Sialkot-IV
- In office 19 April 2021 – 10 August 2023
- Constituency: NA-75 (Sialkot-IV)

Personal details
- Party: PMLN (2021-present)
- Spouse: Sahabzada Syed Murtaza Amin
- Parent: Syed Iftikhar Ul Hassan (father)

Syeda Nosheen Iftikhar (Urdu: سیدہ نوشین افتخار) is a Pakistani politician who has been a member of the National Assembly of Pakistan since February 2024 and previously served in this position from April 2021 till August 2023. She had won the by-elections from constituency NA-75 (Sialkot-IV).

== Personal life ==
Syeda Nosheen Iftikhar is a daughter of Member of National Assembly of Pakistan Syed Iftikhar Ul Hassan. For 5 times, her husband Sahabzada Syed Murtaza Amin was a member of National Assembly of Pakistan, a religious leader of Allo Mahar and the current president of Spiritual Naqshbandi chain of Islam with millions of followers not only in Pakistan but also in other countries. Her son Syed Imam Murtaza is next in row to preside Naqshbandi chain of saints of Allo Mahar and to carry on political legacy of this religious and political family of Allo Mahar.

== Political career ==
She contested by-elections held on 10 April 2021 from constituency NA-75 (Sialkot-IV). She defeated PTI candidate Ali Asjad Malhi. She secured 110,075 votes, whereas Ali Asjad Malhi obtained 93,433 votes.
