= Tohidkhaneh =

Iranian national heritage site

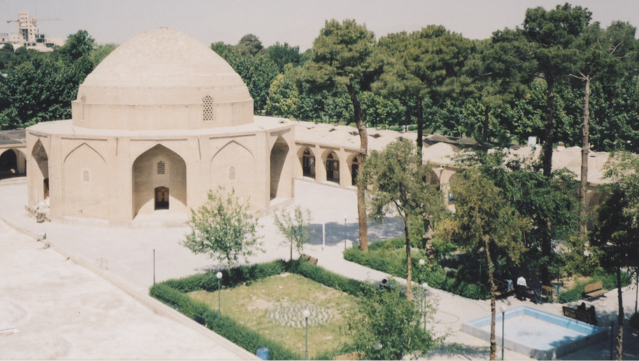

- Location within Iran

Religion
- Affiliation: Shia Islam
- Province: Isfahan

Location
- Location: Isfahan, Iran
- Municipality: Isfahan
- Coordinates: 32.657342°N 51.675783°E

Architecture
- Type: Khaneghah
- Style: Isfahani

Specifications
- Dome: 1
- Minaret: 0

The Tohidkhaneh (Persian: توحیدخانه) is a historical building in Isfahan, Iran. The building is located behind the Ālī Qāpū palace. It was used as the kitchen and the prison of the palace for some time. It is said that Sufis met there on Friday evenings in the era of Abbas I, during which they prayed for the Shah. It is also said that the Shah himself attended these meetings. It is now used as a part of the Faculty of Architecture and Urban Design.
