= NA-73 Sialkot-IV =

Constituency in the National Assembly of Pakistan

- Constituency for the National Assembly of Pakistan
- Region: Daska Tehsil (partly) including Daska city of Sialkot District
- Electorate: 453,104

Current constituency
- Party: Pakistan Muslim League (N)
- Member: Syeda Nosheen Iftikhar
- Created from: NA-113 Sialkot-IV

NA-73 Sialkot-IV (این اے-73، سيالکوٹ-4) is a constituency for the National Assembly of Pakistan. It consists of Daska Tehsil.

== Election 2002 ==
General elections were held on 10 October 2002. Ali Asjad Malhi of PML-Q won by 50,592 votes.

General election 2002: NA-113 Sialkot-IV
| Party | Candidate | Votes | % | ±% |
|---|---|---|---|---|
| PML(Q) | Ali Asjad Malhi | 50,592 | 35.77 | |
| PPP | Sultan Sikandar Ghumman | 45,706 | 32.32 | |
| PML(N) | Zafar Hussain Gil | 44,215 | 31.26 | |
| Others | Others (two candidates) | 926 | 0.65 | |
| Turnout | | 146,762 | 42.65 | |
| Total valid votes | | 141,439 | 96.37 | |
| Rejected ballots | | 5,323 | 3.63 | |
| Majority | | 4,886 | 3.45 | |
| Registered electors | | 344,117 | | |

== Election 2008 ==
General elections were held on 18 February 2008. Sahibzada Syed Murtaza Amin of PML-N won by 77,819 votes.

General election 2008: NA-113 Sialkot-IV
| Party | Candidate | Votes | % | ±% |
|---|---|---|---|---|
| PML(N) | Sahabzada Syed Murtaza Amin | 77,819 | 50.07 | |
| PML(Q) | Ali Asjad Malhi | 39,186 | 25.21 | |
| PPP | Dr. Zaheer-UI-Hassan Rizvi | 31,996 | 20.59 | |
| Others | Others (six candidates) | 6,413 | 4.13 | |
| Turnout | | 161,410 | 55.23 | |
| Total valid votes | | 155,414 | 96.29 | |
| Rejected ballots | | 5,996 | 3.71 | |
| Majority | | 38,633 | 24.86 | |
| Registered electors | | 292,273 | | |
| PML(N) gain from PML(Q) | | | | |

== Election 2013 ==
General elections were held on 11 May 2013. Syed Iftkhar Ul Hassan of PML-N won by 118,192 votes and became the member of National Assembly.

General election 2013: NA-113 Sialkot-IV
| Party | Candidate | Votes | % | ±% |
|---|---|---|---|---|
| PML(N) | Syed Iftikhar UI Hassan | 118,192 | 60.12 | |
| PTI | Mirza Abdul Qayyum | 52,694 | 26.80 | |
| PML(Q) | Ali Asjad Malhi | 20,250 | 10.30 | |
| Others | Others (seven candidates) | 5,466 | 2.78 | |
| Turnout | | 201,807 | 57.05 | |
| Total valid votes | | 196,602 | 97.42 | |
| Rejected ballots | | 5,205 | 2.58 | |
| Majority | | 65,498 | 33.32 | |
| Registered electors | | 353,741 | | |
| PML(N) hold | | | | |

== Election 2018 ==
General elections were held on 25 July 2018.

General election 2018: NA-75 Sialkot-IV
| Party | Candidate | Votes | % | ±% |
|---|---|---|---|---|
| PML(N) | Syed Iftikhar Ul Hassan | 101,617 | 40.16 | |
| PTI | Ali Asjad Malhi | 61,432 | 24.28 | |
| Independent | Usman Abid | 57,571 | 22.75 | |
| Others | Others (eight candidates) | 25,134 | 9.93 | |
| Turnout | | 253,023 | 55.84 | |
| Rejected ballots | | 7,269 | 2.88 | |
| Majority | | 40,185 | 15.88 | |
| Registered electors | | 453,104 | | |
| PML(N) hold | | | | |

== By-election 2021 ==
The seat fell vacant due to the demise of PML-N MNA Syed Iftikharul Hassan Shah. The results of the by-elections were suspended due to suspicion of rigging. On 25 February, the Election Commission of Pakistan ruled that a re-poll would be held on 18 March 2021 in the whole constituency. On 10 April 2021, the re-poll was held in the whole constituency. As a result of the by-election, the PML-N's candidate Nausheen Iftikhar won the election by bagging 110,075 votes against PTI's Ali Asjad Malhi, who took 93,433 votes.

By-election 2021: NA-75 Sialkot-IV
| Party | Candidate | Votes | % | ±% |
|---|---|---|---|---|
| PML(N) | Syeda Nosheen Iftikhar | 110,075 | 51.42 | ▲11.26 |
| PTI | Ali Asjad Malhi | 93,433 | 43.65 | ▲19.37 |
| TLP | Muhammad Khalil Sandhu | 8,268 | 3.86 | ▼2.17 |
| Others | Others (six candidates) | 585 | 0.28 | |
| Turnout | | 214,063 | 43.33 | |
| Rejected ballots | | 1,702 | 0.79 | |
| Majority | | 16,642 | 7.77 | |
| Registered electors | | 494,003 | | |
| PML(N) hold | | | | |

== Election 2024 ==
General elections were held on 8 February 2024. Syeda Nosheen Iftikhar won the election with 112,178 votes.

2024 Pakistani general election: NA-74 Sialkot-IV
| Party | Candidate | Votes | % | ±% |
|---|---|---|---|---|
| PML(N) | Syeda Nosheen Iftikhar | 112,178 | 44.18 | ▼7.24 |
| PTI | Ali Asjad Malhi (Note: Filed nomination papers as PTI candidate but ECP allowed him to run as an Independent) | 104,190 | 41.94 | ▼2.61 |
| TLP | Tariq Maqsood | 20,229 | 7.97 | ▲4.11 |
| Others | Others (twenty-three candidates) | 17,307 | 6.82 | |
| Turnout | | 259,114 | 48.45 | ▲5.12 |
| Total valid votes | | 253,904 | 97.99 | |
| Rejected ballots | | 5,210 | 2.01 | |
| Majority | | 7,988 | 3.15 | ▼4.62 |
| Registered electors | | 534,798 | | |
| PML(N) hold | | | | |

== See also ==
- NA-72 Sialkot-III
- NA-74 Sialkot-V
