= Syed Iftikhar Ul Hassan =

Pakistani politician (1942–2020)

- سید افتخار الحسن

Member of the National Assembly of Pakistan
- In office 13 August 2018 – 2 August 2020
- Constituency: NA-69 (Sialkot-IV)
- In office 1 June 2013 – 31 May 2018
- Constituency: NA-113 (Sialkot-IV)

Personal details
- Born: 2 February 1942 Sialkot, Punjab, British India
- Died: 2 August 2020 (aged 78)
- Party: PMLN (2013-2020)
- Children: Syed Atta ul Hassan

Pir Syed Iftikhar Ul Hassan Shah (Urdu: سید افتخار الحسن; 2 February 1942 – 2 August 2020), also known as Zahray Shah, was a Pakistani politician who was a member of the National Assembly of Pakistan, since August 2018. Previously he was a member of the National Assembly from June 2013 to May 2018.

== Early life ==
He was born on 2 February 1942, in Sialkot, Punjab to Syed family and was a descendant of the Islamic saint Muhammad Channan Shah Nuri.

== Political career ==
Shah was a member of the Pakistan Muslim League (N) (PML-N). He was a member of the Provincial Assembly of the Punjab in 1990. He was elected as a Member of the National Assembly of Pakistan for Daska in 1993 and again in 1998. Later, he was elected to the National Assembly of Pakistan as a candidate of the PML-N from Constituency NA-113 (Sialkot-IV) in 2013 Pakistani general election. He received 118,192 votes and defeated a candidate of Pakistan Tehreek-e-Insaf (PTI).

In October 2017, he was appointed as chairperson of the National Assembly's standing committees on postal services.

He was re-elected to the National Assembly as a candidate of PML-N from Constituency NA-75 (Sialkot-IV) in the 2018 Pakistani general election. He received 101,617 votes and defeated Ali Asjad Malhi, a candidate of PTI.

== Death ==
He died on 2 August 2020, at the age of 78.
