= Pakistan Ka Matlab Kya La Ilaha Illallah =

Pakistani political slogan

Pakistan ka matlab kya, La Illaha Illal Allah. (Urdu: پاکستان کا مطلب کیا لاالہ الا اللہ — ; lit. What does Pakistan mean?... There is no God but Allah) was a Pakistan Movement couplet and political slogan coined in 1943 by the Sialkot-born Urdu poet Asghar Sodai.

The slogan became a battle cry and greeting for the Muslim League, which was struggling for an independent country for the Muslims of South Asia, when World War II ended and the Pakistan independence movement geared up. This slogan shows the Islamic identity of Pakistan too. In the present day, this slogan is mainly used by Pakistani Islamic religio-political parties in their rallies.

== See also ==
- Pakistan Zindabad
- Pakistan Movement
- Pakistani nationalism
- Islamisation in Pakistan
