= Muhammad Jewan Shah Naqvi =

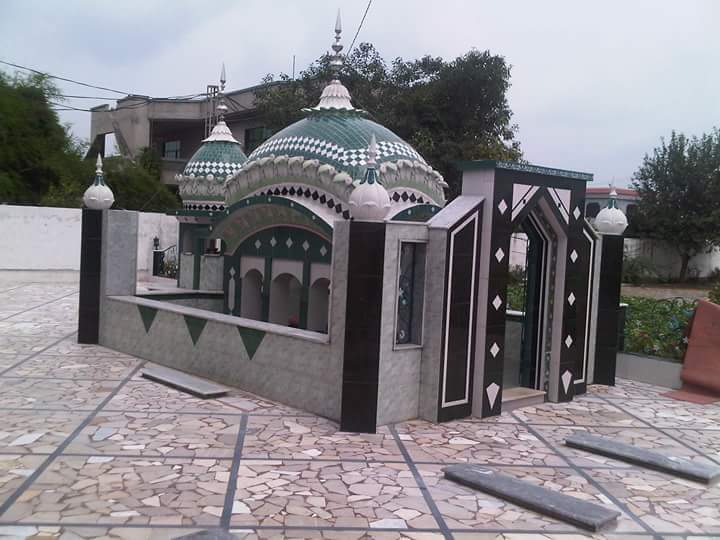
- Tomb of Muhammad Jewan Shah Naqvi
- Died: Allo Mahar Shareef, Punjab

Muhammad Jewan Shah Naqvi was an Islamic saint of Allo Mahar, a village and union council of Daska Tehsil, Sialkot District in Punjab, Pakistan.

== Life ==
He was the great-grandson of the emperor of Kharasan. It has been recorded that the first of the ancestors of Muhammad Channan Shah, who came to Allo Mahar, was Syed Muhammad Jewan Shah Naqvi Sarkar, who came to South Asia with a contingent of other religious Sufi leaders upon the establishment of Islamic rule in India from the Middle-East. He traces his roots to the first Arab Shaikhs descending from Muhammad through the lineage of Husayn and so he is a Sayyed. The term Shah present in his name is derived from the Persian root for leader which most members of Muhammad's family obtained upon propagating the message of Islam in Persia after his death.

== Descendants ==
His son Amir Shah was a saint and spiritual leader of the Naqvis of Allo Mahar. His grandson Muhammad Channan Shah Nuri was a scholar, saint, and preacher in South Asia. He founded the Aminia branch of the Sunni Naqshbandi order. He preached in South Asia and brought non-Muslims into the fold of Islam.

== Death ==
His death date is unknown, but his death anniversary is celebrated in Allo Mahar on 21 October.

== See also ==
- Allo Mahar
- Muhammad Amin Shah Sani
- Faiz-ul Hassan Shah
- Khalid Hasan Shah
- Sahabzada Syed Murtaza Amin
