= Sahabzada Syed Murtaza Amin =

Pakistani politician

Member of the National Assembly of Pakistan
- In office 2008–2013
- Constituency: NA-113 (Sialkot-IV)

Personal details
- Spouse: Syeda Nosheen Iftikhar
- Parent: Khalid Hasan Shah (father)

Sahabzada Syed Murtaza Amin is a Pakistani politician who had been a member of the National Assembly of Pakistan from 2008 to 2013.

== Political career ==
He ran for the seat of the National Assembly of Pakistan from Constituency NA-112 (Sialkot-III) as a candidate of Pakistan Muslim League (N) (PML-N) in the 2002 Pakistani general election, but was unsuccessful. He received 41,251 votes and lost the seat to Umar Ahmad Ghuman, a candidate of Pakistan Muslim League (Q) (PML-Q).

He was elected to the National Assembly from Constituency NA-113 (Sialkot-IV) as a candidate of PML-N in the 2008 Pakistani general election. He received 77,819 votes and defeated Ali Asjad Malhi, a candidate of PML-Q.
