= Khalid Hasan Shah =

Islamic religious leader (1934–1991)

Jansheen-e-Khateeb-ul-Islam جانشین خطيب الإسلام Syed Khalid Hassan Shah سيد خالد حسن شاه
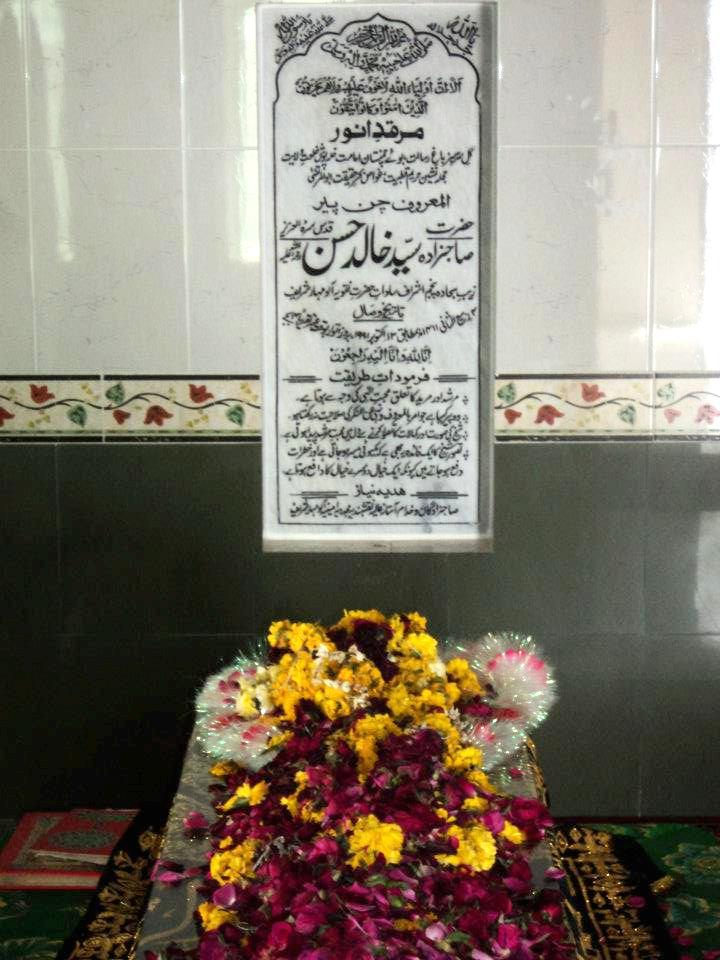
- His grave along with grave stone with his name written in urdu

Personal life
- Born: Khalid Hassan Shah; 1934 Allo Mahar Shareef, Pakistan
- Died: 13 October 1991 (aged 56–57) Allo Mahar
- Resting place: Allo Mahar
- Main interest(s): Hadith, Oratory, Tasawwuf, Islamic Philosophy

Religious life
- Religion: Islam
- Denomination: Sunni
- Lineage: Husayn
- Jurisprudence: Hanafi
- Creed: Maturidi

Muslim leader
- Influenced by: Ahmad Sirhindi, Muhammad Channan Shah Nuri, Syed Faiz-ul Hassan Shah Imam Jalal al-Din al-Suyuti, Ahmed Rida Khan, Jalal ad-Din Muhammad Rumi, Muhammad Amin Shah Sani, Muhammad Amin Shah Sani

Leader of the Naqshbandia Mujadadia Aminia
- In office 22 February 1984 – 13 October 1991
- Preceded by: Syed Faiz-ul Hassan Shah
- Succeeded by: Sahabzada Syed Murtaza Amin

Khalid Hasan Shah was an Islamic religious leader and an exponent of modern Naqshbandi Sufism.

== Birth ==
He was born in Allo Mahar, Pakistan. His father was Faiz-ul Hassan Shah.

== Education ==
He gained secular knowledge during the day, and in the evening he studied Islam at the local maktab, where he learned the basics of Islamic law, jurisprudence, the Hadith, and Qur'anic exegesis. He passed a B.A. at Murray College, Sialkot. He received his elementary education and lessons in Urdu from his father, logic and philosophy from his grandfather.

== Religious career ==
He lectured throughout Pakistan, and struggled for the establishment of Islamic law in Pakistan. He held the seat of his father as a debater in 1984 and worked for eight years. He joined Majlis-e-Tahaffuz-e-Khatme Nabuwwat and lead protests against Ahmadiyya Movement.

== Death ==
He died in 1992, and was buried in Allo Mahar beside his father.

== Family ==
He had one son and two daughters. His son, Sahabzada Syed Murtaza Amin, is also an orator of Islam lecturing in different parts of world.

== See also ==
- Allo Mahar
- Muhammad Jewan Shah Naqvi
- Muhammad Channan Shah Nuri
- Muhammad Amin Shah Sani
- Faiz-ul Hassan Shah
- Sahabzada Syed Murtaza Amin
