= Muhammad Channan Shah Nuri =

Punjabi Sufi saint and scholar (1789–1890)

shamsh ul Hind حضرت شمش الہند Syed Muhammad Channan Shah Nuri سيد محمد چنن شاه نوری
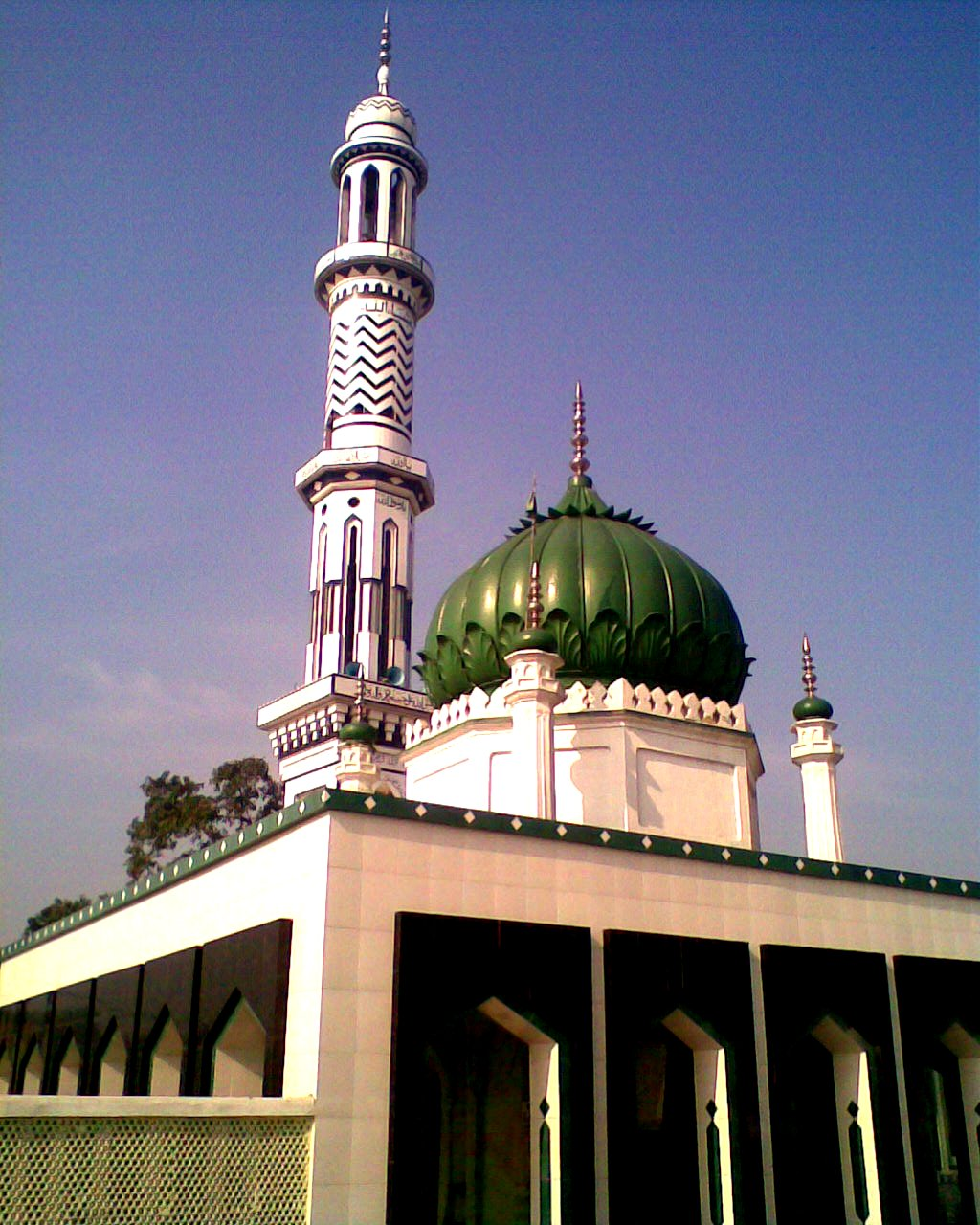
- Tomb of Syed Muhammad Channan Shah in Allo Mahar, Pakistan
- Title: Qutab al Aqtab, Peeran e peer, Zubdat ul-Arfeen, Abu al-Ameen

Personal life
- Born: 1789 Allo Mahar, British India
- Died: 1890 (aged 100–101)
- Main interest(s): Fiqh, Tafsir, Sunnah, Hadith, Sharia, ʿAqīdah, Seerah, Mantiq, Islamic philosophy, Tasawwuf

Religious life
- Religion: Islam
- Denomination: Sunni
- Jurisprudence: Hanafi
- Tariqa: Naqshbandia
- Creed: Sufism
- Movement: Barelvi

founder of the Naqshbandia Mujadadia Aminia
- In office 1815–1890
- Succeeded by: Muhammad Amin Shah Sani

Muhammad Channan Shah Nuri (1789 – 1890) was an Islamic scholar, saint, and preacher in South Asia. He founded the Aminia branch of the Sunni Naqshbandi order. He preached Islam in South Asia and brought non-Muslims into the fold of Islam. His adherents call themselves Naqshbandi mujadadi amini or Maharvi or just Naqshbandi, since Syed Channan Shah belonged to the Naqshbandi order.

== Ancestors ==
The first ancestor of Muhammad Channan Shah, who came to Allo Mahar was Muhammad Jewan Shah Naqvi, well known by the pen-name of Shair Sawar Sarkar. Sarkar came to South Asia with a contingent of other religious Sufi leaders upon the establishment of Islamic rule in India from the Middle East. He is a 23rd-line Line Descendant of Bhakhri Syed, Mohammad Al Makki bin Shuja bin Ibrahim al Jawwadi Naqvi al Bukhari. He traces his roots to the first Arab Shaikhs descending from the family of Muhammad through the lineage of Imam-al-Husayn through Imam Ali an Naqi and so he is a Sayyed. The term Shah present in his name is derived from the Persian root for leader which most members of Muhammad's family obtained upon propagating the message of Islam in Persia after his death. Syed Muhammad Channan Shah was the son of Syed Muhammad Ramazan Shah Maharvi who was the son of Syed Jewan Shah. As a child, he showed a propensity towards spirituality.

== Descendants ==
After Muhammad Channan Shah Nuri's death, his son Muhammad Amin Shah Sani was the leader of Maharvis. He instructed his son to lead his life according to the rules of Islam and later on the naqshbandia order of Syed Channan Shah was named Naqshbandia Mujadadia Aminia after his son Syed Amin Shah due to his devotion to this order. Later on, Syed Muhammad Amin Shah was succeeded by his son Syed Muhammad Hussain Shah, who was an honorary majastrate in Sialkot and was a great Islamic saint of his time. During his tenure, the Naqshbandi Amini chain flourished so much, his two famous caliphs are famous the world over, Khawja Rukn Udin Maharvi(Pir of Gujjranwala and Khawja Molvi Nor udin Pir of Gorala Shrif). After the death of Muhammad Hussain Shah, his son, Syed Faiz-ul Hassan Shah became the spiritual leader of the Allo Mahar syed family and spiritual master of millions of murids of Allo Mahar shrif Dargah. He made hundreds of speeches for the cause of the separate homeland of Muslims in India. After Pakistan came into being, he argued for the establishment of Islamic laws there. He was given a Government award for his participation in the 1965 war. He was the President of Jamiat Ulamaye Pakistan, Pakistan for ten years, and of Jamiatul Mashaikh Pakistan until his death. He was also President of Anjman Naqshbandi Mujaddidi, Pakistan.

After the death of Faiz ul Hasan Shah, his son Khalid Hasan Shah became the saint of Allo Mahar. He traveled to every part of Pakistan for the preaching of Islam. Pir Syed Khalid Hasan Shah died in 1991 and Pir Syed Murtaza Amin Shah became the spiritual leader of the Syed family of Allo Mahar Sharif.Sahabzada Syed Murtaza Amin was elected as a member from Sialkot in the 2008 Pakistani general election.

== Ijaza ==
He received teaching licenses in Naqshbandi Islamic disciplines from scholars including Kawaja Pir Nur Muhammad Chorahi pir of CHURA shrief (Attak)) and Kawja Hadi Namdar Shah pir of Nathyal Sharif. He has instructed numerous courses on various subjects, including the Arabic language, tazkiyah, shariah. He was obediente to his Pir, obeying every order assigned to him by his master, he used to visit his master regularly.

== Gravesite ==
The grave of Channan Shah is situated in Allo Mahar, Tehsil Daska, district Sialkot, Pakistan. His burial place is open for anyone to visit. The part of the land on which his grave has been buried belongs to the territory of Allo Mahar. There his tomb was built. His death anniversary Urs is held at this place every year on 23 March and 21 October. It starts on the morning of the twenty-third and lasts for two days. The main gathering is at night when there are lectures of scholars of Islam not only from Pakistan and India but also from the whole world.

== See also ==
- Allo Mahar
- Syed Muhammad Jewan Shah Naqvi
- Muhammad Amin Shah Sani
- Syed Faiz-ul Hassan Shah
- Khalid Hasan Shah
- Sahabzada Syed Murtaza Amin
