= Faiz-ul Hassan Shah =

Pakistani Islamic scholar (1911–1984)

Hazrat-e-Khatib-ul-Islam حضرت خطيب الإسلام Faiz-ul Hassan Shah سيد فیض الحسن شاه
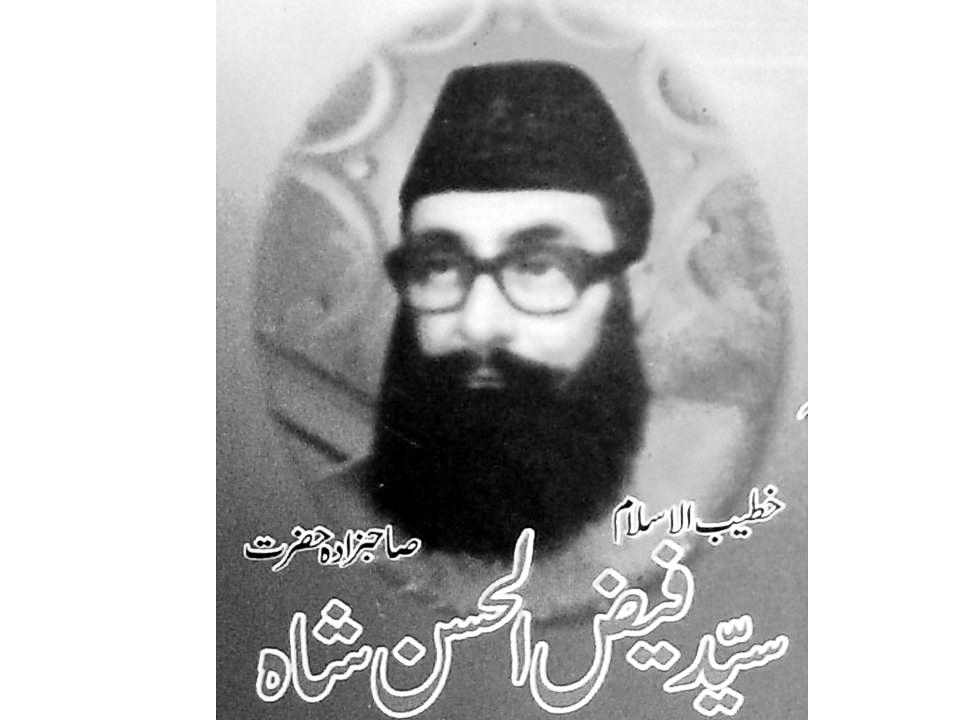
- Faiz-ul Hasan Shah, 4th President of Jamiat Ulema-e-Pakistan

Personal life
- Born: Faiz ul Hassan Shah; 1911 Allo Mahar, Punjab, British India
- Died: 22 February 1984 (aged 72–73) Allo Mahar, Punjab, Pakistan
- Resting place: Allo Mahar, Punjab, Pakistan
- Main interest(s): Hadith, Oratory, Tasawwuf, Islamic Philosophy

Religious life
- Religion: Islam
- Denomination: Sunni
- Lineage: Husayn
- Jurisprudence: Hanafi
- Creed: Ahl as-Sunnah wa’l-Jamā‘h

Muslim leader
- Influenced by: Ahmad Sirhindi, Muhammad Channan Shah Nuri, Imam Jalal al-Din al-Suyuti, Ahmed Rida Khan, Jalal ad-Din Muhammad Rumi

Leader of the Naqshbandia Mujadadia Aminia
- In office 1932 – 22 February 1984
- Preceded by: Syed Muhammad Hussain Shah
- Succeeded by: Syed Iftikhar ul Hassan Khalid Hasan Shah

Faiz-ul Hassan Shah, known by some as Khatib-ul-Islam, was a Pakistani Islamic religious scholar, orator, poet, and writer.

== Political and social contribution ==
He was president of Jamiat Ulema-e-Pakistan for ten years, and struggled to establish Islamic reforms in Pakistan. He was also a provincial president of Majlis-e-Ahrar-ul-Islam.

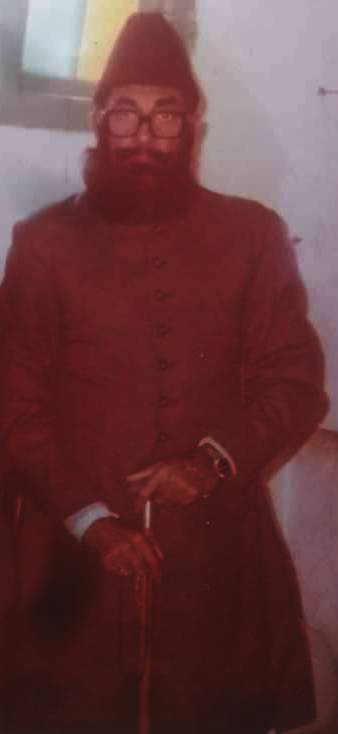
Khateeb ul Islam Syed Faiz ul Hassan Shah

== Religious and academic work ==
In 1932, after the death of his father, he became a religious leader in the village of Allo Mahar. He began leading Friday prayers and teaching the congregation of Allo Mahar in different parts of the Indian subcontinent and became a famous orator. He contributed to the Tahreek-e-Tahaffuz-e-Khatm-e-Nubuwwat, which is an organization created to preserve the Islamic tenet of Finality of Prophethood. He led the movement in the days of British rule in India against Ahmadis. For 20 years he led the Eid prayer in the police line at Gujranwala. He visited Karachi as a president of Jamiat Ulma e Pakistan and made his historic speech which was highly appreciated by all scholars at that time.

== Books ==
Faiz-ul Hassan Shah authored several books and poetry collections focusing on Islamic teachings, spirituality, the defense of the finality of Prophethood, and the promotion of Sunni beliefs. His works also include compilations of his speeches and religious poetry. Notable books include:

- ختم نبوت اور ہماری ذمہ داریاں, Finality of Prophethood and Our Responsibilities — a passionate defense of the belief in the finality of Prophethood and a call to action for Muslims.
- خطباتِ فیضی, The Sermons of Faizi — a collection of his powerful and eloquent speeches on various religious and moral topics.
- اسلام اور موجودہ مسائل, Islam and Contemporary Issues — essays addressing modern challenges in light of Islamic teachings.
- نعتیہ کلام, Poetry in Praise of the Prophet — his collection of *na‘at* poetry, expressing devotion to the Prophet Muhammad.
- احیائے سنت, Revival of the Sunnah — writings on the importance of following the Sunnah in everyday life.

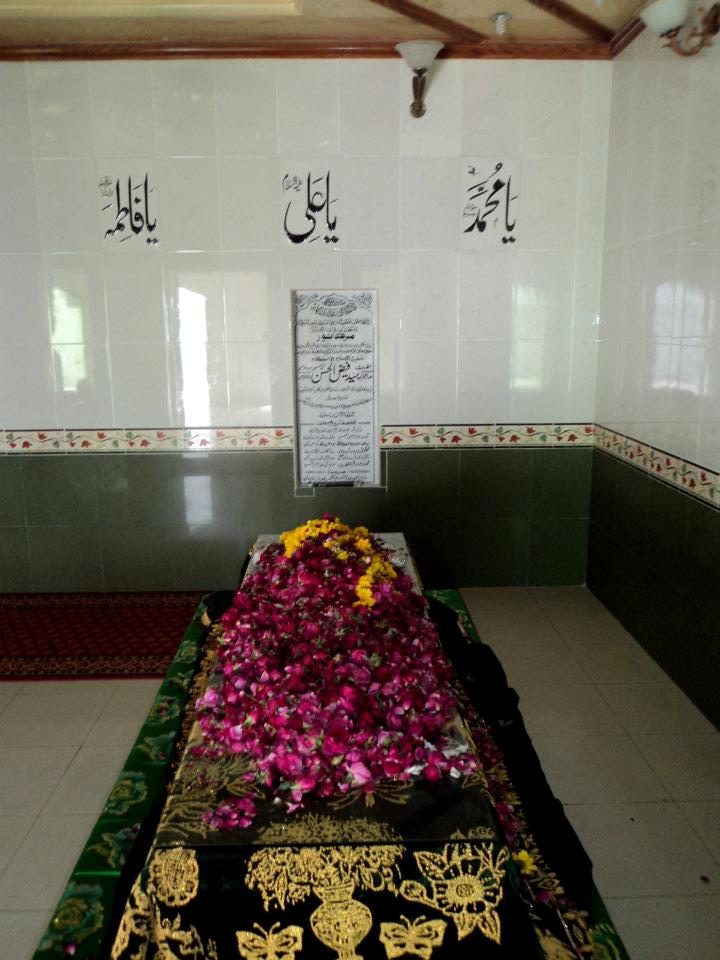
Faiz ul Hasan Shah's grave

== See also ==
- Allo Mahar
- Syed Muhammad Jewan Shah Naqvi
- Pir Syed Muhammad Channan Shah Nuri
- Muhammad Amin Shah Sani
- Pir Syed Khalid Hasan Shah
- Sahabzada Syed Murtaza Amin
