= Muhammad Amin Shah Sani =

Sufi scholar from Pakistan belonging to the Nahbandi order

Coordinates: 30°12′02″N 71°28′35″E

Khwaja e Saani حضرت خواجہ ثاني Muhammad Ameen Shah سيد محمد امين شاه
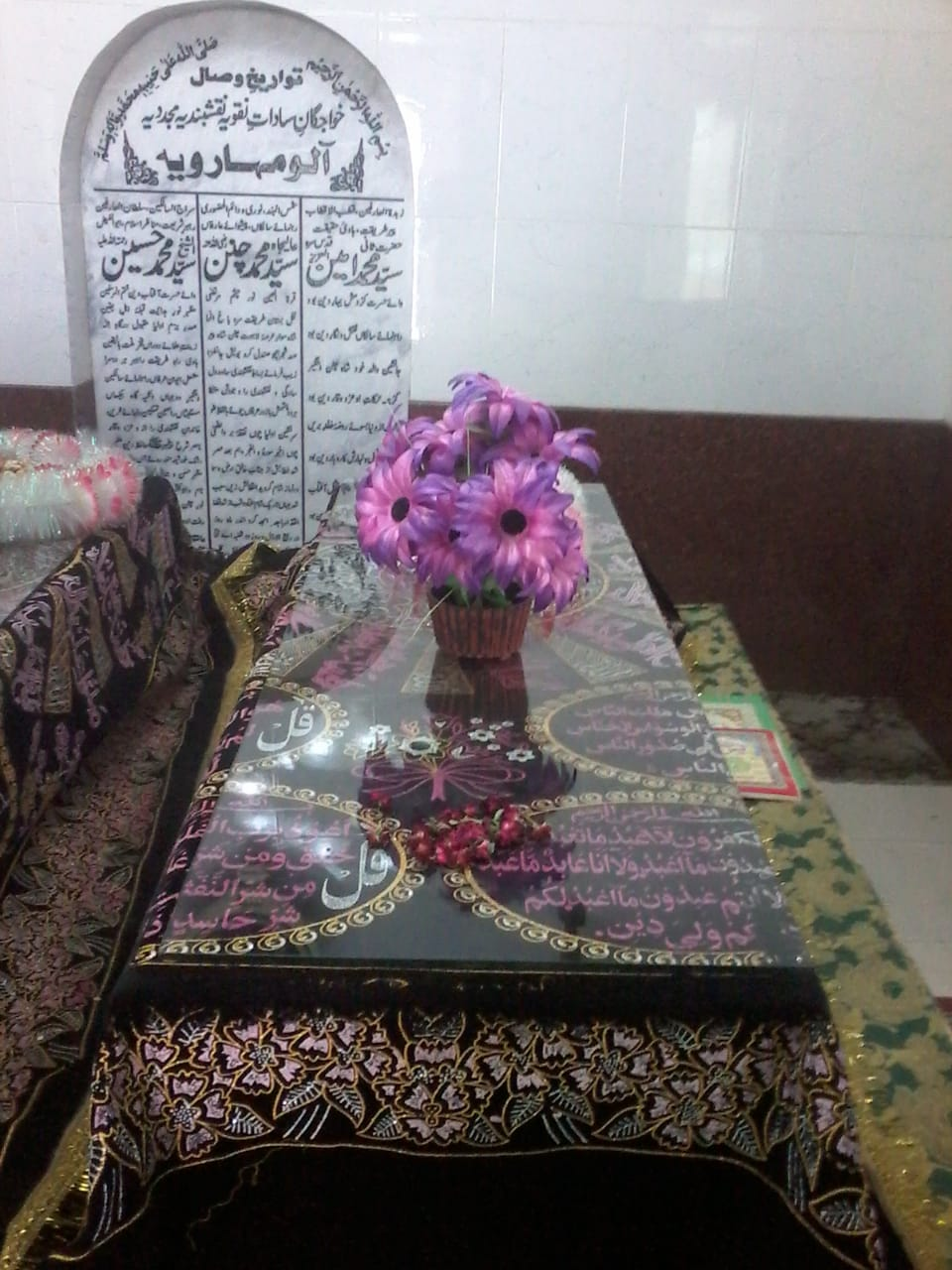
- His grave with an epitaph in the Persian language.

Personal life
- Born: Muhammad Amin Shah; 1829; Allo Mahar Shareef, Pakistan.
- Died: 23 March 1913; Allo Mahar
- Resting place: Allo Mahar
- Children: Pir Syed Muhammad Hussain Shah (son)
- Parent: Pir Syed Muhammad Channan Shah Nuri (father)

Religious life
- Religion: Islam
- Lineage: Hussaini

Leader of the Naqshbandia Mujadadia Aminia
- In office 1890 – 23rd of March 1913
- Preceded by: Muhammad Channan Shah Nuri
- Succeeded by: Syed Muhammad Hussain Shah

Muhammad Amin Shah Sani was a Sufi scholar from Pakistan belonging to the Naqshbandi order. He is known as a Hanafi scholar and saint. He received his early Qur'anic education at the Khankah Allo Mahar. The first of his ancestors in Allo Mahar was Muhammad Jewan Shah Naqvi, well known by the pen-name of Shair Sawar Sarkar. He traces his roots to the first Arab Shaikhs descending from Muhammad through the lineage of Husayn.

== Family ==
His father Muhammad Channan Shah Nuri was a scholar, saint, and preacher in South Asia. He preached in South Asia and brought non-Muslims into the fold of Islam. His son Muhammad Hussain Shah succeeded him.

== Sufi order ==
He belonged to the Naqshbandi Sufi order and was one of the disciples of Bahaudin Naqshband.

== Shrine ==
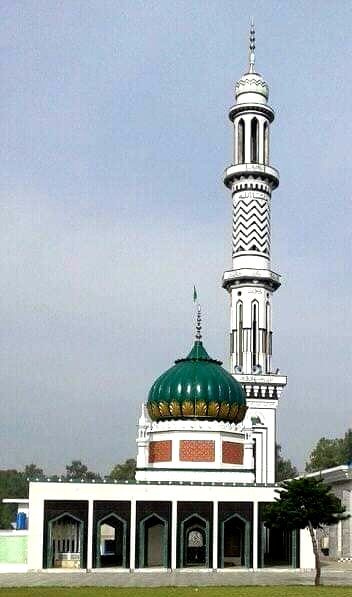
Tomb of Pir Syed Muhammad Amin Shah Sani Allo Maharvi

His mausoleum is in Allo Mahar. It is a square which is surmounted by a hemispherical dome. Many pilgrims visit it on his death anniversary.

== See also ==
- Allo Mahar
- Muhammad Jewan Shah Naqvi
- Muhammad Channan Shah Nuri
- Syed Faiz-ul Hassan Shah
- Khalid Hasan Shah
- Sahabzada Syed Murtaza Amin
