= PP-53 Sialkot-X =

Constituency of the Punjabi Provincial Legislature, Pakistan

- Constituency for the Provincial Assembly of Punjab
- Region: Sambrial Tehsil (partly) Sialkot Tehsil (partly) of Sialkot District

Current constituency
- Created from: PP-124 Sialkot-V (2002–2018); PP-45 Sialkot-XI (2018-2023)

PP-53 Sialkot-X (پی پی-53، سيالكوٹ-10) is a Constituency of Provincial Assembly of Punjab.

== General elections 2024 ==
Provincial election 2024: PP-53 Sialkot-X
Party	Candidate	Votes	%	±%
PML(N)	Rana Abdul Sattar	59,310	42.62	
Independent	Malik Jamshed Ghias (Note: Filed nomination papers as PTI candidate but ECP allowed him to run as an Independent)	58,365	41.94	
TLP	Choudhry Tafseer Ahmad	13,260	9.53	
PPP	Malik Tahir Akhtar	2,520	1.81	
Others	Others (nineteen candidates)	5,696	4.10	
Turnout		141,827	55.38	
Total valid votes		139,151	98.11	
Rejected ballots		2,676	1.89	
Majority		765	0.68	
Registered electors		256,113		
hold				

== General elections 2018 ==
Provincial election 2018: PP-45 Sialkot-XI
Party	Candidate	Votes	%	±%
PML(N)	Rana Abdul Sattar	53,767	50.89	
PTI	Malik Jamshed Ghias	35,946	34.03	
TLP	Waqar Hassan Awan	11,549	10.93	
AAT	ijaz Ahmed	1,697	1.61	
Others	Others (three candidates)	2,688	2.55	
Turnout		108,309	57.37	
Total valid votes		105,647	97.54	
Rejected ballots		2,662	2.46	
Majority		17,821	16.86	
Registered electors		188,778		

== General elections 2013 ==
Provincial election 2013 : PP-124 Sialkot-IV
Party	Candidate	Votes	%	±%
PML(N)	Rana Abdul Sattar	55,565	57.64	
PTI	Malik Jamshed Ghias	23,348	24.22	
PPP	Malik Tahir Akhtar Awan	7,600	7.88	
JI	Muhammad Zia Ullah	6,991	7.25	
MWM	Syed Irfan Haider	1,141	1.18	
Others	Others (seven candidates)	1,763	1.82	
Turnout		98,617	54.82	
Total valid votes		96,408	97.76	
Rejected ballots		2,209	2.24	
Majority		32,217	33.42	
Registered electors		179,902		

== General elections 2008 ==
Provincial election 2008: PP-124 Sialkot-IV
Party	Candidate	Votes	%	±%
PML(N)	Rana Abdul Sattar Bin Rana Shahmim Ahmed Khan	36,078	49.53	
PPP	Malik Tahir Akhtar	20,226	27.77	
PML(Q)	Mian Mohammad Riaz.	16,265	22.33	
Others	Others	268	0.37	
Turnout		75,527	52.69	
Total valid votes		72,837	96.44	
Rejected ballots		2,690	3.56	
Majority		15,852	21.76	
Registered electors		143,342		

== See also ==
- PP-52 Sialkot-IX
- PP-54 Narowal-I
