= NA-74 Sialkot-V =

Constituency of the National Assembly of Pakistan

- Constituency for the National Assembly of Pakistan
- Region: Sambrial, Sialkot and Daska Tehsils (partly) of Sialkot District
- Electorate: 469,826

Current constituency
- Party: PTI
- Member: Muhammad Aslam Ghumman
- Created from: NA-112 Sialkot-III

NA-74 Sialkot-V (این اے-74، سيالکوٹ-5) is a constituency for the National Assembly of Pakistan. It mainly comprises the Sambrial Tehsil.

== Members of Parliament ==
=== 2018–2023: NA-76 Sialkot-V ===
Election	Member	Party
2018	Shamim Ahmed	PML (N)

=== 2024–present: NA-74 Sialkot-V ===
Election	Member	Party
2024	Muhammad Aslam Ghumman	PTI

== Election 2002 ==
General elections were held on 10 October 2002. Umar Ahmad of PML-Q won by 68,468 votes and Salman Saif Cheema of PPP got 31,602 votes.

General election 2002: NA-112 Sialkot-III
Party	Candidate	Votes	%	±%
PML(Q)	Umar Ahmad Ghuman	68,468	44.55	
PML(N)	Sahibzada Syed Murtaza Amin	41,251	26.84	
PPP	Salman Saif Ullah Cheema	31,602	20.56	
MMA	Muhammad Amin Javaid	6,761	4.40	
PAT	Muhammad Sharif Ch.	4,477	2.91	
Others	Others (four candidates)	1,139	0.74	
Turnout		159,101	49.03	
Total valid votes		153,701	96.61	
Rejected ballots		5,400	3.39	
Majority		27,217	17.71	
Registered electors		324,531		

== Election 2008 ==
General elections were held on 18 February 2008. Rana Abdul Sattar son of Rana Shamim Ahmed Khan of PML-N won by 92,182 votes against the president of PMLQ Ch Shujaat Hussain.

General election 2008: NA-112 Sialkot-III
Party	Candidate	Votes	%	±%
PML(N)	Rana Abdul Sattar Bin Rana Shamim Ahmed Khan	92,182	55.97	
PML(Q)	Ch. Shujat Hussain	42,713	25.94	
PPP	Sultan Sikandar Ghumman	29,477	17.90	
Others	Others (three candidates)	323	0.19	
Turnout		169,674	56.01	
Total valid votes		164,695	97.07	
Rejected ballots		4,979	2.93	
Majority		49,469	30.03	
Registered electors		302,932		
PML(N) gain from PML(Q)				

== Election 2013 ==
General election 2013 were held on May 11, 2013. Rana Shamim Ahmed Khan won by 129,571 votes and became the member of National Assembly. He also serves as Chairman Standing committee on Interior and narcotics control.

General election 2013: NA-112 Sialkot-III
Party	Candidate	Votes	%	±%
PML(N)	Rana Shamim Ahmed Khan	129,571	63.53	+26.0
PTI	Salman Saif Cheema	37,061	18.17	+18.0
PPP	Chaudhry Ejaz Ahmed Cheema	23,450	11.50	−6.0
Others	Others (seven candidates)	13,860	6.80	N/A
Turnout		209,285	57.65	
Total valid votes		203,942	97.45	
Rejected ballots		5,343	2.55	
Majority		92,510	45.36	
Registered electors		363,004		
PML(N) hold				

== Election 2018 ==
General elections were held on 25 July 2018.

General election 2018: NA-76 Sialkot-V
Party	Candidate	Votes	%	±%
PML(N)	Rana Shamim Ahmed Khan	133,664	49.33	▼14.20
PTI	Muhammad Aslam Ghumman	93,190	34.39	▲16.22
Others	Others (six candidates)	38,100	14.06	
Turnout		270,979	57.68	▲0.38
Rejected ballots		6,025	2.22	
Majority		40,474	14.94	
Registered electors		469,826		
PML(N) hold		Swing	N/A	

== Election 2024 ==
General elections were held on 8 February 2024. Muhammad Aslam Ghumman won with 130,606 votes.

General election 2024: NA-74 Sialkot-V
Party	Candidate	Votes	%	±%
Independent	Muhammad Aslam Ghumman (Note: Filed nomination papers as PTI candidate but ECP allowed him to run as an Independent)	130,606	48.79	▲14.40
PML(N)	Rana Shamim Ahmed Khan	96,018	35.87	▼13.46
TLP	Sajjad Hussain Shah	25,480	9.52	▲3.16
Others	Others (fifteen candidates)	15,561	5.81	
Turnout		273,390	50.68	▼7.00
Total valid votes		267,665	97.91	
Rejected ballots		5,725	2.09	
Majority		34,588	12.92	
Registered electors		539,393		

== See also ==
- NA-73 Sialkot-IV
- NA-75 Narowal-I
