= History of Sialkot =

History of Sialkot (Punjabi: سیالکوٹ دی تریخ; Urdu: تاريخ سیالکوٹ), the capital of Sialkot District, is a city situated in the north-east of the Punjab province in Pakistan at the feet of the snow-covered peaks of Kashmir near the Chenab river. The city is about 125 km (78 mi) north-west of Lahore and only a few kilometres from Jammu in India.

== Founding ==
Sialkot is likely the capital of the Madra Kingdom Sagala, Sakala (Sanskrit: साकला), or Sangala (Ancient Greek: Σάγγαλα) mentioned in the Mahabharata, a Sanskrit epic of ancient India, as occupying a similar area as Greek accounts of Sagala. The city may have been inhabited by the Saka, or Scythians, from Central Asia who had migrated into the Subcontinent. The region was noted in the Mahabharata for the "loose and Bacchanalian" women who lived in the woods there. The city was said to have been located in the Sakaladvipa region between the Chenab and Ravi rivers, now known as the Rechna Doab.

== Greek ==
The Anabasis of Alexander, written by the Roman-Greek historian Arrian, recorded that Alexander the Great captured ancient Sialkot, recorded as Sagala, from the Cathaeans, who had entrenched themselves there. The city had been home to 80,000 residents on the eve of Alexander's invasion, but was razed as a warning against any other nearby cities that might resist his invasion.

== Indo-Greek ==
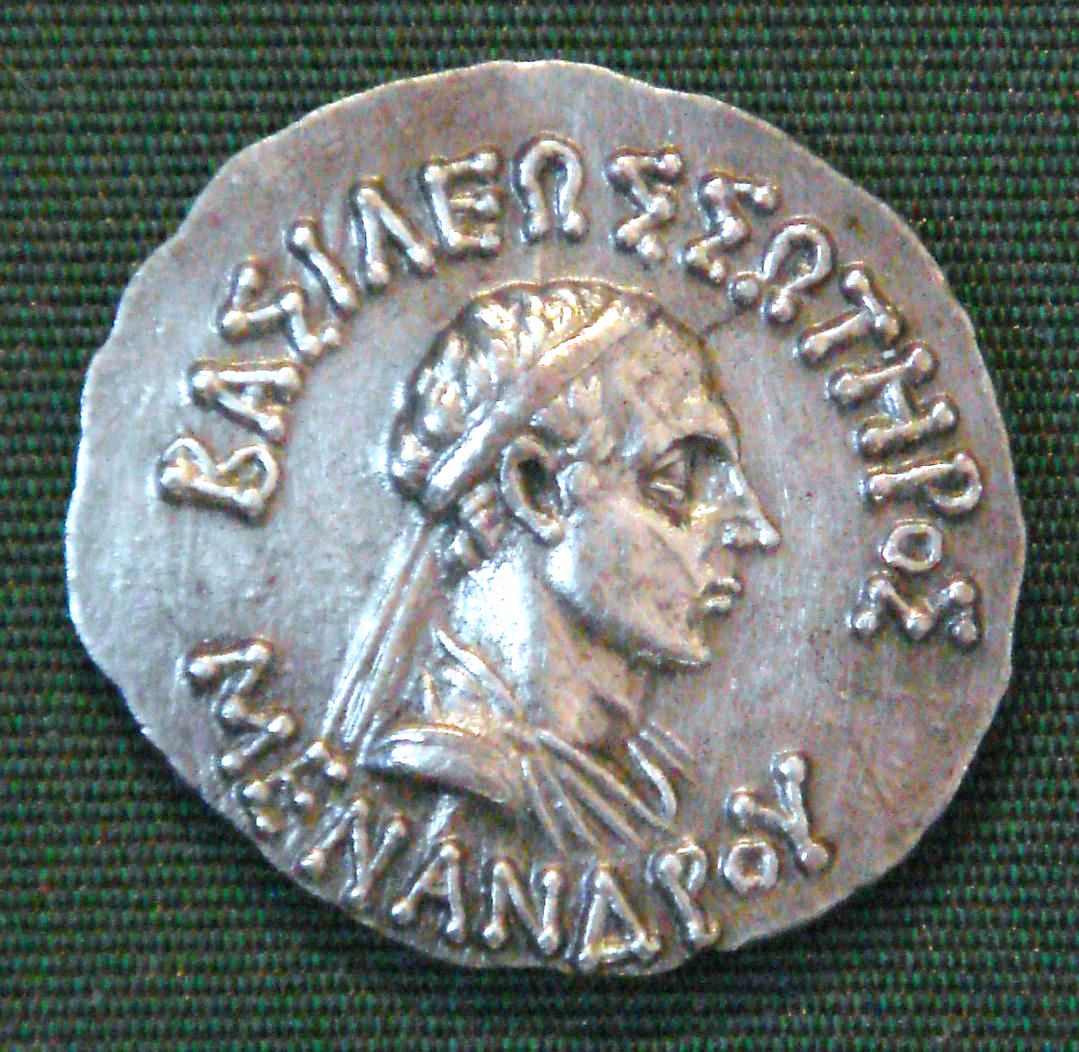
Menander I, founder of the Indo-Greek kingdom, with his capital in Sagala.

The ancient city was rebuilt, and made capital by the Indo-Greek king Menander I of the Euthydemid dynasty, in the 2nd century BCE. The rebuilt city was shifted slightly from the older city, as rebuilding on exactly the same spot was considered inauspicious.

Under Menander's rule, the city greatly prospered as a major trading centre renowned for its silk. Menander embraced Buddhism in Sagala, after an extensive debating with the Buddhist monk Nagasena, as recorded in the Buddhist text Milinda Panha. the text offers an early description of the city's cityscape and status as a prosperous trade centre with numerous green spaces. Following his conversion, Sialkot developed as a major centre for Buddhist thought.

Ancient Sialkot was recorded by Ptolemy in his 1st century CE work, Geography, in which he refers to the city as Euthymedia (Εύθυμέδεια).

== Alchon Huns ==
Around 460 CE, the Alchon Huns invaded the region from Central Asia, forcing the ruling family of nearby Taxila to seek refuge in Sialkot. Sialkot itself was soon captured, and the city was made capital of the Alchon Huns around 515, during the reign of Toramana. During the reign of his son, Mihirakula, the empire reached its zenith. The Alchon Huns were defeated in 528 by a coalition of princes led by Prince Yashodharman

== Late antiquity ==
The city was visited by the Chinese traveller Xuanzang in 633, who recorded the city's name as She-kie-lo. Xuanzang reported that the city had been rebuilt approximately 15 li, or 2.5 miles, away from the city ruined by Alexander the Great. During this time, Sialkot served as the political nucleus of the Punjab region. The city was then invaded in 643 by princes from Jammu, who held the city until the Muslim invasions during the medieval era.

== Medieval ==
Around the year 1000, Sialkot began to decline in importance as the nearby city of Lahore rose to prominence. Following to fall of Lahore to the Ghaznavid Empire in the early 11th century, the capital of the Hindu Shahi empire was shifted from Lahore to Sialkot. Ghaznavid expansion in northern Punjab encouraged local Khokhar tribes to stop paying tribute to the Rajas of Jammu.

Sialkot became a part of the medieval Sultanate of Delhi after Muhammad Ghauri conquered Punjab in 1185. Ghauri was unable to conquer the larger city of Lahore, but deemed Sialkot important enough to warrant a garrison. He also extensively repaired the Sialkot Fort around the time of his conquest of Punjab, and left the region in charge of Hussain Churmali while he returned to Ghazni. Sialkot was then quickly laid siege to by Khokhar tribesmen, and Khusrau Malik, the last Ghaznavid sultan, though he was defeated during Ghauri's return to Punjab in 1186.

In the 1200s, Sialkot was the only area of western Punjab that was ruled by the Mamluk Sultanate in Delhi. The area had been captured by the Ghauri prince Yildiz, but was recaptured by Sultan Iltutmish in 1217. Around 1223, Jalal al-Din Mangburni, the last king of the Khwarazmian dynasty of Central Asia that had fled invasion of Genghis Khan there, briefly captured Sialkot and Lahore, before being driven out by Iltutmish's forces towards Uch Sharif. During the 13th century, Imam Ali-ul-Haq, Sialkot's most revered Sufi warrior-saint, arrived from Arabia, and began his missionary work in the region that successfully converted large numbers of Hindus to Islam, thereby transforming Sialkot into a largely Muslim city. The saint later died in battle, and is revered as a martyr.

Sialkot fell to Shaikha Khokhar around 1414. Sialkot's population continued to grow in the 1400s under the rule of Sultan Bahlul Lodi, who had granted custodianship of the city to Jammu's Raja Biram Dev, after he helped Lodhi defeat the Khokhars. Sialkot was sacked during the Lodhi period by Malik Tazi Bhat of Kashmir, who attacked Sialkot after the governor of Punjab, Tatar Khan, had left the city undefended during one of his military campaigns.

Sialkot was captured by armies of the Babur in 1520, when the Mughal commander Usman Ghani Raza advanced towards Delhi during the initial conquest of Babur. Babur recorded a battle with Gujjar raiders, who had attacked Sialkot, and allegedly mistreated its inhabitants. In 1525–1526, Alam Khan, uncle of Sultan Ibrahim Lodi, invaded from Afghanistan, and was able to capture Sialkot with the aid of Mongol forces.

== Mughal ==
During the early Mughal era, Sialkot was made part of the subah, or "province," of Lahore. The Mughal commander, Usman Ghani Raza, advanced towards Delhi by way of Sialkot which capitulated to his armies. In 'Babur Nama', Zaheer-ud-Din Muhammad Babur records:

29th December: We dismounted at Sialkot. If one goes into Hindustan, the Jats and Gujars always pour down in countless hordes from hill and plain for loot in bullock and buffalo. These ill-omened people are senseless oppressors! Previously, their deeds did not concern us because the territory was an enemy's. But they did the same senseless deeds after we had captured it. When we reached Sialkot, they swooped on the poor and needy folk who were coming out of the town to our camp, and stripped them bare. I had the witless brigands apprehended, and ordered a few of them to be cut to pieces.

According to Sikh tradition, Guru Nanak, the founder of Sikhism, visited the city, sometime in the early 16th century. He is said to have met Hamza Ghaus, a prominent Sufi mystic based in Sialkot, at a site now commemorated by the city's Gurdwara Beri Sahib.

During the Akbar era, Sialkot's pargana territory was placed in the jagir custodianship of Raja Man Singh, who would repair the city's fort, and sought to increase its population and develop its economy. In 1580 Yousuf Shah Chak of Kashmir sought refuge in the city during his exile from the Valley of Kashmir. Paper-makers from Kashmir migrated to the city during the Akbar period, and Sialkot later became renowned as the source of the prized Mughal Hariri paper – known for its brilliant whiteness and strength. The city's metalworkers also provided the Mughal crown with much of its weaponry.

During the reign of Jahangir, the post was given to Safdar Khan, who rebuilt the city's fort, and oversaw a further increase in Sialkot's prosperity. Numerous fine houses and gardens were built in the city during the Jehangir period. During the Shah Jahan period, the city was placed under the rule of Ali Mardan Khan.

The last Mughal emperor, Aurangzeb, appointed Ganga Dhar as faujdar of the city until 1654. Rahmat Khan was then placed in charge of the city, and would build a mosque in the city. Under Aurangzeb's reign, Sialkot became known as a great centre of Islamic thought and scholarship, and attracted scholars because of the widespread availability of paper in the city.

Following the decline of the Mughal empire after the death of Emperor Aurangzeb in 1707, Sialkot and its outlying districts were left undefended and forced to defend itself. In 1739, the city was captured by Nader Shah of Persia during his invasion of the Mughal Empire. The city was placed under the governorship of Zakariya Khan, the Mughal Viceroy of Lahore, who in return for the city promised to pay tribute to the Persian crown.

In the wake of the Persian invasion, Sialkot fell under the control of Pashtun powerful families from Multan and Afghanistan – the Kakayzais and Sherwanis. Sialkot was crept upon by Ranjit Deo of Jammu, who pledged nominal allegiance to the Mughal crown in Delhi. Ranjit Deo did not conquer Sialkot city from the Pashtun families which held the city, but switched allegiance to the Pashtun ruler Ahmed Shah Durrani in 1748, effectively ending Mughal influence in Sialkot. The city and three nearby districts were amalgamated into the Durrani Empire.

== Sikh ==
Sikh chieftains of the Bhangi Misl state encroached upon Sialkot, and had gained full control of the Sialkot region by 1786, Sialkot was portioned into 4 quarters, under the control of Sardar Jiwan Singh, Natha Singh, Sahib Singh, and Mohar Singh, who invited the city's dispersed residents back to the city.

The Bhangi rulers engaged in feuds with the neighbouring Sukerchakia Misl state by 1791, and would eventually lose control of the city. The Sikh Empire of Ranjit Singh captured Sialkot from Sardar Jiwan Singh in 1808. Sikh forces then occupied Sialkot until the arrival of the British in 1849.

== British Raj ==
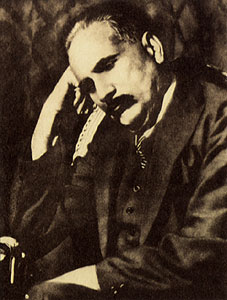
Allama Iqbal, the philosopher-poet credited inspiring the Pakistan Movement, was born in Sialkot in 1877.

Sialkot, along with Punjab as a whole, was captured by the British following their victory over the Sikhs at the Battle of Gujrat in February 1849. During the British era, an official is known as The Resident who would, in theory, advise the Maharaja of Kashmir would reside in Sialkot during the wintertime.

During the Sepoy Mutiny of 1857, the two Bengal regiments based in Sialkot rebelled against the East India Company, while their native servants also took up arms against the British. In 1877, the Sialkot poet Allama Iqbal, who is credited for inspiring the Pakistan Movement, was born into a Kashmiri family that had converted to Islam from Hinduism in the early 1400s. British India's first bagpipe works opened in Sialkot, and today there are 20 pipe bands in the city.

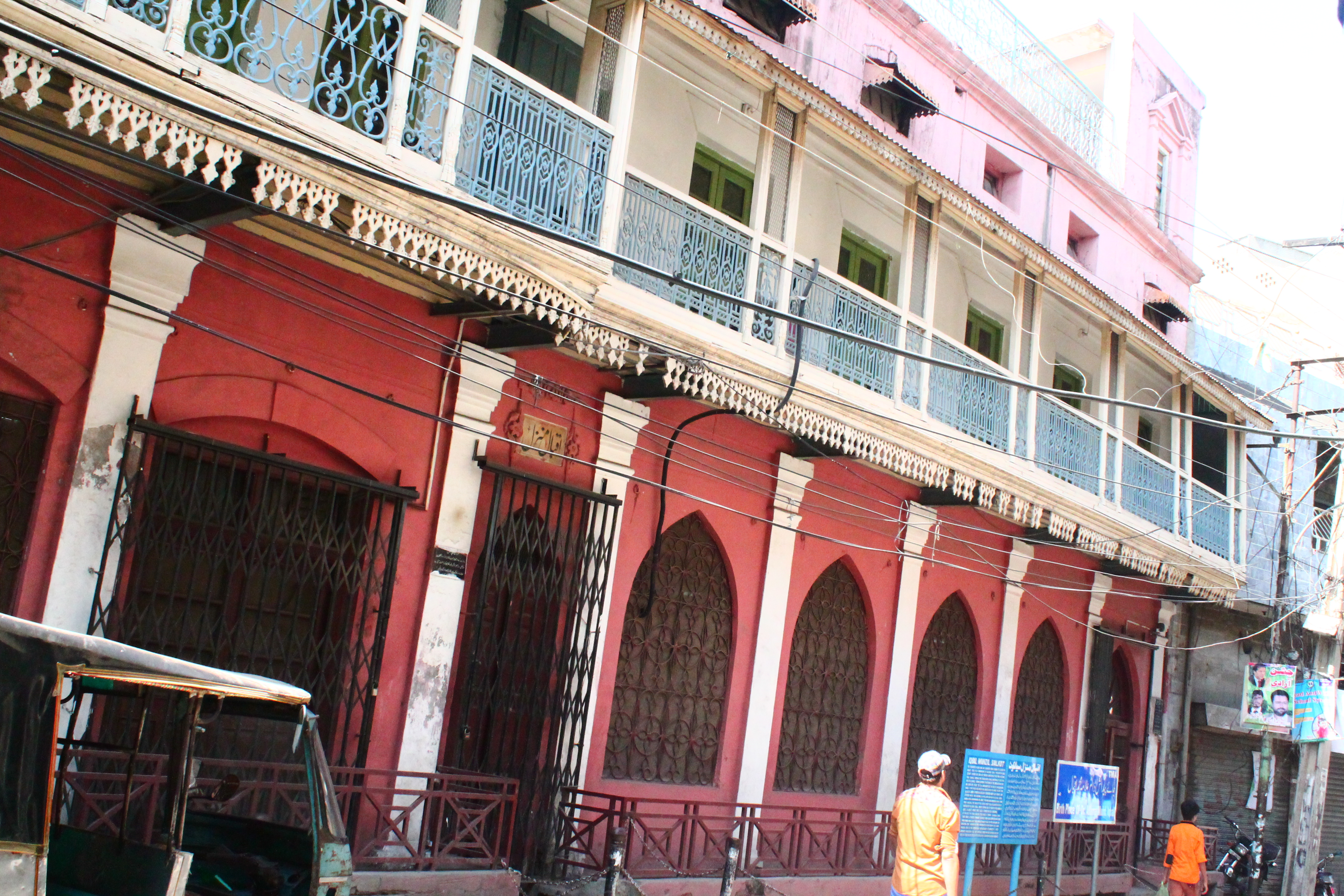
Iqbal Manzil the residence of Allama Iqbal.

Sialkot's modern prosperity began during the colonial era. The city had been known for its paper making and ironworks prior to the colonial era, and became a centre of metalwork in the 1890s. Surgical instruments were being manufactured in Sialkot for use throughout British India by the 1920s. The city also became a centre for sports goods manufacturing for British troops stationed along with the North West Frontier due to the availability of nearby timber reserves.

In 1904, Rising Sons of India (Loyal Orange Lodge No. 899) was established. A branch of the Orange Order, the fraternity practiced Protestantism and Orange heritage. It was primarily made up of Ulster-Scots soldiers serving in the Royal Irish Rifles. The lodge held its meetings in the city's Wesleyan Church buildings.

As a result of the city's prosperity, large numbers of migrants from Jammu region of Jammu and Kashmir came to the city in search of employment. At the end of World War II, the city was considered the second most industrialised in Punjab, after Amritsar. Much of the city's infrastructure was paid for by local taxes, and the city was one of the few in British India to have its own electric utility company.

The first communal riots between Hindus/Sikhs and Muslims took place on 24 June 1946, a day after the resolution calling for the establishment of Pakistan as a separate state. Sialkot remained peaceful for several months while communal riots had erupted in Lahore, Amritsar, Ludhiana, and Rawalpindi. The predominantly Muslim population supported Muslim League and the Pakistan Movement.

While Muslim refugees had poured into the city escaping riots elsewhere, Sialkot's Hindu and Sikh communities began fleeing in the opposite direction towards India. They initially congregated in fields outside the city, where some of Sialkot's Muslims would bid farewell to departing friends. Hindu and Sikh refugees were unable to exit Pakistan towards Jammu on account of conflict in Kashmir, and were instead required to transit via Lahore.

== Modern era ==
After independence in 1947 the Hindu and Sikh minorities migrated to India, while Muslim refugees from India settled in Sialkot. The city had suffered significant losses as a result of communal rioting that erupted because of Partition. 80% of Sialkot's industry had been destroyed or abandoned, and the working capital fell by an estimated 90%. The city was further stressed by the arrival of 200,000 migrants, mostly from Jammu, who had arrived in the city.

Following the demise of industry in the city, the government of West Pakistan prioritised the re-establishment of Punjab's decimated industrial base. The province lead infrastructure projects in the area, and allotted abandoned properties to newly arrived refugees. Local entrepreneurs also rose to fill the vacuum created by the departure of Hindu and Sikh businessmen. By the 1960s, the provincial government laid extensive new roadways in the district, and connected it to trunk roads to link the region to the seaport in Karachi.

During the Indo-Pakistani War of 1965, when Pakistani troops arrived in Kashmir, the Indian Army counterattacked in the Sialkot Sector. The Pakistan Army successfully defended the city and the people of Sialkot came out in full force to support the troops. In 1966, Government of Pakistan awarded a special flag of Hilal-e-Istaqlal to Sialkot, along with Lahore and Sargodha in Indo-Pakistani War of 1965]for showing severe resistance in front of enemy as these cities were target of enemy's advances. Every year on Defence Day, this flag is hoisted in these cities as a symbol of recognition of the will, courage and perseverance of the dwellers of these cities. The armoured battles in the Sialkot sector like the Battle of Chawinda were the most intense since World War II. In 1966, the Government of Pakistan awarded the Hilal-i-Istaqlal to the citizens of Sialkot, Lahore and Sargodha for their courage and bravery during the 1965 war between Pakistan and India.

== See also ==
- Sagala
- Madra Kingdom
- Milinda Panha
- Muhammad Iqbal
