= Imam Ali-ul-Haq =

Sufi saint

Imam Ali al-Haq (الامام علي الحق) lived in the 10th century. He is referenced in a Persian manuscript by Ganesh Das titled "Chār Bāgh-i-Panjāb", an account which is later published by Indu Banga and J. S. Grewal in their book "Early Nineteenth-Century Panjab." Imam Ali al-Haq led an army to Sialkot from Arabia between 970 and 971 A.D. during the Samanid appointment of Bilgetegin. He was killed in Sialkot in a battle with Raja Sahan Pal, who assumed the title of Salbahan the second, in the course of his brothers rule of Sirhind.

Many Muslim associates, who were riding with Imam Ali al-Haq, also lost their lives in the battle, to the sword of Hindu Shahis. Amongst these killed was Syed Sabzwar. After this happened, Sultan Nasir al-Din Sabuktigin of Ghazni invaded the Punjab in 980 A.D. To avenge the Imam, he massacred all the inhabitants, completely devastated the city and demolished the solid walls of its fort.

Imam Ali al-Haq is hailed as a Muslim knight and warrior saint and is referred to as "Shahid awwal", meaning the first martyr (in Punjab), because he was the first person to lead an army to South Asia after the Arab military commander, Muhammad bin Qasim. His efforts not only invited the Ghaznavids but set in motion a long process which culminated in the creation of the Delhi Sultanate.

Imam Ali al-Haq's shrine is situated in Sialkot city at the place where he died. The path leading to his tomb is often lined with numerous pilgrims. The mausoleum complex is a maze of narrow corridors and steps leading to several other tombs of men from his army whose names are not known, including the shrines of pir (holy men). The tomb of Imam Ali-ul-Haq is to the right, through a mirrored gateway and is tiled with Quranic inscriptions and geometric designs.

== See also ==
- List of Sufi saints
- Sufism
