= Sagala =

Historic city in present-day Punjab, Pakistan

Coordinates: 32°30′19″N 74°32′03″E

Sagala, Śākala or Sangala (Ancient Greek: Σάγγαλα) was a city in the northwestern Indian subcontinent, generally identified as the predecessor of the present-day Sialkot in the Pakistani province of Punjab. The city was the capital of the Madra kingdom, and was razed in 326 BC during the Indian campaign of Alexander the Great. In the 2nd century BC, Sagala was made capital of the Indo-Greek kingdom by Menander I. Menander embraced Buddhism after extensive debating with a Buddhist monk, as recorded in the Buddhist text Milinda Panha. Sagala became a major centre for Buddhism under his reign, and prospered as a major trading centre. It was the capital of Mihirakula, as mentioned by Xuanzang in his 7th-century account.

Location of Sagala in the Punjab region of what is now Pakistan

== History ==
Sagala is likely the city of Śākala mentioned in the Mahabharata, a Sanskrit epic of ancient India, as occupying a similar area as Greek accounts of Sagala. The region was noted in the Mahabharata for the "loose and Bacchanalian" women who lived in the woods there.

=== Indian campaign of Alexander the Great ===
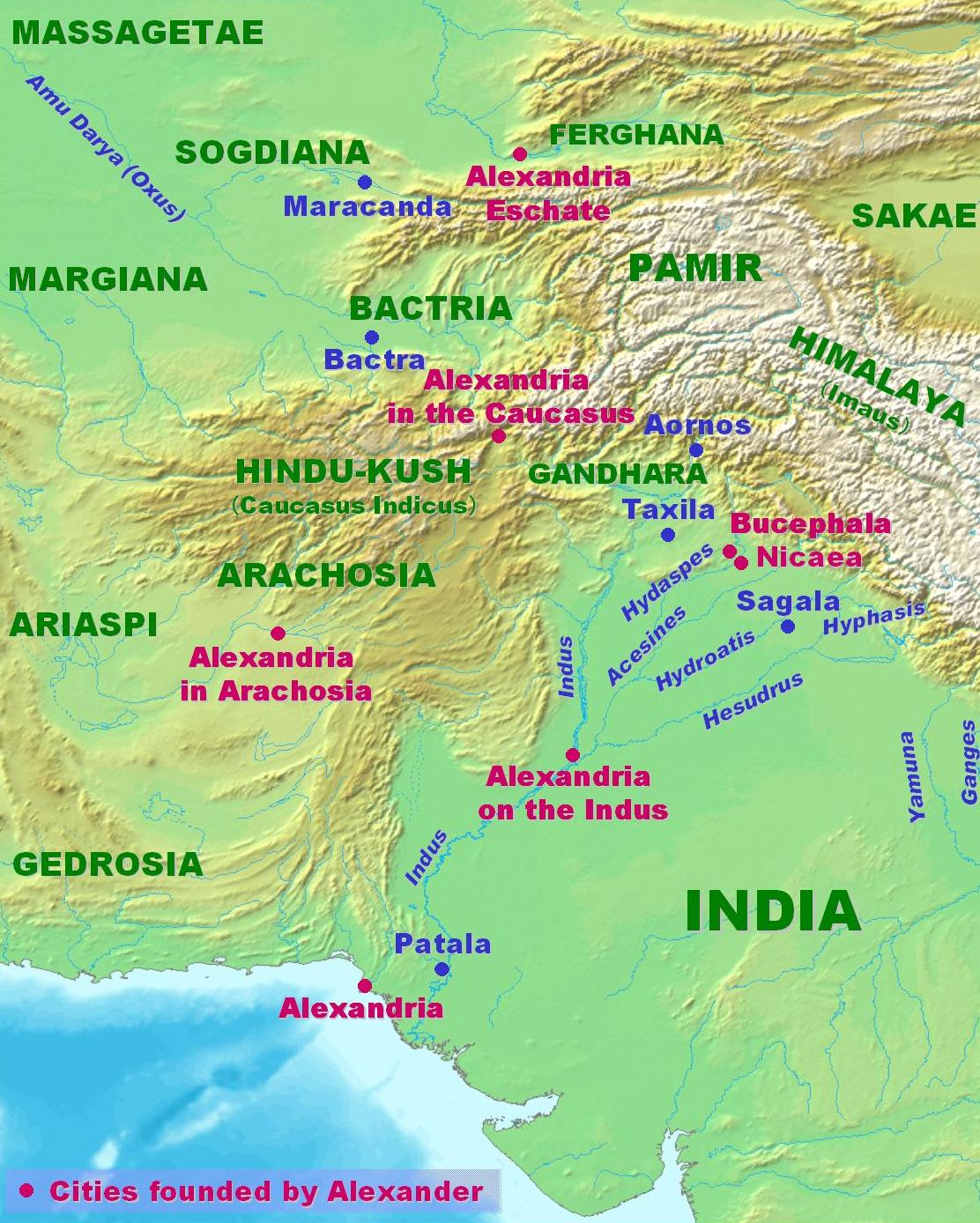
Sagala was included in Alexander's campaign in ancient India.

The Anabasis of Alexander, written by the Roman-Greek historian Arrian, recorded that Alexander the Great captured Sagala from the Cathaeans, who had entrenched themselves there. The city had been home to 80,000 residents on the eve of Alexander's invasion, but was razed as a warning against any other nearby cities that might resist his invasion:

"The Cathaeans... had a strong city near which they proposed to make their stand, named Sagala. (...) The next day Alexander rested his troops, and on the third advanced on Sangala, where the Cathaeans and their neighbours who had joined them were drawn up in front of the city. (...) At this point too, Porus arrived, bringing with him the rest of the elephants and some five thousand of his troops. (...) Alexander returned to Sangala, razed the city to the ground, and annexed its territory".

— Arrian, Anabasis of Alexander, V. 22–24

=== Shunga empire ===
Following his overthrowing of the Mauryan Empire, Pushyamitra Shunga established the Shunga Empire and expanded northwest as far as Sagala. According to the 2nd century Ashokavadana, the king persecuted Buddhists:

"Then King Pushyamitra equipped a fourfold army, and intending to destroy the Buddhist religion, he went to the Kukkutarama. (...) Pushyamitra therefore destroyed the sangharama, killed the monks there, and departed. After some time, he arrived in Sakala, and proclaimed that he would give a hundred dinara reward to whoever brought him the head of a Buddhist monk (Shramanas)."

— trans. John Strong, Ashokavadana, 133

=== Indo-Greek era ===
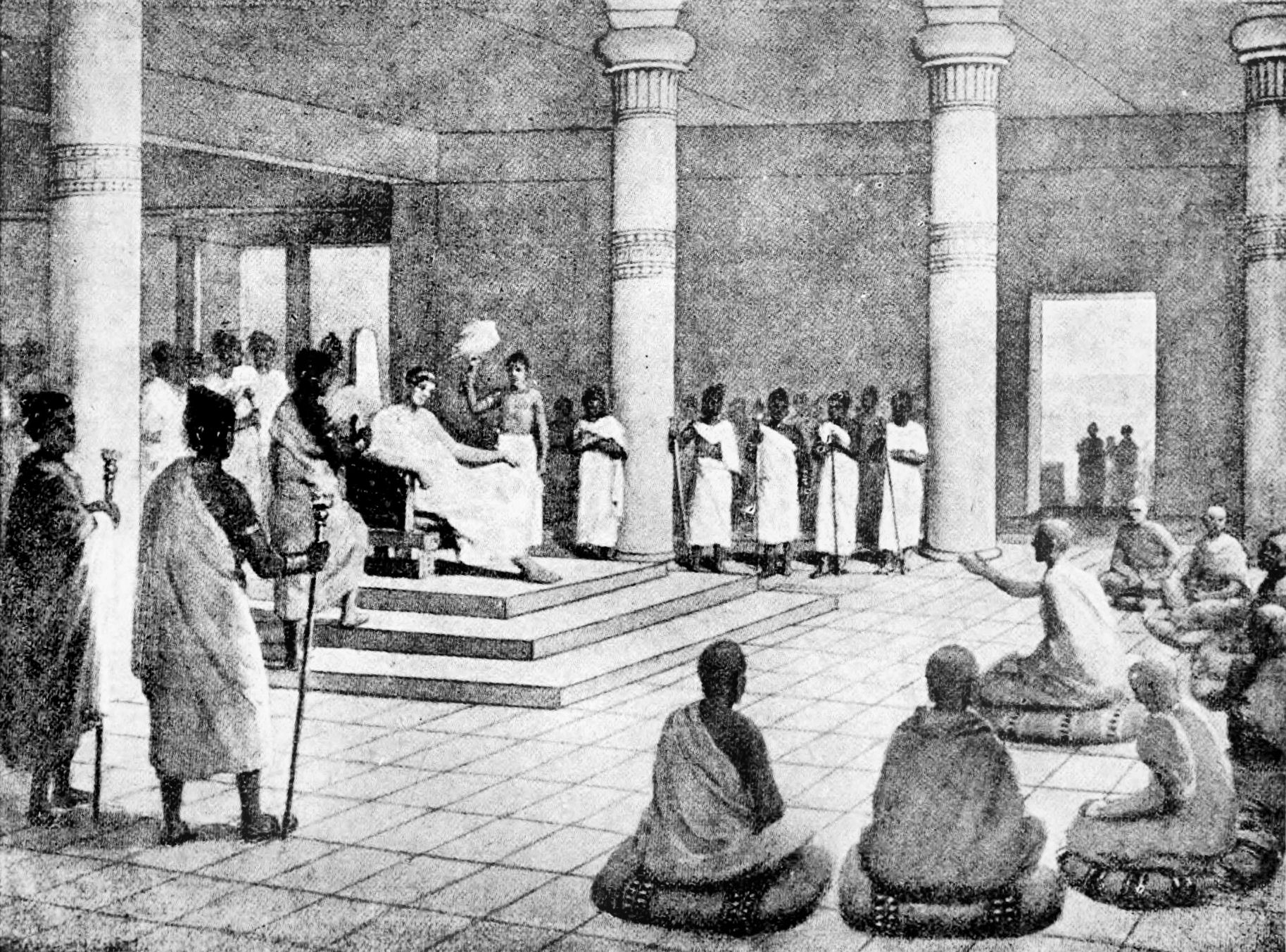
King Milinda and Nagasena.

Sagala, renamed Euthydemia by the Greeks, was used as a capital by the Indo-Greek king Menander during his reign between 160 and 135 BC.

Under Menander's rule, the city greatly prospered as a major trading centre renowned for its silk. Literary accounts suggests the Greeks and the local population of cities like Sagala lived in relative harmony, with some of the Greeks converting to Buddhism and adopting local traditions. Menander embraced Buddhism in Sagala, after an extensive debating with the Buddhist monk Nagasena, as recorded in the Buddhist text Milinda Panha. the text offers an early description of the city's cityscape and status as a prosperous trade centre with numerous green spaces. Following his conversion, Sialkot developed as a major centre for Buddhist thought. A hoard containing numerous coins of Menander I, and Hellenistic pottery shards, were unearthed from Siranwali village near Sialkot.

There is in the country of the Yonakas a great centre of trade, a city that is called Sâgala, situated in a delightful country well watered and hilly, abounding in parks and gardens and groves and lakes and tanks, a paradise of rivers and mountains and woods. Wise architects have laid it out, and its people know of no oppression, since all their enemies and adversaries have been put down. Brave is its defence, with many and various strong towers and ramparts, with superb gates and entrance archways; and with the royal citadel in its midst, white walled and deeply moated. Well laid out are its streets, squares, cross roads, and market places. Well displayed are the innumerable sorts of costly merchandise with which its shops are filled. It is richly adorned with hundreds of alms-halls of various kinds; and splendid with hundreds of thousands of magnificent mansions, which rise aloft like the mountain peaks of the Himalayas. Its streets are filled with elephants, horses, carriages, and foot-passengers, frequented by groups of handsome men and beautiful women, and crowded by men of all sorts and conditions, Brahmans, nobles, artificers, and servants. They resound with cries of welcome to the teachers of every creed, and the city is the resort of the leading men of each of the differing sects. Shops are there for the sale of Benares muslin, of Kotumbara stuffs, and of other cloths of various kinds; and sweet odours are exhaled from the bazaars, where all sorts of flowers and perfumes are tastefully set out. Jewels are there in plenty, such as men's hearts desire, and guilds of traders in all sorts of finery display their goods in the bazaars that face all quarters of the sky. So full is the city of money, and of gold and silver ware, of copper and stone ware, that it is a very mine of dazzling treasures. And there is laid up there much store of property and corn and things of value in warehouses-foods and drinks of every sort, syrups and sweetmeats of every kind. In wealth it rivals Uttara-kuru, and in glory it is as Âlakamandâ, the city of the gods.

— translated by T. W. Rhys Davids, 1890, The Questions of King Milinda

=== Later mentions ===
Sagala was recorded by Ptolemy in his 1st century CE work, Geography, in which he refers to the city as Euthymedia (Εύθυμέδεια). The city of Sagala was visited by the Chinese pilgrim Xuanzang in the 7th century, who mentioned that it was the old capital of the Alchon Hun king Mihirakula, and was then located in the kingdom of Takka.

== See also ==
- History of Sialkot
- List of ancient Indian cities
- Shambhala
- Shangri-La
