= Mianwali (disambiguation) =

Mianwali is a city in Punjab, Pakistan.

Mianwali may also refer to:

- Mianwali District, a district of Punjab (Pakistan)
- Mianwali Tehsil, a tehsil of district Mianwali
- Mianwali Airport, an airport in Pakistan
- Mianwali railway station, a railway station in Pakistan

== See also ==
- Mianwali Bangla, a village in Sialkot, Pakistan
- Mian Wali Qureshian, a village in Punjab, Pakistan
