= Sialkot =

Sialkot سیالکوٹ
- City
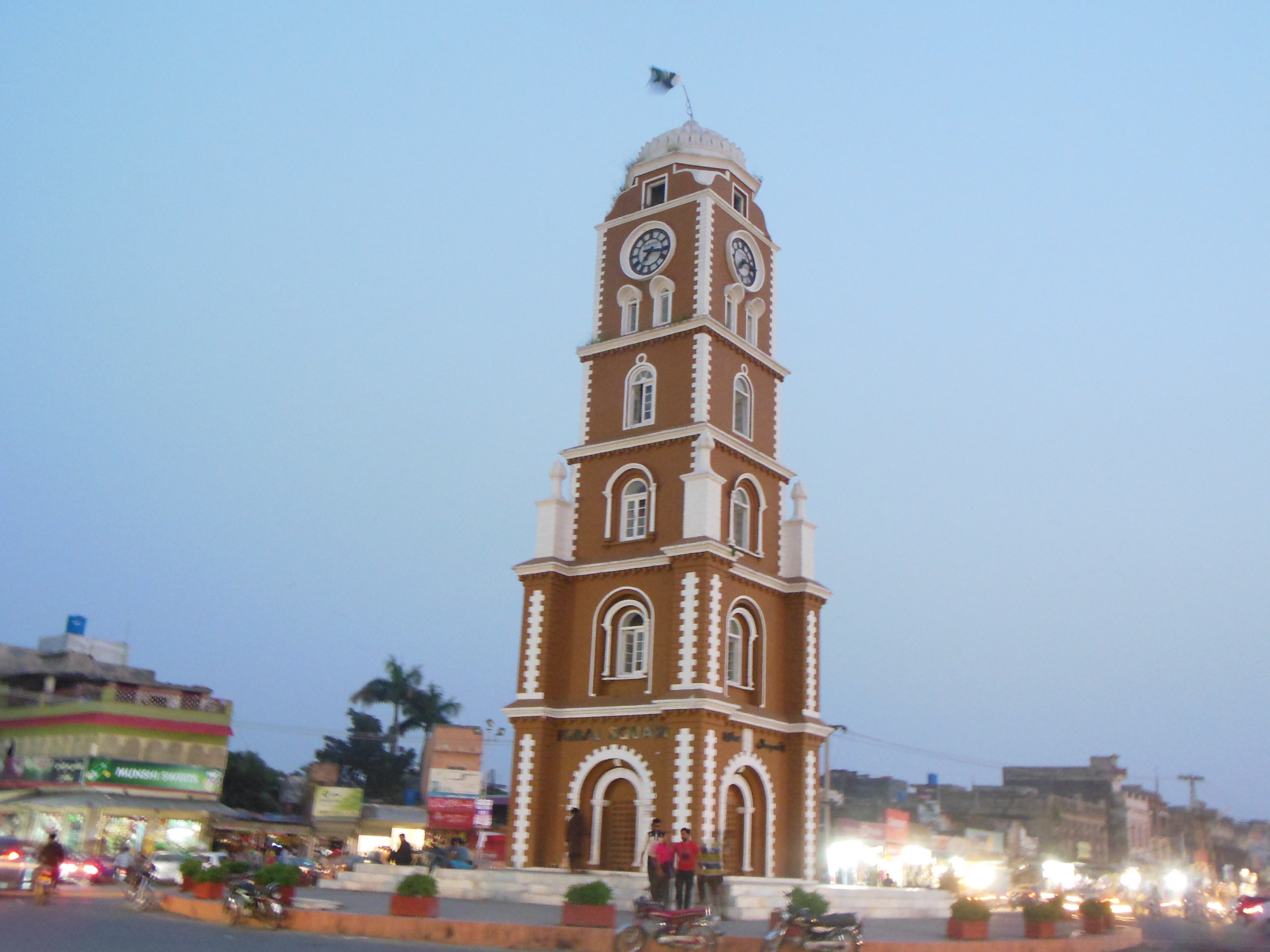
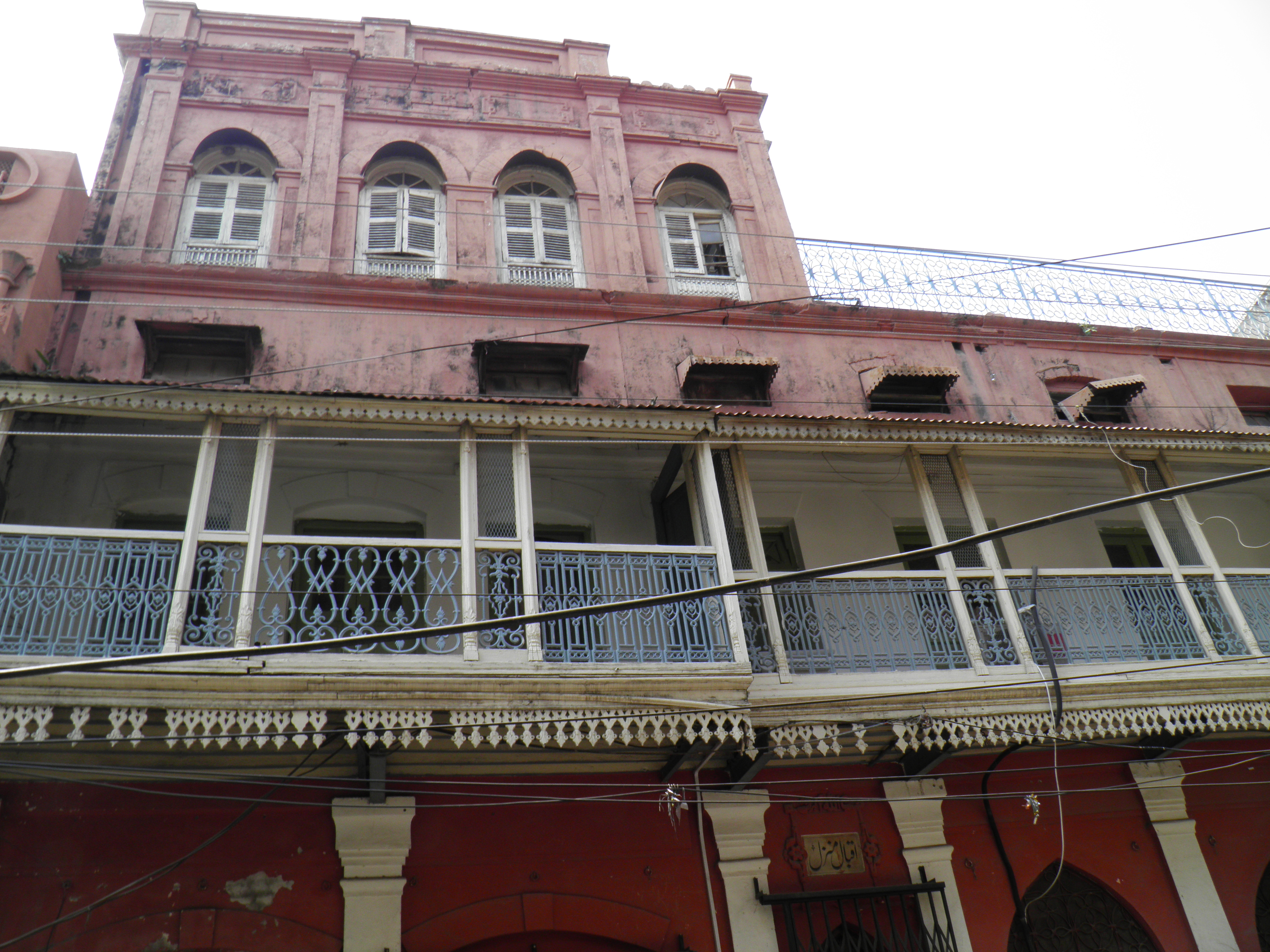
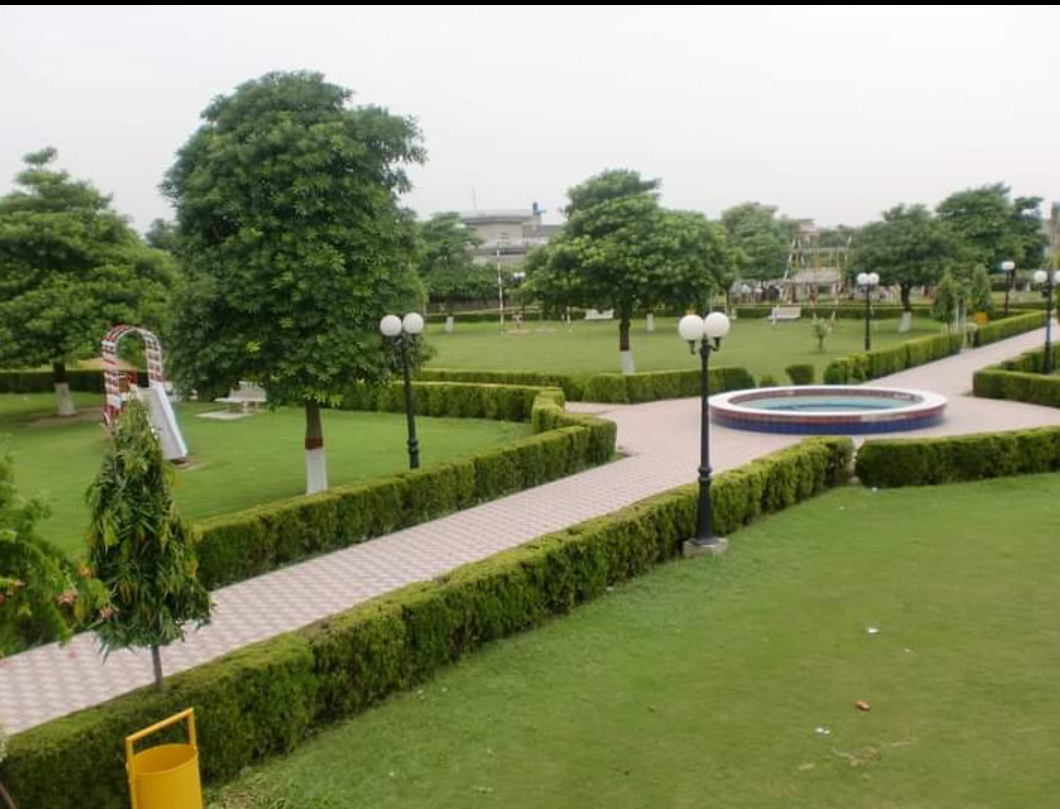
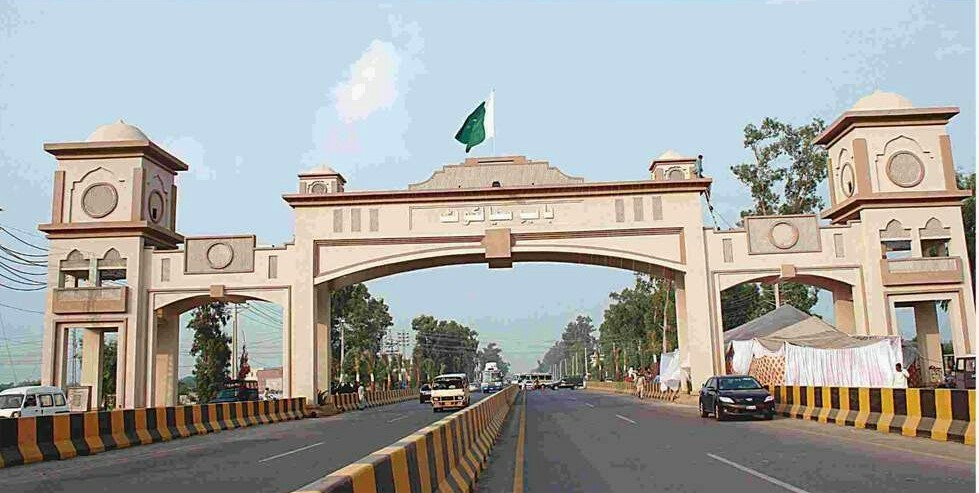
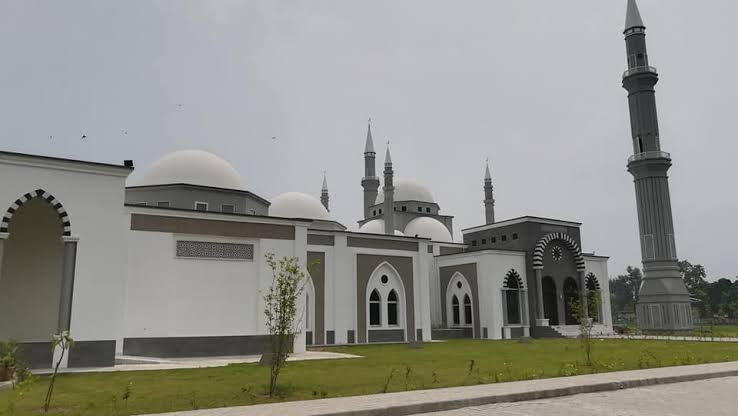
- Clock Tower, Sialkot Iqbal Manzil Fatima Jinnah Park Sialkot Gate Garrison Masjid Sialkot

- Municipal Corporation logo
- Nicknames: City of Iqbal
- Location within Punjab, Pakistan Location within Pakistan
- Coordinates: 32°29′33″N 74°31′52″E
- Country: Pakistan
- Province: (Punjab, Pakistan) Punjab
- Division: Gujranwala
- District: Sialkot

Government
  - Type: Municipal Corporation
  - Mayor: None
  - Deputy Mayor: None
  - Deputy Commissioner: Muhammad Iqbal

Area
  - City: 135 km^{2} (52 sq mi)

Population (2023)
  - City: 911,817
  - Rank: 12th, Pakistan
  - Density: 6,750/km^{2} (17,500/sq mi)
- Demonym: Sialkoti
- Time zone: UTC+5 (PST)
- Postal code: 51310
- Calling code: 052
- Old name: Sagala or Sakala
- Website: sialkot.punjab.gov.pk

Sialkot (Punjabi, Urdu: سيالكوٹ) is a city located in Punjab, Pakistan. It is the capital of the Sialkot District and the 12th most populous city in Pakistan as well as the 7th largest city in Punjab. The boundaries of Sialkot are joined by Jammu in the north east, the districts of Narowal in the southeast, Gujranwala in the southwest and Gujrat in the northwest.

Sialkot is believed to be the successor city of Sagala, the capital of the Madra kingdom which was destroyed by Alexander the Great in 326 BCE. It was made capital of the Indo-Greek kingdom by Menander I in the 2nd century BCE — a time during which the city greatly prospered as a major center for trade and Buddhist thought. In the 6th century CE, it again become capital of the Taank Kingdom, which ruled Punjab for the next two centuries. Sialkot continued to be a major political center until it was eclipsed by Lahore around the turn of the first millennium CE. Sialkot was the capital of the Punjabi Muslim ruler Jasrat Khokhar who reigned over most of Punjab and Jammu in the early 15th century. Under the Mughal Empire, especially Mughal emperor, Aurangzeb's reign, Sialkot became known as a great centre of Islamic scholarship and thought, and attracted scholars because of the widespread availability of paper in the city.

Sialkot city was the birthplace of the Islamic poet and philosopher Muhammad Iqbal, a leading figure of the Pakistan Movement. The city has been noted for its entrepreneurial spirit and productive business climate which have made Sialkot an example of a small Pakistani city that has emerged as a "world-class manufacturing hub." The relatively small city exported approximately $2.5 billion worth of goods in 2017, or about 10% of Pakistan's total exports. The city has been labeled as the Football manufacturing capital of the World, as it produces over 70% of all footballs manufactured in the world. Sialkot International Airport; Pakistan's first privately owned public airport is located 14km west of Sialkot.

== History ==
=== Ancient ===
==== Founding ====
Sialkot was the likely capital of the Madra kingdom Sagala, Sakala (Sanskrit: साकला), or Sangala (Ancient Greek: Σάγγαλα) mentioned in the Mahabharata, a Sanskrit epic of ancient India, as occupying a similar area as Greek accounts of Sagala. The city may have been inhabited by the Saka, or Scythians, from Central Asia who had migrated into the Subcontinent. The region was noted in the Mahabharata for the "loose and Bacchanalian" women who lived in the woods there. The city was said to have been located in the Sakaladvipa region between the Chenab and Ravi rivers, now known as the Rechna Doab.

==== Greek ====
The Anabasis of Alexander, written by the Roman-Greek historian Arrian, recorded that Alexander the Great captured ancient Sialkot, recorded as Sagala, from the Cathaeans, who had entrenched themselves there. The city had been home to 80,000 residents on the eve of Alexander's invasion, but was razed as a warning against any other nearby cities that might resist his invasion.

==== Indo-Greek ====
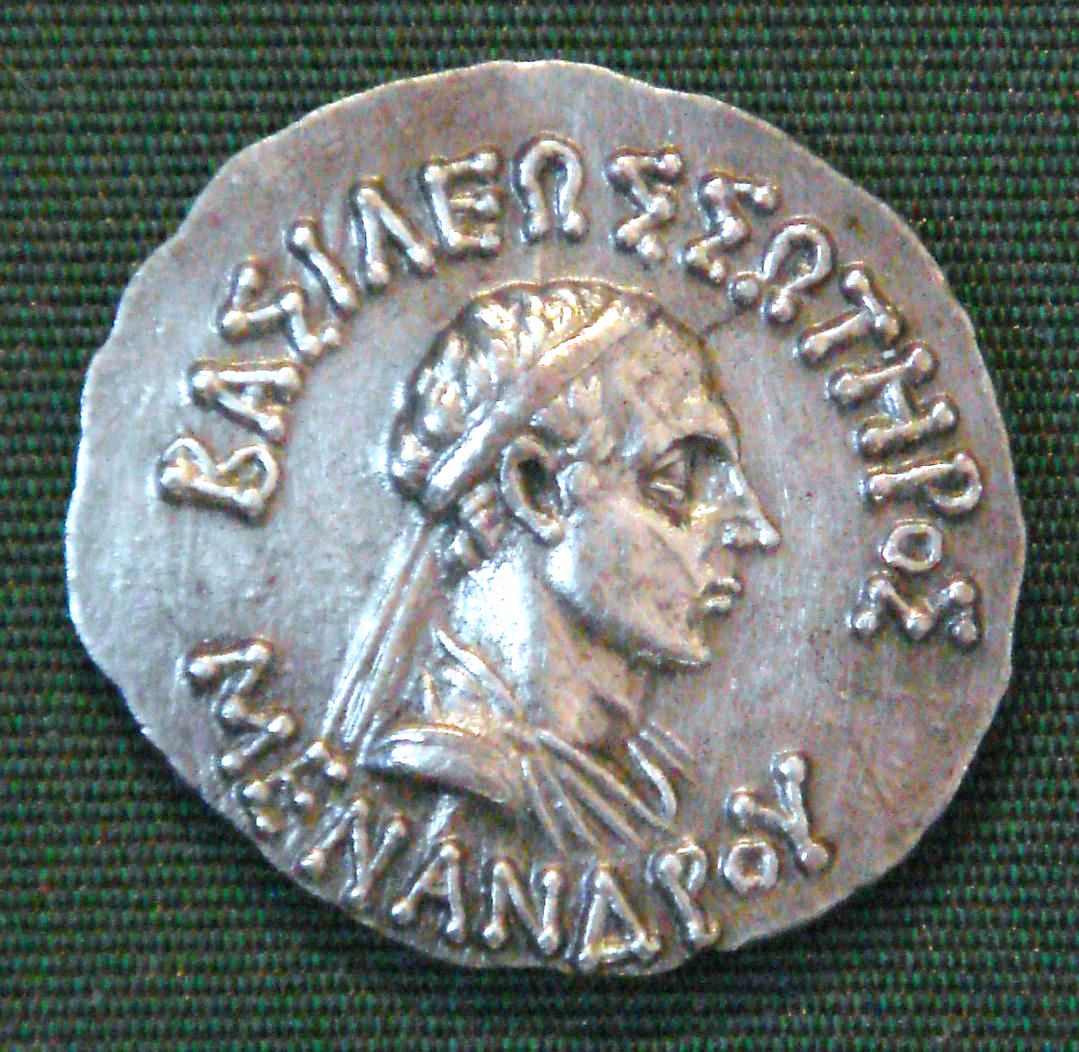
Menander I, founder of the Indo-Greek kingdom, with his capital in Sagala.

The ancient city was rebuilt, and made capital by the Indo-Greek king Menander I of the Euthydemid dynasty, in the 2nd century BCE. The rebuilt city was shifted slightly from the older city, as rebuilding on exactly the same spot was considered inauspicious.

Under Menander's rule, the city greatly prospered as a major trading centre renowned for its silk. Menander embraced Buddhism in Sagala, after an extensive debating with the Buddhist monk Nagasena, as recorded in the Buddhist text Milinda Panha. the text offers an early description of the city's cityscape and status as a prosperous trade centre with numerous green spaces. Following his conversion, Sialkot developed as a major centre for Buddhist thought.

Ancient Sialkot was recorded by Ptolemy in his 1st century CE work, Geography, in which he refers to the city as Euthymedia (Εύθυμέδεια).

==== Alchon Huns ====
Around 460 CE, the Alchon Huns invaded the region from Central Asia, forcing the ruling family of nearby Taxila to seek refuge in Sialkot. Sialkot itself was soon captured, and the city was made a significant centre of the Alchon Huns around 515, during the reign of Toramana. During the reign of his son, Mihirakula, the empire reached its zenith. The Alchon Huns were defeated in 528 by a coalition of princes led by Prince Yashodharman

==== Late antiquity ====
The city was visited by the Chinese traveller Xuanzang in 633, who recorded the city's name the She-kie-lo. Xuanzang reported that the city had been rebuilt approximately 15 li, or 2.5 miles, away from the city ruined by Alexander the Great. During this time, Sialkot served as the political nucleus of the North Punjab region. The city was then invaded in 643 by princes from Jammu, who held the city until the Muslim invasions during the medieval era.

=== Medieval ===
Around the year 1000, Sialkot began to decline in importance as the nearby city of Lahore rose to prominence. Following the fall of Lahore to the Ghaznavid Empire in the early 11th century, the capital of the Hindu Shahi empire was shifted from Lahore to Sialkot. Ghaznavid expansion in northern Punjab encouraged local Khokhar tribes to stop paying tribute to the Rajas of Jammu.

Sialkot became a part of the medieval Sultanate of Delhi after Muhammad of Ghor conquered Punjab in 1185. Ghauri was unable to conquer the larger city of Lahore, but deemed Sialkot important enough to warrant a garrison. He also extensively repaired the Sialkot Fort around the time of his conquest of Punjab, and left the region in charge of Hussain Churmali while he returned to Ghazni. Sialkot was then quickly laid siege to by Khokhar tribesmen, and Khusrau Malik, the last Ghaznavid sultan, though he was defeated during Ghauri's return to Punjab in 1186.

In the 1200s, Sialkot was the only area of western Punjab that was ruled by the Mamluk Sultanate in Delhi. The area had been captured by the Ghauri prince Taj al-Din Yildiz, but was recaptured by Sultan Iltutmish in 1217. Around 1223, Jalal al-Din Mangburni, the last king of the Anushtegin dynasty of Central Asia that had fled invasion of Genghis Khan there, briefly captured Sialkot and Lahore, before being driven out by Iltutmish's forces towards Uch Sharif. During the 13th century, Imam Ali-ul-Haq, Sialkot's most revered Sufi warrior-saint, arrived from Arabia, and began his missionary work in the region that successfully converted large numbers of Hindus to Islam, thereby transforming Sialkot into a largely Muslim city. The saint later died in battle, and is revered as a martyr.

Sialkot became capital of Punjabi warlord and ruler Jasrat Khokhar's kingdom in the early 15th century. Jasrat Khokhar conquered most of Punjab from the Delhi sultanate in a series of campaigns between 1421 and 1442. He also conquered Jammu after defeating its ruler Bhim Dev in 1423. This was the golden period of Sialkot. Later, Sultan Bahlul Khan Lodi captured the city after Jasrat Khokhar's death and granted custodianship of the city to Jammu's Raja Biram Dev, after he helped Bahlol in defeating the Khokhars. Sialkot was sacked by Malik Tazi Bhat of Kashmir, who attacked Sialkot after the governor of Punjab, Tatar Khan, had left the city undefended during one of his military campaigns.

Sialkot was captured by the armies of Babur in 1520, when the Mughal commander Usman Ghani Raza advanced towards Delhi during the initial conquest of Babur. Babur recorded a battle with Gujjar raiders, who had attacked Sialkot, and allegedly mistreated its inhabitants. In 1525–1526, Alam Khan, uncle of Sultan Ibrahim Lodi, invaded from Afghanistan and was able to capture Sialkot with the aid of Mongol forces.

=== Pre-modern ===
==== Mughal ====
Abdul Hakim Sialkoti was a 16th-17th century Mughal-era Islamic scholar, Islamic theologian, and Islamic philosopher from Sialkot. He became the most influential Islamic scholar in the Mughal imperial court, and taught in the imperial madrassa. After Abdul Hakim Sialkoti's death in 1656, his son Maulvī Abdullah became chief scholar of Sialkot, and his madrassa became a centre of learning.

During the early Mughal era, Sialkot was made part of the subah, or "province", of Lahore. According to Sikh tradition, Guru Nanak, the founder of Sikhism, visited the city sometime in the early 16th century. He is said to have met Hamza Ghaus, a prominent Sufi mystic based in Sialkot, at a site now commemorated by the city's Gurdwara Beri Sahib.

During the Akbar era, Sialkot's pargana territory was placed in the jagir custodianship of Raja Man Singh, who would repair the city's fort, and sought to increase its population and develop its economy. In 1580, Yousuf Shah Chak of Kashmir sought refuge in the city during his exile from the Valley of Kashmir. Paper-makers from Kashmir migrated to the city during the Akbar period, and Sialkot later became renowned as the source of the prized Mughal Hariri paper – known for its brilliant whiteness and strength. The city's metalworkers also provided the Mughal crown with much of its weaponry.

During the reign of Jahangir, the post was given to Safdar Khan, who rebuilt the city's fort, and oversaw a further increase in Sialkot's prosperity. Numerous fine houses and gardens were built in the city during the Jehangir period. During the Shah Jahan period, the city was placed under the rule of Ali Mardan Khan.

The last Mughal emperor, Aurangzeb, appointed Ganga Dhar as faujdar of the city until 1654. Rahmat Khan was then placed in charge of the city, and would build a mosque in the city. Under Aurangzeb's reign, Sialkot became known as a great centre of Islamic thought and scholarship, and attracted scholars because of the widespread availability of paper in the city.

==== Post-Mughal ====
Following the decline of the Mughal empire after the death of Emperor Aurangzeb in 1707, Sialkot and its outlying districts were left undefended and forced to defend itself. In 1739, the city was captured by Nader Shah of Persia during his invasion of the Mughal Empire. The city was placed under the governorship of Zakariya Khan, the Mughal Viceroy of Lahore, who in return for the city promised to pay tribute to the Persian crown. After that Nader Shah went to India where in Karnal, Rao Bal Kishan fought against him with their 5000 soldiers who hailed from Ahirwal on 24, February 1739. Witnessing this, Nader Shah was shocked but impressed by Rao Bal Kishan's fighting skills. Later when Nadir Shah reached Delhi he told Muhammad Shah about Rao Bal Kishan's bravery, on which Muhammad Shah ordered to make a "Chhatri" to honour Rao Bal Kishan at Karnal which still can be found. In the wake of the Persian invasion, Sialkot fell under the control of Pashtun powerful families from Multan and Afghanistan – the Kakazai and Sherwanis. Sialkot was crept upon by Ranjit Deo of Jammu, who pledged nominal allegiance to the Mughal crown in Delhi. Ranjit Deo did not conquer Sialkot city from the Pashtun families which held the city, but switched allegiance to the Pashtun ruler Ahmed Shah Durrani in 1748, effectively ending Mughal influence in Sialkot. The city and three nearby districts were amalgamated into the Durrani Empire.

==== Sikh ====
Sikh chieftains of the Bhangi Misl state encroached upon Sialkot, and had gained full control of the Sialkot region by 1786, Sialkot was portioned into 4 quarters, under the control of Sardar Jiwan Singh, Natha Singh, Sahib Singh, and Mohar Singh, who invited the city's dispersed residents back to the city.

The Bhangi rulers engaged in feuds with the neighbouring Sukerchakia Misl state by 1791, and would eventually lose control of the city. The Sikh Empire of Ranjit Singh captured Sialkot from Sardar Jiwan Singh in 1808. Sikh forces then occupied Sialkot until the arrival of the British in 1849.

=== Modern ===
==== British ====
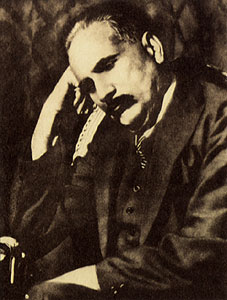
Muhammad Iqbal, the philosopher-poet credited inspiring the Pakistan Movement, was born in Sialkot in 1877.

Sialkot, along with Punjab as a whole, was captured by the British following their victory over the Sikhs at the Battle of Gujrat in February 1849. During the British period, an official known as The Resident who would, in theory, advise the Maharaja of Kashmir would reside in Sialkot during the wintertime.

During the Sepoy Mutiny of 1857, the two Bengal regiments based in Sialkot rebelled against the East India Company, while their native servants also took up arms against the British.

The British-Raj fought in The Second Boer War (1899-1902). A POW camp was located in Sialkot and it held many detained Boer Prisoners-of-War.

In 1877, the Sialkot native poet Allama Iqbal, who is credited for inspiring the Pakistan Movement, was born into a Kashmiri family that had converted to Islam from Hinduism in the early 1400s. He is considered to be one of the leading Islamic thought leaders and Islamic revivalists of the 20th century, and is also widely regarded as having animated the pulse for the Pakistan Movement.

In August 1947, nine years after Iqbal's death, the partition of India gave way to the establishment of Pakistan, a newly independent Islamic state in which Iqbal is honoured as the national poet. He is also known in Pakistani society as Hakim ul-Ummat (lit. 'The Wise Man of the Ummah') and as Mufakkir-e-Pakistan (lit. 'The Thinker of Pakistan'). The anniversary of his birth (Yom-e Weladat-e Muḥammad Iqbal), 9 November, is observed as a public holiday in Pakistan.

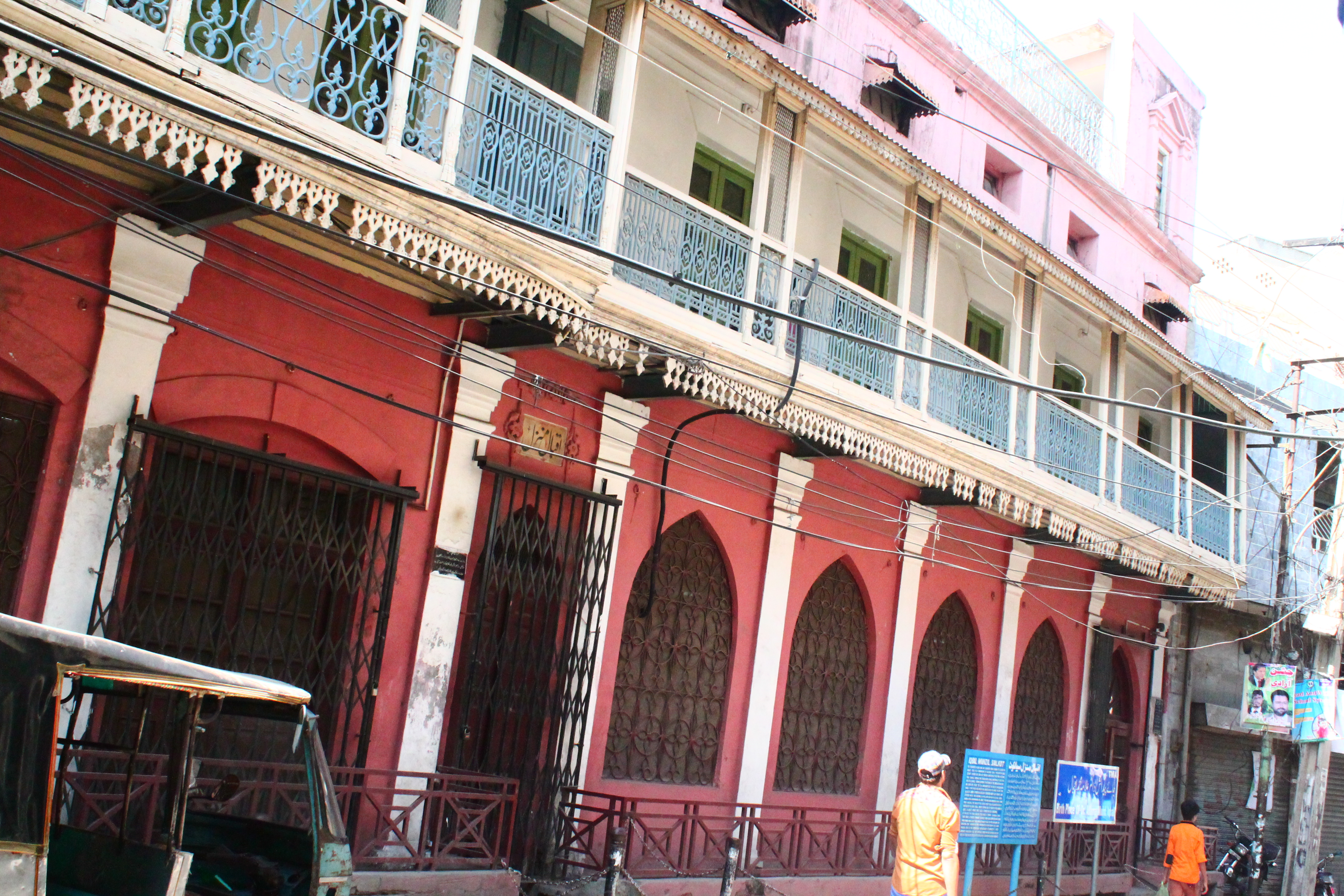
Iqbal Manzil, the residence of Allama Iqbal.

Sialkot's modern prosperity began during the colonial era. The city had been known for its paper making and ironworks prior to the colonial era, and became a centre of metalwork in the 1890s. Surgical instruments were being manufactured in Sialkot for use throughout British India by the 1920s. The city also became a centre for sports goods manufacturing for British troops stationed along with the North West Frontier due to the availability of nearby timber reserves.

As a result of the city's prosperity, large numbers of migrants from Jammu region of Jammu and Kashmir came to the city in search of employment. At the end of World War II, the city was considered the second most industrialised in British Punjab, after Amritsar. Much of the city's infrastructure was paid for by local taxes, and the city was one of the few in British India to have its own electric utility company.

==== Partition ====
The religiopolitical slogan Pakistan ka matlab kya, La ilaha il-Allah (Urdu: پاکستان کا مطلب کیا لاالہ الا اللہ — ; lit. What does Pakistan mean?... There is no God but Allah) was a couplet and political slogan coined in 1943 by Sialkot-born and raised poet Asghar Saudai. The slogan became a battle cry and greeting for the Muslim League, which was struggling for an independent country for the Muslims of South Asia, when World War II ended and the independence movement geared up. This slogan shows the religious identity of Pakistan too.

The first communal riots between Hindus/Sikhs and Muslims took place on 24 June 1946, a day after the resolution calling for the establishment of Pakistan as a separate state. Sialkot remained peaceful for several months while communal riots had erupted in Lahore, Amritsar, Ludhiana, and Rawalpindi. The predominantly Muslim population supported the Muslim League and the Pakistan Movement.

While Muslim refugees had poured into the city, escaping riots elsewhere, Sialkot's Hindu and Sikh communities began fleeing in the opposite direction towards India. They initially congregated in fields outside the city, where some of Sialkot's Muslims would bid farewell to departing friends. Hindu and Sikh refugees were unable to exit Pakistan towards Jammu on account of the conflict in Kashmir, and were instead required to transit via Lahore.

==== Post-independence ====
After independence in 1947, the Hindu and Sikh minorities migrated to India, while Muslim refugees from India settled in Sialkot. The city had suffered significant losses as a result of communal rioting that erupted following the Partition. 80% of Sialkot's industry had been destroyed or abandoned, and the working capital fell by an estimated 90%. The city was further stressed by the arrival of 200,000 migrants, mostly from Jammu, who had arrived in the city.

Following the demise of industry in the city, the government of West Pakistan prioritised the re-establishment of Punjab's decimated industrial base. The province lead infrastructure projects in the area, and allotted abandoned properties to newly arrived refugees. Local entrepreneurs also rose to fill the vacuum created by the departure of Hindu and Sikh businessmen. By the 1960s, the provincial government has laid extensive new roadways in the district, connecting it to trunk roads that eventually linked the region to the seaport in Karachi.

During the Indo-Pakistani War of 1965, when Pakistani troops arrived in Kashmir, the Indian Army counterattacked in the Sialkot Sector. The Pakistan Army successfully defended the city, and the people of Sialkot came out in full force to support the troops. In 1966, the Government of Pakistan awarded a special flag of Hilal-e-Istaqlal to Sialkot, along with the cities of Lahore and Sargodha, for their brave resistance against the opposing armed forces. Historians estimate that the armored battles in the Sialkot sector, such as the Battle of Chawinda, were among the largest tank battles in the entire history, outmatched only by a few World War II tank battles, including the Battle of Kursk.

== Geography ==
=== Climate ===
Sialkot

Climate chart (precipitation, max. and min. temperature)
J	F	M	A	M	J	J	A	S	O	N	D
41 17 5	50 21 8	52 26 13	37 33 18	19 38 23	68 39 25	293 35 26	300 34 25	103 33 24	23 31 18	9.6 26 11	14 20 6
- █ Average max. and min. temperatures in °C
- █ Precipitation totals in mm
Imperial conversion
J	F	M	A	M	J	J	A	S	O	N	D
1.6 63 42	2 70 47	2.1 79 55	1.5 91 65	0.7 101 73	2.7 102 78	12 94 78	12 92 78	4 92 74	0.9 88 64	0.4 79 52	0.5 68 43
- █ Average max. and min. temperatures in °F
- █ Precipitation totals in inches

Sialkot features a humid subtropical climate (Cwa) under the Köppen climate classification, characterized by four different seasons. The post-monsoon season from mid-September to mid-November remains relatively hot during the daytime, but nights are considerably cooler, with low humidity. In the winter, from mid-November to March, daytime temperatures vary from mild to warm, accompanied by occasional heavy rainfalls. Furthermore, temperatures in winter may drop to 0 °C or 32 °F, but maxima are very rarely less than 15 °C or 59 °F.

Climate data for Sialkot (1991-2020)
Month	Jan	Feb	Mar	Apr	May	Jun	Jul	Aug	Sep	Oct	Nov	Dec	Year
Record high °C (°F)	26.1 (79.0)	30.0 (86.0)	36.5 (97.7)	43.3 (109.9)	47.3 (117.1)	48.9 (120.0)	44.4 (111.9)	41.1 (106.0)	39.0 (102.2)	37.2 (99.0)	33.3 (91.9)	27.2 (81.0)	48.9 (120.0)
Mean daily maximum °C (°F)	17.4 (63.3)	21.2 (70.2)	26.2 (79.2)	32.9 (91.2)	38.2 (100.8)	38.8 (101.8)	34.7 (94.5)	33.4 (92.1)	33.1 (91.6)	31.1 (88.0)	25.9 (78.6)	20.2 (68.4)	29.4 (85.0)
Daily mean °C (°F)	11.4 (52.5)	14.8 (58.6)	19.4 (66.9)	25.5 (77.9)	30.5 (86.9)	32.1 (89.8)	30.2 (86.4)	29.4 (84.9)	28.3 (82.9)	24.3 (75.7)	18.4 (65.1)	13.2 (55.8)	23.1 (73.6)
Mean daily minimum °C (°F)	5.4 (41.7)	8.3 (46.9)	13.0 (55.4)	18.1 (64.6)	22.8 (73.0)	25.4 (77.7)	25.6 (78.1)	25.4 (77.7)	23.6 (74.5)	17.5 (63.5)	10.9 (51.6)	6.0 (42.8)	16.8 (62.3)
Record low °C (°F)	−3 (27)	−1.0 (30.2)	3.0 (37.4)	9.0 (48.2)	13.4 (56.1)	17.6 (63.7)	19.4 (66.9)	18.7 (65.7)	13.3 (55.9)	8.5 (47.3)	3.0 (37.4)	−0.6 (30.9)	−3.0 (26.6)
Average precipitation mm (inches)	41.3 (1.63)	50.4 (1.98)	52.4 (2.06)	36.9 (1.45)	18.9 (0.74)	67.8 (2.67)	293.2 (11.54)	299.5 (11.79)	102.7 (4.04)	22.4 (0.88)	9.6 (0.38)	13.6 (0.54)	1,008.7 (39.7)
Average precipitation days (≥ 1.0 mm)	3.6	4.6	5.1	4.3	3.6	6.5	13.3	12.4	6.4	2.0	1.2	1.7	64.7
Source 1: NOAA (extremes 1971–1990),
Source 2: Meteomanz (extremes since 2000)

=== Cityscape ===
Sialkot's core is composed of the densely populated old city, while north of the city lies the vast colonial era Sialkot Cantonment – characterised by wide streets and large lawns. The city's industries have evolved in a "ribbon-like" pattern along the cities main arteries, and are almost entirely dedicated to export. The city's sporting good firms are not concentrated in any part of the city, but are instead spread throughout Sialkot. Despite the city's overall prosperity, the local government has failed to meet Sialkot's basic infrastructure needs.

== Demographics ==
Population

Historical population

Year	Pop.	±% p.a.
1951	156,378	—
1961	167,294	+0.68%
1972	203,650	+1.80%
1981	302,009	+4.48%

Year	Pop.	±% p.a.
1998	421,502	+1.98%
2017	655,852	+2.35%
2023	911,817	+5.65%

=== Religion ===
Religion in Sialkot
Religion	Percent
Islam	96%
Christianity	3.77%
Others	0.23%

Sialkot is a religiously homogenous city with 96 percent of its population being Muslim and following Islam. The principal minority is Christians who make up 3.77 percent of the population. During the 13th century, Imam Ali-ul-Haq, Sialkot's most revered Sufi warrior-saint, arrived from Arabia, and began his Dawah in the region that successfully converted large numbers of the native population to Islam, thereby transforming Sialkot into a largely Muslim city. The saint later died in battle, and is revered as a Shahid by the locals.

Religious groups in Sialkot City (1868−2023) (Note: 1881-1941: Data for the entirety of the town of Sialkot, which included Sialkot Municipality and Sialkot Cantonment.. 2017-2023: Urban population of Sialkot Tehsil.)
Religious group	1868		1881		1891		1901		1911		1921		1931		1941		2017		2023	
Religious group	Pop.	%	Pop.	%	Pop.	%	Pop.	%	Pop.	%	Pop.	%	Pop.	%	Pop.	%	Pop.	%	Pop.	%
Islam	16,580	65.44%	28,865	63.08%	31,920	57.94%	39,350	67.9%	40,613	62.61%	44,846	63.5%	69,700	69.03%	90,706	65.39%	653,346	95.96%	885,336	95.99%
Hinduism (Note: 1931-1941: Including Ad-Dharmis)	6,148	24.26%	12,751	27.86%	17,978	32.64%	13,433	23.18%	15,417	23.77%	15,808	22.38%	18,670	18.49%	29,661	21.38%	1,102	0.16%	1,347	0.15%
Sikhism	1,295	5.11%	1,942	4.24%	1,797	3.26%	2,236	3.86%	4,290	6.61%	3,433	4.86%	4,931	4.88%	8,431	6.08%	—N/a	—N/a	66	0.01%
Christianity	13	0.05%	—N/a	—N/a	2,283	4.14%	1,650	2.85%	3,222	4.97%	5,033	7.13%	6,095	6.04%	5,157	3.72%	25,433	3.74%	34,811	3.77%
Jainism	—N/a	—N/a	876	1.91%	1,105	2.01%	1,272	2.19%	1,310	2.02%	1,472	2.08%	1,570	1.55%	2,790	2.01%	—N/a	—N/a	—N/a	—N/a
Zoroastrianism	—N/a	—N/a	—N/a	—N/a	4	0.01%	9	0.02%	17	0.03%	27	0.04%	7	0.01%	—N/a	—N/a	—N/a	—N/a	0	0%
Buddhism	—N/a	—N/a	—N/a	—N/a	0	0%	6	0.01%	0	0%	0	0%	0	0%	—N/a	—N/a	—N/a	—N/a	—N/a	—N/a
Ahmadiyya	—N/a	—N/a	—N/a	—N/a	—N/a	—N/a	—N/a	—N/a	—N/a	—N/a	—N/a	—N/a	—N/a	—N/a	—N/a	—N/a	958	0.14%	339	0.04%
Others	1,301	5.13%	1,328	2.9%	0	0%	0	0%	0	0%	0	0%	0	0%	1,963	1.42%	25	0%	450	0.05%
Total population	25,337	100%	45,762	100%	55,087	100%	57,956	100%	64,869	100%	70,619	100%	100,973	100%	138,708	100%	680,864	100%	922,349	100%

=== Languages ===
Urban population of Sialkot Tehsil (2023)
1. Punjabi (85.7%)
2. Urdu (10.4%)
3. Pashto (2.85%)
4. Sindhi (0.36%)
5. Saraiki (0.31%)
6. Others (0.73%)

There are a multitude of languages spoken in Sialkot, in the 2023 census 85.71% of the population spoke Punjabi, 10.40% spoke Urdu, 2.85% spoke Pashto, 0.36% Sindhi and 0.31% spoke Saraiki while 0.73% spoke other smaller languages.

== Economy ==
Sialkot is a wealthy city relative to the rest of Pakistan, with a GDP (nominal) of $13 Billions and a per capita income in 2021 estimated at $18500. The city was considered to be one of British India's most industrialised cities, though its economy would later be largely decimated by violence and capital flight following the Partition. The city's economy rebounded, and Sialkot now forms part of the relatively industrialised region of northern Punjab that is sometimes referred to as the Golden Triangle.

Sialkot has been noted by Britain's The Economist magazine as a "world-class manufacturing hub" with strong export industries. As of 2017, Sialkot exported US$2.5 billion worth of goods which is equal to 10% of Pakistan's total exports (US$25 billion). 250,000 residents are employed in Sialkot's industries, with most enterprises in the city being small and funded by family savings. Sialkot's Chamber of Commerce had over 6,500 members in 2010, with most active in the leather, sporting goods, and surgical instruments industry. The Sialkot Dry Port offers local producers quick access to Pakistani Customs, as well as to logistics and transportation.

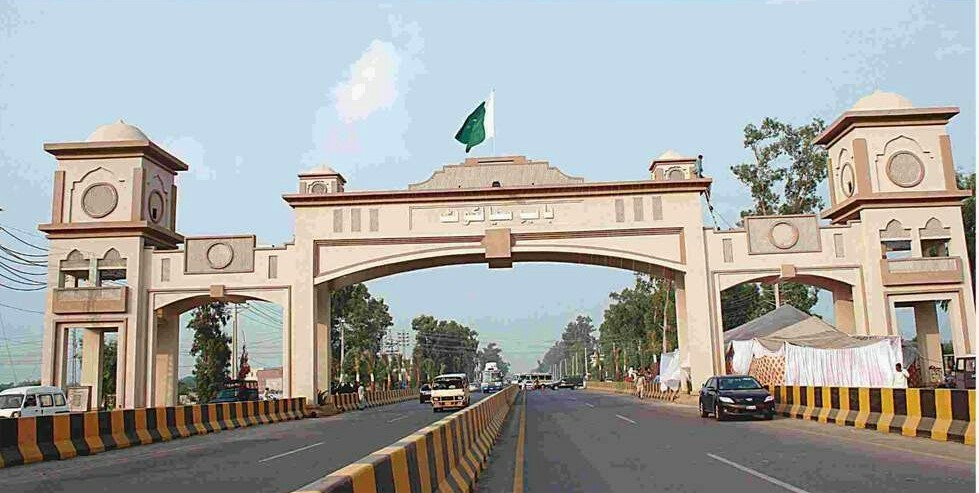
Sialkot Gate

Despite being cut off from its historic economic heartland in Kashmir, Sialkot has managed to position itself into one of Pakistan's most prosperous cities, exporting up to 10% of all Pakistani exports. Its sporting goods firms have been particularly successful, and have produced items for global brands such as Nike, Adidas, Reebok, and Puma. Balls for the 2014 FIFA World Cup, 2018 FIFA World Cup and 2022 FIFA World Cup were made by Forward Sports, a Sialkot-based company. The city has been labeled as the Football manufacturing capital of the World, as it produces over 70% of all footballs manufactured in the world.

Sialkot's business community has joined with the local government to maintain the city's infrastructure, as the local government has limited capacity to fund such maintenance. The business community was instrumental in the establishment of Sialkot's Dry Port in 1985, and further helped re-pave the city's roads. Sialkot's business community also largely funded the Sialkot International Airport—opened in 2011 as Pakistan's first privately owned public airport.

Sialkot is also the only city in Pakistan to have its very own commercial airline, Airsial. This airline is managed by the business community of Sialkot based at the Sialkot Chamber of Commerce and Industries and offers direct flights from Sialkot to Bahrain, Oman, Qatar, Saudi Arabia, and the United Arab Emirates.

=== Industry ===
Sialkot is the world's largest producer of hand-sewn footballs, with local factories manufacturing 40–60 million footballs a year, amounting to roughly 60% of world production. Since the 2014 FIFA World Cup, footballs for the official matches are being made by Forward Sports, a company based in Sialkot. Clustering of sports goods industrial units has allowed for firms in Sialkot to become highly specialised, and to benefit from joint action and external economies. There is a well-applied child labour ban, the Atlanta Agreement, in the industry since a 1997 outcry, and the local industry now funds the Independent Monitoring Association for Child Labour to regulate factories.

Sialkot is also the world's largest centre of surgical instrument manufacturing. Sialkot was first noted to be a centre of metalwork in the 1890s, and the city's association with surgical instruments came from the need to repair, and subsequently manufacture, surgical instruments for the nearby Mission hospital. By the 1920s, surgical instruments were being manufactured for use throughout British India, with demand boosted by further by World War II.

The city's surgical instrument manufacturing industry benefits from a clustering effect, in which larger manufacturers remain in close contact with smaller and specialised industries that can efficiently perform contracted work. The industry is made up of a few hundred small and medium size enterprises, supported by thousands of subcontractors, suppliers, and those providing other ancillary services. The bulk of exports are destined for the United States and European Union.

Sialkot first became a centre for sporting goods manufacturing during the colonial era. Enterprises were initially inaugurated for the recreation of British troops stationed along the North West Frontier. Nearby timber reserves served to initially allure the industry to Sialkot. The city's Muslim craftsmen generally manufactured the goods, while Sikh and Hindu merchants of the Sindhi Bania, Arora, and Punjabi Khatri castes acted like middle men to bring goods to market. Sialkot now produces a wide array of sporting goods, including footballs and hockey sticks, cricket gear, gloves that are used in international games comprising the Olympics and World Cups.

Sialkot is also noted for its leather goods. Leather for footballs is sourced from nearby farms, while Sialkot's leather workers craft some of Germany's most prized leather lederhosen trousers.

Sialkot also has a large share in the agricultural sector. It predominantly produces Basmati rice varieties, wheat and sugarcane. Its area is 3,015 km^{2} (1,164 sq mi), at least 642,624 acres (260,061 ha) are under cultivation. Potato and sunflower were evident among the minor crops of the district.

=== Public-Private Partnerships ===
Sialkot has a productive relationship between the civic administration and the city's entrepreneurs, that dates to the colonial era. Sialkot's infrastructure was paid for by local taxes on industry, and the city was one of the few in British Raj to have its own electric utility company.

Modern Sialkot's business community has assumed responsibility for developing infrastructure when the civic administration is unable to deliver requested services. The city's Chamber of Commerce established the Sialkot Dry Port, the country's first dry-port in 1985 to reduce transit times by offering faster customs services. Members of the Chamber of Commerce allowed paid fees to help resurface the city's streets. The Sialkot International Airport was established by the local businesses community, is the only private airport in Pakistan.

== Transportation ==
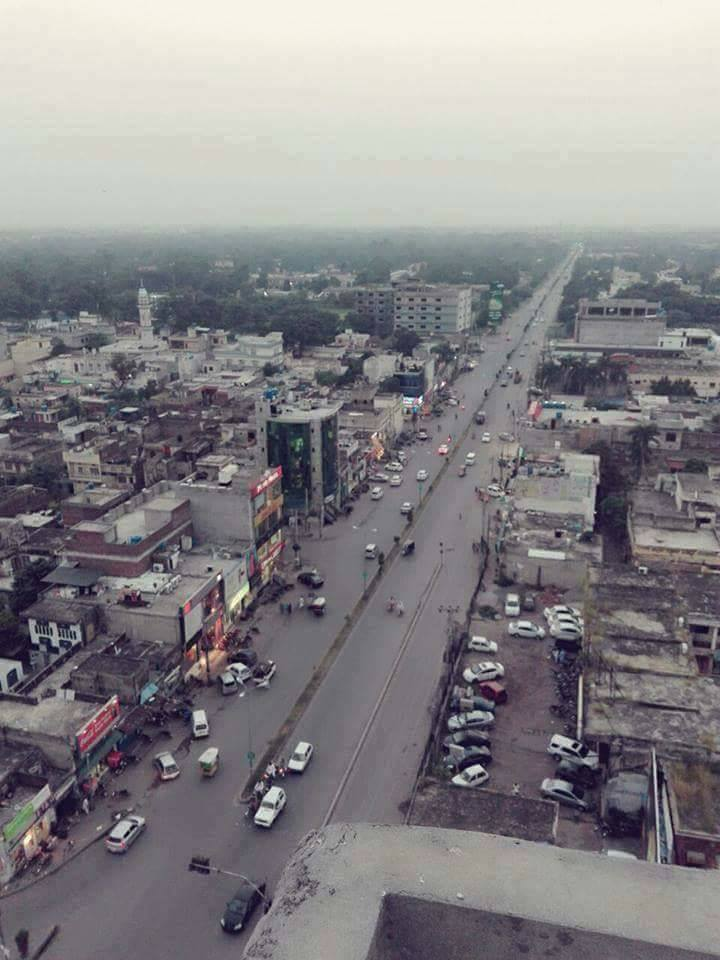
A boulevard in Sialkot

=== Highways ===
A dual-carriageway connects Sialkot to the nearby city of Wazirabad, with onward connections throughout Pakistan via the N-5 National Highway, while another dual carriageway connects Sialkot to Daska, and onwards to Gujranwala and Lahore. Sialkot and Lahore are also connected through the motorway M11.

=== Rail ===
The Sialkot Junction railway station is the city's main railway station and is serviced by the Wazirabad–Narowal Branch Line of the Pakistan Railways. The Allama Iqbal Express travels daily from Sialkot to Karachi via Lahore, and then back to Sialkot.

=== Air ===
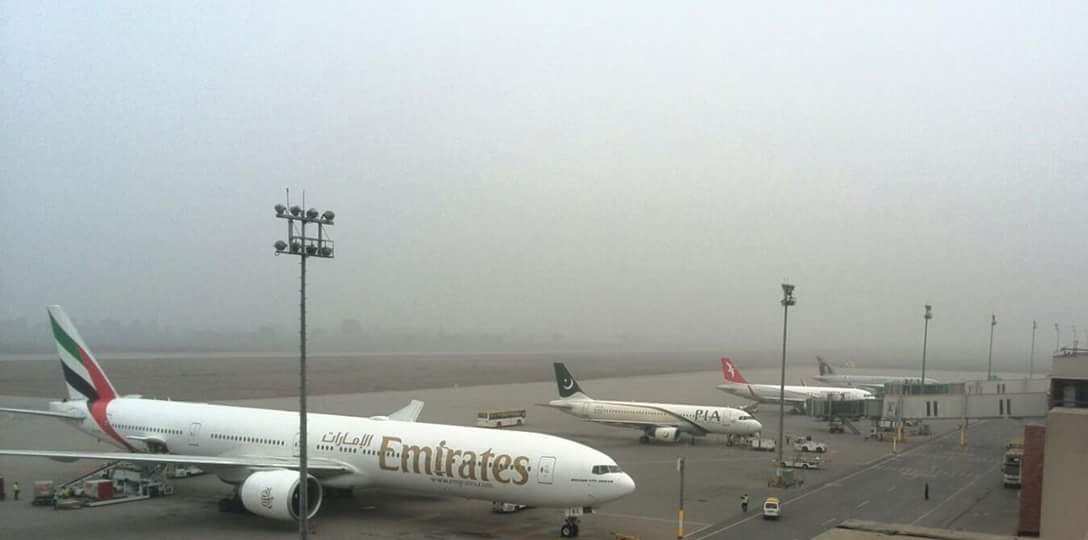
Sialkot International Airport

The Sialkot International Airport is located about 20 km from the center of the city near Sambrial. It was established in 2007 by spending 4 billion rupees by Sialkot business community. It is Pakistan's only privately owned public airport, and offers flights throughout Pakistan, with also direct flights to Bahrain, Oman, Saudi Arabia, Qatar, the United Arab Emirates, France, the UK and Spain.

== Twin towns – sister cities ==
Sialkot is twinned with:

- Bolingbrook, Illinois, United States

== See also ==
- Sialkot Chamber of Commerce and Industry
- List of educational institutions in Sialkot
- List of cities in Punjab, Pakistan by area
- Sialkot Stallions
- Shivala Teja Singh temple
