= Sialkot Chamber of Commerce and Industry =

Business chamber in Sialkot, Punjab, Pakistan

Sialkot Chamber of Commerce & Industry (SCCI) is located in Sialkot, Punjab, Pakistan. It is the only business chamber in Pakistan to operate its own private airport and domestic commercial airline, currently known as Air Sial. The chamber was able to gain an air licence after it made a successful application to the Pakistan Civil Aviation Authority.

== See also ==
- Sialkot
- Sialkot District
- Sialkot International Airport Limited
- Sialkot International Airport
- Sialkot Dry Port
