= Atlanta Agreement =

Agreement to combat use of child labor in the football-making industry

The Atlanta Agreement is an agreement which was formed between the International Labour Organization, the Sialkot Chamber of Commerce and Industry and UNICEF on February 14, 1997. It was announced at the Sports Super Show in Atlanta, United States. Its goal was to combat high rates of child labour in the Pakistani football making industry.

== Overview ==
=== Goals ===
The goal of the agreement was to improve the working conditions and pay of families living in Sialkot. This would be achieved by helping to ensure that children ("children" defined as persons under the age of 15) would not be forced to work, or at least not forced to miss school, in order to make footballs. At best, it was hoped that the agreement would ensure that adults would be able to earn enough money to support their families without their children having to work. This would improve the percentage of educated youngsters, which would hopefully give future generations more working options. By raising pay substantially to adults who did work, it was hoped that living conditions would also improve.

=== Methods used ===
The main change which was made to the football stitching industry was the centralisation of workers. To monitor employees effectively and thus ensure that no children were being utilized as labour, it was necessary to have all stitchers working in a centralised location. Due to religious beliefs in Pakistan, men and women were segregated at work. All employees were required to register to work which ensured that no children could work. The Independent Monitoring Association for Child Labor (IMAC), established in 2002, became responsible for monitoring the age of workers. The centralised location also made it easier to monitor health and safety and general working conditions. Contractors were required to register themselves and each stitching facility which was in operation. This would ensure that manufacturers which participated in the "Fair Pay - Fair Play" scheme would only receive genuine 'fair play footballs'.

The amount by which each employee was paid also increased. Stitchers received 47 rupees (0.65 euros) per football; a rise of 57% (from 27 rupees). This would mean a rise in the cost of any 'fair play' footballs purchased in the west, a cost which GEPA hoped would not deter buyers. The price hike was an alternative plan to having organizations and individuals donating money. One section of the agreement stated a desire to change attitudes towards football manufacture - in Pakistan and also among Westerners. The rise which 'fair play' workers received would go towards relocating families nearer to work and child education fees.

The participation of The Soccer Industry Council of America (SICA) would also help to address the problem. The council donated $100,000 in the 24 months after the agreement was reached. This money would be used to set up a Social Protection Program for workers. This would help maintain the improved conditions among workers any child workers.

== Post-agreement ==
One of the parties affected by the agreement was Talon Sports. Talon is the employer of the majority of stitchers in Sialkot. The agreement meant that the company ended up employing 44,000 people in centralised locations. The company now produces 35 million footballs every year.

Adidas was among the large brands which pledged to only purchase footballs from manufacturers who were in good standing with the agreement. Though world cup balls are no longer manufactured in Pakistan, Adidas buy some hand-sewn balls from Sialkot. There are 5 other brands which take part in the agreement. 5% of all footballs sold in the west are 'fair trade' footballs. The main charities which were originally involved with the agreement were IPEC, UNICEF and SCCI. Since being founded, the agreement now has support of the Save The Children.

=== Positive feedback on the agreement ===
The main positive outcome of the agreement was the great reduction in children working. However some families are now worse off because they are not receiving income from their children and often one of the parents has to stay at home and look after the children because they are still not receiving an education. Therefore, conditions in the work place drastically improved, due to the centralised facilities, since health and safety could be monitored. The rise in stitchers' wages also helped to raise the standard of living.
