= Ganesh Das =

19th-century Punjabi historian

Ganesh Das Bhadera (Ganeśdās Baḍehra), also known as Ganesh Das Vadhera, was a 19th-century Punjabi historian and official. He served as the Qanungo (hereditary revenue officer) under Maharaja Ranjit Singh. He is best known for his Chār-Bāgh-i-Punjab (1854/55) and Rājdarshani (1847). A chronicler of much reputation, he also authored Chīragh-i-Panjab (1846/47) on the history of the Sikhs.

Ganesh Das belonged to a Khatri family from Gujrat and was the qānungo (revenue officer) of the city for Sikh Empire. Earlier his father Shiv Dayal had served as revenue officer of Gujrat for Sardar Gulab Singh of Bhangi Misl as well.

Ganesh Das completed his first work, named Chīragh-i-Panjab, in 1846/47 and presented it to the Nazim of Punjab — presumably Sir Henry Lawrence. Ganesh Das wrote his Risala'i Şahib Numā' (also known as Chahar Gulshan-i-Punjab) in 1849, which he later updated and presented to Richard Temple (settlement officer of Gujrat during 1852–54) as Tarikh-i-Punjab, also known Chār-Bāgh-i-Punjab, in 1854/55; the Chahar Gulshan-i-Punjab is considered supplement to his magnum opus Chār-Bāgh-i-Punjab. It is a detailed account of the history and geography of Punjab and the 19th century Punjabi society.

Ganesh Das was employed in the revenue department by Gulab Singh after the founding of Jammu and Kashmir in March 1846. He completed his Rājdarshani on the history of Jammu in 1847, named in parallel to Kalhana's Rajatarangini.

== Works ==
Critical editions of works by Ganesh Das:

- Banga, Indu; Grewal, J. S., eds. (2016). Early Nineteenth Century Panjab: From Ganesh Das's Chār Bāgh-i-Panjāb. Translated by Banga, Indu; Grewal, J. S. London New York: Routledge. ISBN 978-0-8153-9591-1.
- Badchra, G. D., ed. (1998). Rajdarshani: Persian History of North Western India from Earliest Times to 1847. Translated by Charak, Sukhdev Singh. Vishwavidyalaya Prakashan, Premier Publishers & Booksellers. ISBN 978-81-7124-000-5.

== See also ==
- Zafarnama-i-Ranjit Singh
- Sohan Lal Suri
- Bute Shah
