= Siranwali =

سرانوالی
- Town Village
- Siranwali
- Location in Pakistan
- Coordinates: 32°11′N 74°24′E
- Country: Pakistan
- Region: (Punjab, Pakistan) Punjab
- Tehsil: Daska
- District: Sialkot
- Founder: Chaudhry Hassan Sandhu
- Elevation: 232 m (761 ft)
- Time zone: UTC+5 (PST)
- Area code: 052
- Website: siranwali.com

Siranwali (Urdu: سرانوالی) is a town of Daska Tehsil on the Gujranwala-Pasrur road in Sialkot District, Punjab, Pakistan. The town was founded around the year 1500 by a Sandhu Jatt warrior called Chaudhry Hassan Sandhu. The Sandhu Jatts of Siranwali became very powerful during the reign of Maharaja Kharak Singh. Sardar Mangal Singh Sandhu of Siranwali was the brother in law of Maharaja Kharak Singh and managed his civil and military matters and also accompanied him in his battles.

== History ==
The Sandhu clan of Siranwali rose position and power under Sandhawalia Jat rule of Maharaja Ranjit Singh. He awarded this jagir to Sardar Lal Singh Sandhu whose daughter married to Ranjit Singh's elder son Kharak Singh in 1840. After the decline of Sikh empire in 1849, this region was captured by British rule in India.

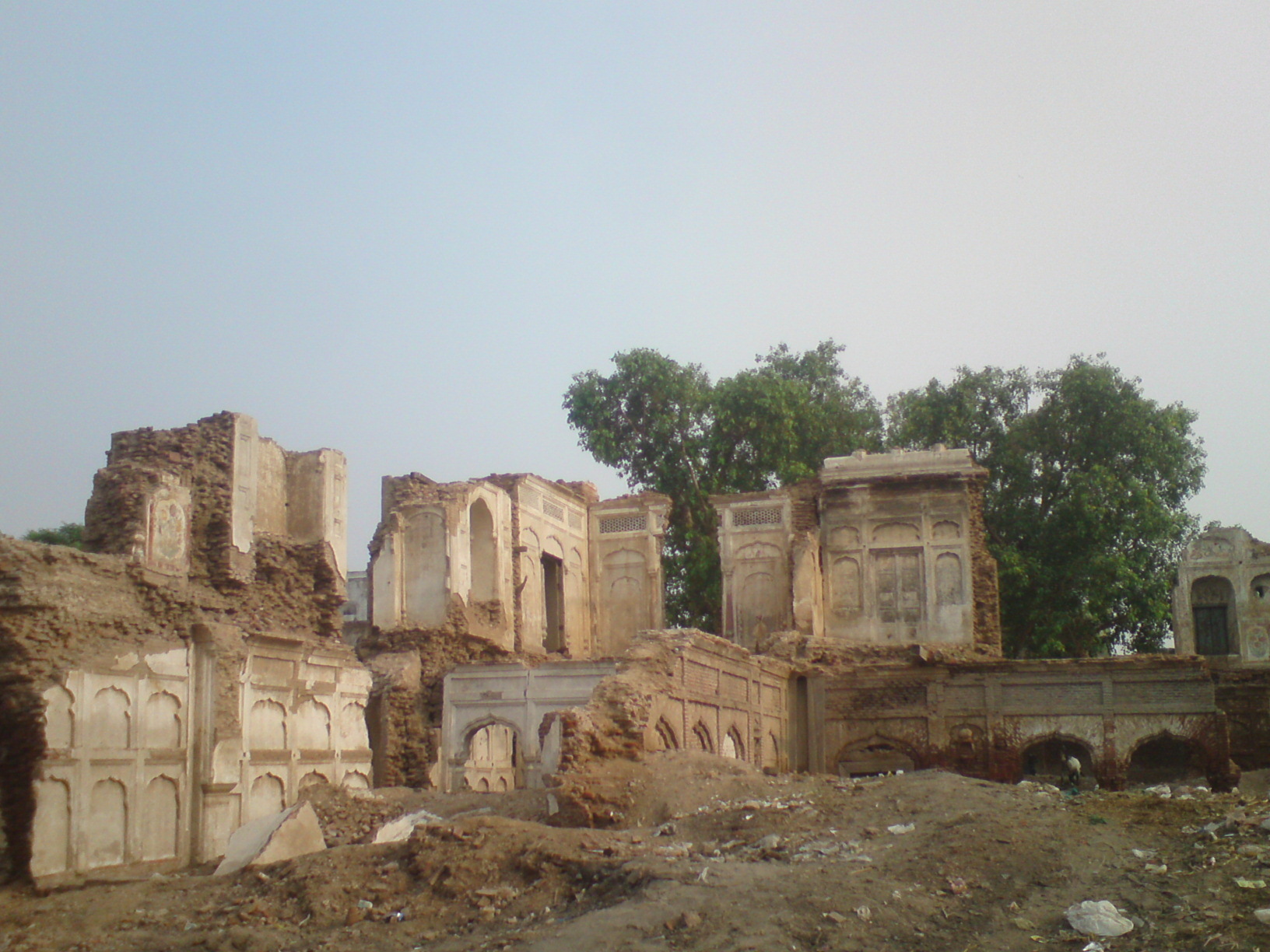
Ruins of mansion of Sikh's era

The predominantly Muslim population supported the All-India Muslim League and Pakistan Movement. After the Independence of Pakistan in 1947, the minority Hindus and Sikhs migrated to India while the Muslim refugees from India settled in the Sialkot. The ruling family departed for India. Their mansion was subsequently acquired by Mewati-speaking Muslim refugees.

== Overview ==
The town is home to grain markets which provides jobs to over fifty thousand people. There are over thirty rice mills located in the area, making it one of the major grain markets in the Punjab region. The town is located close to, and partly merged with, Mianwali Bangla.

=== Demographics ===
The town is home to above 13 thousands people and have an area of 2165 acres. The majority of the population are Mewati-speaking, with Punjabi-speaking people forming the next largest group. Urdu is also spoken.
