= Hilal-e-Istaqlal =

Hilal-e-Istaqlal (Urdu: ہلالِ استقلال) is an honour awarded to civilians in Pakistan. The name translates as Crescent of Independence.

In 1966, the Government of Pakistan awarded Hilal-e-Istaqlal to Lahore, Sargodha and Sialkot for showing severe resistance to the enemy during the Indo-Pakistani War of 1965 as these cities were targets of the Indian advance. Every year on Defence Day (6 September), this flag is hoisted in these cities in recognition of the will, courage and perseverance of their people.

== See also ==
- Civil decorations of Pakistan
