= Sialkot Dry Port =

Dry port in Punjab, Pakistan

Sialkot Dry Port خشک بندرگاہ سيالكوٹ

Location
- Country: Pakistan
- Location: Sialkot, Punjab

Details
- Opened: 16 May 1984

Statistics
- Website sdpt.org.pk

Sialkot Dry Port (Urdu: سيالكوٹ خشک بندرگاہ) is located in Sambrial, Punjab, Pakistan, 15 km west of Sialkot and 4 km south of Sialkot International Airport. The dry port provides transportation, logistics and supply chain services to connect Sialkot's robust, largely export-oriented, economy to domestic and international markets as well as several other nearby cities, including Gujranwala, Wazirabad and Gujrat. The port is a joint venture of the business community in Sialkot, who on 16 May 1984 formed the "Sialkot Dry Port Trust". The dry port was formally inaugurated in 1986.

== See also ==
- Dry Ports in Pakistan
