= Euthydemia =

Euthymedia or Euthydemia (Greek: Ευθυμεδεία) was the ancient city of Sagala belonging to the Bactrian Dynasty, now located in modern-day Sialkot, Pakistan. The British classical scholar William Woodthorpe Tarn, suggested that "Euthydemia" was never assigned as a new name for ancient Sagala, and that the name was actually Euthymedeia. The altered name was suggested to have been a 1738 alteration made by historian T Beyer. The city was mentioned by Ptolemy in his 1st century BCE work, Geography.

In the 2nd century BCE, Euthydemia also known as Sagala, was made the capital of the Indo-Greek kingdom by the buddhist King Menander (Milinda), as recorded in the Buddhist text Milinda Panha.
