= Mianwali Bangla =

- Country: Pakistan
- Province: Punjab
- District: Sialkot
- Time zone: UTC+5 (PST)

Mianwali Bangla (Urdu: مِيانوالى بنٚگلا, Punjabi: مِيانوالى بنٚگلا) is a small village. In recent years, it has expanded into a town located on Gujranwala-Pasrur Road in Sialkot District, Pakistan.

The BRB Canal divides the town into two parts: the old town is on the left bank and on the other side is the new area called Bangla or Main Bazar.

Population from adjoining villages like Weerwala, Changi, Sakhana Bajwa, Dheerki, Siyan, etc. has shifted to the town.

Nowadays, Mianwali Bangla is almost merged with Siranwali and Satrah.

== History ==
The town was the site of the Irrigation Rest House and staff colony settled by the British Raj government. Now, the rest house and the staff colony are almost ruined. There are rumors about the auction of the Rest House.

== Advancement ==
A bazaar with a few medical stores, grocery and clothing shops, agriculture, tools industry, rice mills, engineering, the Chenab School, restaurants, and taxi & bus stands are all facilitating people of the town and nearby villages. A major grain market and rice production industry settled here. The town has been growing rapidly for the last few years.
