= Indu Banga =

Indian historian

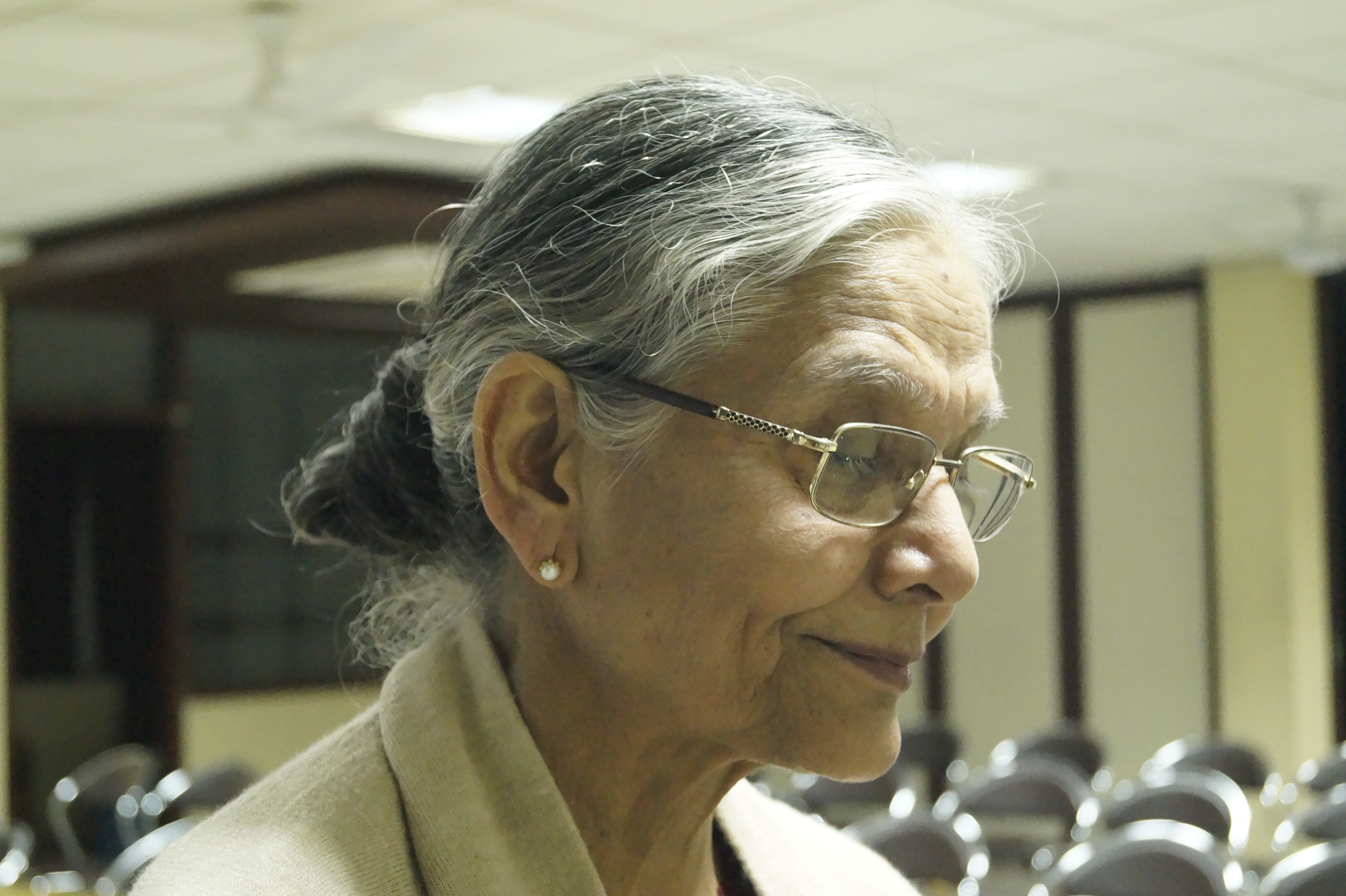
- Banga in 2016

Indu Banga is an Indian historian who specializes in the history of Punjab. She works at the Department of History of Panjab University, Chandigarh.

== Bibliography ==
- Banga, Indu (1971). Religious land grants under the Sikh rule. Punjab History Conference Proceedings, 6th session, March 1971, 144–51.
- Banga, Indu. Sikh revenue administration. In J.S. Grewal, Ed. Studies in local and regional history. Amritsar: Guru Nanak Dev University, 1974, pp. 55–85.
- Banga, Indu (1978). Agrarian system of the Sikhs: Late 18th and early 19th century. New Delhi: Manohar Book Service. 1978, 260p.
- Banga, Indu (1980). State formation under Sikh rule. Journal of Regional History, 1, 1980, 15–35.
- Banga, Indu (1981). The Sikh polity during the fifteenth century. Punjab History Conference Proceedings, 15th session, Mar 1981, 105–110.
- Banga, Indu (1991). The City in Indian History: Urban Demography, Society, and Politics
- Banga, Indu (1992). Ports and their hinterlands in India, 1700–1950
- Banga, Indu (1997). Formation of Sikh state, 1765–1845. In Indu Banga, Ed. Five Punjabi centuries: Polity, economy, society and culture, 1500–1990. New Delhi: Manohar, 1997, pp. 84–111.
- Banga, Indu (1998) Punjab in prosperity and violence: administration, politics, and social change, 1947–1997
- Banga, Indu. The Sikhs under colonial rule. In J.S. Grewal and Indu Banga, Eds. History and ideology: The Khalsa over 300 years. New Delhi: Tulika Books, 1999, pp. 111–20.
- Banga, Indu (1999). The Punjab under Sikh rule: Formation of a regional state. In J.S. Grewal and Indu Banga, Eds. History and ideology: The Khalsa over 300 years. New Delhi: Tulika Books, 1999, pp. 68–76.
- Banga, Indu (1999). Sikh perception in the thirties. Seminar, 476, Apr 1999, 41–45.
- Banga, Indu (2000) Lala Lajpat Rai in Retrospect: Political, Economic, Social, and Cultural Concerns
