= Rana Mashhood Ahmad Khan =

Pakistani politician and lawyer

Rana Mashood Ahmad Khan
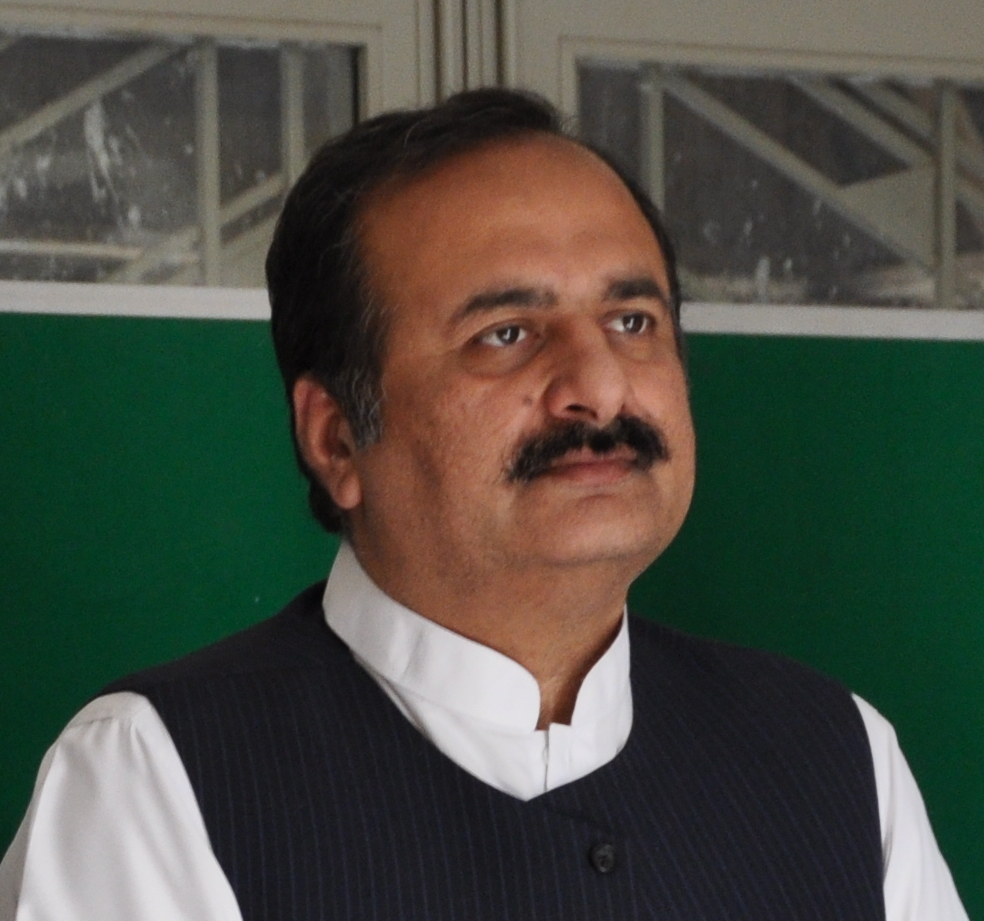

Chairman of Prime Minister's Youth Programme
- Incumbent
- Assumed office 31 March 2024
- President: Asif Ali Zardari
- Prime Minister: Shehbaz Sharif
- Preceded by: Usman Dar

Member of the Provincial Assembly of the Punjab
- In office 15 August 2018 – 14 January 2023
- Constituency: PP-152 Lahore-IX
- In office 10 October 2002 – 31 May 2018

Personal details
- Born: 26 August 1966 (age 60) Lahore, Punjab, Pakistan
- Party: PMLN (2002-present)

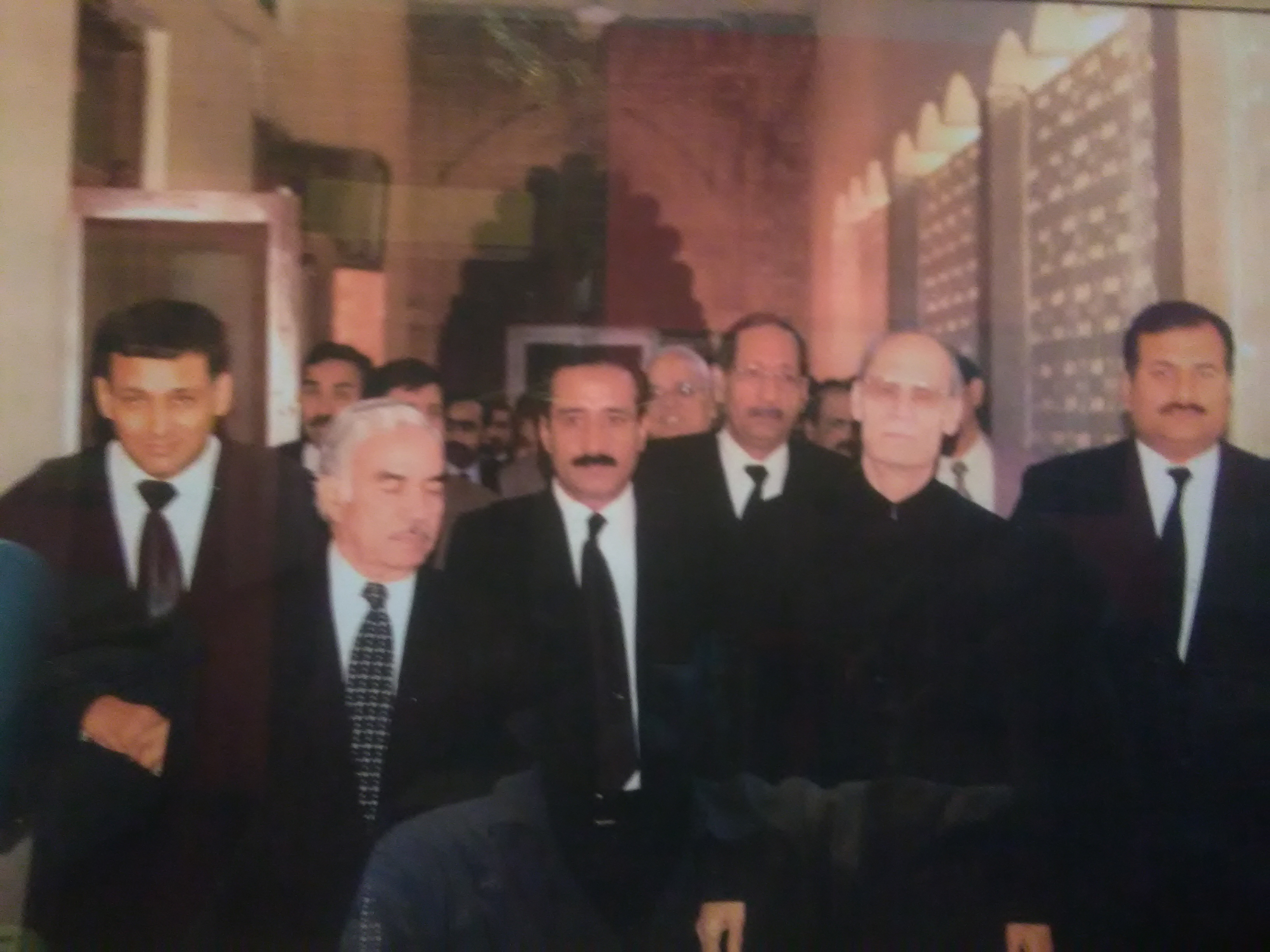
Left to right: Akhtar Aly Kureshy Advocate, Asrar-ul-Haq Mian President of Lahore High Court Bar Association, Mr. Ahsan Bhoon, Chief Justice Pakistan Justice Muhammad Bashir Jehangiri, Rana Mashood Ahmad Khan Secretary Lahore High Court Bar Association.

Rana Mashood Ahmad Khan is a Pakistani politician and lawyer who is Chairman of Prime Minister on Youth Program, since March 31, 2024.

Previously, he had been the member of the Provincial Assembly of the Punjab from 2002 to May 2018 and from August 2018 to January 2023. He served as the deputy speaker of the Punjab Assembly from 2008 to 2013 and Secretary Lahore High Court Bar Association.

In March 2024 he was appointed Chairman of Prime Minister on Youth Programme.

== Early life and education ==
He was born on 26 August 1966 in Lahore.

He did his matriculation from Crescent Model School Lahore. He received the degree of LL. B. Bachelor of Laws in 1991 from Punjab Law College. He also has a degree of Bachelor of Arts, which he got from University of the Punjab.

== Political career ==
Provincial Assembly of the Punjab

He was elected to the Provincial Assembly of the Punjab as a candidate of Pakistan Muslim League (N) (PML-N) from Constituency PP-149 (Lahore-XIII) in the 2002 Pakistani general election. He received 13,300 votes and defeated a candidate of Pakistan Muslim League (Q).

He was re-elected to the Provincial Assembly of the Punjab as a candidate of PML-N from Constituency PP-149 (Lahore-XIII) in the 2008 Pakistani general election. He received 36,212 votes and defeated Syed Nazim Hussain Shah, a candidate of Pakistan People's Party. He was elected as Deputy Speaker of Punjab Assembly in April 2008 where he served until 2013.

He was re-elected to the Provincial Assembly of the Punjab as a candidate of PML-N from Constituency PP-149 (Lahore-XIII) in the 2013 Pakistani general election. In June 2013, he was inducted into the provincial cabinet of Chief Minister Shehbaz Sharif and was made the provincial minister for school education with additional charge of higher education and youth affairs, sports, archaeology and tourism. He was given additional ministerial portfolio of law and parliamentary affairs in June 2014 where he served under October 2014. In a cabinet reshuffle in November 2016, he was made the provincial minister for school education.

He was re-elected to Provincial Assembly of the Punjab as a candidate of PML-N from Constituency PP-152 (Lahore-IX) in the 2018 Pakistani general election.
