= Syed Nazim Hussain Shah =

Syed Nazim Hussain Shah may refer to:

- Syed Nazim Hussain Shah (politician, born 1940)
- Syed Nazim Hussain Shah (politician, born 1950)
