= Leila Khan =

Pakistani politician

Minister of State for Federal Education and Professional Training
- In office 27 April 2018 – 31 May 2018
- President: Mamnoon Hussain
- Prime Minister: Shahid Khaqan Abbasi

Member of the National Assembly of Pakistan
- In office 1 June 2013 – 31 May 2018
- Constituency: Reserved seat for women

Chairman of the Prime Minister's Youth Programme
- In office 17 November 2014 – 31 May 2018
- Prime Minister: Nawaz
- Preceded by: Maryam Nawaz
- Succeeded by: Usman Dar

Personal details
- Party: PML(N)

Leila Khan (Urdu: لیلہ خان) is a Pakistani politician who served as Minister of State for Federal Education and Professional Training, in Abbasi cabinet from April 2018 to May 2018. She had been a member of the National Assembly of Pakistan from June 2013 to May 2018.

== Education ==
She has done graduation in mass communication studies. She is also part of public committee funds.

== Political career ==
She was elected to the National Assembly of Pakistan as a candidate of Pakistan Muslim League (N) on a reserved seats for women from Punjab in the 2013 Pakistani general election.

In December 2014, she was appointed as chairperson of Prime Minister’s Youth Programme following the resignation of Maryam Nawaz with whom she has worked as adviser. In April 2018, she was inducted into the federal cabinet of Prime Minister Shahid Khaqan Abbasi and was appointed as Minister of State for Federal Education and Professional Training. Upon the dissolution of the National Assembly on the expiration of its term on 31 May 2018, Khan ceased to hold the office as Minister of State for Federal Education and Professional Training.
