= Prime Minister's Laptop Scheme =

2010s Government programme in Pakistan

The Prime Minister's Laptop Scheme (or Prime Minister's National Laptop Scheme) was an initiative undertaken by then Prime Minister of Pakistan Mian Muhammad Nawaz Sharif as a part of the Prime Minister’s Youth Programme. The program aimed at provision of laptops to deserving students studying in public and semi-public universities throughout Pakistan. The Government of Pakistan Tehreek-e-Insaf abolished this scheme along with many others.

== Date of Initiation ==
The scheme was formally initiated on 23 May 2014, with the aim to award students attaining higher marks in public and semi-public universities with free laptops under the program.

== Phase I ==
Phase I of the scheme was based on the marks(or grades) obtained during(or cumulative up to) the academic year 2013–14.

== Phase II ==
Phase II of the scheme was based on the marks 448 (or grades) C obtained during(or cumulative up to) the academic year 2014–2015. The laptops distributed during Phase II were detachable with free Evo connectivity and sim enabled.

== Phase III ==
Phase III of the scheme is complete.

== Phase IV ==
Prime Minister’s Laptop Scheme Phase 4 & 5 are completed.
