= Maryam Nawaz =

Chief Minister of Punjab (born 1973)

- مریم نواز
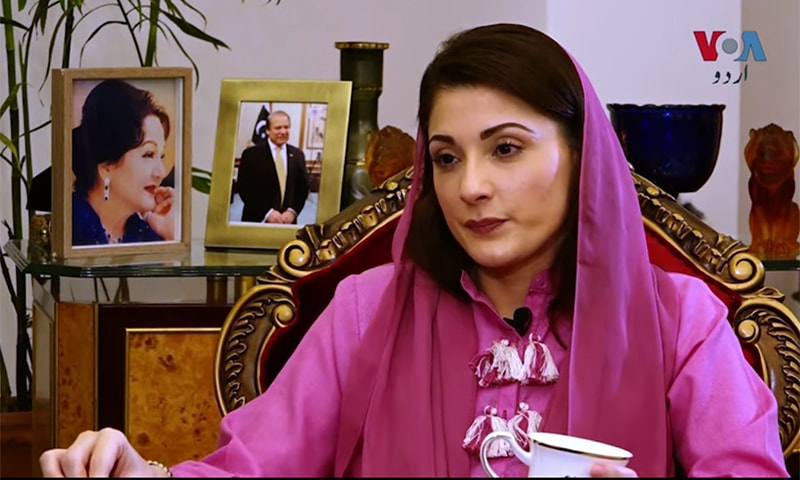
- Sharif in 2019

19th Chief Minister of Punjab
- Incumbent
- Assumed office 26 February 2024
- Governor: Baligh Ur Rehman; Sardar Saleem Haider Khan
- Preceded by: Mohsin Naqvi

Member of the Provincial Assembly of the Punjab
- Incumbent
- Assumed office 23 February 2024
- Preceded by: Murad Raas
- Constituency: PP-159 Lahore-XV
- Majority: 2,106 (3.45%)

Vice President of the PML(N)
- Incumbent
- Assumed office 3 January 2023
- Preceded by: Shahid Khaqan Abbasi

Chairperson of the Prime Minister's Youth Programme
- In office 22 November 2013 – 13 November 2014
- Preceded by: Office established
- Succeeded by: Leila Khan

Personal details
- Born: Maryam Nawaz Sharif; 28 October 1973 (age 53) Lahore, Punjab, Pakistan
- Party: PML(N) (since 2007)
- Spouse: Muhammad Safdar Awan (m. 1992)
- Children: 3
- Parent(s): Nawaz Sharif (father); Kalsoom Nawaz (mother)
- Relatives: Sharif family
- Education: University of the Punjab (unproven) (Note: See #Early life and education section)

Maryam Nawaz Sharif (Note: Punjabi/Urdu: مریم نواز شریف) (born 28 October 1973) is a Pakistani politician who has served as the 19th chief minister of Punjab since 26 February 2024. She is the first woman to hold the position of chief minister in Pakistan.

Born to former prime minister Nawaz Sharif in Lahore, Punjab in 1973, she began her political career in 2012 when she took charge of the PMLN's election campaign for the 2013 Pakistani general election. Following the election, she was appointed the chairperson of the Prime Minister's Youth Programme in 2013. She resigned from the position in 2014 after her appointment was challenged in the Lahore High Court, who ordered to remove her, amid allegations of nepotism and dubious academic credentials. The Attorney General, representing Maryam, attempted to use her Wikipedia page to prove her credentials. After her election to the Provincial Assembly of the Punjab in the controversial 2024 Pakistani general election, Maryam was appointed chief minister of Punjab.

== Early life and education ==
Maryam Nawaz Sharif was born on 28 October 1973 in Lahore, Punjab, Pakistan, to Nawaz Sharif and Kulsoom Butt. She is of Punjabi Kashmiri descent and is the eldest of four siblings, including her sister Asma.

She received her early education at the Convent of Jesus and Mary, Lahore, completing pre-nursery through the 10th grade. She then completed her FSc at Lahore College for Women, graduating in 1991.

After being rejected by Kinnaird College due to poor academic standing, her father, Nawaz Sharif, then-chief minister of Punjab, intervened by suspending the principal. However, a strike organised by college students and staff led to the principal's reinstatement. Maryam subsequently enrolled in King Edward Medical College (KEMC) in the late 1980s through transfer of certificate with the intention of becoming a medical doctor.

Maryam later enrolled at Fatima Jinnah Medical College in Lahore, but did not complete her education, leaving her studies in 1992 after her marriage to Capt. Safdar Awan. She married Safdar Awan, her father's military secretary, at the age of 19. Maryam has three children with Safdar: a son, Junaid, and two daughters, Mahnoor and Mehr-un-Nisa.

Maryam claimed to have completed her undergraduate studies at the University of the Punjab, from where she stated she had a master's degree in English literature. In 2012, it was reported that she was doing her PhD degree on post-9/11 radicalization in Pakistan and was described as being fond of postcolonial writers such as Chinua Achebe and Faiz Ahmad Faiz.

In 2014, the Lahore High Court questioned the validity of her master's degree in English literature and her PhD in political science. The deputy attorney general, who was representing Maryam, presented her academic credentials but withdrew them when asked whether her PhD was earned or honorary. He also said that the details presented before the court were from Wikipedia. By 2018, when submitting records to the Election Commission of Pakistan, Maryam declared only her master's degree in English literature.

== Political career ==
=== Early political career ===
Maryam was detained for the first time on 12 October 1999, following the 1999 Pakistani coup d'état led by Gen Pervez Musharraf, which ousted her father, then Prime Minister Nawaz Sharif. Arrested by female members of the Pakistan Army Corps of Military Police, she along with her mother Kulsoom Nawaz and other female members of the Sharif family was promptly transferred to her residence where they were placed under house arrest, in contrast to her father, who was taken to Adiala Jail. In November 1999, she, along with other female members of the Sharif family, was granted release on "humanitarian grounds" at the request of a Arab ruler. Maryam's first notable appearance was in a BBC interview, where she recounted her father's imprisonment by General Pervez Musharraf and appealed for public support for her father Nawaz. She and her mother gained prominence during this period. After being released from a four-month house arrest, she found herself shuttling between prisons, as she listened to the charges of corruption, terrorism, and tax evasion against her father. Later, she, along with 22 members of the Sharif family, was sent into exile in Saudi Arabia. During her long exile, she prioritized her role in raising her children during and also became fluent in Arabic.

Prior to entering politics, she remained involved in the family's philanthropic organisation and served as the chairperson of Sharif Trust, Sharif Medical City, and Sharif Education Institutes since 1997. All of these were established by her grandfather, Muhammad Sharif.

In November 2011, Nawaz Sharif granted her permission to enter politics after she expressed her intention to do so. In 2012, Maryam collaborated with PML-N leaders to prepare the Punjab Women Empowerment Package, initiated by her uncle Shehbaz Sharif, then chief minister of Punjab, in addition to playing a role in the implementation of the women-only Pink Bus scheme in Punjab during the same year. Reportedly, Maryam also contributed to various initiatives aimed at women's welfare in Punjab. During her political debut, she began visiting educational institutes to give speeches on education and women's rights.

She largely remained out of the spotlight till 2013 when she was put in charge of Nawaz Sharif's successful election campaign during the 2013 Pakistani general election where she reportedly played a prominent role. She was credited for her efforts in galvanizing public sentiment through social media prior to and after the 2013 election. At one point during the 2013 election campaign, she was considered a potential candidate for the chief minister of Punjab, although she ultimately did not run in the general election. Maryam was positioned by the PML-N as a counterbalance to the youth following enjoyed by PTI's Imran Khan. At one point, she was seen distributing laptops to students on behalf of the Punjab government, despite holding no public office either in the Punjab or in the federal government.

=== 2013–2014: Chairperson of the Prime Minister's Youth Programme ===
After her father assumed power and became prime minister, she was appointed the chairperson of the Prime Minister's Youth Programme on 22 November 2013. However, her appointment was called into question by the Pakistan Tehreek-e-Insaf (PTI) which termed the appointment a case of nepotism and moved the Lahore High Court in October 2014. The PTI also accused her of misusing government funds for her own image-building. Questions were also raised regarding her academic credentials, including her degrees in M.A. (English Literature) and Ph.D. in Political Science. The Deputy Attorney General, representing Maryam, presented information from her Wikipedia biography page to prove her academic credentials. On 12 November 2014, the Lahore High Court ordered the federal government to remove her. The next day, Maryam resigned from the chairpersonship.

=== Initial controversies and challenges ===
Afterwards, Maryam established a Strategic Media Communications Cell within the Prime Minister's Office and also assumed control of PML-N social media to address the challenges posed by PTI. In 2016, she garnered significant media attention when the then Prime Minister, Nawaz Sharif, underwent open-heart surgery in the UK. Rather than accompanying her father to the UK, Maryam remained in Prime Minister House and assumed responsibility for media management. She provided updates on her father's medical condition to the press through her Twitter account. However her permanent residence in the Prime Minister House as a "dependent" of the prime minister also raised questions. Additionally, her alleged involvement with the strategic media cell had been a subject of media discourse. During Nawaz Sharif's absence from the country, she was proved to be an effective leader of PML-N.

In 2017, she faced accusations of supporting blasphemous content after a group of dissenting bloggers was abducted by Pakistani intelligence agencies. After release of bloggers, they disclosed that they had resisted giving a forced confession. The confession they were pressured to make implicated Maryam in allegedly operating a blasphemous Facebook page called 'Bhensa' under the direction of the Research and Analysis Wing (R&AW).

She became involved in electoral politics in 2017 following her father Nawaz Sharif's disqualification from holding the prime ministership and his conviction by the Supreme Court of Pakistan in connection with the Panama Papers case. Maryam campaigned for her mother, Kulsoom Nawaz, during the by-elections in Constituency NA-120 (Lahore-III). Although her mother won the seat, the victory margin notably decreased. There was significant discussion surrounding Maryam's role in the election campaign. Many observers interpreted her involvement in the campaign as a significant step in her formal entry into the succession and party leadership race. After Nawaz Sharif's removal, Maryam was regarded as the party's anti-establishment figurehead.

=== Trial and conviction ===
Reportedly, the Judiciary of Pakistan also played a crucial role in attempting to sideline her from Pakistani politics and a systematic propaganda campaign was orchestrated by an officer of the ISI and over ten thousand paid interns of an organization tasked with conducting a social media campaign against Nawaz Sharif and Maryam Nawaz Sharif. In June 2018, when she was allocated a PML-N ticket to contest the 2018 general election from Constituency NA-127 (Lahore-V) and Constituency PP-173 Lahore-XXX, she was sentenced to 7 years in jail on corruption charges in the Avenfield case filed by the National Accountability Bureau (NAB), while her father Nawaz Sharif received a 10-year sentence in a 9-month-long trial. She received a 7-year sentence for abetment after being found "instrumental in concealing her father's properties," which also included 1 year for non-cooperation with the NAB. According to the verdict, she "aided, assisted, abetted, attempted and acted in conspiracy with her father".

As a result, she was disqualified from politics for 10 years following which PML-N nominated Ali Pervaiz Malik and Irfan Shafi Khokhar to contest the 2018 elections in Constituencies NA-127 (Lahore-V) and PP-173 Lahore-XXX, respectively. On 13 July 2018, Maryam along with her father Nawaz were arrested by NAB officials upon their arrival in Pakistan and subsequently transferred to Adiala Jail. After her mother Kulsoom Nawaz died in London on 11 September 2018 after suffering cardiac arrest, both Maryam and Nawaz were granted timed-parole in order to attend her funeral.

In July 2018, Islamabad High Court judge Shaukat Aziz Siddiqui accused ISI officials and then Chief Justice of Pakistan Saqib Nisar of pressuring him to ensure the conviction of Maryam and Nawaz and keep them out of politics. She later appealed against her conviction in the Islamabad High Court, after which she and her father were released from Adiala Jail on 19 September 2018 after the Islamabad High Court granted them bail and suspended their respective prison terms in the Avenfield corruption case.

Following Maryam's repeated tirades against Imran Khan and his wife, at one point during a rally, Khan made a remark which was criticized for being misogynistic and sexist against Maryam, cautioning her to be careful, suggesting that her husband, Safdar, might become upset over her "passionately" mentions of Imran during her speeches. The remark was criticized by some of Khan's own supporters and was widely condemned. Social media also remained buzzed with discussions about Maryam's age, clothing, and accessories At one point, the then Federal Minister for Kashmir Affairs, Ali Amin Gandapur, claimed that Maryam had spent Rs 80 million on surgery and vowed to reveal her true appearance to the public by undoing the effects of cosmetic surgery. In a July 2019 interview with Voice of America, she acknowledged her political journey was more challenging than expected and admitted facing resistance from within her father's party, PML-N. Dawn wrote PML-N stalwarts were not particularly impressed by how rapidly she ascended through the ranks, especially in a party largely dominated by men and with minimal women in leadership positions. Throughout Imran Khan's four-year administration, Maryam continued to faced threats and intimidation from the government. On one occasion, her father Nawaz Sharif cautioned that if any harm befell his daughter, individuals including PM Imran Khan, COAS General Qamar Javed Bajwa, and DG ISI Lt Gen Faiz Hameed, would bear responsibility.

In July 2019, Maryam released a secretly recorded video in which Accountability Judge Arshad Malik, who had sentenced Nawaz to seven years in jail in the Al-Azizia Steel Mills corruption reference in December 2018, "confessed" he had been “pressurised and blackmailed” to convict Nawaz. Subsequently, the Islamabad High Court removed Malik from his post.

She faced another arrest by the NAB Lahore on 8 August 2019, this time in connection with the Chaudhry Sugar Mills corruption case. She was taken into custody at Kot Lakhpat Jail where she was on her weekly visit to meet her father, Nawaz Sharif. She then approached the Lahore High Court which on 6 November 2019, granted her bail and ordered to release her. She alleged that authorities had installed cameras in her jail cell and bathroom.

=== Prominence during father's exile ===
On 19 November 2019, her father Nawaz Sharif departed for the United Kingdom just 20 days after being released on bail.

Maryam became increasingly involved in politics during her father's four-year self-imposed exile in the United Kingdom. In 2019, she was appointed as vice president of PML-N. She then led anti-government rallies throughout the country, fiercely denouncing Imran Khan, the PTI, as well the military and judiciary for her father's ousting and allegedly facilitating the rise of the then-PTI chairman to power.

In 2020, during an interview with BBC Urdu, Maryam hinted at the potential for dialogue between her party and the then army leadership, whom her father, Nawaz Sharif, has accused of orchestrating his removal as prime minister. However, she suggested that such discussions would only take place after the PTI government had been removed from power.

On 19 October 2020, Maryam, along with the senior leadership of the Pakistan Democratic Movement (PDM) and numerous workers, entered the hallway in Mazar-e-Quaid in Karachi to offer fateha. After the fateha concluded, PML-N workers began chanting slogans in support of Maryam. Her husband Safdar also started chanting slogans, which went against the protocol of the mausoleum. Many social media users regarded the incident as disrespectful and expressed their anger towards Safdar and Maryam. Later that night, personnel from the Inter-Services Intelligence (ISI) and Sindh Rangers raided the hotel room where Maryam and her husband Safdar were staying, purportedly due to accusations of "violating the sanctity of Mazar-e-Quaid. Following Safdar's arrest, there were allegations that the Inspector General of Sindh Police was also kidnapped and coerced by officials of the ISI and Sindh Rangers into registering the First Information Report (FIR) against Maryam, and her husband Safdar for the violating the sanctity of Mazar-e-Quaid. Maryam also claimed that the Sindh police chief was forcibly taken to the ISI sector commander's office and pressured to sign her arrest warrants, however, when the IG Police showed reluctance, it was decided that the arrest would be conducted by the Sindh Rangers. Then Army Chief Gen Qamar Javed Bajwa also took notice of the incident and instructed the Karachi Corps Commander to conduct an immediate inquiry.

On 21 August, her son Junaid got married in the London. However, Maryam and her husband Safdar were unable to attend the nikkah ceremony as their passports had been confiscated by the government due to ongoing legal proceedings against them.

On 29 September 2022, soon after Maryam's uncle Shehbaz Sharif came into power, the Islamabad High Court overturned her corruption conviction in the Avenfield case and refused to pursue many of the cases against her relatives, and she then became eligible to contest elections again. However, she seemed to step back as the Pakistan Democratic Movement, a coalition of political parties, gained momentum, and her uncle Shehbaz Sharif emerged as the opposition's candidate for the next prime minister. Following Shehbaz Sharif's election as the country's prime minister, her influence within the party waned, and her political presence became sporadic.

In October 2022, the Lahore High Court directed officials to return Maryam's passport, which she had surrendered since November 2019 when LHC had granted her post-arrest bail in the Chaudhry Sugar Mills case but asked her to submit her passport as they feared she might flee the country. Following the retrieval of her passport, she traveled to London to reunite with her father, who had been there since November 2019.

=== Party leadership role ===
On 3 January 2023, Maryam was appointed as senior vice president of the PML-N, making her one of the PML-N’s senior-most leaders. The decision was approved by the Shehbaz Sharif, who was also the party's president. She was also appointed as the "Chief Organizer" of the party with the mandate to restructuring and reorganizing the party at all levels. Numerous senior leaders within the PML-N expressed regret and displeasure over the lack of consultation preceding Maryam's appointment, which positioned her as the second most senior figure in the party, following her uncle Shehbaz. A leader from the PML-N described Maryam's rise within the party as a direct indication from Nawaz Sharif to the Shehbaz that she, rather than Shehbaz, would be his successor. He further stated that any senior leader who dared to challenge her authority would face a fate similar to that of Chaudhary Nisar Ali Khan who gradually withdrew from politics after 2018 general election. Some sources suggested that Nisar Ali Khan discontent stemmed from the increasing prominence given to Maryam within the party hierarchy. Former Prime Minister Shahid Khaqan Abbasi, resigned as senior vice president of PML-N within an hour of the announcement of Maryam's promotion He later quit PML-N in December 2023. He characterized Maryam's approach to politics as more aggressive and less inclined to consider opinions from individuals she may not favor. Similarly, Miftah Ismail, also decided to quit PML-N following his removal from his position as Federal Minister for Finance by her.

She was considered a challenger to her cousin, Hamza Shahbaz Sharif as the emergence of Maryam as a prominent figure within the PML-N dealt a blow to Hamza, who had been previously positioned as the natural successor to the Sharif brothers. However some political analysts viewed her appointment as a token gesture with little significance. They believed that her role would not have a substantial impact within the party, especially since she was not appointed as the party president, a position that holds absolute authority.

She underwent throat surgery in Geneva in early January before returning to Pakistan after spending three months in London on 28 January 2023.

While Nawaz Sharif was in London and ahead of the 2024 Pakistani general election, she conducted rallies and traversed across the country to garner support for her party. Despite skepticism regarding her leadership capabilities due to limited political experience, she managed to carry out organized rallies against the PTI government. Her mobilization of party workers at various venues, media appearances, and hosting of workers’ conventions contributed to sustaining the party's momentum.

In a February 2023 interview, she expressed that she had never considered joining politics at any point in her life. However, upon witnessing what she perceived as her father being oppressed by the powers that be, she decided to enter politics. After it was revealed that Nawaz Sharif is returning to Pakistan in October after ending his four-year self-imposed exile in the United Kingdom, Maryam became active again rallying support and emphasizing Nawaz Sharif's plans to revive the economy that had suffered under the PTI's rule. She began mobilizing party workers ahead of his father's return saying that "It will not be the return of an individual to the country. There will be the return of prosperity and hope for the country." A large rally was organized to welcome Nawaz upon his return to Pakistan on 21 October, marking the end of his four-year self-imposed exile in the UK.

=== Parliamentary debut ===
Ahead of the 2024 Pakistani general election, when the Supreme Court withdrew PTI's electoral symbol, the "cricket bat," Maryam welcomed the decision, stating that terrorists should not be allotted party symbols during a speech as she kicked off PML-N election campaign from Okara in January 2024.

On 12 January 2024, she filed nomination papers as a candidate of PML-N to contest the general election from constituencies NA-119 (Lahore-III) and PP-159 (Lahore-XV). This was her first time contesting in the general elections. On 21 January, reports emerged suggesting that PTI-backed candidate Mehr Muhammad Waseem declared his withdrawal in favor of Maryam from NA-119. However, this claim was debunked as fake news, as PTI had not awarded a ticket to anyone named Waseem in NA-119.

On the election day, she was elected to the National Assembly of Pakistan on form 47 representing Constituency NA-119 (Lahore-III) and to the Provincial Assembly of the Punjab, representing Constituency PP-159 (Lahore-XV) as a PML-N candidate. For the national assembly seat, she secured 83,855 votes and defeated PTI-backed candidate Shehzad Farooq, who received 68,376. Whereas for the provincial assembly seat, she secured 23,598 votes, with PTI-backed candidate Mehar Sharafat Ali receiving 21,491 votes, narrowly defeating him. PTI claimed that she was defeated from constituency Lahore's PP-159 by Mehar Sharafat Ali. PTI-backed Shahzad Farooq filed a petition in Lahore High Court against the NA-119 returning officer, alleging result manipulation however the court dismissed the petition and, advised the matter be taken to the ECP. Whereas in June, Mehar Sharafat Ali also contested Maryam's victory from PP-159 by filing an election petition, accusing her of rigging.

Following the election, she became the sixth member of the Sharif family to be elected to parliament. Later she was nominated by the PML-N as its candidate for Chief Minister of Punjab. Consequently, she relinquishes her seat in NA-119 (Lahore-III) and retaining her seat in PP-159 (Lahore-XV) to assume the role of Punjab's chief minister.

On 18 February 2024, it was reported that she had already begun fulfilling the duties of chief minister, receiving briefings from the Punjab chief secretary and Inspector General of Police at her residence. Additionally, she was provided with security measures typical of the chief minister's protocol, including two bulletproof cars, four police squad vehicles, a traffic wardens' pilot, and a signal jammer vehicle. On 23 February 2024, she was sworn in as a member of the Punjab Assembly for the first time, marking her parliamentary debut.

== Chief Minister of Punjab (2024–present) ==
On 25 February 2024, Maryam submitted her nomination papers for the office of Punjab Chief Minister, competing against PTI-backed Rana Aftab Ahmad Khan. Maryam was backed by PML-N, and its allies such as Pakistan People's Party (PPP), Pakistan Muslim League (Q) (PML-Q), and the Istehkam-e-Pakistan Party (IPP).

The next day, she was elected unopposed as the 20th Chief Minister of Punjab after securing 220 votes. This occurred after PTI decided to boycott the elections following Rana Aftab's request to address the House was denied by the speaker, Malik Ahmad Khan. As a result, 103 MPs of PTI walked out in protest and Rana Aftab did not receive any votes. Later the same day, she took the oath as Punjab Chief Minister, thus becoming first female chief minister in the history of Pakistan, and also becoming the fourth member of the Sharif family to be elected to the position.

Due to Maryam's lack of parliamentary experience, former federal minister of Information, Marriyum Aurangzeb who instead of being assigned to the federal government, was transferred to the Punjab government to assist Maryam in handling the provincial government's affairs. This caused a stir among the PML-N MPs in Punjab Assembly. She was appointed as a senior minister in the Maryam's provincial cabinet on 6 March. Former Federal Minister for Information, Pervaiz Rashid was also attached as a senior advisor to Maryam, to provide guidance on political matters in the government due to her limited experience. He actively participated in all administrative meetings chaired by Maryam since she assumed the role of Chief Minister of Punjab.

Shortly after assuming office as Chief Minister, she announced the establishment of first public cancer hospital to be built in Lahore. On 6 March, an 18-member provincial cabinet of Chief Minister Maryam, was sworn in.

In April 2024, following Maryam's accusation that Khyber Pakhtunkhwa was supplying metal kite strings to Punjab, PTI leaders condemned Maryam's remarks about Khyber Pakhtunkhwa and suggested that the Sharif family had a history of animosity towards the province.

In May 2024, her government introduced the controversial Punjab Defamation Bill, aiming to "stop fake news". The opposition in the Punjab Assembly argued that the PML-N government intended to restrict freedom of speech under the guise of defamation. The President of the Lahore Press Club criticized the bill in a press conference, stating, "The Maryam administration is on a dictatorial path to shut the eyes and mouths of journalists." Nevertheless, Maryam supported the bill, asserting that it was essential to put an end to "mud-slinging" online.

On 29 June 2024, her government completed its first 100 days. Several Pakistani celebrities praised her government's initial achievements, but the endorsements were also met with accusations of paid promotion, prompting backlash from the public. According to ThePrint, Maryam's administration faced criticism for alleged corruption and inefficiencies, notably with farmers protesting against the "wheat scam" and incidents of blasphemy-related violence in the province. However, according to a survey conducted by the Institute for Public Opinion Research, 55% of respondents in Punjab expressed satisfaction with the performance of the Maryam-led government. In November 2024, she ordered the distribution of 13th generation laptops to students within 90 days as part of a laptop and scholarship program. The program received 68,329 applications and aims to give laptops to 20,000 university students and 14,000 college students, with 32% from South Punjab. Maryam has given formal approval for the launch of 'Air Punjab', the province's first-ever airline project, marking a major milestone in Punjab’s transport and aviation ambitions.

In April 2025, her government established the Crime Control Department (CCD) with vision of a "safe Punjab." However, by December 2025, the department was suspected of 900 extrajudicial killings. Within weeks of the CCD's formation, increased police encounters were recorded across Punjab. Asad Jamal, a Lahore-based human rights lawyer, said that Maryam has repeatedly asserted that crime in the province has declined, which he suggested indicates that the approach was supported at the highest political level. Speaking to Al Jazeera, he expressed doubt that there would be accountability, adding that authorities appeared to justify alleged "extrajudicial killings" as a means of reducing crime rather than investing in improved investigations, better-resourced law enforcement, and stronger intelligence systems.

== Political positions ==
=== Minority rights ===
Maryam's father Nawaz Sharif ended his exile and returned to Pakistan in 2007 prior to the 2008 Pakistani general election in which her father's party, Pakistan Muslim League (N) (PML-N), emerged as one of the two largest parties. During PML-N's government in Punjab, criticisms were leveled against the party for being perceived as soft on terrorism and sectarian groups, and for its inability to improve Punjab's economy. However, Maryam was noted for advocating minority rights and opposing political alliances with banned militant outfits. Maryam expressed regret over the inability of her father's party, PML-N, and the Pakistan People's Party (PPP) to maintain their short-lived coalition following the election. However Maryam largely refrained from active involvement in politics.

=== Civil-military relations ===
In 2016, Maryam was suspected of being involved in the leak of a story to Dawn, later dubbed as "Dawn leaks", regarding a confrontation between Pakistan's civilian government and military officials during a top-secret national security meeting regarding countering militancy. After the publication of the news story, both Prime Minister Nawaz Sharif and Punjab Chief Minister Shehbaz Sharif denied the events and termed the article as fabricated. Sharif ordered action against those responsible for the publication of what he called a "fabricated" story. Later, the government held Pervez Rasheed, the Information Minister, responsible for the leak and he was subsequently made to resign from his position. After an inquiry, Maryam was identified among the 12 individuals who were found to be in contact with Cyril Almeida, the author of the news story. However, Nawaz Sharif only dismissed Fatemi and Rao Tehseen for their alleged involvement in "Dawn leaks", stating that a notification regarding this matter would be issued soon. Subsequently, the ISPR tweeted saying, "Notification on "Dawn leaks" is incomplete and not in line with recommendations by the Inquiry Board. Notification is rejected." In an apparent reference to Maryam's alleged involvement in the "Dawn leaks", then federal interior minister Chaudhry Nisar Ali Khan remarked that the government should not have formed two committees on the issue if its intention was to shield someone. He emphasized that if the government sought to conceal information, it would not have established such committees.

In 2018, she confirmed that the "Dawn leaks" news was accurate and grounded in facts and expressed regret over the Nawaz Sharif's decision to sack Pervaiz Rasheed during the 'Dawn leaks' controversy. It is believed efforts were made by Nisar Ali Khan to implicate Maryam in the "Dawn leaks" controversy, but General Bajwa refrained from mentioning her name despite Nisar Ali Khan's insistence. "Dawn leaks" inevitably altered Pakistan's political landscape leading to a confrontation between the country's civil and powerful military leadership. Some within and outside the PML-N attribute party's misfortunes directly to Maryam's rise to prominence, since the "Dawn leaks" controversy emerged.

In March 2023, Maryam called for the court martial of former DG ISI Faiz Hameed, asserting that he should be held accountable for playing an unconstitutional role. She alleged Hameed had played a part in the downfall of the Nawaz Sharif government in 2017 and supported the Imran Khan government for four years. She also claimed that Hameed confessed to his role and emphasized that it was time for institutions to take action against him. In response, Hameed stated that he held the rank of major general in 2017 and 2018, and indicated that he did not have the authority to single-handedly overthrow the entire government as the army chief has the final say in such matters.

=== Judiciary ===
She also criticized Saqib Nisar, who served as Chief Justice of Pakistan during Nawaz Sharif's ouster, accusing him of "facilitating" Imran Khan during his tenure as the country's prime minister, and called him a "liar". Following Maryam's criticism, an audio leak surfaced in which Saqib Nisar was allegedly heard using derogatory language against Maryam to which Saqib Nisar claimed that his WhatsApp had been hacked. It was noted that during the period from 2018 to 2020, then Chief Justice Saqib Nisar prioritized every case filed against Maryam and her father Nawaz Sharif.

=== Party policy ===
In 2012, when Nawaz Sharif suspended Maryam's husband, Safdar, from the PML-N due to suspicions of Safdar's involvement in planning to establish his own separate party. Maryam publicly supported her father's decision and criticized her husband's actions. The same year, she tweeted "I'm only assisting Nawaz Sharif to monitor their cyber cell. No intentions of getting into electoral or practical politics".

In February 2023, Maryam's husband, Safdar, criticized the party's decision to extend the tenure of army chief Qamar Javed Bajwa and expressed skepticism about Maryam's potential to become prime minister in the near future. In response, Maryam reportedly rebuked Safdar for deviating from the party's policy, emphasizing that no party leader, including her husband, should make statements contradicting the party's stance. She also warned of strict action against any such deviations.

== Public image ==
Maryam is regarded as heir apparent of Nawaz Sharif and the "presumed future leader" of the PML-N.

Dawn wrote she's "known for her biting rhetoric and ability to both pull and rouse a crowd" saying that she has established herself in a political arena largely dominated by men. Experts suggest that Maryam's assertive demeanor could potentially undermine the party's strength, expressing concerns that while she may attract crowds, she might not be suited to lead the party effectively.

In a 2012 interview, Maryam expressed her empathy for the children of Benazir Bhutto and recalled meeting Benazir Bhutto only once, on 14 May 2006 in London, when her father Nawaz and Benazir signed the Charter of Democracy, aimed at ending Musharraf rule in Pakistan. Describing their meeting, Maryam stated that they spoke candidly for three hours, and noted that the Sharif family was deeply saddened by Benazir's assassination in December 2007, shedding tears upon hearing the news of her assassination.

Following Dawn Leaks controversy, during an interview on Geo News program Jirga with Saleem Safi, Chaudhry Nisar Ali Khan a senior leader of PML-N and then federal interior minister criticized the comparisons drawn between former Prime Minister Benazir Bhutto and Maryam. On a number of occasions Khan dubbed Maryam as a kid, stated that he does not view Maryam as a leader and suggested that she must demonstrate her capabilities through active participation in real politics. Even those within party who didn't object to the Maryam's anti-establishment stance, were seen discontent with how Maryam had been given control of the party by her father. As a result, the division between the Shehbaz Sharif faction and the Maryam Nawaz faction within the party became evident to all, especially given the close association of both Shehbaz and Nisar Ali Khan.

In 2018, Nisar Ali Khan distanced himself from the PML-N, citing his inability to work under Maryam's command. He stated he wouldn't serve under any junior leader, particularly Maryam, and expressed concerns over the party's management. Furthermore, he warned of his intention to make the Dawn Leaks report public.

In a public opinion poll conducted by Gallup Pakistan in October 2023 regarding which leader could lead Pakistan out of the current economic crisis, 30% of respondents named Nawaz Sharif, followed by Imran Khan, who was recommended by 22% of respondents while Maryam received less than 1% of the votes. Similarly a public perception survey conducted by the Centre for Public Opinion Research in December 2023 across various districts of Lahore revealed that when asked about their preference for the next chief minister of Punjab after the forthcoming elections, 34% of respondents favored Shehbaz Sharif, while only 3% mentioned Maryam.

Shortly after her appointment as Chief Minister, Maryam visited the Punjab Safe Cities Authority headquarters. During this visit, Maryam adjusted the scarf of a female police officer that had slipped from her head. The incident sparked a debate on social media. Some individuals praised Maryam's actions, interpreting them as a display of humility and empathy, and a sign of respect towards the police officer. However, some argued that her intervention could be perceived as an intrusion into the personal space of the police officer.

== Panama Papers case ==
On 3 April 2016, the Panama Papers were leaked and Maryam was named in it along with her two brothers, Hussain Nawaz and Hassan Nawaz. According to records uncovered by the International Consortium of Investigative Journalists (ICIJ), Maryam was described as the owner of the British Virgin Islands-based firms Nielsen Enterprises Limited and Nescoll Limited, and allegedly the owner of the properties in the United Kingdom owned jointly by her brothers. In response, Maryam denied owning any company or property outside Pakistan and said, "My brother has made me a trustee in one of his corporations which only entitles me to distribute assets to my brother Hussain's family/children if needed".

In September 2016, the Pakistan Tehreek-e-Insaf (PTI) filed a petition in the Supreme Court of Pakistan asking for action against Prime Minister Nawaz Sharif and his relatives for their alleged involvement in the Panama Papers scandal. In January 2017, Maryam submitted her statement to the Supreme Court saying she has not been dependent on her father since her marriage in 1992. On 16 February 2017, Maryam's lawyer admitted before the Supreme Court that Maryam owned four flats in London for at least six months in 2006. On 20 April, the Supreme Court announced a split verdict and ordered the formation of the joint investigation team (JIT) to investigate the Sharif family's assets for irregularities. On 10 July, the JIT submitted its report to the Supreme Court in which it maintained that the Sharif family has assets beyond known sources of income. In its report, the JIT noted that Maryam misled the Supreme Court by presenting fake documents and stated that the Calibri font used on the declaration dated 2006 produced by Maryam was not commercially available before 31 January 2007. The scandal was widely referred to as Fontgate.

The Supreme Court announced its decision on 28 July 2017 and disqualified Nawaz Sharif from holding public office as he had been dishonest in not disclosing his employment in the Dubai-based Capital FZE company in his nomination papers. The court also ordered the National Accountability Bureau (NAB) to file a reference against Sharif and his relatives against corruption charges.

In September 2017, the NAB filed three corruption references against Nawaz Sharif and his three children including Maryam in compliance with the Supreme Court verdict in the Panama Papers case. In October, an accountability court indicted Maryam, Nawaz Sharif, and Maryam's husband in the Avenfield reference—one of three corruption references filed by the NAB—which pertains to the ownership of the Sharif family's four flats at Avenfield, an apartment on Park Lane in London. After conducting 107 hearings of the Avenfield case since September 2017, the accountability court reserved its verdict in the case on 3 July 2018.

On 6 July 2018, she was sentenced to seven years in jail and a fine of two million pounds by the NAB on corruption charges in the Avenfield reference case. She was given seven years for abetment and one year for non-cooperation with the NAB. Both sentences will run concurrently. As a result, she was disqualified from contesting in elections for 10 years. The court held that the trust deeds presented by Maryam before the apex court were fake and had been tampered with. Her father, Nawaz Sharif, and her husband were also sentenced to ten years and one year in prison, respectively. The court also ordered the seizure of the Avenfield flats of the Sharif family.

The next day, Maryam announced that she would return to Pakistan on 13 July to file an appeal against the decision. The same day, the NAB announced their intention to arrest her and Nawaz Sharif upon their arrival in Pakistan and obtained the required arrest warrant. She, along with Nawaz Sharif, was taken into custody by the NAB on 13 July upon their arrival at Lahore's Allama Iqbal International Airport and were airlifted to Rawalpindi's Adiala jail. On 26 July, she challenged her sentence in the Islamabad High Court and filed a petition for bail. The next day, the Islamabad High Court rejected her request for release on bail and adjourned the hearing until the end of the 2018 Pakistani general election. During her time in detention, she spent significant amounts of time reading books.

On 21 August 2018, the government of Prime Minister Imran Khan placed her on the Exit Control List in order to prevent her from leaving Pakistan. On 11 September, her mother, Kulsoom Nawaz, died in London. Maryam along with her father and husband were released from Adiala jail on parole. They were flown to Lahore to attend her mother's funeral. Reportedly, Maryam and her father initially refused to be released on parole. The funeral of Kulsoom Nawaz was held on 14 September 2018. On 17 September, Maryam, together with her father and husband, was moved to Adiala jail.

On 19 September 2018, the Islamabad High Court announced its verdict on the bail petition and suspended the prison sentences against Maryam, her father, and her husband, and ordered their release on bail. The court ordered them to pay Rs 500,000 each as surety bonds before their release. They were released from Adiala jail the same day and were flown to Lahore.

=== Acquittal in corruption case ===
For assisting and aiding her father in the purchase of London flats that were acquired via dishonest means, Maryam had been given a seven-year prison sentence in July 2018. Safdar had also received a one-year sentence. Despite receiving a 10-year prison term for himself, Nawaz Sharif was granted bail in 2019 so he could travel to the United Kingdom for medical care.

Soon after Maryam's uncle Shehbaz Sharif came into power in 2022 as Prime Minister after a vote of no confidence against Imran Khan, changes were made to the senior leadership of the National Accountability Bureau, and under questionable circumstances, a corruption conviction against Maryam and her husband was overturned by an Islamabad High Court on 29 September 2022 with no additional information being given. This was around the same time several corruption cases against the Sharif family were closed, including those on Shehbaz Sharif's son Hamza Shehbaz and Shehbaz Sharif himself.

== Wealth ==
In 2011 on a TV show with Pakistani anchor Sana Bucha, Maryam said she owned no properties in central London let alone in Pakistan. It was later revealed in 2017 by a Joint Investigation Team that "she was the beneficiary of the London flats and she purposely never declared the ownership of these overseas properties, submitted fake documents, and misled the Supreme Court of Pakistan". Her conviction was overturned on 29 September 2022 related to the purchase of apartments in London. The two-judge panel of the Islamabad High Court dismissed prosecution's case against her.

In 2018 in her affidavit to the Election Commission of Pakistan, Maryam declared her assets to be worth Rs. 845 million (US$3.0 million). She owns 1,506 Kanals (188 acres) of agricultural land and has invested millions into companies.

== Awards and recognition ==
In March 2017, Maryam was included in the BBC's 100 Women list, recognizing influential women worldwide, notably as the first daughter in her country. In December 2017, she was featured on The New York Times list of 11 Powerful Women Around the World for the year 2017, where it was mentioned, that "corruption charges are clouding her rapid rise".

== Controversies ==
Over the years, several audio recordings involving Maryam Nawaz have surfaced. In 2021, an audio clip was released that included a phone conversation between Maryam and then Information Minister Pervaiz Rasheed. In the conversation, Maryam seemed to be directing the refusal of advertisements to certain TV channels. Maryam later verified the authenticity of the audio clip and defended her actions, explaining that she was referring to PML-N advertisements.

In September 2022, another audio recording was leaked in which her uncle, Prime Minister Shehbaz Sharif, was heard speaking to an unidentified individual. The man informed Shehbaz that Maryam was requesting the import of a power plant from India for her son-in-law’s business. Shehbaz Sharif then discussed the potential problems of importing a plant from India, as it could be used against his government by former Prime Minister Imran Khan.

In October 2022, while quoting a tweet which mocked assassinated Pakistani journalist Arshad Sharif's dead body, Maryam wrote: "I don't feel good RTing this but this is a lesson for the mankind that we must all imbibe". She apologised after immense criticism and widespread condementation from politicians, journalists, activists and social media users. Nearly a month later, Tasneem Haider, a spokesperson of Nawaz Sharif's party in London, alleged that his party's top leadership had prepared the assassination plots of Arshad Sharif and former Prime Minister Imran Khan.

In March 2023, an audio recording allegedly featuring Maryam Nawaz was leaked. In the recording, she appeared to be advising her uncle, Prime Minister Shahbaz Sharif, to depict the death of Pakistan Tehreek-e-Insaf worker Zilleh Shah as a car accident caused by his party colleagues. In March 2024, After assuming the role of Chief Minister of Punjab, Maryam lodged a complaint with the Federal Investigation Agency (FIA) against PTI leader Shandana Gulzar. This was in response to allegations of false propaganda made by Gulzar regarding the controversy surrounding the death of Zilley Shah. Subsequently, the FIA's Cyber Crime Circle in Lahore summoned Shandana for questioning.

In May 2023, Bushra Bibi, the former first lady, initiated legal action against Maryam for defamation. This came after Maryam accused Bushra Bibi of accepting bribes in exchange for signing official documents during the tenure of the Imran Khan-led government.

In March 2024, PTI leader Sher Afzal Marwat alleged that there were plans to assassinate him, claiming that assassins had been hired. He asserted that Maryam Nawaz had orchestrated the plot through an Indian citizen named Jindal, initially meeting in South Africa and Dubai. According to Marwat, evidence suggested that he was the target of the assassination, and he implicated Maryam Nawaz as the mastermind behind the scheme. Marwat stated that the evidence would be shared with the FIA for investigation.

In October 2024, following reports of an alleged rape of a college student in Lahore, Maryam Nawaz held a press conference to address the allegations, referring to them as "rumours spread on social media" and describing the incident as a "fabricated story." She further stated that an issue was made out of an incident that "never existed in the first place." Maryam added, This girl is completely paak saaf (chaste), there are false allegations being levelled against her, and stated that if a rape had occurred, she would have acted promptly. Subsequently, she faced criticism from Aurat March, who called on her to either apologize or resign from her position as Chief Minister. They condemned Maryam's statements, describing them as "vile and regressive language" and argued that she was "unfit to represent the public while disregarding the safety, rights, and dignity of survivors of sexual violence."

== Notes ==
Preceded by Mohsin Raza Naqvi; Caretaker	Chief Minister of Punjab; 28 February 2024 – present	Incumbent
