= NA-71 Sialkot-II =

Constituency of the National Assembly of Pakistan

- Constituency for the National Assembly of Pakistan
- Region: Sialkot City and Cantonment area of Sialkot District
- Electorate: 488,393

Current constituency
- Party: Pakistan Muslim League (N)
- Member: Khawaja Asif
- Created from: NA-110 Sialkot-I

NA-71 Sialkot-II (این اے-71، سيالکوٹ-2) is a constituency for the National Assembly of Pakistan.

== Members of Parliament ==
=== 1977–1985: NA-104 Sialkot-I ===
Election	Member	Party
1977	Qazi Zaka Ud Din	PPP
1985	Khawaja Muhammad Safdar	Independent

=== 1988–2002: NA-85 Sialkot-I ===
Election	Member	Party
1988	Mian Muhammad Shafi	IJI
1990	Mian Muhammad Shafi	IJI
1993	Khawaja Asif	PML-N
1997	Khawaja Asif	PML-N

=== 2002–2018: NA-110 Sialkot-I ===
Election	Member	Party
2002	Khawaja Asif	PML-N
2008	Khawaja Asif	PML-N
2013	Khawaja Asif	PML-N

=== 2018–2023: NA-73 Sialkot-II ===
Election	Member	Party
2018	Khawaja Asif	PML (N)

=== 2024–present: NA-71 Sialkot-II ===
Election	Member	Party
2024	Khawaja Asif	PML (N)

== Election 2002 ==
General elections were held on 10 October 2002. Khawaja Muhammad Asif of PML-N won by 42,743 votes.

General election 2002: NA-110 Sialkot-I
Party	Candidate	Votes	%	±%
PML(N)	Khawaja Asif	42,743	41.99	
PML(Q)	Mian Muhammad Riaz	38,957	38.27	
PPP	Raja Amer Khan	19,391	19.05	
Others	Others (two candidates)	712	0.69	.
Turnout		106,083	42.86	
Total valid votes		101,803	95.97	
Rejected ballots		4,280	4.03	
Majority		3,786	3.72	
Registered electors		247,536		

== Election 2008 ==
General elections were held on 18 February 2008. Khawaja Muhammad Asif of PML-N won by 73,007 votes.

General election 2008: NA-110 Sialkot-I
Party	Candidate	Votes	%	±%
PML(N)	Khawaja Asif	73,007	63.58	
PPP	Zahid Pervaiz Alias Zahid Bashir	32,157	28.01	
PML(Q)	Mian Muhammad Riaz	9,498	8.27	
MQM	Muhammad Sagheer Ch.	163	0.14	
Turnout		118,120	42.80	
Total valid votes		114,825	97.21	
Rejected ballots		3,295	2.79	
Majority		40,850	35.57	
Registered electors		275,969		
PML(N) hold				

== Election 2013 ==
General elections were held on 11 May 2013. Khawaja Muhammad Asif of PML-N won by 92,848 votes and became the member of National Assembly. On 26 April 2018, he was disqualified from holding a public office for life by the Islamabad High Court over possession of the UAE work permit but on his appeal Supreme Court of Pakistan qualified him for next elections in 2018.

General election 2013: NA-110 Sialkot-I
Party	Candidate	Votes	%	±%
PML(N)	Khawaja Asif	92,848	52.67	
PTI	Usman Dar	71,573	40.60	
Others	Others (eight candidates)	11,873	6.78	
Turnout		179,584	52.49	
Total valid votes		176,294	98.17	
Rejected ballots		3,290	1.83	
Majority		21,275	12.07	
Registered electors		342,125		
PML(N) hold				

== Election 2018 ==
General elections were held on 25 July 2018.

General election 2018: NA-73 Sialkot-II
Party	Candidate	Votes	%	±%
PML(N)	Khawaja Asif	117,002	47.42	
PTI	Usman Dar	115,596	46.85	
TLP	Rana Muhammad Naeem Javid	9,958	4.04	
Others	Others (seven candidates)	4,165	1.69	
Turnout		253,700	51.95	
Total valid votes		246,721	97.25	
Rejected ballots		6,979	2.75	
Majority		1,406	0.57	
Registered electors		488,393		
PML(N) hold		Swing	N/A	

== Election 2024 ==
General elections were held on 8 February 2024. Khawaja Asif won the election with 119,017 votes.

General election 2024: NA-71 Sialkot-II
Party	Candidate	Votes	%	±%
PML(N)	Khawaja Asif	119,017	48.47	▲2.41
PTI	Rehana Imtiaz Dar (Note: Filed nomination papers as PTI candidate but ECP allowed her to run as an Independent)	100,563	40.95	▼4.52
TLP	Muhammad Aslam	11,529	4.70	▲0.66
Others	Others (fifteen candidates)	14,447	5.88	
Turnout		252,190	43.69	▼8.30
Total valid votes		245,556	97.37	
Rejected ballots		6,634	2.63	
Majority		18,454	7.52	▲6.93
Registered electors		577,281		
PML(N) hold		Swing	N/A	

== See also ==
- NA-70 Sialkot-I
- NA-72 Sialkot-III
