= Dawn leaks =

2017 controversy in Pakistan

Dawn leaks (Urdu: ڈان لیک) refers to a 2017 controversy in Pakistan sparked by a news report in the Dawn.

== Background ==
In 2016, Cyril Almeida, while working for Dawn as a journalist, reported that during the high profile National Security Council (NSC) meeting between the civilian leaders under the leadership of then Prime Minister Nawaz Sharif and the military leaders of Pakistan, some civilian leaders highlighted the diplomatic challenges facing Pakistan. Aizaz Chaudhry presented a briefing indicating that major world powers were indifferent to Pakistan's position, and relations with the United States were deteriorating over demands to act against the Haqqani Network. He also noted that while China remained supportive, it preferred a change in Pakistan's approach to dealing with militant groups.

Two key decisions emerged from the meeting. First, Inter-Services Intelligence (ISI) Director General Rizwan Akhtar, accompanied by National Security Adviser Nasir Khan Janjua, was tasked with visiting all four provinces and ISI sector commanders to instruct that military-led intelligence agencies should not interfere with law enforcement actions against banned militant groups. Second, the government planned to expedite the investigation into the Pathankot airbase attack and restart the stalled trial related to the 2008 Mumbai attacks in a Rawalpindi anti-terrorism court.

The meeting witnessed a notable exchange between then-Chief Minister of Punjab, Shehbaz Sharif and Rizwan Akhtar. Shehbaz Sharif accused the security establishment of undermining civilian efforts by facilitating the release of arrested individuals linked to certain militant groups. In response, Akhtar asserted the military's policy of not distinguishing between different militant organizations and expressed readiness to support government actions.

== Investigation ==
Maryam Nawaz was suspected of being involved in the leak of a story to Dawn. After the publication of the news story, both Prime Minister Nawaz Sharif and Punjab Chief Minister Shehbaz Sharif denied the events and termed the article as fabricated. Sharif ordered action against those responsible for the publication of what he called a "fabricated" story.

== Aftermath ==
Pakistan's military establishment was clearly upset over reports of alleged leaking of this classified information to a Pakistani journalist by some civilian leaders attending that NSC meeting.

After the completion of investigation, the government held Pervez Rasheed, the Information Minister, responsible for the leak and he was subsequently made to resign from his position. After an inquiry, 12 individuals were found to be in contact with Cyril Almeida. However, Nawaz Sharif only dismissed Fatemi and Rao Tehseen for their alleged involvement in 'Dawn leaks,' stating that a notification regarding this matter would be issued soon. Subsequently, the ISPR tweeted saying, "Notification on Dawn Leak is incomplete and not in line with recommendations by the Inquiry Board. Notification is rejected." In 2018, Maryam confirmed that the Dawn leaks news was accurate and grounded in facts and expressed regret over the Nawaz Sharif's decision to sack Pervaiz Rasheed during the 'Dawn Leaks' controversy.

Some within and outside the PML-N attribute party's misfortunes, since the Dawn Leaks controversy emerged, directly to Maryam's rise to prominence.
