= Khawaja Asif =

Defence Minister of Pakistan since 2022

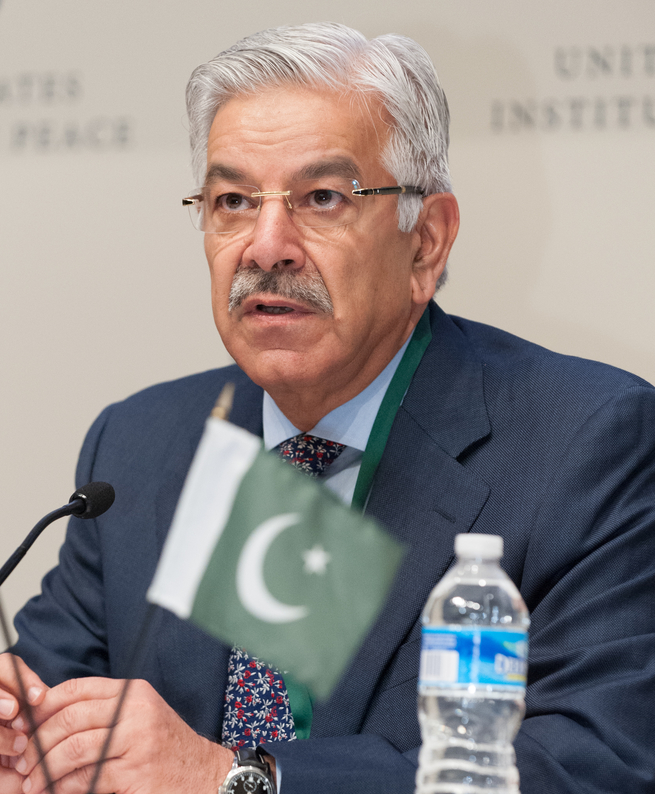
- Asif in 2015

Minister of Defence
- Incumbent
- Assumed office 19 April 2022
- President: Arif Alvi; Asif Ali Zardari
- Prime Minister: Shehbaz Sharif
- Preceded by: Pervez Khattak
- Succeeded by: Anwar Ali Hyder (caretaker)
- In office 27 November 2013 – 28 July 2017
- President: Mamnoon Hussain
- Prime Minister: Nawaz Sharif
- Preceded by: Naveed Qamar
- Succeeded by: Khurram Dastgir

33rd Minister of Foreign Affairs
- In office 4 August 2017 – 26 April 2018
- President: Mamnoon Hussain
- Prime Minister: Shahid Khaqan Abbasi
- Preceded by: Sartaj Aziz(as Adviser to the Prime Minister on Foreign Affairs)
- Succeeded by: Khurram Dastgir Khan

Minister of Water and Power
- In office 7 June 2013 – 28 July 2017
- President: Mamnoon Hussain
- Prime Minister: Nawaz Sharif
- Deputy: Abid Sher Ali
- Preceded by: Ahmad Mukhtar
- Succeeded by: Syed Javed Ali Shah (as Minister of Water Resources); Shahid Khaqan Abbasi (as Minister of Energy)

Minister of Petroleum and Natural Resources
- In office 31 March 2008 – 13 May 2008
- President: Pervez Musharraf
- Prime Minister: Yusuf Raza Gillani
- Succeeded by: Asim Hussain

Minister of Sports
- In office 31 March 2008 – 13 May 2008
- President: Pervez Musharraf
- Prime Minister: Yusuf Raza Gillani

Member of PML(N)
- Incumbent
- Assumed office 4 May 2019
- Deputy: Abid Sher Ali
- Preceded by: Position Established

Member of National Assembly of Pakistan
- Incumbent
- Assumed office 29 February 2024
- Constituency: NA-71 Sialkot-II
- Majority: 18,454 (7.52%)
- In office 13 August 2018 – 10 August 2023
- Constituency: NA-73 Sialkot-II
- Majority: 1,406 (0.57%)
- In office 18 November 2002 – 26 April 2018
- Constituency: NA-110 Sialkot-I
- Majority: 3,786 (3.72%)
- In office 15 October 1993 – 12 October 1999
- Preceded by: Mian Muhammad Shafi
- Constituency: NA-85 Sialkot-I

Personal details
- Born: 9 August 1949 (age 77) Sialkot, West Punjab, Pakistan
- Party: PML(N) (1993–present)
- Spouse: Musarrat Asif Khawaja
- Relations: Farooq Naek (cousin)
- Parent: Khawaja Muhammad Safdar (father)
- Education: University of the Punjab
- Awards: Nishan-e-Imtiaz

Khawaja Muhammad Asif (Note: Urdu: خواجہ محمد آصف) (born 9 August 1949) is a Pakistani politician who has served as the Defence Minister of Pakistan since 2022, having previously served in the post from 2013 to 2017. He has been a Member of the National Assembly (MNA) from Sialkot since 1993, he is one of the senior parliamentarians from his region, having secured seven consecutive terms in the National Assembly.

He also has an additional portfolio of Minister of Aviation since 11 March 2024, and was the Minister for Foreign Affairs in the Abbasi cabinet from August 2017 to April 2018 and simultaneously served as the Minister for Defence and Minister for Water and Power under Nawaz Sharif's third term from 2013 to 2017. Asif began his political career after getting elected to the Senate of Pakistan during the Nawaz Sharif's first term in 1991. Since 1997, he had served as a member of the federal cabinet, in various positions. From 1997 to 1999, he was as the chairman of the Privatization Commission of Pakistan during the second government of Nawaz Sharif. He briefly held the cabinet portfolios of the Minister for Petroleum and Natural Resources in the Gillani ministry in 2008, with an additional charge as Minister for Sports.

== Early life and education ==
Asif was born on 9 August 1949 in Sialkot, Punjab, to Khawaja Muhammad Safdar, an influential politician. He belongs to a Kashmiri family whose ancestors settled in the Punjab generations ago from the Kashmir Valley. He received his early education at Cadet College Hasan Abdal. He attained his bachelor's degree from Government College University, Lahore, before getting his L.L.B. degree from the University Law College, Lahore, in 1970. He later earned a master’s degree in economics from the London School of Economics in 1975.

Asif is a banker by profession and has worked in the different banks of the United Arab Emirates, including in the Abu Dhabi branch of the controversial and now-defunct Bank of Credit and Commerce International (BCCI). He lived in the UAE for several years but returned to Pakistan following his father's death in 1991, in order to continue his father's politics. He has a son and three daughters.

In 2017, he was awarded honorary doctorate degree in international relations by the Geneva School of Diplomacy and International Relations.

In 2019, he was featured in a list of "top handsome lawmakers of Pakistan."

== Political career ==
=== Early political career and senate tenure ===
Asif began his political career in 1991 on returning to Pakistan following the death of his father after living in the United Arab Emirates for many years. In 1991, he was elected to the Senate of Pakistan as a candidate of Pakistan Muslim League (N) (PML-N) for three years.

=== National Assembly elections ===
He was elected to the National Assembly of Pakistan from Constituency NA-110 (Sialkot) in the 1993 general election.

He was re-elected to the National Assembly in the 1997 general election Khawaja Asif contested the 2002 general election elections from NA 110 and won his seats by taking 42,743 votes.

Asif contested the 2008 general election from NA 110 and obtained 73,007 votes.

In the 2013 Pakistani general election, Asif was re-elected as a member of the National Assembly from NA 110 taking 92,848 votes against his opponent Usman Dar who obtained 71,573 votes.

He was re-elected to the National Assembly as a candidate of PML-N from Constituency NA-73 (Sialkot-II) in the 2018 Pakistani general election. He received 116,957 votes and defeated Usman Dar who received 115,464 votes. He supports a financially independent Pakistan. In May 2019 he took the charge and became the Parliamentary Leader of PMLN in the National Assembly of Pakistan.

He was re-elected to the National Assembly of Pakistan as a candidate of PML-N from constituency NA-71 Sialkot-II in the 2024 Pakistani general election, he received 119,001 and defeated Independent Candidate Rehana Imtiaz Dar, who is mother of Asif's former election rival Usman Dar, She received 100,482 votes.

== Ministerial career ==
=== Role in the Second Nawaz Sharif government (1997) ===
He was appointed as the chairman of the Privatization Commission of Pakistan with the status of a minister during Nawaz Sharif's second term in 1997. His tenure was terminated following the counter-coup 1999 coup d'état in which then Chief of Army Staff, Pervez Musharraf, overthrew Prime Minister Nawaz Sharif in response to Sharif indirectly hijacking Musharraf's plane and ordering it to land outside Pakistan.

=== Role in the coalition government (2008) ===
He was briefly appointed as the Minister of Petroleum and Natural Resources, as well as the Minister of Sports in the Gillani ministry in 2008 before his party pulled out of the Pakistan Peoples Party-led coalition government.

=== Role in the Third Nawaz Sharif government (2013) ===
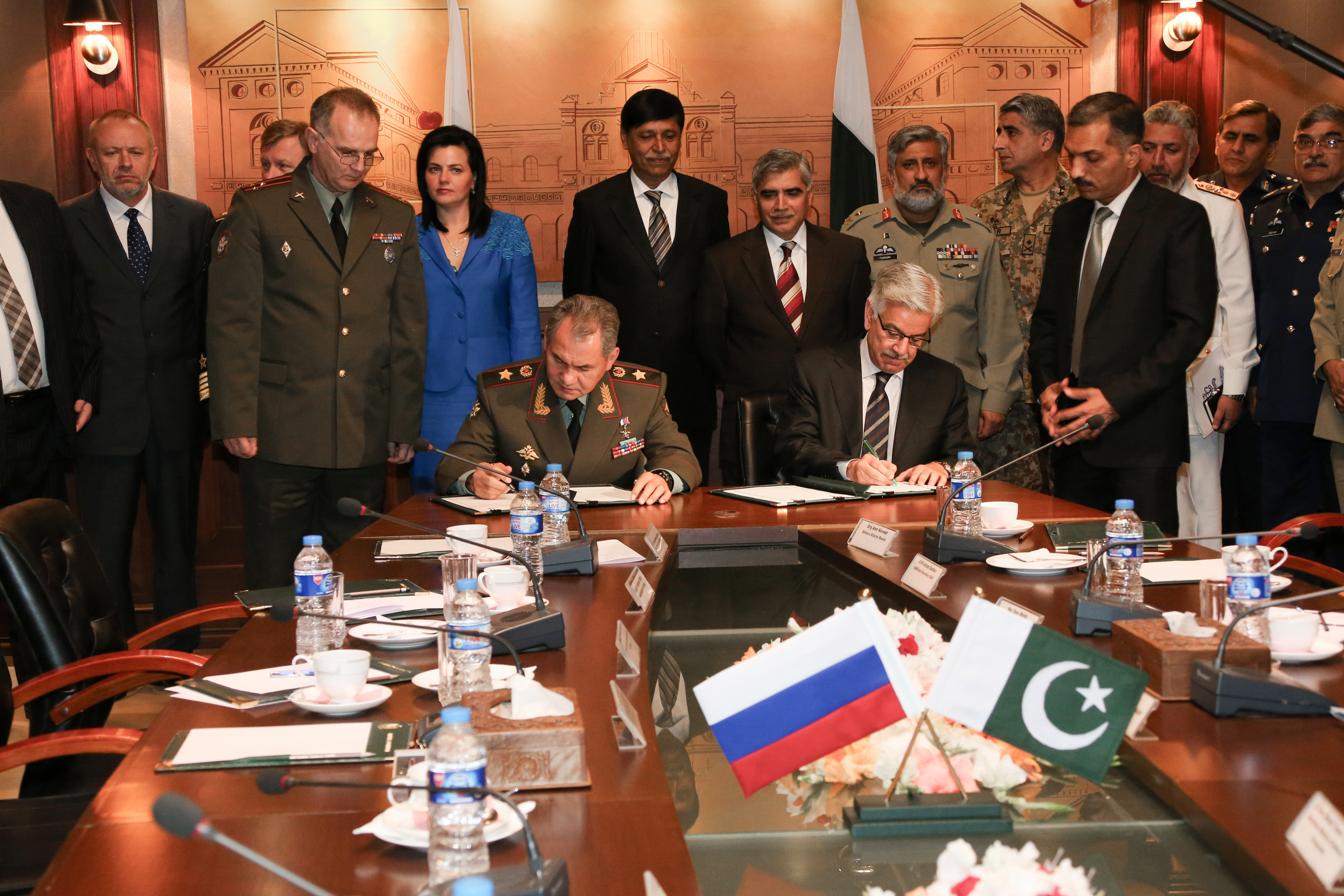
Asif with Russian Defense Minister Sergei Shoigu, 20 November 2014

In June 2013, he was appointed as the Minister of Water and Power and later given additional portfolio of Minister of Defence in November 2013 under Third Nawaz Sharif government.

=== Role in the Abbasi government (2017) ===
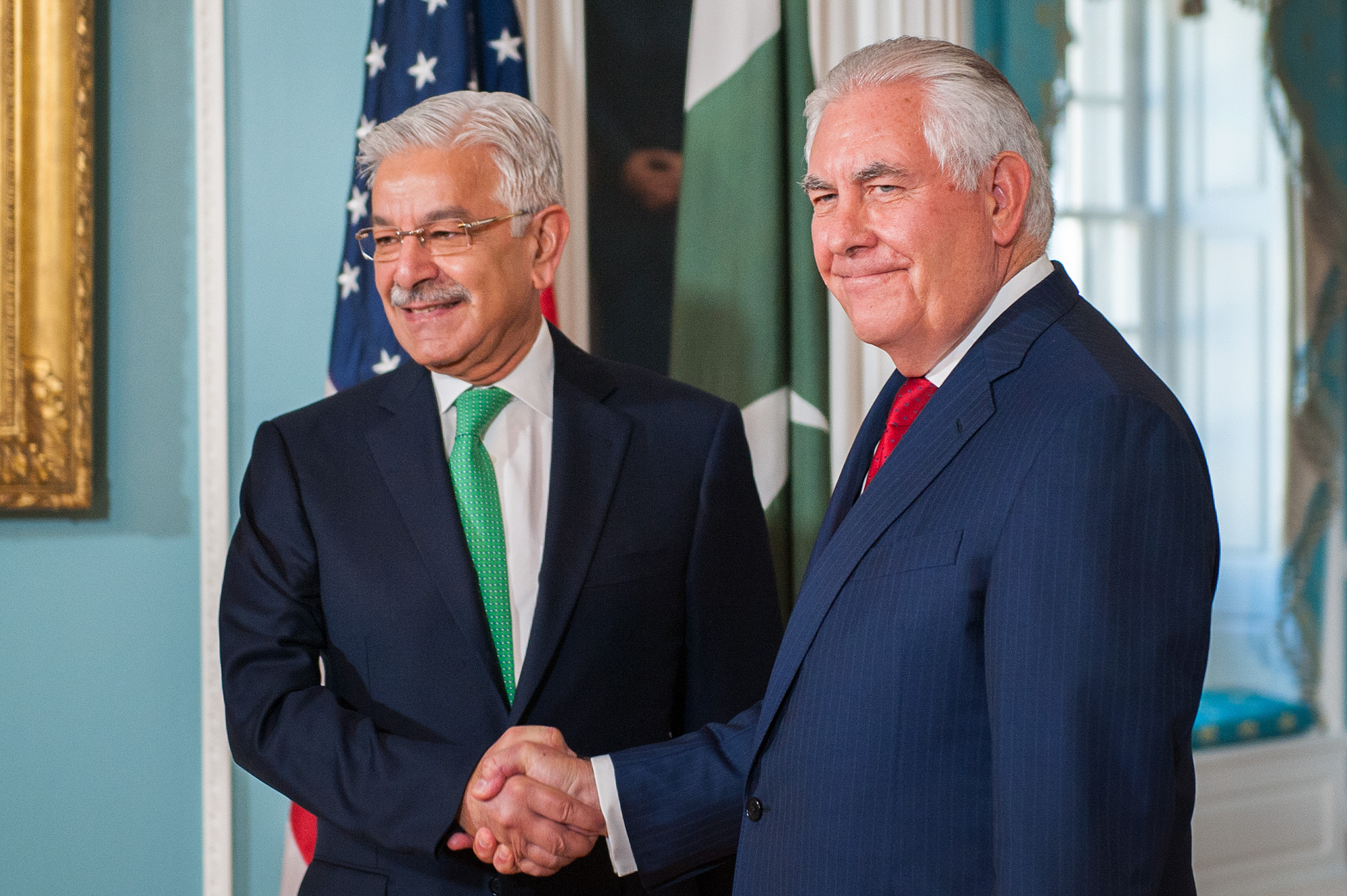
Asif with US Secretary of State Rex Tillerson, 4 October 2017

He had ceased to hold ministerial office in July 2017 when the federal cabinet was disbanded following the resignation of Prime Minister Nawaz Sharif after Panama Papers case decision. Following the election of Shahid Khaqan Abbasi as Prime Minister of Pakistan, Asif was inducted into the federal cabinet of Abbasi and was appointed Minister for Foreign Affairs for the first time. Earlier, Pakistan had no Minister for Foreign Affairs since the PML-N came to power in May 2013 as former Prime Minister Nawaz Sharif himself held the cabinet portfolio of foreign affairs.

In January 2018, following the US suspension of security assistance to Pakistan, Asif stated, "You (US) carried out 57,800 attacks on Afghanistan from our bases, your forces were supplied arms and explosives through our soil, thousands of our civilians and soldiers became victims of the war initiated by you."

=== Role in the First and Second Shahbaz Sharif government (2022 and 2024) ===
He was appointed as the country's Defence Minister during the Shehbaz Sharif 's first term in 2022 and retained the position in the Second Shehbaz government formed in 2024.

In September 2025, Khawaja Asif initially implied that the Pakistan-Saudi Arabia Strategic Mutual Defense Agreement had a nuclear dimension. In an interview with Geo News, he stated, “No one should doubt what we have and what the capabilities are that will be available to them under this pact,” a remark widely interpreted as suggesting nuclear coverage, though he later told Reuters that nuclear arms were “not on the radar” of the agreement. The lack of clarity fuelled speculation and the scope of the agreement reportedly remained ambiguous.

==== 2025 India-Pakistan conflict ====
On 24 April 2025, amid tensions between India and Pakistan following the Pahalgam attack, Khawaja Asif, in an interview with Sky News journalist Yalda Hakim, said it could lead to an "all-out-war". Asif also said Pakistan has been doing the "dirty work" of the western nations when asked about supporting and financing terrorism. He had also claimed that Lashkar-e-Taiba was extinct in Pakistan. A forensic analysis done in the aftermath of Indian airstrikes on a Muridke site showed LeT had posted recent videos at Markaz-e-Taiba.

On 6 May 2025, Asif claimed that some Indian soldiers had been taken prisoner during the 2025 India-Pakistan conflict in an interview to Bloomberg TV. His statements were reportedly fact-checked and he retracted his statements later. He later told Samaa TV that no Indian soldiers were captured.

On 8 May 2025, in the context of the India–Pakistan standoff, addressing the National Assembly, Asif stated that the country’s military intentionally chose not to intercept Indian drones during recent cross-border strikes. He explained that the drone incursion was aimed at identifying Pakistani military positions, and intercepting them could have exposed those sensitive locations. Asif described the matter as 'technical' and implied that avoiding engagement was a strategic decision to prevent revealing the army's operational sites.

Amid ongoing military engagements, in an interview with CNN’s Becky Anderson, he was asked for evidence of downing five Indian jets, to which he responded that "[i]t’s all over the (sic) social media. Indian social media, not on our social media."

On 9 May 2025, during a parliamentary address, Asif said that madrassa students were the country’s "second line of defense," and that they could be used for civil defence or other needs.

In June 2025, Asif claimed in Parliament that Pakistani cyber operatives were responsible for a series of cyberattacks, including disrupting the Indian Premier League (IPL), shutting down stadium floodlights, and manipulating dam operations. He stated, “The IPL was stopped and the lights of the stadium were turned off, waters in the dams were released, all these cyber attacks were done by our children.” Asif alleged that a blackout during the 8 May IPL match between Punjab Kings and Delhi Capitals in Dharamshala was the result of a Pakistani cyber operation. However, the Board of Control for Cricket in India (BCCI) later stated that the disruption was due to a technical power failure and not linked to any external interference.

On 5 June 2025, Asif declared the Simla Agreement a 'dead document'. He was quoted stating that, "whether the Indus Waters Treaty is suspended or not, Simla is already over."

==== 2025 Afghanistan-Pakistan conflict ====
In October, after the brief clashes during the 2025 Afghanistan-Pakistan conflict, while commenting on the peace talks with Afghanistan, Asif stated that if no agreement was reached, there'd be an open war. "We have the option, if no agreement takes place, we have an open war with them," he said in televised remarks. Upon failure of peace talks held in Istanbul, Asif threatened to "obliterate" the ruling Taliban government. In response to Afghan warnings that they would "attack Islamabad" should hostilities escalate, Asif stated, "If Afghanistan even looks at Islamabad, we will gouge their eyes out." He also claimed that the Afghan government had no independent authority to hold talks and did not have full control over Afghanistan. He reportedly urged legal action against former Pakistani leaders who, according to him, "supported the Taliban in the past."

In November, ahead of third round of talks, he reiterated that there'd be escalation and possibly war if peace talks failed. After the failure of talks and a bombing incident in Islamabad, he declared a "state of war" and the negotiations hopeless while blaming Kabul for the incident, a charge Afghanistan denied.

==== 2026 Iran and Lebanon war ====
In April, after a Pakistan-mediated deal brought a ceasefire to the 2026 Iran war, Asif commemorated the deal, asserting that this "moment of pride and respect is unprecedented in our 78-year history". The minister expressed hope for the success of negotiations, stating in regards to Persian Gulf countries that "as brothers on both sides of the Gulf, we are playing a role in promoting peace". However, Asif warned against the growing influence of Israel, stating that “the Israeli influence has spread across Europe, the United States, and the Arab world, and Pakistan now has a significant opportunity to take on a leadership role in opposing it". Furthermore, he called the Muslim world to recognise that its "true and eternal enemy" was India in South Asia and Israel in the Gulf.

After the April 2026 Lebanon attacks, Asif tweeted that "Israel is evil and a curse for humanity" stating that "while peace talks are underway in Islamabad, genocide is being committed in Lebanon", sparking condemnation from Israeli PM's office: "This is not a statement that can be tolerated from any government, especially not from one that claims to be a neutral arbiter for peace," the official Israeli statement read. Pakistan insisted that Lebanon was part of terms of truce while Israel and US denied it. According to reports the tweet that was later deleted.

== Views ==
=== Civil-military relations ===
Khawaja Asif has publicly endorsed what he describes as a "hybrid model" of governance in which the military holds significant influence over the civilian government and state affairs through an informal power-sharing arrangement—a structure he characterises as a pragmatic response to Pakistan’s economic and administrative challenges. In a 2025 interview with Arab News, Asif acknowledged the military's elevated stature following the country’s recent military confrontation with India and praised the model for fostering improved coordination and national stability. He asserted that the arrangement, though not an "ideal democratic government," has proven effective, particularly through joint platforms like the Special Investment Facilitation Council (SIFC), where civil and military leaders collaboratively shape policy. Asif emphasised that this model ensures "co-ownership" of power without undermining civilian authority, maintaining that decisions under Prime Minister Shehbaz Sharif are made through consensus with the military establishment. He suggested that, had such a model been adopted in earlier decades, Pakistan’s democratic development would have progressed more smoothly. He additionally claimed that “the only realistic option” for the Pakistan Muslim League (N) and the Sharif brothers is "to compromise with the military."

=== Afghan refugees ===
Asif has expressed strong criticism of Afghan refugees in Pakistan, alleging that some have provided shelter to terrorists and contributed to ongoing security challenges. He argued that Pakistan suffered the consequences of decades of hosting millions of Afghan nationals for over six decades, claiming the country was now "paying in blood" for its hospitality. In 2025, Asif urged repatriation of Afghan refugees, arguing that the era of what he called "gratuitous and benevolent killing" must end. In 2026, Asif claimed that 70 to 80 percent of those carrying out attacks and targeting Pakistani troops were Afghans. He was also critical of Pakistani students supporting presence of Afghan students in Pakistan and blamed their political leanings for it.

=== Anti-Zionism ===
In the context of the 2026 Iran war, Asif stated that Zionism posed a threat to humanity and alleged that many conflicts imposed on the Muslim world since the establishment of Israel in Palestine had been linked to Zionist influence. He claimed that Zionist actors had dominated the global economic system for over a century and argued that Israel’s policies were responsible for instability and wars in the Middle East.

Later, in the context of the 2026 Lebanon war, Asif posted on social media following Israel’s launch of Operation Eternal Darkness, which he described as a violation of ongoing ceasefire efforts while peace talks were underway in Islamabad. In his post, he referred to Israel as "evil" and a "curse for humanity", and alleged that genocide was being committed in Lebanon. He further claimed that innocent civilians were being killed by Israel, stating that violence had extended from Gaza to Iran and then to Lebanon. His remarks also included highly inflammatory language regarding the historical establishment of Israel. These statements were made amid ongoing diplomatic efforts involving officials from the United States and Iran, including US Vice-President JD Vance and Iranian Foreign Minister Abbas Araghchi, who were reportedly scheduled to participate in talks in Islamabad on April 10. Asif’s comments were strongly condemned by Israeli officials.

== Controversies ==
=== Arrest by NAB and corruption allegations (2002) ===
The National Accountability Bureau (NAB) took Asif into its custody on corruption charges after the military takeover but later, he was released.

=== Dual nationality controversy (2012) ===
In June 2012, a petition admitted by the Supreme Court of Pakistan's registrar stated that Asif holds dual nationality, and hence, according to Pakistan's constitution, he is not eligible to hold public office in Pakistan. Following this, the Federal Investigations Agency and the Supreme Court began an investigation pursuing inquiries of Asif's dual nationality charges. The court did not find him guilty of the charges petitioned against him; the petitioner who levelled the charges withdrew the accusations and issued a formal apology.

=== Work permit controversy in 2018 elections ===
On 26 April 2018, he was disqualified from holding a public office for life by the Islamabad High Court over possessing a UAE work permit. He was unseated by the Election Commission of Pakistan as Member of the National Assembly. Following this Asif challenged his disqualification in the Supreme Court. In June 2018, the Supreme Court suspended the lifetime disqualification and declared the decision of Islamabad High Court null and void, and allowed Asif to contest elections.

=== Asset beyond means case (2020) ===
He was arrested on 29 December 2020 by National Accountability Bureau (NAB) in assets beyond means case. He was released on bail by Lahore High Court on 23 June 2021 in the assets beyond means case.

=== Sexist statement in Parliament and widespread backlash (2023) ===
In July 2023 his labelling of female opposition leaders in the Pakistan Tehreek-e-Insaaf (PTI) party as "trash and leftovers" led to a widespread criticism of his misogyny.

=== Rigging allegations in 2024 elections ===
Asif's victory was challenged in 2024 elections by Pakistan Tehreek-e-Insaf Ticketholder and Independent candidate and mother of former election rival Usman Dar, she alleged that he had rigged the whole election, on which Election Commission of Pakistan stopped the final results.

=== Allegations against bureaucrats (2025) ===
In August 2025, Asif alleged via a social media post that over half of the country’s bureaucrats had acquired property in Portugal and were seeking its citizenship, linking the trend to widespread corruption. He cited the example of a former aide to ex-Punjab chief minister Usman Buzdar, who allegedly received Rs4 billion as "salami" during his daughters' weddings, suggesting that bureaucrats enjoy comfortable retirements while politicians lack similar privileges due to electoral obligations. The statement prompted significant backlash from within the civil bureaucracy and relevant institutions, including the Establishment Division and the National Accountability Bureau (NAB), both of which stated they had no evidence to support the minister’s claims. Although officials acknowledged the corruption within the bureaucracy and the abused of positions, they criticised branding “more than half” of the service as corrupt as exaggerated and potentially damaging to morale.

=== United Nations General Assembly (2025) ===
A controversy arose after columnist and social media activist Shama Junejo was seen seated behind Khawaja Asif during a United Nations Security Council session, prompting criticism over her past social media posts perceived as pro-Israel; Asif publicly distanced himself from her presence, attributing it to the Foreign Office (FO), which subsequently denied accrediting her as part of Pakistan’s official delegation. Junejo claimed she had been included by Prime Minister Shehbaz Sharif as an adviser and contributed to the drafting of his UN speech, while official sources confirmed she was part of the prime minister’s broader entourage but not formally recognized by the FO.

== Notes ==
Political offices
Unknown	Minister for Sports; 2008—2008	Unknown
Unknown	Minister for Petroleum and Natural Resources; 2008—2008	Succeeded by Asim Hussain
Preceded by Ahmad Mukhtar	Minister for Water and Power; 2013—2017	Unknown
Preceded by Naveed Qamar	Minister for Defence; 2013—2017	Succeeded by Khurram Dastgir Khan
Preceded by Nawaz Sharif	Minister for Foreign Affairs; 2017— 2018	Succeeded by Khurram Dastgir Khan
