= Killing of Ali Bilal =

2023 death in Lahore

- Location: Lahore, Punjab, Pakistan
- Date: 8 March 2023; 3 years ago
- Attack type: Extrajudicial killing
- Victim: Ali Bilal (Zilleh Shah)
- Perpetrator: Punjab Police • Government Of Punjab, Pakistan
- Motive: Hindering political protests

Ali Bilal (Urdu: علی بلال), popularly known as Zilleh Shah, a political worker of the Pakistan Tehreek-e-Insaf and resident of Jahangir Town died on 8 March 2023 in Services Hospital shortly after being released from police custody. A post-mortem report confirmed the cause of death to be excessive bleeding due to severe torture with injuries on his genitals and skull, which were likely sustained while he was in custody.

He was the son of Liaqat Ali and brother of Ali Usman, and had been present along with other political workers in support of Imran Khan outside his residence in Zaman Park when the police took him into custody under the violation of Section 144 of Code of Criminal Procedure under the order of the Pakistan Democratic Movement in order to curb political protests.

Ali Bilal, as claimed by then PTI member Fawad Chaudhary, was a special individual and a supporter of Imran Khan who was involved in fundraising for Shaukat Khanum Cancer Hospital since 1992.

== Killing ==
Ali Bilal aka Zilleh Shah, a political worker for Pakistan Tehreek e Insaf died on 8 March 2023 in police custody. A post-mortem report confirmed the cause of death to be excessive bleeding due to severe torture and injuries on his genitals and skull, which were likely sustained while in police custody. Ali Bilal, a staunch Imran Khan supporter, was picked up by the Police from Zaman Park along with other PTI workers for gathering outside Zaman Park. PTI leader Imran Khan alleged that Ali Bilal died while in police custody.

However, Punjab Inspector General Usman Anwar categorically denied all allegations of torture by the Police and termed Ali Bilal's death the result of a brutal road accident. Usman Anwar claimed that the post-mortem reports were massively misinterpreted and that the Police could not be held liable for the death.

=== Punjab Police claim ===
The Inspector General of the Punjab Police, claimed that the accident occurred in Fortress Stadium and that CCTV footage showed two individuals in a Black Vigo dropping Ali Bilal's body off at the Services Hospital in Lahore. The individuals, according to Police, were identified through CCTV along with the vehicle's owner. The Police also arrested two suspects, Umar and Jahnzeb, who allegedly brought Ali Bilal to Services Hospital.

== Investigation ==
=== Post-Mortem ===
According to reports, Ali Bilal was subjected to torture resulting in his death. Two unidentified individuals in a black car who fled the scene took his body to Services Hospital. Officials at the hospital verified that Bilal had been assaulted and had already died from his injuries before he arrived at the emergency department. The post-mortem confirms that he died from excessive bleeding caused by a severe head blow and was also tortured on sensitive parts of his body.

=== PTI's Stance ===
Imran Khan claims that Ali Bilal was murdered while in police custody. He shared videos showing Ali Bilal in the police van alive and then claimed that he was killed by the Police later.

=== Mohsin Naqvi ===
Punjab caretaker Chief Minister Mohsin Naqvi refuted PTI's claims and claimed that Ali Bilal, was killed in a car accident and that PTI Punjab leader Raja Shakeel, the owner of the vehicle in which Bilal's body was brought to the Services Hospital, informed Yasmeen Rashid that a man had been hit by a car. Naqvi stated that all the evidence regarding the accident would be presented before the court.

A complaint was lodged by Inspector Adnan Bukhari at Sarwar Road Police Station, leading to a case against the PTI leaders, including Imran Khan, Fawad Chaudhry, Farukh Habib, Yasmeen Rashid, Raja Shakeel, and others. Jahanzeb Nawaz, the alleged driver of the vehicle that hit Ali near Fortress Stadium, allegedly told the Police during the investigation, mentioned that he was driving his company's vehicle to visit his friend Umar Fareed near Fortress and hit Ali while returning to drop off the car near Waris Road. He took Ali to the hospital as he was injured and was taken to Lahore Services Hospital after being unable to get proper medical attention at the Combined Military Hospital. Jahanzeb added that he left the hospital once he was informed by a doctor that Ali had died, parked the vehicle at Waris Road, and went to his residence near Sherpao on a rickshaw.

=== Maryam Audio Leak ===
However, questions have been raised about the role of Mohsin Naqvi and the IGP in presenting the case as an accident following a leaked audio recording purportedly featuring PML-N's Maryam Nawaz suggesting turning the murder of a PTI worker into an accident committed by his party members.

Meanwhile, The Pakistan Tehreek-e-Insaf (PTI) party filed a petition with the Lahore High Court against a joint investigation team (JIT) formed to investigate the alleged murder of Ali Bilal and other cases registered against the party leaders. The JIT had summoned PTI leaders, including Imran Khan and Fawad Chaudhry, to record their statements, but some decided not to appear and will be represented by lawyers. The PTI leaders argue that the cases are baseless and fake and have asked the court to void the notification regarding the constitution of the investigation team.

=== Other effects ===
An anti-terrorism court in Lahore gave police physical remand of five people accused of being involved in the death of Ali Bilal. According to the Police, under section 164 of CrPC, the suspects admitted to hitting Bilal with their vehicle, and custody is required to finish the investigation. The accused were to be held in detention for 14 days.

== Reactions ==
Imran Khan, the leader of Pakistan Tehreek-e-Insaf (PTI), shared a video of Bilal, whose tragic death sparked shock and outrage in the country. The emotional video showcased Ali Bilal's love for Imran Khan and the PTI and garnered immense support on social media, with people expressing their condolences and anger towards the incident. After Ali Bilal's death, the public demanded a judicial investigation, but some believed that justice would not be served as leaders are considered untouchable while workers are expendable. Fawad Chaudhry, a former federal minister and Pakistan Tehreek-e-Insaf (PTI) Vice President, alleged that CCTV videos of the Lahore Safe City were being edited to cover up a murder and accused the Capital City Police Officer and Interior Minister of being among the four main accused in the case.

Imran Khan denied the claim of the Inspector General of Punjab Police and accused him and Naqvi of lying and demanded their resignation along with others for the murder of Bilal and violence against his party members. He also called for a judicial commission to investigate the issue.

Ali Bilal's father, Liaquat Ali, he was made to wait for two and a half hours to meet Imran Khan at his residence while his son's body was still at the hospital. He expressed fear that the PTI's version of events could be "political point scoring." as reported by Asma Shirazi, Pakistan Tehreek-e-Insaf (PTI) have denied any such claims.
