= Syed Nazim Hussain Shah (politician, born 1940) =

Pakistani politician

- سید ناظم حسین شاہ

Member of the Provincial Assembly of the Punjab
- In office 1988–1990

Member of the Provincial Assembly of the Punjab
- In office 1993–1995

Provincial minister of Punjab
- In office 1993–1996

Member of the Provincial Assembly of the Punjab
- In office 2002–2004

Member of the Provincial Assembly of the Punjab
- In office 2008–2010

Personal details
- Born: Syed Nazim Hussain Shah; 23 March 1940 Multan, Punjab, Pakistan
- Died: 30 November 2020 (aged 80) Multan, Pakistan
- Party: Pakistan Peoples Party
- Occupation: Politician

Syed Nazim Hussain Shah (Urdu: سید ناظم حسین شاہ) was a Pakistani politician and a founding member of the Pakistan People's Party (PPP). He was from Kot Faqir Ali Shah, in the Muzaffarabad area of Multan, Punjab, Pakistan. He served as a Member of the Provincial Assembly of Punjab five times and also served as a provincial minister.

== Early life and education ==
Syed Nazim Hussain Shah was born on 23 March 1940 in Kot Faqir Ali Shah, Multan.

== Political career ==
Shah joined the Pakistan People's Party and became one of its founding members. In 1971, he was appointed chairman of the Public Works Programme by Prime Minister Zulfikar Ali Bhutto. In 1987, he was elected to the Zila Council. He was elected to the Punjab Assembly in the 1988 general election. He lost the 1990 election but returned to the assembly in 1993 on a PPP ticket. He served as Punjab's provincial minister for Local Government and Excise and Taxation during the government of Manzoor Ahmad Wattoo. He was elected again to the Punjab Assembly in 2002 and 2008. He was reported to have been elected as an MPA five times during his political career.

== Death ==
Syed Nazim Hussain Shah died on 30 November 2020 in Multan at the age of 80 after a prolonged illness. His funeral prayers were held in his ancestral village of Kot Faqir Ali Shah. Former prime minister Yousaf Raza Gillani and former foreign minister Shah Mahmood Qureshi expressed condolences following his death.
