= Usman Dar =

Pakistani businessman politician

Special Assistant to the Prime Minister on Youth Affairs
- In office 29 April 2021 – 10 April 2022
- President: Arif Alvi
- Prime Minister: Imran Khan
- In office 3 December 2018 – 12 February 2021
- President: Arif Alvi
- Prime Minister: Imran Khan

Chairman of the Prime Minister's Youth Programme
- In office 10 October 2018 – 12 February 2021

Personal details
- Born: 28 August 1974 (age 52) Sialkot, Punjab, Pakistan
- Other political affiliations: PTI (2013–2023)
- Parent: Rehana Dar

Usman Dar (Urdu: عثمان ڈار) is a Pakistani politician who was Special Adviser to the former Prime Minister of Pakistan, Imran Khan on Youth Affairs. He was in office from 3 December 2018 until his resignation from the parliament on 10 April 2022. He also held the position of Chairman of the Prime Minister's Youth Programme during his term.

== Personal life ==
Usman Dar was born on 28 August 1974 in Sialkot, Pakistan to a businessman Imtiazuddin Dar. He belongs to a Punjabi speaking Kashmiri family.

Usman Dar currently serves his family business as the Sales Director of VIP Group of Companies.

== Education ==
Dar has a Bachelor of Commerce degree from the University of the Punjab.

== Political career ==
He ran for the seat of the Provincial Assembly of the Punjab as an independent candidate from PP-122 (Sialkot-II) in the 2008 Punjab provincial election but was unsuccessful. He received only 54 votes and lost the seat to Chaudhry Muhammad Akhlaq.

He ran for the seat of the National Assembly of Pakistan as a candidate of the Pakistan Tehreek-e-Insaf (PTI) from NA-110 (Sialkot-I) in the 2013 Pakistani general election but was unsuccessful. He received 71,573 votes and lost the seat to Khawaja Muhammad Asif.

He ran for the seat of the National Assembly as a candidate of the PTI from NA-73 (Sialkot-II) in the 2018 Pakistani general election but was unsuccessful. He received 115,464 votes and lost the seat to Khawaja Muhammad Asif.

On 10 October 2018, Prime Minister Imran Khan appointed Dar as Chairman of the Prime Minister's Youth Programme. On 12 October, a resolution was submitted in the Provincial Assembly of the Punjab against the appointment of Dar due to his dubious degree. The resolution also noted that appointment was "clear violation of merit and unacceptable as he had suffered a massive defeat in the general elections". On 13 October, Pakistan Today also noted that Dar's appointment as chairman of the Prime Minister's Youth Programme violates 2014 order of Lahore High Court.

On 3 December 2018, Prime Minister Imran Khan appointed him as his Special Assistant to PM on Youth Affairs.

On October 4, 2023, after 4 months of disappearance due to 9 May Protest, Usman Dar appeared in an interview and declared to leave Pakistan Tehreek-e-Insaf and Politics.
