= Prime Minister's Youth Programme =

Pakistani governmental youth programme

- وزیراعظم یوتھ پروگرام

Agency overview
- Formed: 2013; 13 years ago
- Type: Youth affairs
- Jurisdiction: Government of Pakistan
- Status: Active
- Headquarters: Prime Minister's Secretariat
- Minister responsible: Shehbaz Sharif
- Agency executives: Rana Mashhood Ahmad Khan, Chairman; Rizwan Anwar, Special Representative to the Prime Minister's Youth Programme
- Website: https://pmyp.gov.pk/

The Prime Minister's Youth Programme (PMYP), also known historically as the Kamyab Jawan Programme, is a government initiative in Pakistan established in 2013. It aims to support young people through education, skills development, employment, entrepreneurship, sports and other youth-focused initiatives.

The programme has included initiatives such as business and agricultural loans, skills training, scholarships, laptop distribution, sports talent hunts and youth engagement activities. The programme's current framework identifies four principal areas of focus: education, employment, engagement and environment.

Rana Mashhood Ahmad Khan took charge as chairman of the programme in March 2024, according to the Government of Pakistan's Press Information Department. Rizwan Anwar has been identified in programme-related reporting as a Special Representative to the Prime Minister's Youth Programme, including in connection with international youth cooperation and engagement.

== History ==
The Prime Minister's Youth Programme was launched in 2013 during the government of Prime Minister Nawaz Sharif. Its initial initiatives included interest-free loans, youth business loans, vocational training, skills development, laptop distribution and fee reimbursement for eligible students from less-developed areas. The programme was headed by Maryam Nawaz Sharif during its initial phase.

The original programme comprised several schemes, including the Prime Minister's Interest-Free Loan Scheme, Prime Minister's Youth Business Loans, Youth Training Scheme, Youth Skills Development Scheme, Prime Minister's Laptop Scheme and fee reimbursement for students from less-developed areas.

In May 2014, the government approved an interest-free loan initiative intended to provide financing to eligible people across Pakistan, with a focus on rural communities and women's participation.

Several of the earlier schemes were discontinued or changed after the Pakistan Tehreek-e-Insaf government took office in 2018.

In September 2019, the programme was renamed the Kamyab Jawan Programme. The initiative included an entrepreneurship scheme intended to provide financing to young business owners.

In July 2022, disbursements under the Kamyab Jawan Programme were paused. The government subsequently announced the revival of various youth schemes in December 2022, including changes to the youth loan programme.

In March 2023, the federal government announced a youth development package valued at 150 billion Pakistani rupees, covering initiatives such as internships, technical and vocational training, laptops, scholarships, sports facilities and research support.

== Leadership ==
=== Rana Mashhood Ahmad Khan ===
Rana Mashhood Ahmad Khan took charge as chairman of the Prime Minister's Youth Programme on 30 March 2024. His appointment was announced by the Press Information Department of Pakistan.

The programme's official communications identify him as chairman and associate his tenure with youth development initiatives involving education, employment, digital opportunities, sports and engagement.

In April 2025, Dawn reported on his discussions with youth influencers about the programme's initiatives, including the National Volunteer Corps, youth loans and the Digital Youth Hub.

=== Rizwan Anwar ===
Rizwan Anwar is serving as a Special Representative to the Prime Minister's Youth Programme. Radio Pakistan reported on 25 January 2025 that he held the more specific designation of Special Representative to the Prime Minister's Youth Programme on International Linkages.

In the interview, he discussed the programme's focus on education, employment, environment and engagement. He also spoke about entrepreneurship, youth opportunities, the laptop scheme and initiatives intended to support employment and business development.

In October 2025, the Associated Press of Pakistan reported that Rizwan Anwar represented Pakistan at the OIC Youth Capital 2025 Volunteers and Youth Gathering in Marrakesh, Morocco. According to the report, he presented Pakistan's approach to youth empowerment and discussed the Digital Youth Hub and opportunities for international youth cooperation.

The Prime Minister's Youth Programme has also identified Rizwan Anwar Virk as a Special Representative in its official LinkedIn communications.

== Programmes and initiatives ==
The Prime Minister's Youth Programme encompasses initiatives intended to improve young people's access to education, employment, entrepreneurship and public engagement.

=== Education and skills development ===
The programme provides information about skills training, vocational courses, scholarships and educational opportunities. Its Digital Youth Hub lists courses and certifications offered through partnerships and other youth-development initiatives.

The Prime Minister's Youth Skills Development Programme is also implemented through the National Vocational and Technical Training Commission, which provides information about technical and vocational training opportunities.

=== Employment and entrepreneurship ===
The Prime Minister's Youth Business and Agriculture Loan Scheme supports eligible applicants seeking to establish or expand businesses. The programme's online portal provides application information and details of participating financial institutions.

The wider youth development package announced in 2023 included internships, business support, innovation grants, technical training and other employment-related initiatives.

=== Digital initiatives ===
The Prime Minister's Digital Youth Hub serves as an online portal for information about educational opportunities, employment, training, entrepreneurship, scholarships, internships and other initiatives. The portal describes its approach through the four areas of education, employment, engagement and environment.

=== Sports and youth engagement ===
The programme includes sports talent-hunt initiatives and opportunities for young people to participate in productive activities. Its engagement programmes include the National Youth Council and National Volunteer Corps.

The National Volunteer Corps aims to develop volunteer capacity in areas including disaster-risk reduction, climate resilience, alternative learning pathways and economic inclusion.

== See also ==
Government of Pakistan

Prime Minister's Laptop Scheme

Youth in Pakistan
