= Syed Nazim Hussain Shah (politician, born 1950) =

Pakistani politician

- پیر سید ناظم حسین شاہ

Member of the Provincial Assembly of the Punjab
- In office 2008–2013

Member of the Provincial Assembly of the Punjab
- In office 2002–2007

Member of the Provincial Assembly of the Punjab
- In office 1993–1996

Member of the Provincial Assembly of the Punjab
- In office 1988–1990

Member of the Provincial Assembly of the Punjab
- In office 1972–1977

Personal details
- Born: Syed Nazim Hussain Shah; 3 March 1950 Lahore, Punjab, Pakistan
- Party: Pakistan Peoples Party
- Occupation: Politician

Syed Nazim Hussain Shah (Urdu: پیر سید ناظم حسین; is a Pakistani politician who served as a Member of the Provincial Assembly of the Punjab with his political party Pakistan Peoples Party (PPP) from 1972 to 2018.

== Career ==
He was first elected in to the Seventh Assembly of the Provincial Assembly of the Punjab in 1972, serving through 1977. He was elected again to the Tenth Assembly (1988–90), the Twelfth Assembly (1993-1996), the Fourteenth Assembly (2002-2007) and the Fifteenth Assembly (2008-2013). In 2013, he finished in third place in the election for the Provincial Assembly of the Punjab.
