= Samasata–Amruka Branch Line =

Railway line in Pakistan

Samasata-Amruka Branch Line سمّہ سٹّہ–امرُوکا فرعی ریلوے خط

Overview
- Status: Suspended
- Owner: Pakistan Railways
- Termini: Samasata Junction; Amruka
- Stations: 31

Service
- Operator(s): Pakistan Railways

History
- Opened: 1894
- Closed: July 26, 2011

Technical
- Line length: 257 km (160 mi)

Samasata–Amruka Branch Line (Urdu: سمّہ سٹّہ–امرُوکا فرعی ریلوے خط) was one of several branch lines in Pakistan, operated and maintained by Pakistan Railways. The line began at Samasata Junction and ended at Amruka. The total length of this railway line is 257 kilometers (160 mi) with 31 railway stations. This Railway line was closed in 2011. However recently efforts have been underway to reopen the line. The rail tracks are in the Samasatta-Amruka Section (total cost: PKR 7.735 billion)۔. Work on this railway line is closed.

== Stations ==
- Samasata Junction
- Kutal Imara Jn
- Baghdad
- Dera Bakha
- Abbasnagar
- Lal Suhanra
- Goth Shah Muhammad
- Asrani
- Tamewali
- Goolpur Talbani
- Sheikh Wahan
- Qaimpur
- Hasilpur
- Khanqah Muhammad Panah
- Bakhshan Khan
- Sadiqpur
- Chistian
- Sakhi Shauq Ilahi
- Chak Abdullah
- Madrisa
- Takht Mahal
- Girdhariwala
- Bahawalnagar Junction
- Mitti Roya
- Chaweka Road
- Chabiana
- Minchinabad
- Chet Singhwala
- Mandi Sadiq Ganj Junction
- Sobha Wala
- Amruka

== See also ==
- Karachi–Peshawar Railway Line
- Railway lines in Pakistan
