= Bahawalnagar–Fort Abbas Branch Line =

Railway line in Pakistan

Overview
- Native name: بہاولنگر–فورٹ عبّاس فرعی ریلوے خط
- Status: Suspended
- Owner: Pakistan Railways
- Termini: Bahawalnagar Junction; Fort Abbas
- Stations: 13

Service
- Operator: Pakistan Railways

History
- Opened: April 28, 1928
- Closed: 2002

Technical
- Line length: 102 km (63 mi)
- Track gauge: 1,676 mm (5 ft 6 in)

Bahawalnagar–Fort Abbas Branch Line (Urdu: بہاولنگر–فورٹ عبّاس فرعی ریلوے خط) was one of several branch lines in Pakistan, operated and maintained by Pakistan Railways. The line began at Bahawalnagar Junction and ended at Fort Abbas. The total length of this railway line is 102 kilometers (63 mi) with 13 railway stations.

== History ==
The branch line was initially referred to as the Bahawalnagar-Fort Abbas Railway and was a Darbar line financed by the Princely Bahawalpur State. The line opened in 1928 as part of the North Western State Railway network. The line was owned by the Bahawalpur State Darbar, who also owned the Khanpur–Chachran Railway, and formed an important part of the NWR network. Following Pakistan's independence, the line became part of the Pakistan Railways network.

== Stations ==
- Bahawalnagar Junction
- Dhab Sanateka
- Sawaiwala
- Dunga Bunga
- Khatan
- Haroonabad
- Mubarakabad Halt
- Faqirwali
- Rafiqabad
- Khichi Wala
- Shahbazwala
- Tibba Alamgir Halt
- Fort Abbas

== See also ==
- Samasata-Amruka Branch Line
- Mandra–Bhaun Railway
- Karachi–Peshawar Railway Line
- Railway lines in Pakistan
