= Minchinabad railway station =

Railway station in Punjab, Pakistan

Minchinabad Railway Station منچن آباد ریلوے اسٹیشن

General information
- Coordinates: 30.149253°N 73.586415°E
- Owner: Ministry of Railways
- Line: Samasata–Amruka Branch Line

Other information
- Station code: MCD

Services
Preceding station	Pakistan Railways	Following station
Bahawalnagar Junction towards Samasata Junction	Samasata–Amruka Branch Line	Mandi Sadiq Ganj Junction towards Amruka
Location

Minchinabad Railway Station (Urdu: منچن آباد ریلوے اسٹیشن, Punjabi: منچن آباد ریلوے اسٹیشن) is located in Minchinabad, Punjab, Pakistan.

== See also ==
- List of railway stations in Pakistan
- Pakistan Railways
