= Bahawalnagar (disambiguation) =

Bahawalnagar is a city in Punjab, Pakistan.

Bahawalnagar may also refer to:

- Bahawalnagar District, a district situated in Punjab.
- Bahawalnagar Tehsil, an administration unit of Bahawalnagar district.
- Bahawalnagar Junction railway station, a railway station in Punjab.

== See also ==
- Bahawalnagar-Fort Abbas Branch Line, one of the branch line in Pakistan.
