= Bahawalnagar =

Bahawalnagar بہاول نگر (Punjabi)
- City
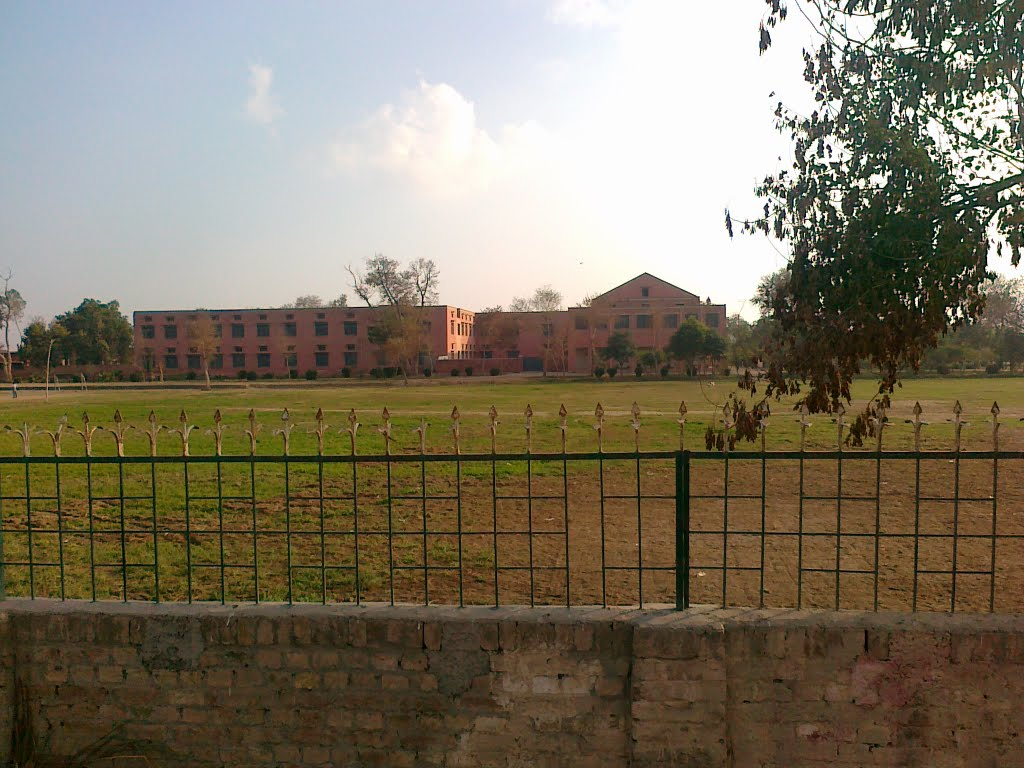
- Govt Post Graduate College for Boys, Bahawalnagar

- Municipal Committee logo

- Location of Bahawalnagar Bahawalnagar (Pakistan)
- Coordinates: 29°59′34″N 73°15′13″E
- Country: Pakistan
- Province: (Punjab, Pakistan) Punjab
- Division: Bahawalpur
- District: Bahawalnagar
- Union councils: 118

Government
  - Type: Municipal Committee
  - Chairman: Vacant
  - Vice Chairman: Vacant
- Elevation: 163 m (535 ft)

Population (2023)
  - City: 241,873
  - Rank: 39th, Pakistan
- Time zone: UTC+05:00 (PKT)
  - Summer (DST): +06:00
- Website: Municipal Committee Bahawalnagar

Bahawalnagar (Punjabi, Urdu: بہاول نگر), is the capital city of Bahawalnagar District in the Punjab province of Pakistan. The city of Bahawalnagar is the headquarter of the district and tehsil as well. It is the 39th largest city of Pakistan by population according to the 2023 census. Old name of Bahawalnagar was Rojanwali/Ubbha. It was named Bahawalnagar in 1904 after Bahawal Khan V, the ruler of the Bahawalpur state comprising the present districts of Bahawalpur, Bahawalnagar and Rahim Yar Khan. It is 262 km (163 mi) south of Lahore and about 175 km (109 mi) miles east of Bahawalpur. It is 65 km (40 mi) far from District Pakpattan. River Sutlej passes on the northern side at a distance of about 6 miles.

== History ==
Bahawalnagar originally known as Rojhanwali was a small settlement consisting of few huts and shacks. This village Rojhanwali is still in existence at a distance of about 1.5 miles north of the Railway Station. Bahawalnagar is located at the historic road constructed by Mughal Emperor Sher Shah Suri.

In the year 1895, a railway station was established and was named as Rojhanwali Railway Station. It was a junction between Bahawalnagar and Bhatinda at distance of 113 miles, now linking branch lines Amrooka and Fort Abbas. Before partition it was very busy junction. Trains used to run from Karachi to Delhi and vice versa via Bahawalnagar. Passenger trains also used to run from Bahawalnagar to Fazilka, Ferozpur. There was a loco shed and two institutes meant for recreation.

In 1904 when Nawab Mohammad Bahawal Khan Abbasi IV, who originally ruled over Bahawalpur State visited Rojhanwali the people asked that with His permission they want to rename the city on the name of Nawab, The Nawab allowed them with pleasure and since then the city is named as Bahawalnagar. With the advent of railways, 40–50 shops with a population of 100 dwelling units developed at existing railway bazar. Though this site was not fit for flourishing as the topographical features were not favorable and drinking water was unfit for health. With the introduction of canal system, it has become fertile area. The real achievement was Fordwah Canal which brought almost the entire district under the command of irrigation system. The town developed as colony town south of railway station.

In the year 1900–1901, first police station post was established and in 1902–1903 the first primary school was established. In the year 1906 a panchayat committee consisting of nominated members was composed. 1914 Bahawalnagar was recommended as Tehsil and the police post Jweka was shifted to Bahawalnagar. A regular municipal committee was constituted in year 1922 along with many members. The Assistant Commissioner and Tehsildar were then appointed as Mir Majlis and Naib Mir Majlis.

== Education ==
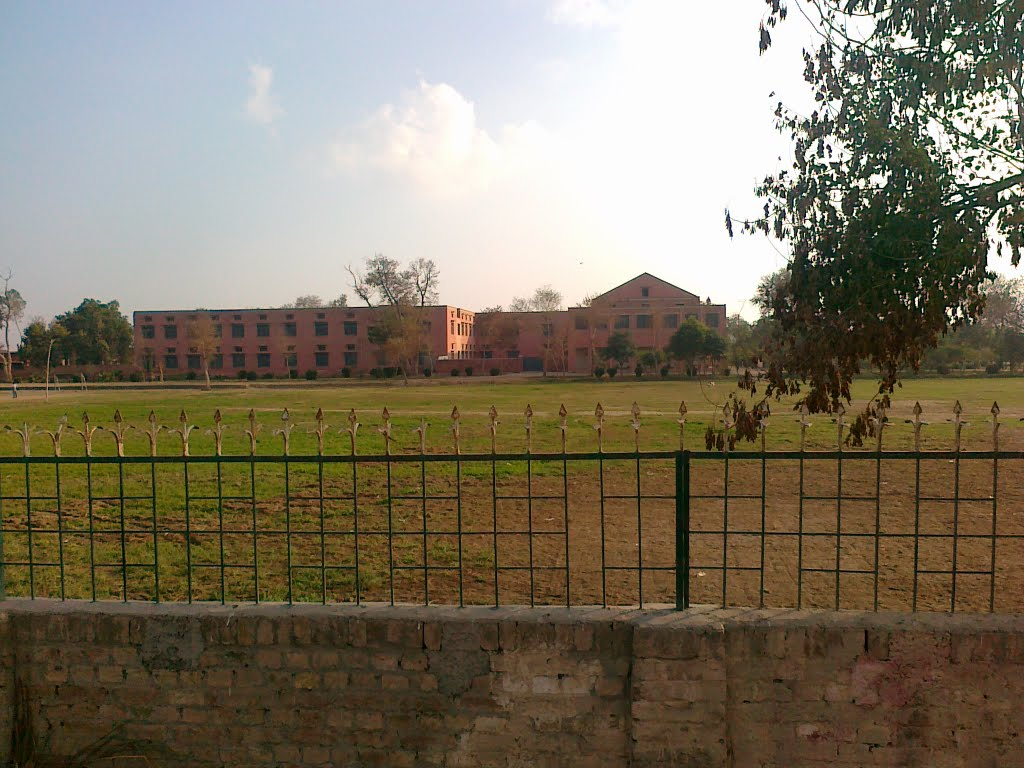
Govt post graduate college Bahawalnagar is the biggest college of Bahawalnagar District

The literacy rate of Bahawalnagar is less than 25% and unemployment rate is much higher than 25%. As the literacy rate of this city is not quite enough but the government owned institutions are offering their services to increase the literacy rate. The sub-Campus of Islamia University is also located in Bahawalnagar.

== Sports ground ==
Haider Stadium is the biggest stadium of Bahawalnagar City as well as Bahawalnagar District.

== Demographics ==
Population

Historical population

Year	Pop.	±% p.a.
1951	18,372	—
1961	36,290	+7.04%
1972	50,991	+3.14%
1981	74,533	+4.31%

Year	Pop.	±% p.a.
1998	111,313	+2.39%
2017	160,883	+1.96%
2023	241,873	+7.03%

According to the 2023 census, Bahawalnagar city had a population of 241,873.

Languages

Languages of Bahawalnagar city (2023)
1. Punjabi (77.1%)
2. Urdu (22.4%)
3. Others (0.50%)

== Climate ==
Bahawalnagar has a semi-arid climate (Köppen climate classification BSh) with very hot summers and mild winters. Precipitation mostly falls in the monsoon season from June to September, although some rain also falls from February to April. Over the years, global climate change has affected Bahawalnagar as well as any other place on Earth and below comparison charts from Weatherbase and NOAA show the difference in rainfall and low temperatures between 1990 and 2015. The monsoon rains can be heavy and may cause floodings. Westerly waves can cause heavy rainfall and hail from November to May

Climate data for Bahawalnagar, Pakistan
Month	Jan	Feb	Mar	Apr	May	Jun	Jul	Aug	Sep	Oct	Nov	Dec	Year
Mean daily maximum °C (°F)	20 (68)	23 (73)	29 (84)	36 (96)	40 (104)	41 (105)	38 (100)	37 (98)	36 (96)	34 (93)	28 (82)	22 (71)	32 (89)
Mean daily minimum °C (°F)	4 (39)	7 (44)	11 (55)	17 (66)	22 (73)	26.9 (82)	27 (80)	27 (80)	24 (75)	17 (62)	11 (51)	6 (42)	17 (62)
Average precipitation mm (inches)	18 (0.7)	18 (0.3)	21 (0.8)	13 (0.1)	28 (0.3)	79 (0.8)	162 (3.6)	145 (2.9)	59 (1.4)	25 (1.0)	5 (0.2)	1 (0.0)	50.5 (14.1)
Source: Weatherbase 2015

Climate data for Bahawalnagar
Month	Jan	Feb	Mar	Apr	May	Jun	Jul	Aug	Sep	Oct	Nov	Dec	Year
Record high °C (°F)	29.3 (84.7)	35.6 (96.1)	41.5 (106.7)	45.6 (114.1)	48.0 (118.4)	50.1 (122.2)	46.0 (114.8)	42.4 (108.3)	42.0 (107.6)	42.0 (107.6)	37.0 (98.6)	29.6 (85.3)	50.1 (122.2)
Mean daily maximum °C (°F)	18.6 (65.5)	19.76 (67.57)	26.3 (79.3)	33.9 (93.0)	39.8 (103.6)	41.7 (107.1)	36.3 (97.3)	34.4 (93.9)	34.5 (94.1)	33.2 (91.8)	25.6 (78.1)	20.5 (68.9)	30.38 (86.68)
Daily mean °C (°F)	13.3 (55.9)	15.7 (60.3)	21.0 (69.8)	28.0 (82.4)	32.8 (91.0)	35.1 (95.2)	33.1 (91.6)	32.4 (90.3)	30.6 (87.1)	26.4 (79.5)	20.6 (69.1)	15.0 (59.0)	25.3 (77.6)
Mean daily minimum °C (°F)	4.8 (40.6)	7.4 (45.3)	12.5 (54.5)	18.5 (65.3)	23.7 (74.7)	26.2 (79.2)	27.7 (81.9)	26.4 (79.5)	24.7 (76.5)	17.5 (63.5)	10.6 (51.1)	6.6 (43.9)	17.2 (63.0)
Record low °C (°F)	0.0 (32.0)	−1.0 (30.2)	3.9 (39.0)	12.6 (54.7)	14.4 (57.9)	17.5 (63.5)	16.1 (61.0)	21.4 (70.5)	13.1 (55.6)	11.0 (51.8)	4.0 (39.2)	1.7 (35.1)	−1.0 (30.2)
Average precipitation mm (inches)	12.5 (0.49)	26.5 (1.04)	30.2 (1.19)	25.2 (0.99)	24.8 (0.98)	65.3 (2.57)	160.2 (6.31)	130.9 (5.15)	69.5 (2.74)	11.0 (0.43)	4.3 (0.17)	9.0 (0.35)	569.4 (22.41)
Mean monthly sunshine hours	222.4	218.9	250.8	274.3	269.1	213.9	218.3	256.6	279.3	284.0	260.8	223.5	2,971.9
Source: NOAA (1971–1990)

== See also ==
- Bahawalnagar District
- Bahawalnagar Junction railway station
- Islamia University
- Punjab, Pakistan
- India–Pakistan relations

== Bibliography ==
- Economic Review, vol. 21, Economic & Industrial Publications, 1990
- Working paper understanding the role of political dynasties: Local Government Election 2005, Pattan Development Organization, 2006
