= Asrani railway station =

Railway station in Pakistan

Asrani Railway Station اسرانی ریلوے اسٹیشن

General information
- Coordinates: 29.5195°N 72.1363°E
- Owner: Ministry of Railways
- Line: Samasata–Amruka Branch Line

Other information
- Station code: ANN

Services
Preceding station	Pakistan Railways	Following station
Lal Suhanra towards Samasata Junction	Samasata–Amruka Branch Line	Tamewali towards Amruka
Location

Asrani Railway Station (Urdu: اسرانی ریلوے اسٹیشن, Punjabi: اسرانی ریلوے اسٹیشن) is located in Pakistan.

== See also ==
- List of railway stations in Pakistan
- Pakistan Railways
