= Dera Bakha railway station =

Defunct railway station in Pakistan

General information
- Owner: Ministry of Railways

Other information
- Station code: BKE

Dera Bakha railway station (Urdu: ڈیرہ بکھا ریلوے اسٹیشن) is a defunct railway station located on Samasata–Amruka Branch Line, in Bahawalpur, Punjab, Pakistan. The former station lies between Baghdad railway station and Abbasnagar railway station.

== See also ==
- List of railway stations in Pakistan
- Pakistan Railways
