= Lal Suhanra railway station =

Railway station in Pakistan

Lal Suhanra Station لال سہانرا ریلوے اسٹیشن

General information
- Coordinates: 29.4675°N 71.9854°E
- Owner: Ministry of Railways
- Line: Samasata–Amruka Branch Line

Other information
- Station code: LSA

Services
Preceding station	Pakistan Railways	Following station
Abbasnagar towards Samasata Junction	Samasata–Amruka Branch Line	Asrani towards Amruka
Location

Lal Suhanra Railway Station (Urdu: لال سہانرا ریلوے اسٹیشن, Punjabi: لال سوہانرا ریلوے اسٹیشن) is located in Pakistan.

== See also ==
- Lal Suhanra National Park
- List of railway stations in Pakistan
- Pakistan Railways
