= Chachar =

Sindhi agricultural tribe

چاچڙ

Regions with significant populations
- Sindh, Punjab

Religion
- Islam

Related ethnic groups
- Sindhi people

Chachar or Chacher (Sindhi: چاچڙ; Urdu: چاچڑ) is a Sindhi Sammat agricultural tribe. They are found in the Sindh and Punjab provinces of Pakistan.

== Distribution ==
In Sindh, majority of them are settled at Sukkur, Ghotki, Kashmore, Jacobabad and Larkana districts. While a minority resides at Nawabshah, Thatta, Tharparkar and Hyderabad. In Punjab, they are settled at Multan, Khushab, Toba Tek Singh, Sargodha and Sahiwal, while majority of them are found at Mithankot and Chachran Sharif. Agriculturist Chachars own land in the area between Guddu Barrage and Thatta. Chachars in the Sukkur were involved in a feud with members of the Mahar tribe in the early years of the 21st century.

The present chief of the Chachar tribe in Sindh is Sardar Aftab Ahmed khan Chachar. The former chief of the Chachar tribe was Sardar Haji Khan Chachar. He was formerly a two-time member of the Provincial Assembly of Sindh. He has also been an advisor to the CM of Sindh for one time. He was politically linked to PPP. he left the party for some time, but again rejoined.

Muhammad Hayat al-Sindi (died 3 February 1750) was an 18th-century Islamic scholar belonging to the Chachar tribe, whose teachings influenced the Wahhabi movement.

== Clans ==
- Jaganand: Balilani, Bhura, Dagrecha, Gula, Gārheja, Jamani, Kacha, Kheda, Mākalwadi, Muria, Sāngi.
- Chhutta: Balra, Dādani, Danborai, Dhāndhiyani, Dhānra, Dhagani, Dalani, Janija, Kār'ra, Kuna, Nangani, Phalani, Posti, Raanji, Sākhani, Shaikhani, Toba. JOGANRI
- Narang: Halwai, Jonāna, Jogiyani, Kuah, Lush, Mānghra, Matani, Rajdeha, Redhi, Sadhani.

Other clans: Chadwa, Chamyāl, Chanda/Chandwār, Chhachhar, Chhichhar, Dola, Dhudha, Dhanjun, Dang, Dhanga, Duheja, Doowani, Gabrani, Gobja, Jhanjha, Kalra, Kharyani, Muda, Miryani, Rāmān, Rāhi, Ramba, Rahmani, Rukāna, Zikriyani.
