= Khanpur–Chachran Railway =

Railway line in Pakistan

Overview
- Native name: خانپور– چاچڑان ریلوے
- Status: Closed
- Owner: Pakistan Railways
- Termini: Khanpur Junction; Chachran
- Stations: 5

Service
- Operator(s): Pakistan Railways

History
- Opened: 2 July 1911

Technical
- Line length: 33 km (21 mi)
- Track gauge: 1,676 mm (5 ft 6 in)

Khanpur–Chachran Railway (Urdu: خانپور– چاچڑان ریلوے) was one of several branch lines in Pakistan, operated and maintained by Pakistan Railways. The line began at Khanpur Junction and ended at Chachran. The total length of this railway line is 36 kilometers (22 mi) with 5 railway stations.

== History ==
The branch line was initially referred to as the Bahawalpur Royal Railway and was a Darbar line financed by the Princely Bahawalpur State. The line opened in 1911 as part of the North Western State Railway network. The line was owned by the Bahawalpur State Darbar, who also owned the Bahawalnagar–Fort Abbas Railway. Following Pakistan's independence, the line became part of the Pakistan Railways network. The line linked Khanpur and Chachran.

== Stations ==
- Khanpur Junction
- Kotla Pathan
- Jajja Abbasian
- Zahir Pir
- Chachran

== See also ==
- Samasata-Amruka Branch Line
- Mandra–Bhaun Railway
- Karachi–Peshawar Railway Line
- Railway lines in Pakistan
