= Madrisa railway station =

Railway station in Pakistan

Madrisa Railway Station مدرسہ ریلوے اسٹیشن

General information
- Coordinates: 29.9029°N 73.0378°E
- Owner: Ministry of Railways
- Line: Samasata–Amruka Branch Line

Other information
- Station code: MEE

Services
Preceding station	Pakistan Railways	Following station
Chistian towards Samasata Junction	Samasata–Amruka Branch Line	Bahawalnagar Junction towards Amruka
Location

Madrisa Railway Station (Urdu: مدرسہ ریلوے اسٹیشن, Punjabi: مدرسہ ریلوے اسٹیشن) is located in Pakistan.

== See also ==
- List of railway stations in Pakistan
- Pakistan Railways
