= Jajja Abbasian railway station =

Railway station in Pakistan

Jajja Abbasian Railway Station ججہ عباسیاں ریلوے اسٹیشن

General information
- Owner: Ministry of Railways
- Line: Khanpur–Chachran Railway

Other information
- Station code: JJH

Services
Preceding station	Pakistan Railways	Following station
Kotla Pathan towards Khanpur	Khanpur–Chachran Railway (defunct)	Zahir Pir towards Chachran
Location

Jajja Abbasian Railway Station (Urdu: ججہ عباسیاں ریلوے اسٹیشن) is located in khanpur district Rahim Yar Khan Pakistan. This railway station was built by Nawab Sadiq who was Nawab of Bahawalpur.

== See also ==
- List of railway stations in Pakistan
- Pakistan Railways
