= Hasilpur railway station =

Railway station in Pakistan

Hasilpur Railway Station حاصل پور ریلوے اسٹیشن

General information
- Coordinates: 29.696865°N 72.548535°E
- Owner: Ministry of Railways
- Line: Samasata–Amruka Branch Line

Other information
- Station code: HSU

Services
Preceding station	Pakistan Railways	Following station
Sheikh Wahan towards Samasata Junction	Samasata–Amruka Branch Line	Bakhshan Khan towards Amruka
Location

Hasilpur Railway Station (Urdu: حاصل پور ریلوے اسٹیشن, Punjabi: حاصل پور ریلوے اسٹیشن) is located in Pakistan.

== See also ==
- List of railway stations in Pakistan
- Pakistan Railways
