= Bakhshan Khan railway station =

Railway station in Pakistan

Bakhshan Khan Station بخشن خان ریلوے اسٹیشن

General information
- Coordinates: 29.7389°N 72.7194°E
- Owner: Ministry of Railways
- Line: Samasata–Amruka Branch Line

Other information
- Station code: BKK

Services
Preceding station	Pakistan Railways	Following station
Hasilpur towards Samasata Junction	Samasata–Amruka Branch Line	Chistian towards Amruka
Location

Bakhshan Khan Railway Station (Urdu: بخشن خان ریلوے اسٹیشن, Punjabi: بخشن خان ریلوے اسٹیشن) is located in Pakistan.

== See also ==
- List of railway stations in Pakistan
- Pakistan Railways
