= Tamewali railway station =

Railway station in Pakistan

Tamewali Railway Station ٹامے والی ریلوے اسٹیشن
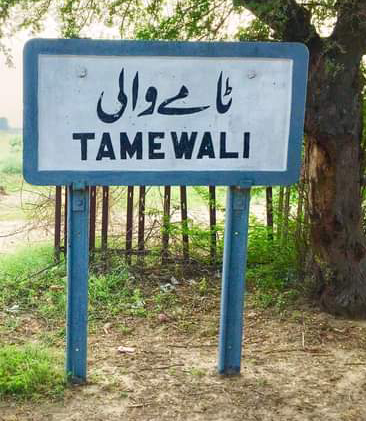

General information
- Coordinates: 29.563175°N 72.237371°E
- Owner: Ministry of Railways
- Line: Samasata–Amruka Branch Line

Other information
- Station code: TMW

Services
| Preceding station | Pakistan Railways | Following station |
|---|---|---|
| Asrani towards Samasata Junction | Samasata–Amruka Branch Line | Sheikh Wahan towards Amruka |
Location

Tamewali Railway Station (Urdu: ٹامے والی ریلوے اسٹیشن, Punjabi: ٹامے والی ریلوے اسٹیشن) is located in Pakistan along the Samasata-Amruka Branch Line.

== See also ==
- List of railway stations in Pakistan
- Pakistan Railways
