= Chistian railway station =

Railway station in Pakistan

Chistian Railway Station چشتیاں ریلوے اسٹیشن

General information
- Coordinates: 29.7998°N 72.8580°E
- Owner: Ministry of Railways
- Line: Samasata–Amruka Branch Line

Other information
- Station code: CSI

Services
Preceding station	Pakistan Railways	Following station
Bakhshan Khan towards Samasata Junction	Samasata–Amruka Branch Line	Madrisa towards Amruka
Location

Chistian Railway Station (Urdu: چشتیاں ریلوے اسٹیشن, Punjabi: چشتیاں ریلوے اسٹیشن) is located in Chistian, Punjab, Pakistan.

== See also ==
- List of railway stations in Pakistan
- Pakistan Railways
