= Kotla Pathan railway station =

Railway station in Pakistan

Coordinates: 28°43′N 70°36′E

Kotla Pathan Railway Station کوٹلہ پٹھان ریلوے اسٹیشن

General information
- Owner: Ministry of Railways
- Line: Khanpur–Chachran Railway

Other information
- Station code: KLF

Services
Preceding station	Pakistan Railways	Following station
Khanpur Terminus	Khanpur–Chachran Railway (defunct)	Jajja Abbasian towards Chachran
Location

Kotla Pathan Railway Station (Urdu: کوٹلہ پٹھان ریلوے اسٹیشن) is located in Pakistan.

== See also ==
- List of railway stations in Pakistan
- Pakistan Railways
