= Sobha Wala railway station =

Railway station in Pakistan

Sobha Wala Railway Station سوبھا والا ریلوے اسٹیشن

General information
- Coordinates: 30.2257°N 73.8285°E
- Owner: Ministry of Railways
- Line: Samasata–Amruka Branch Line

Other information
- Station code: SAX

Services
Preceding station	Pakistan Railways	Following station
Mandi Sadiq Ganj Junction towards Samasata Junction	Samasata–Amruka Branch Line	Amruka Terminus
Location

Sobha Wala Railway Station (Urdu: سوبھا والا ریلوے اسٹیشن, Punjabi: سوبھا والا ریلوے اسٹیشن) is located in Pakistan.

== See also ==
- List of railway stations in Pakistan
- Pakistan Railways
