= Zahir Pir railway station =

Railway station in Pakistan

Coordinates: 28°49′N 70°31′E

Zahir Pir Railway Station ظاہر پیر ریلوے اسٹیشن

General information
- Owner: Ministry of Railways
- Line: Khanpur–Chachran Railway

Other information
- Station code: ZRP

Services
Preceding station	Pakistan Railways	Following station
Jajja Abbasian towards Khanpur	Khanpur–Chachran Railway (defunct)	Chachran Terminus
Location

Zahir Pir Railway Station (Urdu: ظاہر پیر ریلوے اسٹیشن) was located in Pakistan.

== See also ==
- List of railway stations in Pakistan
- Pakistan Railways
