= Harunabad railway station =

Railway station in Pakistan

Harunabad Railway Station ہارون آباد ریلوے اسٹیشن

General information
- Coordinates: 29.6118°N 73.1332°E
- Owner: Ministry of Railways

Other information
- Station code: HRND

Services
Preceding station	Pakistan Railways	Following station
Bahawalnagar Junction Terminus	Bahawalnagar–Fort Abbas Branch Line	Faqirwali towards Fort Abbas
Location

Harunabad Railway Station (Urdu: ہارون آباد ریلوے اسٹیشن, Punjabi: ہارون آباد ریلوے اسٹیشن) is located in Pakistan.

== See also ==
- List of railway stations in Pakistan
- Pakistan Railways
