= SKZ =

SKZ may refer to:

== Arts and entertainment ==
- Stray Kids, a South Korean boy band commonly abbreviated to SKZ
- Saya e Khuda e Zuljalal, a 2016 Pakistani film
- Serbian Literary Guild (Serbian: Srpska književna zadruga), a writers' organisation and publishing house

== Transport ==
- Begum Nusrat Bhutto International Airport (IATA: SKZ), Pakistan
- Sheikh Wahan railway station (station code SKZ), Pakistan
- Skyway Enterprises (ICAO: SKZ), an American airline

== Other ==
- Sekar language (ISO 639-3: skz), an Austronesian language of West Papua
- Shapur I's inscription at the Ka'ba-ye Zartosht, a 3rd-century Sasanian inscription
- Slovenian Peasant Union (Slovene: Slovenska kmečka zveza), a political party
