= Mandi Sadiq Ganj Junction railway station =

Railway station in Pakistan

Mandi Sadiq Ganj Junction Station منڈی صادق گنج جنکشن ریلوے اسٹیشن
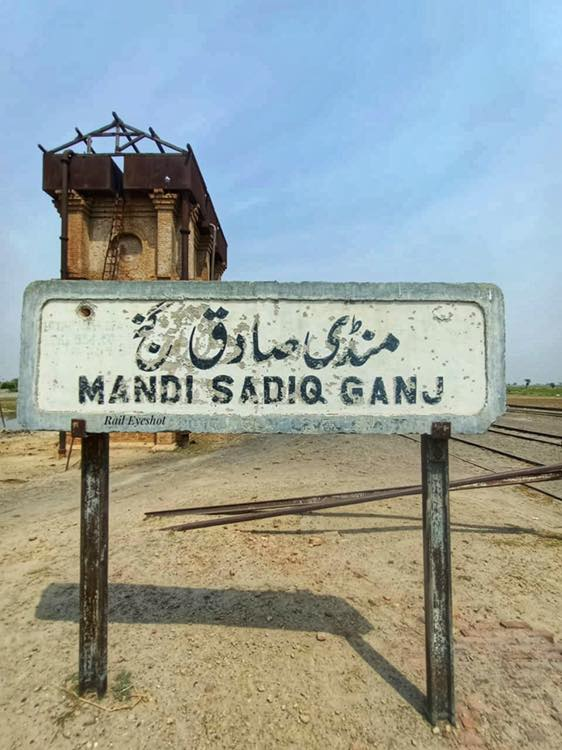

General information
- Coordinates: 30.1536°N 73.7386°E
- Owner: Ministry of Railways
- Line: Samasata–Amruka Branch Line

Other information
- Station code: MSQJ

Services
Preceding station	Pakistan Railways	Following station
Minchinabad towards Samasata Junction	Samasata–Amruka Branch Line	Sobha Wala towards Amruka
Location

Mandi Sadiq Ganj Junction Railway Station (Urdu: منڈی صادق گنج جنکشن ریلوے اسٹیشن) is located in Pakistan. Before partition, it was a junction station connecting the Karachi station via Minchinabad, Bahawal nagar and Samsatta jn.on one side and Delhi and Ambala on other side.

The important stations on Delhi side were:

Sobhawali, Amruka, Chananwali, Fazilka, Lakhewali, Kotkapura, Bhatinda, Jakhal, Narwana Jind, Rohtak and Delhi.

The important stations on Ambala side were:

Hindumal kot, Panjkosi, Abohar, Malout, Gidderbaha, Bhatinda, Dhuri, Patiala, Rajpura Ambala city and Ambala Cantt.

As Ambala Cantt was further connected to Delhi via Saharanpur ana Meerut, there was dual connectivity to this junction.

== Gallery ==
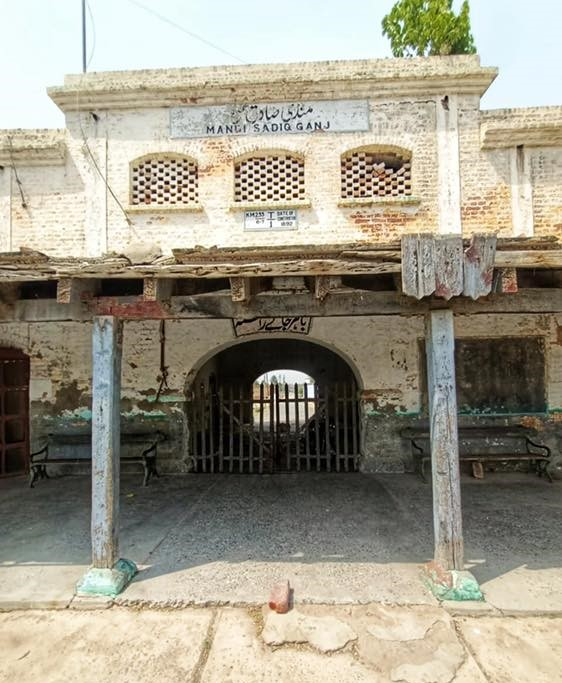

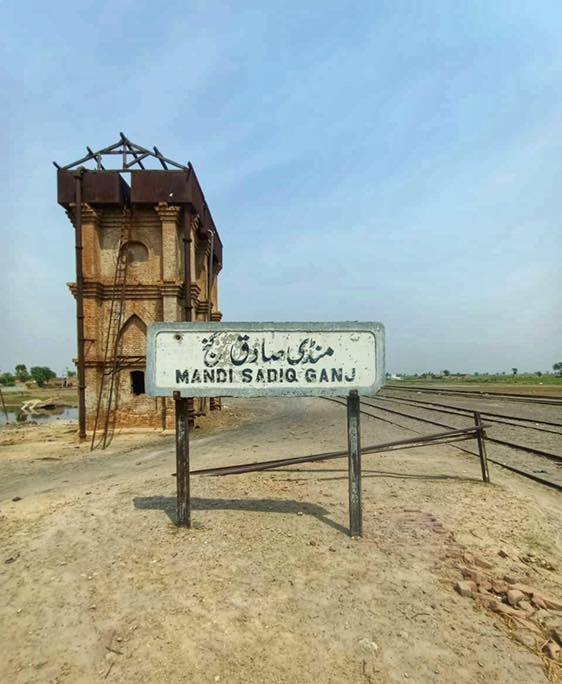

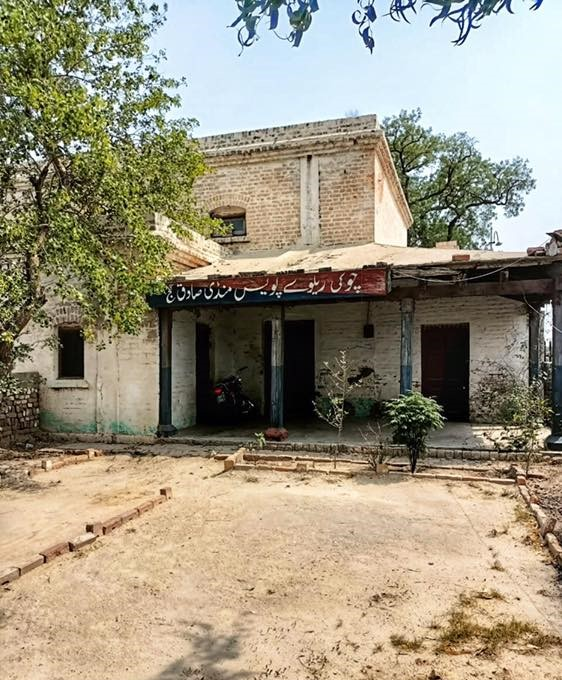

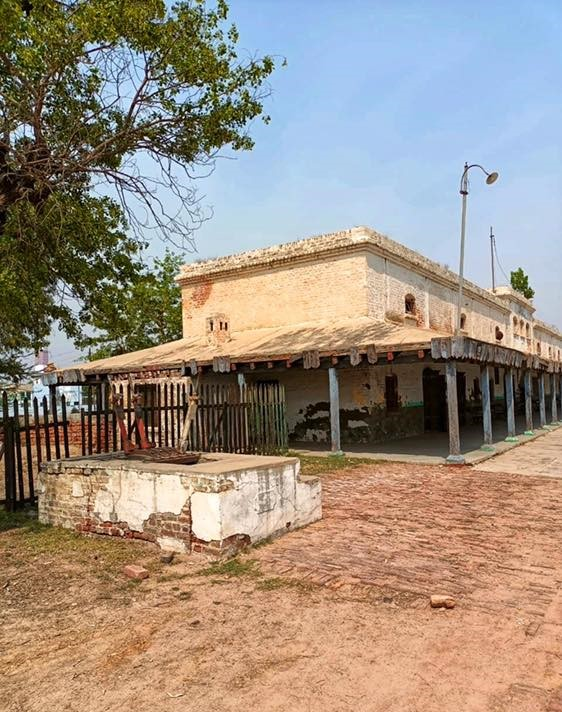

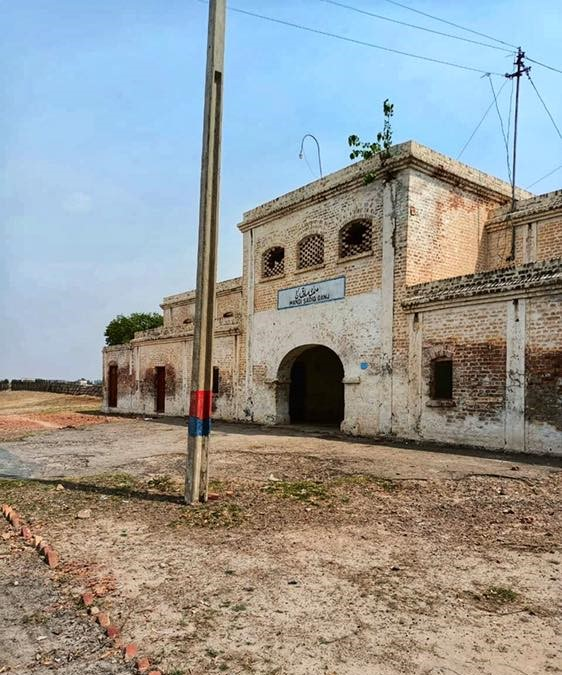

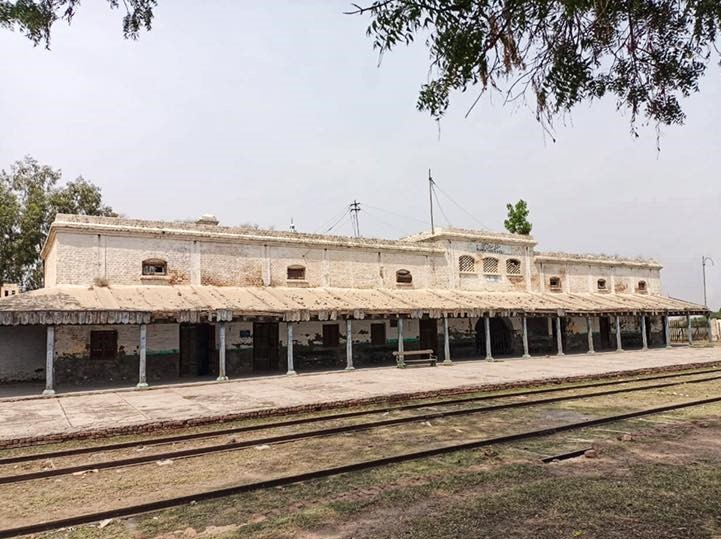

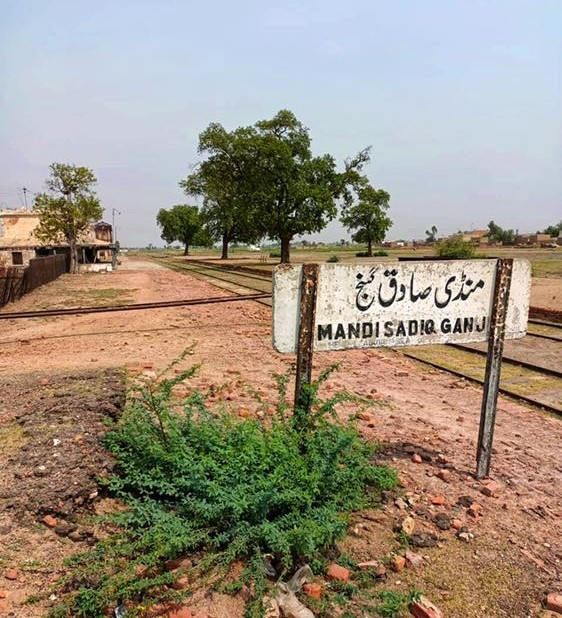

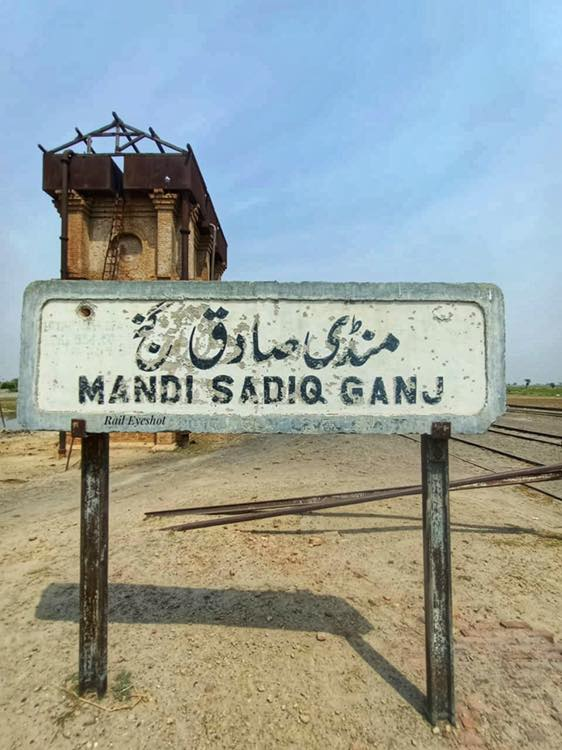

== See also ==
- List of railway stations in Pakistan
- Pakistan Railways
