= Sheikh Wahan railway station =

Railway station in Pakistan

Sheikh Wahan Station شیخ وہن ریلوے اسٹیشن

General information
- Coordinates: 29.6322°N 72.3953°E
- Owner: Ministry of Railways
- Line: Samasata–Amruka Branch Line

Other information
- Station code: SKZ

Services
| Preceding station | Pakistan Railways | Following station |
|---|---|---|
| Tamewali towards Samasata Junction | Samasata–Amruka Branch Line | Hasilpur towards Amruka |
Location

Sheikh Wahan Railway Station (Urdu: شیخ وہن ریلوے اسٹیشن, Punjabi: شیخ وہن ریلوے اسٹیشن) is located in Pakistan.

== See also ==
- List of railway stations in Pakistan
- Pakistan Railways
