= Faqirwali railway station =

Railway station in Pakistan

Faqirwali Railway Station فقیر والی ریلوے اسٹیشن
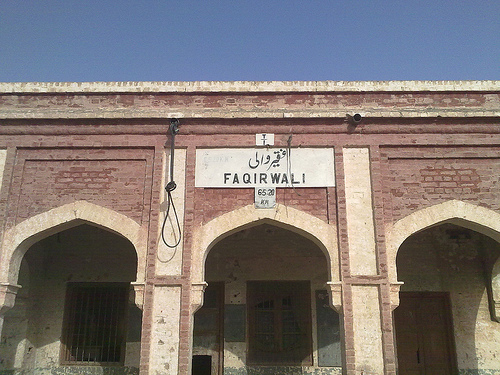

General information
- Location: Faqirwali; Bahawalnagar District, Punjab, Pakistan
- Owner: Ministry of Railways

Other information
- Status: Closed
- Station code: FQL

Services
Preceding station	Pakistan Railways	Following station
Harunabad towards Bahawalnagar Junction	Bahawalnagar–Fort Abbas Branch Line	Fort Abbas Terminus
Location

Faqirwali Railway Station (Urdu: فقیر والی ریلوے اسٹیشن, Punjabi: فقیر والی ریلوے اسٹیشن) is located in Pakistan.

== See also ==
- List of railway stations in Pakistan
- Pakistan Railways
