= Abbasnagar railway station =

Railway station in Pakistan

Abbasnagar Railway Station عباس نگر ریلوے اسٹیشن

General information
- Coordinates: 29°26′03″N 71°54′25″E
- Owner: Ministry of Railways
- Line: Samasata–Amruka Branch Line

Other information
- Station code: ABNR

Services
Preceding station	Pakistan Railways	Following station
Baghdad towards Samasata Junction	Samasata–Amruka Branch Line	Lal Suhanra towards Amruka
Location
- Location within Pakistan

Abbasnagar Railway Station (Urdu: عباس نگر ریلوے اسٹیشن) is located in Pakistan.

== See also ==
- List of railway stations in Pakistan
- Pakistan Railways
