= Chabiana railway station =

Railway station in Pakistan

Chabiana Station چبیانہ اسٹیشن

General information
- Coordinates: 30°05′20″N 73°28′35″E
- Owner: Ministry of Railways
- Line: Samasata–Amruka Branch Line

Other information
- Station code: CBA
Location

Chabiana railway station (Urdu: چبیانہ ریلوے اسٹیشن) is a railway station located in Pakistan.

== See also ==
- List of railway stations in Pakistan
- Pakistan Railways
