= Amruka =

امرُوکا
- Town
- Amruka
- Location within Pakistan
- Coordinates: 30.320870°N 73.878412°E
- Country: Pakistan
- Province: Punjab
- District: Bahawalnagar
- Tehsil: Minchinabad
- Elevation: 252 m (827 ft)
- Time zone: UTC+5 (PST)

Amruka (Urdu: امرُوکا), is a town in Minchinabad tehsil, Bahawalnagar district of Punjab province of the Pakistan. It is located near Pakistan-India border.
