= Panjnad River =

River in Punjab, Pakistan

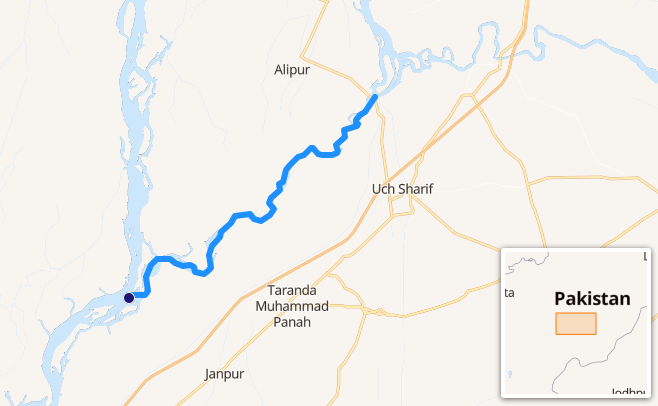
- Path of the Panjnad

Physical characteristics
- Mouth: Indus River
  - location: Mithankot
  - coordinates: 28°56′59.99″N 70°29′59.99″E
- Length: 71 km (44 mi)
- Basin size: 395,000 km^{2} (153,000 mi^{2})
- Discharge
  - location: Mithankot (near mouth)
  - average: 2,500 m^{3}/s (88,000 cu ft/s)

Basin features
- Progression: Indus→ Arabian Sea
- Tributaries
  - left: Chenab
  - right: Sutlej

The Panjnad River is a river at the extreme end of the Bahawalpur district in the Punjab province of Pakistan. The name Panjnad is derived from Persian panj ("five") and Sanskrit nadī́ ("river") which means "five rivers". The Panjnad River is formed by the successive confluence or merger of the five main rivers of Punjab: the Jhelum, Chenab, Ravi, Beas and Sutlej.

The Jhelum and the Ravi rivers join the Chenab River; the Beas River joins the Sutlej River; and the Sutlej and the Chenab rivers join to form the Panjnad River. It is 16 kilometres north of Uch Sharif in the Muzaffar Garh district. The combined stream runs southwest for approximately 70.8 kilometres and joins the Indus River at Mithankot. The Indus eventually drains into the Arabian Sea. A barrage on Panjnad has been erected which provides irrigation channels for Punjab and Sindh provinces south of the Sutlej River and east of the Indus River.

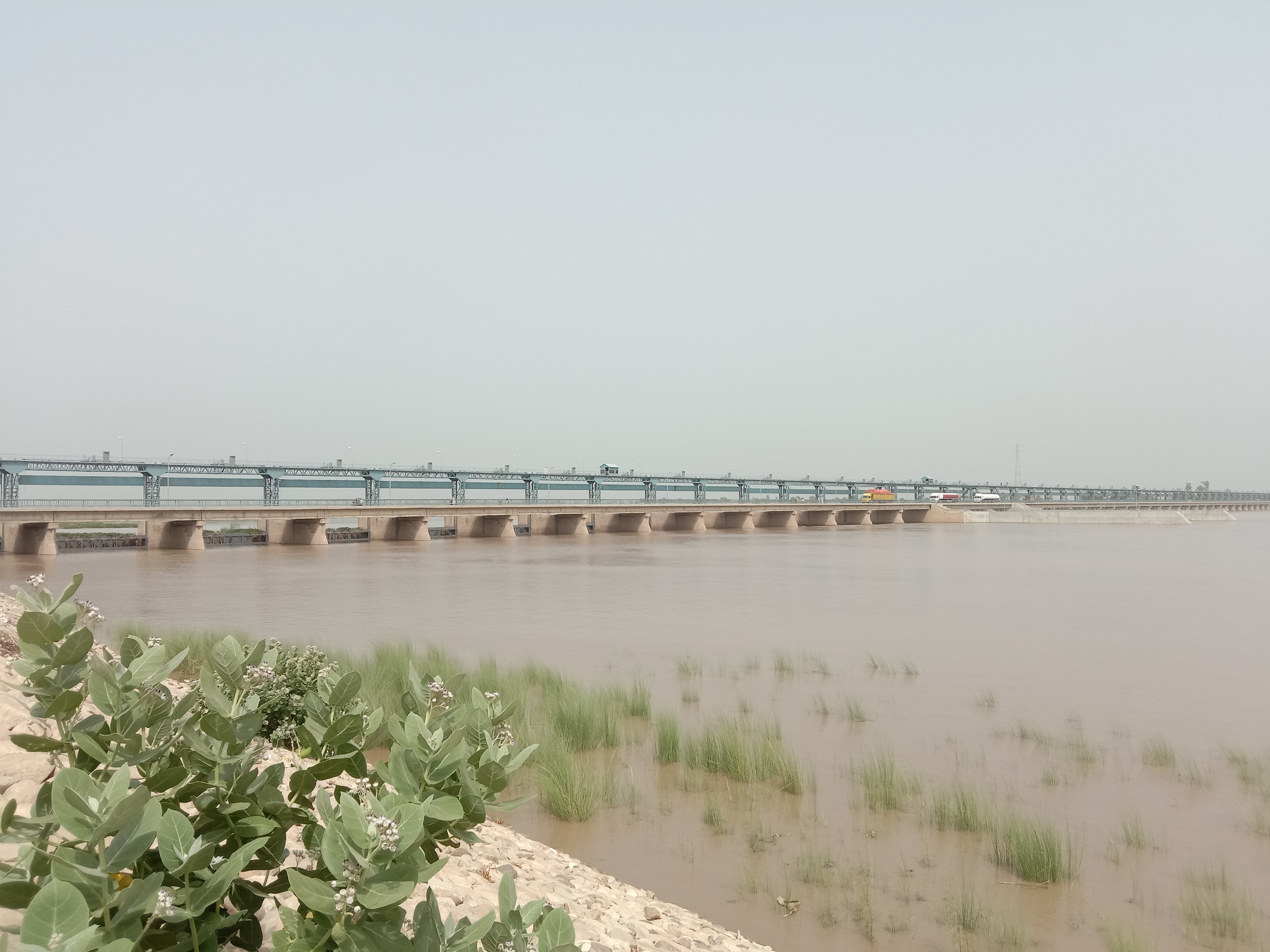
Head Panjnad Bridge
