= Qaimpur =

- City
- Location within Pakistan
- Coordinates: 28.5268°N 70.3403°E
- Country: Pakistan
- Province: Punjab
- Time zone: UTC+5 (PTK)
- Postal code: 63040

Qaimpur is a city in Punjab, Pakistan It comes under the Hasilpur Tehsil administrative division of the Bahawalpur District. Qaimpur was once an important ancient route in Mughal and Abbasi era. It is a small town with population of around 20,000.

The town is located on the main highway between Hasilpur and Bahawalpur; it is 80 km far away from Bahawalpur

It is located at 28.5268 N, 70.3403 E, and sits at an altitude of 79m.

== See also ==
- Qaimpur railway station
- Hasilpur
- Sadiq Public School
- Bahawalpur District
