= Sutlej =

River in Asia

Satluj
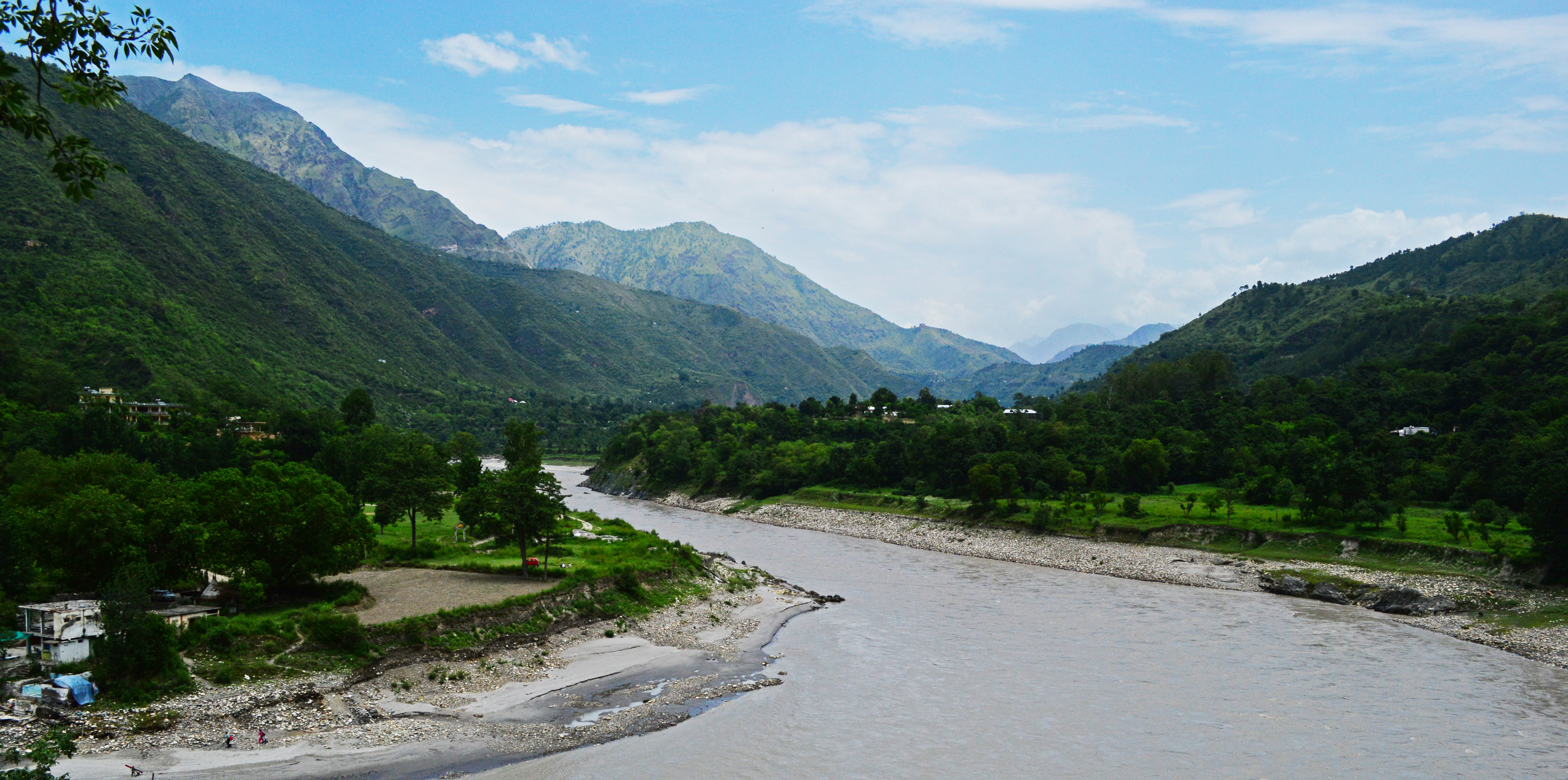
- View of Satluj River

Location
- Country: China, India, Pakistan
- State: Tibet, Himachal Pradesh, Punjab (India), Punjab (Pakistan)
- Cities: Kalpa, Rupnagar, Kiratpur Sahib, Ludhiana, Vehari, Jallah Jeem, Bahawalpur

Physical characteristics
- Source: Manasarovar-Rakas Lakes
  - location: Tibet, China
  - coordinates: 30°21′52.1″N 81°59′39.9″E
  - elevation: 4,575 m (15,010 ft)
- Mouth: Confluence with Chenab to form the Panjnad River
  - location: Near Khairpur, Bahawalpur district, Punjab, Pakistan
  - coordinates: 29°23′23″N 71°3′42″E
  - elevation: 102 m (335 ft)
- Length: 1,450 km (900 mi)approx.
- Basin size: 395,000 km^{2} (153,000 sq mi)approx.
- Discharge
  - location: Ropar
  - average: 500 m^{3}/s (18,000 cu ft/s)
- Discharge
  - location: Panjnad, Confluence of Chenab (71 km upstream of mouth)
  - average: 2,946.66 m^{3}/s (104,060 cu ft/s) 63.613 km^{3}/a (2,015.8 m^{3}/s)

Basin features
- Tributaries
  - left: Baspa
  - right: Spiti, Beas, Chenab

The Sutlej River (Note: Punjabi pronunciation: [sət̪ᵊˈlʊd͡ʒᵊ]) or the Satluj River is a major river in Asia, flowing through China, India and Pakistan, and is the longest of the five major rivers of the Punjab region. It is also known as Satadru; and is the easternmost tributary of the Indus River. The combination of the Sutlej and Chenab rivers in the plains of Punjab forms the Panjnad, which finally flows into the Indus River at Mithankot.

In India, the Bhakra Dam is built on the Sutlej River to provide irrigation and other facilities to the states of Punjab, Rajasthan and Haryana.

The waters of the Sutlej are allocated to India under the Indus Waters Treaty between India and Pakistan, and are mostly diverted to irrigation canals in India like the Sirhind Canal, Bhakra Main Line and the Rajasthan canal. The mean annual flow is 14 million acre feet (MAF) (roughly 1.727 × 10^{13} L) upstream of Ropar barrage, downstream of the Bhakra dam. It has several major hydroelectric points, including the 1,325 MW Bhakra Dam, the 1,000 MW Karcham Wangtoo Hydroelectric Plant, and the 1,500 MW Nathpa Jhakri Dam. The drainage basin in India includes the states and union territories of Himachal Pradesh, Punjab, Ladakh and Haryana.

== Background ==
=== Etymology ===
Earlier the river was also called Shutudri or Zaradros river, a name which was mentioned in the Hindu texts. Shutudri was its Sanskrit name. In the Chaitra-Ratha Parva of Adi Parva of Mahābhārata, when sage Vasishtha wanted to commit suicide he saw the river named Haimāvata (whose source is Himavat), flooded and full of crocodiles and other aquatic monsters. So he jumped into the river. The river thinking that Vasishtha was a mass of unquenchable fire dilated itself and flew in a hundred different directions. Henceforth the river was named śatadra (or śatadru) which means the river of a hundred courses. So, Vasishtha landed on dry land and was unharmed.

=== History ===
The Upper Sutlej Valley, called Langqên Zangbo in Tibet, was once known as the Garuda Valley by the Zhangzhung, the ancient civilization of western Tibet. The Garuda Valley was the centre of their empire, which stretched many miles into the nearby Himalayas. The Zhangzhung built a towering palace in the Upper Sutlej Valley called Kyunglung, the ruins of which still exist today near the village of Moincêr, southwest of Mount Kailash (Mount Ti-se). Eventually, the Zhangzhung were conquered by the Tibetan Empire. The Sutlej River also formed the eastern boundary of the Sikh Empire under Maharajah Ranjit Singh.

Today, the Sutlej Valley is inhabited by nomadic descendants of the Zhangzhung, who live in tiny villages of yak herders.

The Sutlej was the main medium of transportation for the kings of that time. In the early 18th century, it was used to transport devdar woods for Bilaspur district, Hamirpur district, and other places along the Sutlej's banks.

Of four rivers (Indus, Sutlej, Brahmaputra and Karnali/Ganges) mythically flowing out of holy Lake Manasarovar, the Sutlej is actually connected to the Lake Manasarovar by channels that are dry most of the time.

== Course ==
=== Present course ===
The river originates from Langchen Kabab in the Tibetan plateau, at the lakes of Manasarovar and Rakshastal at the southern slope of Mount Kailash, which is about 4,570 metres above sea-level. It is fed from snow and glaciers. The source of the Sutlej is west of the catchment area of Lake Rakshastal in Tibet (also called La'angcuo, adjacent to lake Manasarovar), as springs in an ephemeral stream. Lake Rakshastal used to be part of the Sutlej river basin long ago and separated from the Sutlej due to tectonic activity. The nascent river flows at first west-northwest for about 260 kilometres (160 mi) under the Tibetan name Langqên Zangbo (Elephant River or Elephant Spring) through the Tibetan province of Nari-Khorsam to the Shipki La pass, entering India in Himachal Pradesh state at Khab. It flows in a northwestern direction until it changes its course toward the southwest. Ungti Chu and Pare Chu rivers which drain the southeastern part of Ladakh are tributaries of Sutlej river. Eventually, it reaches the Bhakra gorge, where the Bhakra/Govind Sagar gravity-dam has been constructed. At this point, the lower catchment drains into the reservoire while the higher slopes drains via tributaries. Some of the principal tributaries are Soel khad, Alseed khad, Ali khad, Gamrola khad, Ghambar khad, Seer khad, Sukhar khad, Sarhali khad, and Lunkar khad. Located near Nangal Town, the Sutlej enters the Anandpur Dun, which is a valley/plain region situated between the outer Himalayas and Shivalik Hills. Within the valley, the Soan Nadi runs near the Sutlej and merges with it at the southern part of the valley at the left bak (eastern bank). Within the valley, the river travels with its tributaries in a braided course in a sluggish manner, with the seasonal torrents being referred to as Khads, that descend down from the surrounding hills from slopes leading toward the river. The principal khads in this section are the Donala Khad, Dabawali Khad, Charan Ganga Khad, Lohand Khad, and Kundlu Ki Khad.

The Sutlej exits the valley near Ropar, where it enters the Punjab Plains. In the past, there was a weir that diverted some of its water to the Sirhind Canal at this point but in the 1950s it was replaced with a barrage of the Bhakra-Nangal project. The Bist Doab Canal is also fed by the river here and emerges from its right-bank. It then has its main knee heading west-southwest for about 360 kilometres (220 mi) to meet the Beas River near Harike, Tarn Taran district, Punjab state. Ropar Wetland in Punjab state is located on the Sutlej river basin. Evidence suggests Indus Valley Civilisation also flourished here. Between the river's course from Ropar and Firozpur, many natural streams and artificial drains feed. At Khizarpur village, the Siswan Nadi, a seasonal stream, feed the Sutlej. Under the high-bank of the old course of the Sutlej emerges the Buddha Nullah, where is a perennial stream that originates at Chamkaur and enters Ludhiana district near Bahlopur, passing nearby the city of Ludhiana, re-entering the Sutlej at Jagraon Tehsil, near the district boundary with the neighbouring Firozpur district. The East Beas and West Beas enters the Sutlej on its right bank, with the Beas itself joining the Sutlej at Harike.

Continuing west-southwest, the Sutlej enters Pakistan about 15 kilometres (9.3 mi) east of Bhedian Kalan, Kasur District, Punjab province, continuing southwest to water the ancient and historical former Bahawalpur princely state.

About 17 kilometres (11 mi) north of Uch Sharif, the Sutlej unites with the Chenab River, forming the Panjnad River, which finally flows into the Indus river about 100 kilometres (62 mi) west of the city of Bahawalpur. The area to the southeast on the Pakistani side of the Pakistan-India border is called the Cholistan Desert and, on the Indian side, the Thar Desert.

The Indus then flows through a gorge near Sukkur and the fertile plains region of Sindh, forming a large delta region between the border of Gujarat, India and Pakistan, finally terminating in the Arabian Sea near the port city of Karachi, Pakistan. During floods, Indus river water flows into the Indian part of the Great Rann of Kutch. Thus Gujarat state of India is also a riparian state of the Indus river as the Rann of Kutch area lying west of Kori Creek in the state is part of the Indus River Delta.

=== Historical course ===
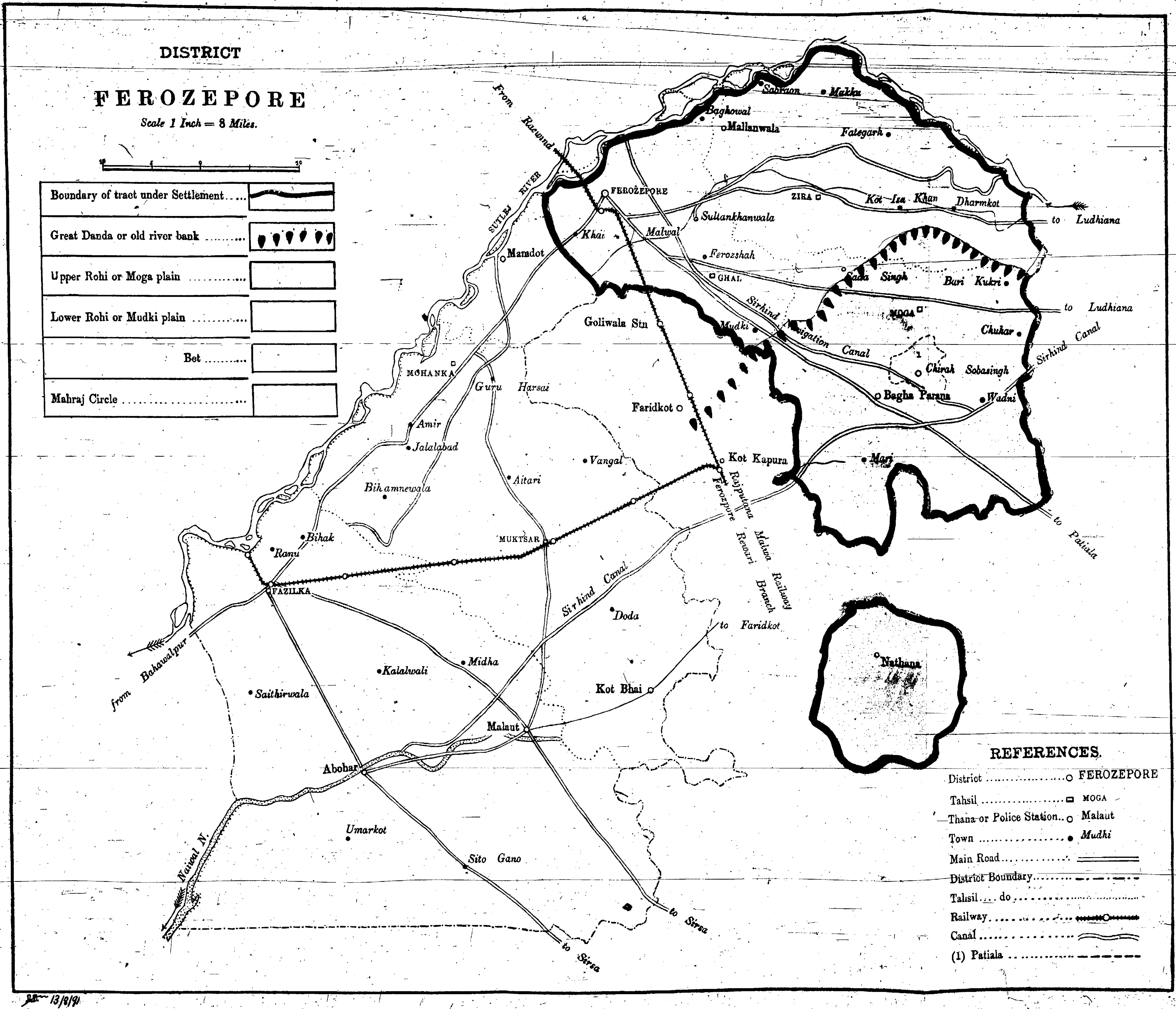
Map of Ferozepore district, 13 July 1891. The old bank of the Sutlej River is marked.

Prior to the 11th century, the Sutlej River actually did not connect with the Indus River but rather flowed into the Hakra or Ghaggar River in Bikaner using one or more old channels. Some of these old channels were the Sirhind channel, between Sirsa and Bhatnair, and from Sirsa back to Tohana and Ropar. There were also the three Naiwals. A few centuries ago, the Sutlej River merged with the Ghaggar River to discharge in to the Arabian Sea. In approx. 1797 BC, the course of the Sutlej River moved towards the north to join the Beas River. By 1750–1800, the Sutlej river absorbed the old bed of the Beas which ran through the high-bar of the Bari Doab. From 1882–1903, the Sutlej shifted northward in the Ludhiana district of a distance of 1.6 km at different points within Ludhiana Tehsil and Samrala Tehsil, while it shifted around a mile northward in Jagraon Tehsil. After a large amount of snowfall in 1988 in Bhakra, there was flooding downstream, which caused a shift in the course of the Sutlej. In modern-times, reports of the river shifting up to 3 km at various points in Punjab, most principally at Phillaur, Noormahal, and Nakodar. Sand-mining is a possible cause for some of the recent shifts in the river's course.

== Geology ==
Sutlej is an antecedent river, which existed before the Himalayas and entrenched itself while they were rising. The Sutlej, along with all of the Punjab rivers, is thought to have drained east into the Ganges prior to 5 mya.

There is substantial geologic evidence to indicate that prior to 1700 BC, and perhaps much earlier, the Sutlej was an important tributary of the Ghaggar-Hakra River (thought to be the legendary Sarasvati River) rather than the Indus, with various authors putting the redirection from 2500 to 2000 BC, from 5000 to 3000 BC, or before 8000 BC. Geologists believe that tectonic activity created elevation changes which redirected the flow of Sutlej from the southeast to the southwest. If the diversion of the river occurred recently (about 4000 years ago), it may have been responsible for the Ghaggar-Hakra (Saraswati) drying up, causing desertification of Cholistan and the eastern part of the modern state of Sindh, and the abandonment of Harappan settlements along the Ghaggar. However, the Sutlej may have already been captured by the Indus thousands of years earlier.

There is some evidence that the high rate of erosion caused by the modern Sutlej River has influenced the local faulting and rapidly exhumed rocks above Rampur. This would be similar to, but on a much smaller scale than, the exhumation of rocks by the Indus River in Nanga Parbat, Pakistan. The Sutlej River also exposes a double inverted metamorphic gradient.

== Infrastructure ==
=== Dams ===
Major dams and hydroelectric powerplants are as follows, from upstream to downstream:

==== India ====
- Karcham Wangtoo Hydroelectric Plant, 1,000 MW, no MCM as it is run-of-the-river project in Kinnaur district of Himachal Pradesh, was completed in 2011.
- Nathpa Jhakri Dam, 1,500 MW, no MCM as it is run-of-the-river project in Kinnaur district of Himachal Pradesh was completed in 2004.
- Koldam Dam, 800 MW, in Bilaspur district of Himachal Pradesh was completed in 2015.
- Bhakra Dam 1,325 MW, 9621 MCM, in Bilaspur district of Himachal Pradesh, is the third largest reservoir in India, the first being Indira Sagar dam in Madhya Pradesh with capacity of 12.22 billion cubic meters and the second being Nagarjunasagar Dam in Telangana.

==== Pakistan ====
- Sulemanki Headworks, in Bahawalnagar District of Punjab, completed in 1927. It was an irrigation scheme to develop the neighbouring areas.
- Islam Headworks, in Bahawalpur district of Punjab, completed in 1927.

=== Sutlej-Yamuna Link ===
There has been a proposal to build a 214-kilometre (133 mi) long heavy freight and irrigation canal, to be known as the Sutlej-Yamuna Link (SYL) to connect the Sutlej and Yamuna rivers. The project is intended to connect the Ganges, which flows to the east coast of the subcontinent, with points west, via Pakistan. When completed, the SYL would enable inland shipping from India's east coast to its west coast (on the Arabian sea) without having to round the southern tip of India by sea, vastly shortening shipping distances, alleviating pressures on seaports, avoiding sea hazards, creating business opportunities along the route, raising real estate values, raising tax revenue, and establishing important commercial links and providing jobs for north-central India's large population. However, the proposal has met with obstacles and has been referred to the Supreme Court of India. To augment nearly 100 tmcft (some 2.832 trillion L) water availability for the needs of this link canal, Tso Moriri lake/Lingdi Nadi (a tributary of Tso Moriri lake) waters can be diverted to the Sutlej basin by digging a 10 km long gravity canal to connect to the Ungti Chu river.

== Gallery ==
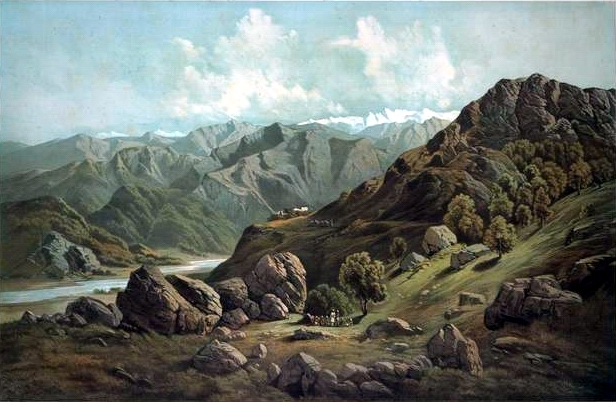
Sutlej Valley from Rampur c. 1857

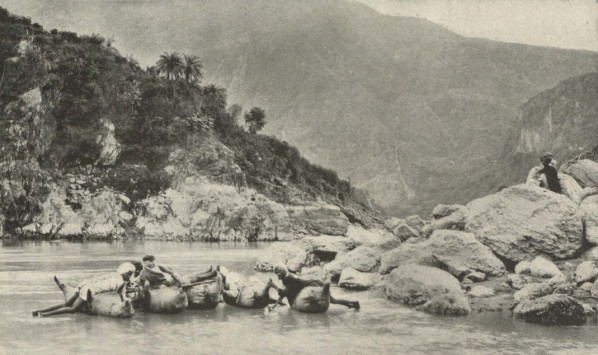
Using inflated animal skins to cross the Sutlej River, c. 1905

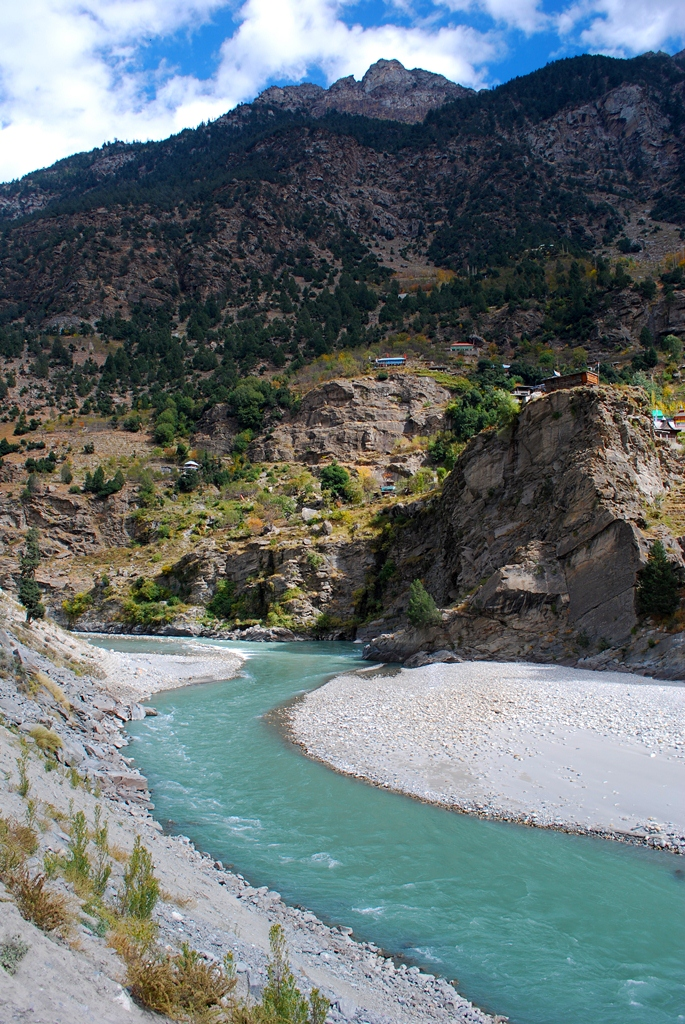
Sutlej River in Kinnaur Valley, Himachal Pradesh, India

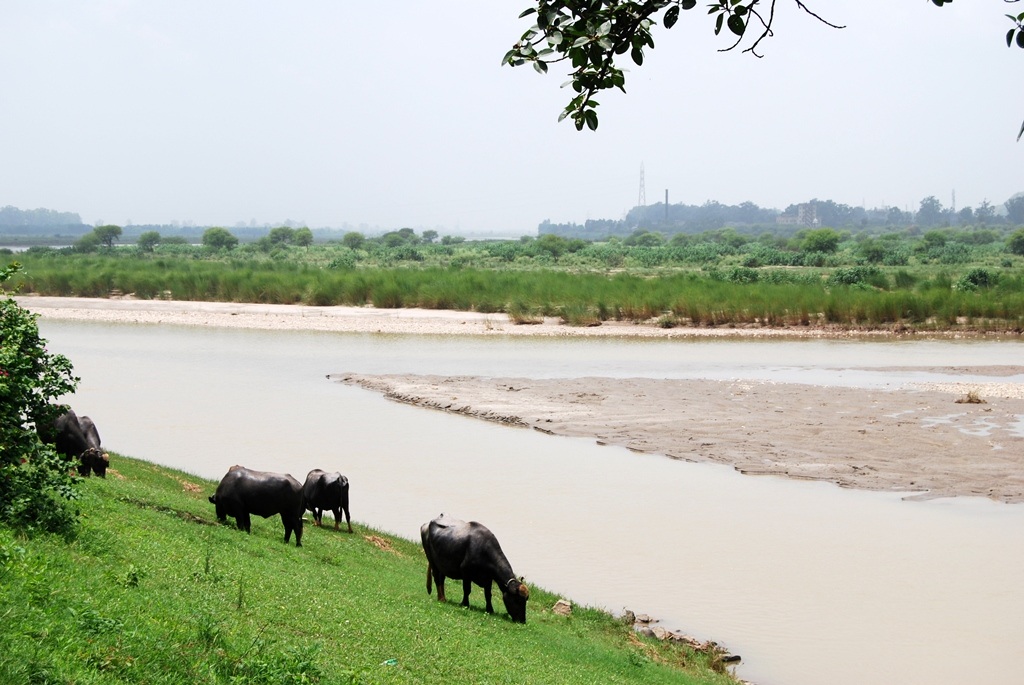
Cattle grazing on the banks of the river in Rupnagar, Punjab, India

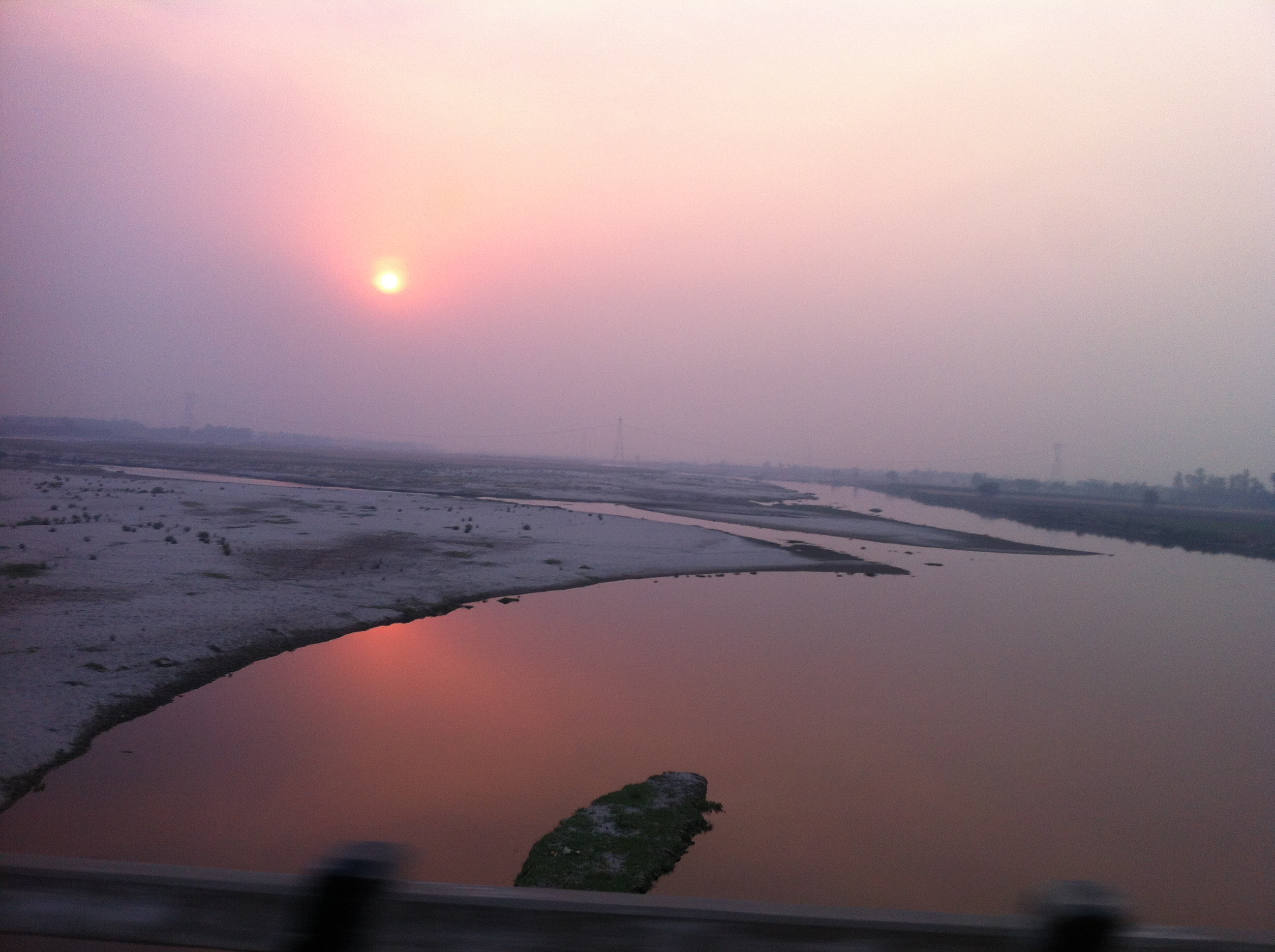
Satluj River near Shahkot, Punjab, India

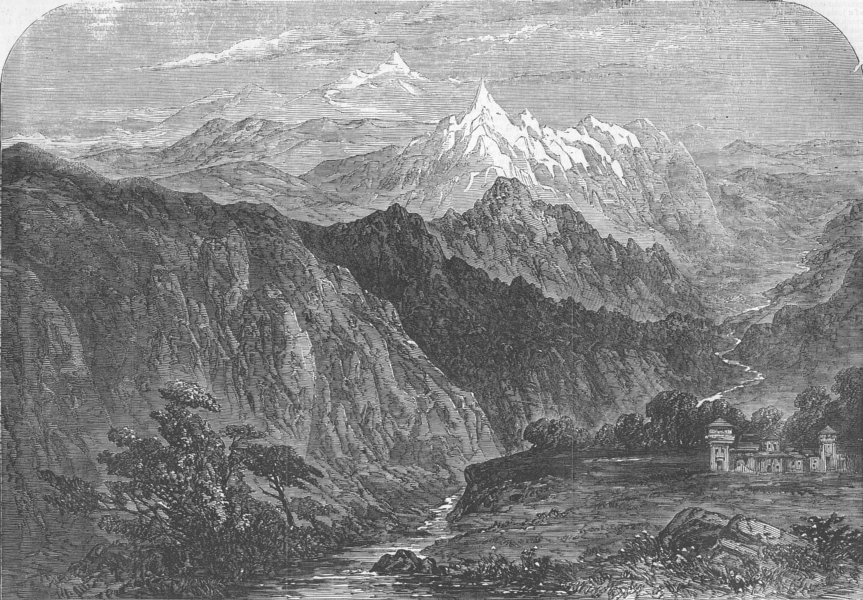
Sutlej entering India from Tibet near Shipki La, c. 1856

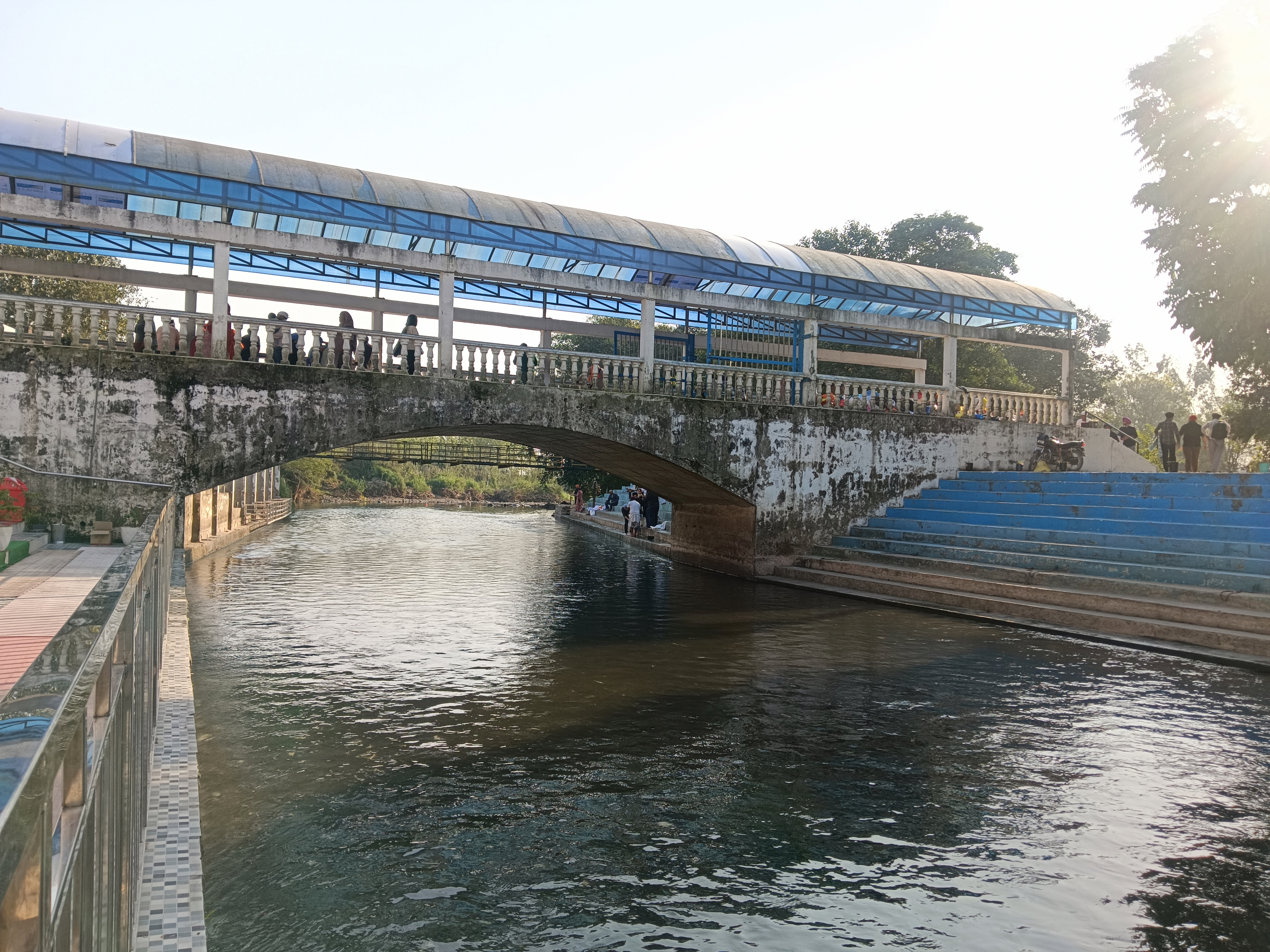
The Sutlej river flowing at Gurdwara Patalpuri Sahib, Kiratpur Sahib, Punjab

== See also ==
- List of rivers of India
- List of rivers of Pakistan
- Rivers of Jammu and Kashmir
