= Khanpur Katora railway station =

Railway station in Pakistan

Khanpur Katora Junction Railway Station خانپور کٹورا ریلوے اسٹیشن

General information
- Location: Railway Road, Khanpur Katora, Punjab 65070
- Coordinates: 28.6399°N 70.6495°E
- Owner: Ministry of Railways
- Lines: Karachi–Peshawar Railway Line; Khanpur–Chachran Railway

Other information
- Station code: KPR

History
- Opened: 1908

Services
Preceding station	Pakistan Railways	Following station
Sahja towards Kiamari	Karachi–Peshawar Line	Jhetha Bhutta towards Peshawar Cantonment
Terminus	Khanpur–Chachran Railway (defunct)	Kotla Pathan towards Chachran
Location
- Location within Pakistan

Khanpur Katora Railway Station (Urdu: خانپور کٹورا ریلوے اسٹیشن) is located in Khanpur Katora city, Rahim Yar Khan district of Punjab province of Pakistan. It is a major railway station of Pakistan Railways on the Karachi-Peshawar main line.

The station is staffed and has advance and current reservation offices. Food stalls are located on its platforms.

== History ==
Khanpur Katora railway station was once a major railway station used for changing crews, watering coaches, and switching locomotives after long hauls, It was once the Karachi Express' only stop between Lahore and Karachi.

Within the Gora Qabristan located near the Khanpur railway station, there still remain some graves of the British engineers—and their families—who laid the railway lines in the area. The railway track from Khanpur to Chachran was laid in 1905, after which the city was granted the status of a junction. This railway station was established in 1908.

=== Chachran Railway ===
The branch line was initially referred to as the Bahawalpur Royal Railway and was a Darbar line financed by the Princely Bahawalpur State. The line opened in 1911 as part of the North Western State Railway network. The line was owned by Bahawalpur State Darbar, who also owned the Bahawalnagar–Fort Abbas Railway. Following Pakistan's independence, the line became part of the Pakistan Railways network. The line linked Khanpur Katora and Chachran. However, with the decline of Pakistan Railways in the late 90s the section was abandoned and eventually the track was uprooted by authorities. Platforms 4 and 5 were used for services towards Chachran.

=== Old Railway Yard ===
When the station was built in 1870, the yard was much bigger and was expanded beside the current yard with lines near the PR Drivers Running Room. Due to dwindling freight in the late 1950s and 1960s the yard was shrunk to 4 lines, still in running condition as of 2025.

=== Originating Services ===
==== Rohi Express ====
Rohi Express was the oldest service originating from Khanpur Katora Junction between Khanpur Katora to Rawalpindi. It was suspended in 2007 after the assassination of Benazir Bhutto. It was not restarted due to shortage of locomotives and coaches. However the service was restored by Shaikh Rasheed in 2019 with a new route from Khanpur Katora to Rohri via Rahim Yar Khan. It originated from platform no 3 and HGMU-30 was used to haul the train, but the service was again terminated in 2020 due to the COVID-19 pandemic.

==== Rohri Express ====
Rohri Express was the original service that ran from Khanpur Katora to Rawalpindi.

== Locoshed ==
As a major station and junction, Khanpur Katora has a locoshed, However only two lines of locoshed were in working condition as of 2025. The Khanpur Katora locoshed is capable of holding Pakistan Railways locomotives such as RGE-24 and GMU-30. A working turntable is available at the rear of the locoshed.

== Routes ==
The routes from Khanpur Katora are linked to Karachi, Lahore, Rawalpindi, Peshawar, Quetta, Multan, Faisalabad, Sargodha, Sialkot, Gujranwala, Hyderabad, Sukkur, Jhang, Rahim Yar Khan, Nawabshah, Bahawalpur, Attock, Sibi, Khanewal, Gujrat, Rohri, Jacobabad, and Nowshera.

== See also ==
- List of railway stations in Pakistan
- Pakistan Railways
