= Baghdad railway station =

Railway station in Pakistan

Baghdad Railway Station بغداد ریلوے اسٹیشن

General information
- Location: Bahawalpur; Pakistan
- Coordinates: 29.3771°N 71.7263°E
- System: Railway Station
- Owner: Ministry of Railways
- Line: Samasata–Amruka Branch Line
- Platforms: 1
- Tracks: (Single track)

Other information
- Station code: BGHD

History
- Opened: 1895

Services
Preceding station	Pakistan Railways	Following station
Samasata Junction Terminus	Samasata–Amruka Branch Line	Abbasnagar towards Amruka
Location
- Location within Pakistan Location within Punjab, Pakistan

Baghdad Railway Station (Urdu: بغداد ریلوے اسٹیشن) is a railway station located on Hasilpur road Bahawalpur Pakistan at the elevation of 393 feet from sea level.

== History ==
It was established in 1835.

== See also ==
- List of railway stations in Pakistan
- Pakistan Railways
