= Khwaja Ghulam Farid =

19th-century Sufi poet (c. 1845–1901)

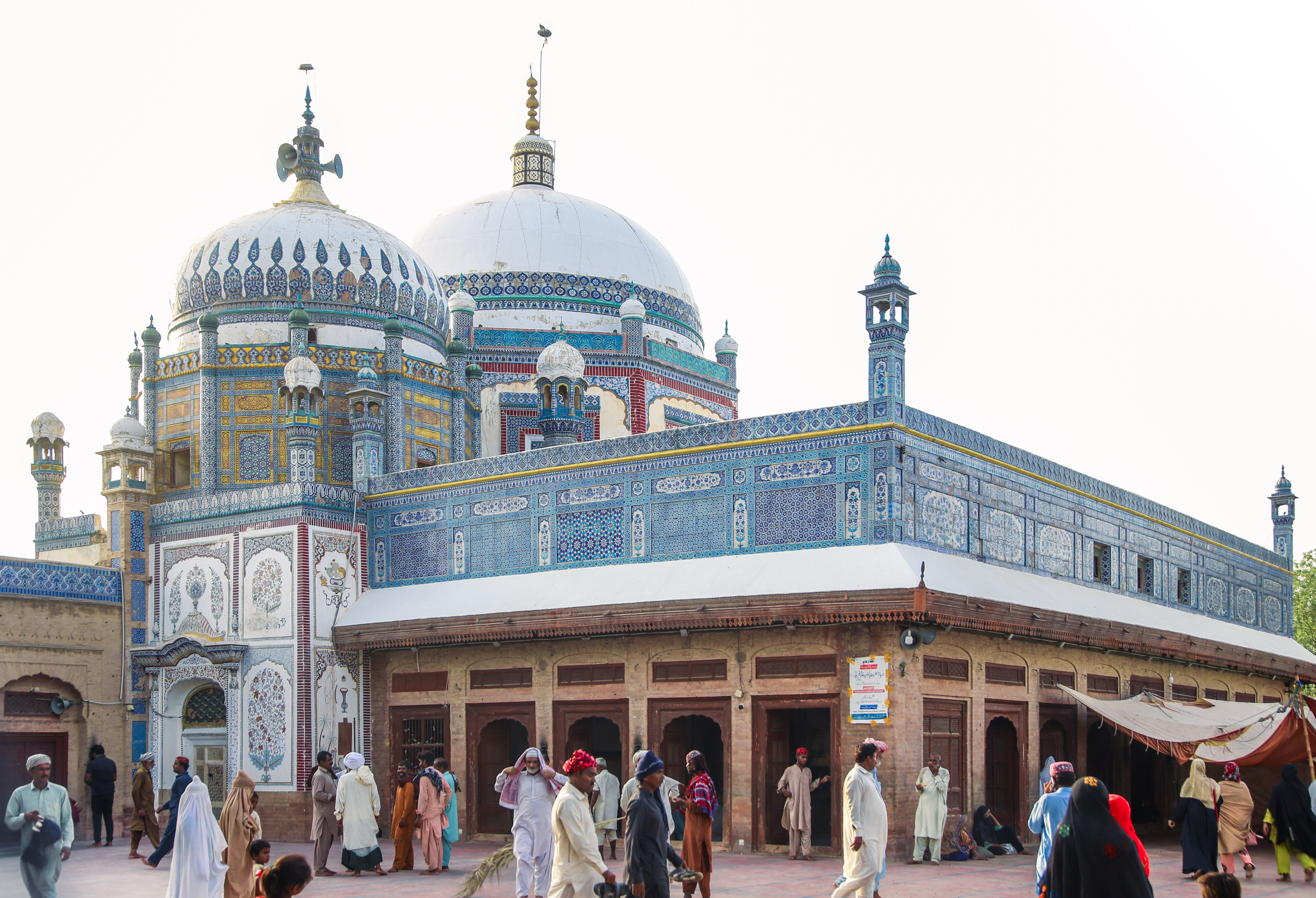
- Tomb of Khwaja Ghulam Farid in Kot Mithan
- Born: c. 1841/1845; Chachran, Bahawalpur, British India (present-day Punjab, Pakistan)
- Died: 24 July 1901 (aged 56 or 60); Chachran, Bahawalpur, British India (present-day Punjab, Pakistan)
- Resting place: Mithankot, Punjab, Pakistan
- Writing career
- Notable works: Diwan-e-Farid; Manaqab-e-Mehboobia; Fawaid Faridia

Khawaja Ghulam Farid (Note: Punjabi: خواجہ غلام فرید) (also romanized as Fareed; c. 1841/1845 – 24 July 1901) was a 19th-century Sufi poet and mystic from Bahawalpur, Punjab, belonging to the Chishti Order. Most of his work is in his mother tongue Multani, or what is now known as Saraiki. However, he also contributed to the Standard Punjabi, Urdu, Pashto, Sindhi, Hindi and Persian literature. His writing style is characterized by the integration of themes such as death, passionate worldly and spiritual love, and the grief associated with love.

== Life ==
He was born into a branch of the Koreja family who claimed descent from Umar (r. 634–644), the second Rashidun caliph through an early migrant to Sindh. The family was established as saints associated with the Suhrawardī Sufi order. Originally from Thatta, Sindh, the family seat later moved to Mithankot in the early 18th century on the invitation of a disciple and subsequently transferred their allegiance to the Chishtī order. Khawaja Farid was born c. 1841/1845 at Chachran. Farid's father died when he was around eight years of age. He was then brought up by his elder brother, Khawaja Fakhr al-Dīn, and grew up to become a scholar and writer. He received a fine formal education at the royal palace of Ṣādiq Muḥammad IV, the Nawab of Bahawalpur. His brother Fakhr al-Dīn, who had brought him up after their parents' deaths, also died when Farid was 26 years old. Farid performed hajj (pilgrimage to Mecca) in 1875, and then retired to the Cholistan Desert (also known as Rohi) for chilla (retreat) where he spent a total of eighteen years. He died at Chachran on 24 July, 1901, and was buried at Mithankot.

He is mentioned in the Gazetteer of the Multan District (1901-02) prepared and published by Edward Douglas MacLagan in 1902.

== Works ==
His most significant works include:

- Masnavi Madan-e-Ishq (1882); Publisher: Gulzar-e-Muhammad Press, Lucknow
- Dīwān-i Farīd
- Manāqib-i maḥbūbiyya (Persian prose)
- Fawāʾid-i Farīdiyya (Persian prose)

== Legacy ==
- A literary award named after Farid – the Khwaja Ghulam Farid Award – is awarded yearly by the Pakistan Academy of Letters in literature, its recipients including Ismail Ahmedani (in 2013) and Irshad Taunsvi (in 2007) among others.
- Fareed Gate is the name of one of the historic gates surrounding the old city of Bahawalpur named in Farid's honour.
- The Khawaja Fareed University of Engineering and Information Technology (KFUEIT) in Rahim Yar Khan District was named after Farid.
- Shrine of Khawaja Ghulam Farid in Rajanpur, Punjab is among the 10 most visited shrines in Pakistan.

== See also ==
- Fariduddin Ganjshakar
- Saraiki literature
- Qari Muhammad Muslehuddin Siddiqui
- Pathanay Khan
- Christopher Shackle
