= Chak Abdullah railway station =

Railway station in Pakistan

Chak Abdullah Station چک عبد الله اسٹیشن

General information
- Coordinates: 29.8704°N 72.9681°E
- Owner: Ministry of Railways
- Line: Samasata–Amruka Branch Line

Other information
- Station code: CAL
Location

Chak Abdullah railway station (Urdu: چک عبد الله ریلوے اسٹیشن) is located in Pakistan.

== See also ==
- List of railway stations in Pakistan
- Pakistan Railways
