= Dunga Bunga railway station =

Pakistani railway station

General information
- Coordinates: 29.7475°N 73.2283°E
- Owner: Ministry of Railways

Other information
- Station code: DNBA

History
- Former names: Great Indian Peninsula Railway
Location

Dunga Bunga railway station (Urdu: ڈونگہ بونگہ ریلوے اسٹیشن) is located in Pakistan.

== See also ==
- List of railway stations in Pakistan
- Pakistan Railways
