= Minchinabad =

- Location in Pakistan
- Coordinates: 30°10′N 73°34′E
- Country: Pakistan
- Province: Punjab
- District: Bahawalnagar District

Population (2023)
  - Total: 67,164
- Time zone: UTC+5 (PST)
  - Summer (DST): +6

Minchinabad (Urdu: مِنچِن آباد), is a city of Bahawalnagar District in the Punjab province of Pakistan. The city is the capital of Minchinabad Tehsil. It underwent rapid development in the late 1860s and 1870s. The city is named after Colonel Charles Cherry Minchin (1829-1899), the British Political Agent overseeing the Bahawalpur Princely State from 1866 to 1876

== Demographics ==
The population of city in 1972 was 7,112 but according to the 2023 Census of Pakistan, the population has risen to 67,164.

| Census | Population |
|---|---|
| 1972 | 7,112 |
| 1981 | 14,550 |
| 1998 | 25,480 |
| 2017 | 56,563 |
| 2023 | 67,164 |
