= Khanqah Muhammad Panah railway station =

Railway station in Pakistan

Coordinates: 29°43′N 72°38′E

General information
- Owner: Ministry of Railways

Other information
- Station code: KEM

History
- Former names: Great Indian Peninsula Railway
Location

Khanqah Muhammad Panah railway station (Urdu: خانقاہ محمد پناہ ریلوے اسٹیشن) is located in Pakistan.

== See also ==
- List of railway stations in Pakistan
- Pakistan Railways
