= Qaimpur railway station =

Railway station in Pakistan

General information
- Coordinates: 29.6641°N 72.4697°E
- Owner: Ministry of Railways

Other information
- Station code: QMP

History
- Former names: Great Indian Peninsula Railway
Location

Qaimpur railway station (Urdu: قائم پور ریلوے اسٹیشن) is located in Pakistan.

== See also ==
- List of railway stations in Pakistan
- Pakistan Railways
