= Minchinabad Tehsil =

Minchinabad Tehsil تحصِيل مِنچِن آباد
- Tehsil
- Tehsil Municipal Administration logo

- Location of Minchinabad Tehsil in Punjab, Pakistan
- Coordinates: 30.1622° N, 73.5653° E
- Country: Pakistan
- Region: (Punjab, Pakistan) Punjab
- District: Bahawalnagar
- Capital: Minchinabad
- Towns: 1
- Union councils: 25

Government
  - Assistant Commissioner: Wahab Hero
  - Chief Officer: Syed Rashid Ghaznavi

Area
  - Tehsil: 1,818 km^{2} (702 sq mi)

Population (2023)
  - Tehsil: 603,125
  - Density: 331.8/km^{2} (859.2/sq mi)
  - Urban: 118,236 (19.60%)
  - Rural: 484,889 (80.40%)
- Time zone: UTC+5 (PST)
- Postal code: 62230

Minchinabad Tehsil (Urdu: تحصِيل مِنچِن آباد), is a tehsil located in Bahawalnagar District, Punjab, Pakistan. The city of Minchinabad is the headquarters of the tehsil which is administratively subdivided into 25 Union Councils.

The smaller cities of Mandi Sadiq Gunj TC and McLeod Gunj TC are also included in Tehsil Minchinabad.

Through Minchinabad city passes a canal named Head Ford Wah passes and a suspended bridge on this canal built during the British Raj is worth seeing.

== Geography ==
Minchinabad Tehsil has an area of 1,818 km^{2}.

=== Adjacent tehsils ===
- Depalpur Tehsil, Okara District (north)
- Fazilka Tehsil, Fazilka District, Punjab, India (northeast)
- Sri Ganganagar Tehsil, Sri Ganganagar District, Rajasthan, India (south)
- Karanpur Tehsil, Sri Ganganagar District, Rajasthan, India (southwest)
- Bahawalnagar Tehsil (southwest)
- Pakpattan Tehsil, Pakpattan District (northwest)

== Demographics ==
=== Population ===
Historical population
Year	Pop.	±% p.a.
1951	118,846	—
1961	138,200	+1.52%
1972	185,985	+2.74%
1981	225,838	+2.18%
1998	354,261	+2.68%
2017	526,428	+2.11%
2023	603,125	+2.29%

As of the 2023 census, Minchinabad Tehsil had a population of 603,125. According to the 2017 Census of Pakistan, there are 526,428 people living in Minchinabad Tehsil and 83,173 households. Its population recorded in the 1998 census was 354,261.
