= Khichi Wala railway station =

Railway station in Pakistan

General information
- Owner: Ministry of Railways

Other information
- Station code: KCWL

History
- Former names: Great Indian Peninsula Railway

Khichi Wala railway station (Urdu: کھچی والا ریلوے اسٹیشن) is located in Pakistan.

The commencement of train service greatly promoted agricultural and commercial activities in Khichi wala and its surrounding areas, and grain markets were established there.

== See also ==
- List of railway stations in Pakistan
- Pakistan Railways
