= Dhab Sanateka railway station =

Railway station in Pakistan

General information
- Owner: Ministry of Railways

Other information
- Station code: DBST

History
- Former names: Great Indian Peninsula Railway

Dhab Sanateka railway station (Urdu: دھب سناٹیکا ریلوے اسٹیشن) is an abandoned station located in the Bahawalnagar District of Punjab, Pakistan. Located on the Bahawalnagar–Fort Abbas branch line, it is 13 km from the Bahawalnagar Junction. The station was part of a major colonial-era rail network but has been severely neglected.

== See also ==
- List of railway stations in Pakistan
- Pakistan Railways
