= Bahawalnagar Junction railway station =

Railway station in Punjab, Pakistan

Bahawalnagar Junction Station بہاولنگر جنکشن اسٹیشن
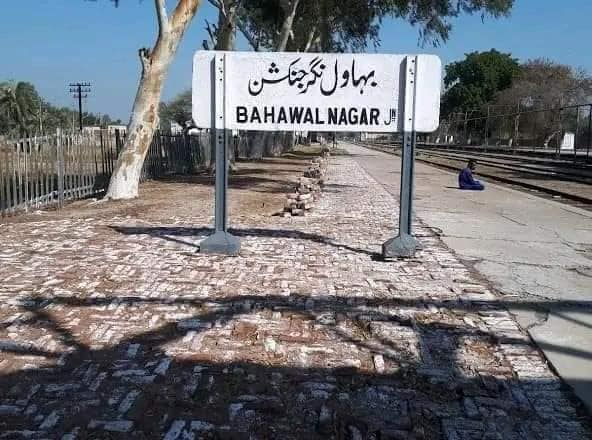

General information
- Location: Eid Gah Road, Bahawalnagar, Punjab 62300
- Coordinates: 30.0024°N 73.2527°E
- Owner: Ministry of Railways
- Line: Samasata-Fazilka Branch Line Bahawalnagar–Fort Abbas Branch Line

Other information
- Status: Suspended
- Station code: BWU

History
- Opened: 1894
- Former names: Rojhanwali Station

Services
Preceding station	Pakistan Railways	Following station
Madrisa towards Samasata Junction	Samasata–Amruka Branch Line	Minchinabad towards Amruka
Terminus	Bahawalnagar–Fort Abbas Branch Line	Haroonabad towards Fort Abbas
Location
- Location within Pakistan

Bahawalnagar Junction Railway Station (Urdu: بہاولنگر جنکشن ریلوے اسٹیشن, Punjabi: بہاولنگر جنکشن ریلوے اسٹیشن) is located in Pakistan.

== See also ==
- List of railway stations in Pakistan
- Pakistan Railways
