= Rafiq-Abad railway station =

Railway station in Pakistan

General information
- Owner: Ministry of Railways

Other information
- Station code: RQW

History
- Former names: Great Indian Peninsula Railway

Rafiq-Abad railway station (Urdu: رفیق -آباد ریلوے اسٹیشن) is located in Pakistan.

== See also ==
- List of railway stations in Pakistan
- Pakistan Railways
