= Goth Shah Muhammad railway station =

Railway station located in Pakistan

General information
- Coordinates: 29.4863°N 72.0585°E
- Owner: Ministry of Railways

Other information
- Station code: GSM

History
- Former names: Great Indian Peninsula Railway
Location

Goth Shah Muhammad railway station (Urdu: گوٹھ شاہ محمد ریلوے اسٹیشن) is located in Pakistan.

== See also ==
- List of railway stations in Pakistan
- Pakistan Railways
