= Takht Mahal railway station =

Railway station in Pakistan

General information
- Coordinates: 29.9387°N 73.1149°E
- Owner: Ministry of Railways

Other information
- Station code: TKM

History
- Former names: Great Indian Peninsula Railway
Location

Takht Mahal railway station (Urdu: تخت محل ریلوے اسٹیشن) is a railway station located in Pakistan.

== See also ==
- List of railway stations in Pakistan
- Pakistan Railways
