= Chaweka Road railway station =

Railway station in Pakistan

Coordinates: 30.054022°N 73.372851°E

General information
- Owner: Ministry of Railways

Other information
- Station code: CAD

History
- Former names: Great Indian Peninsula Railway
Location

Chaweka Road railway station (Urdu: چاویکا روڈ ریلوے اسٹیشن) is located in Pakistan.

== See also ==
- List of railway stations in Pakistan
- Pakistan Railways
