= Mubarakabad Halt railway station =

Railway station in Pakistan

General information
- Coordinates: 29.5328°N 73.073°E
- Owner: Ministry of Railways

Other information
- Station code: MBAK

History
- Former names: Great Indian Peninsula Railway
Location

Mubarakabad Halt railway station (Urdu: مبارکبادہالٹ ریلوے اسٹیشن) is located in Pakistan.

== See also ==
- List of railway stations in Pakistan
- Pakistan Railways
