= Mitti Roya railway station =

Railway station in Pakistan

Coordinates: 30.033213°N 73.316569°E

General information
- Owner: Ministry of Railways

Other information
- Station code: MRY

History
- Former names: Great Indian Peninsula Railway
Location

Mitti Roya railway station (Urdu: متی رویا ریلوے اسٹیشن) is located in Pakistan.

== See also ==
- List of railway stations in Pakistan
- Pakistan Railways
