= Chachran railway station =

Railway station in Pakistan

Chachran Railway Station چاچڑاں ریلوے اسٹیشن

General information
- Owner: Ministry of Railways
- Line: Khanpur–Chachran Railway

Other information
- Station code: CCN

Services
Preceding station	Pakistan Railways	Following station
Zahir Pir towards Khanpur	Khanpur–Chachran Railway (defunct)	Terminus
Location

Chachran Railway Station (Urdu: چاچڑاں ریلوے اسٹیشن) is located in Pakistan.

== See also ==
- List of railway stations in Pakistan
- Pakistan Railways
