= Chachran Sharif =

Pakistani town

Chachran Sharif چاچڑاں شرِیف
- Town
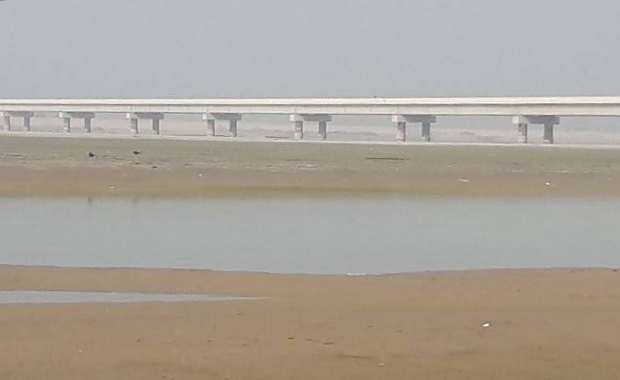
- Bridge on Indus river at Chachran Sharif

- Location within Pakistan
- Coordinates: 30.12°N 71.27°E
- Country: Pakistan
- Province: Punjab

Population (2017 census)
  - Total: 184,793 (Tehsil population)
- Time zone: UTC+5 (PST)

Chachran Sharif (Urdu: چاچڑاں شرِیف), is a town in Khanpur Katora tehsil of the Rahim Yar Khan district, in the Punjab province of Pakistan.

== History ==
Chacharan Sharif is a historical town of Rahim Yar Khan district, which is attributed with the name of famous 19th century Punjabi poet and saint Khawaja Ghulam Farid and it is called Farid city as he was born and lived in this city. This city is situated at the east bank of Indus River and is the last northern town of Rahim Yar Khan district. After it the territory of Rajanpur district begins; Mithankot, another historic town is directly across the river Indus on its west bank.

A new Bridge is built on the Indus River useful for connection between two districts, Rahim Yar Khan and Rajanpur. In this way, the bridge facilitates travel for thousands of people of the Rahim Yar Khan and Rajanpur districts.

== Postal services and railway mail ==
The history of postal services in Chachran Sharif dates back to at least the nineteenth century. The Indian Postal Guide dated 1 June 1875 lists "Chachran" among the post offices in the Punjab postal circle. The entry places it under the Khanpur postal office. This establishes that a post office existed at Chachran by 1875, although the exact year of its establishment is not known.

A Government of India treaty compilation published in 1931 records that the Imperial Postal Department took over postal arrangements in the Bahawalpur State in 1870. This provides historical context for the postal administration in the region.

The Khanpur–Chachran Sharif railway line was opened in 1911. According to the Railway Board's Administration Report for 1916–17, the line was owned by the Bahawalpur Durbar and operated, maintained and managed by the North Western Railway. A railway agreement also provided for the carriage of mail on the line. Clause 22 of the agreement assigned the railway responsibility for conveying postal mail under the stipulated conditions.

The 1951 Census of Pakistan's village list for Bahawalpur State records a post office and a railway station in Chachran Sharif Municipality. It separately lists the rural locality of Chachran and marks it as having a post office. The census gives the population of Chachran Sharif Municipality as 2,950 and that of Chachran (Rural) as 670.

The Government of Pakistan's 1962 classified list of post offices records "Chachran" under Rahim Yar Khan Head Office. The entry identifies it as a Town Sub-Office and includes the letter "R", which the publication uses to indicate direct communication with the Railway Mail Service (RMS).

== Courts ==
There are no courts in Chachran Sharif itself. However, there is a sub-divisional headquarters for courts in Khanpur Katora tehsil, which comprises two honourable additional session judges and five civil judges. The bar consists of 280 members. Many Advocate from the town are practicing in the sub-division court

== Major tribes ==
The main clans of the Chachran area are the [Pahore], Syed, Khosa, Malik Solangi, Malik Balhara, Mirani, Ghouri, Koreja, Gishkori, Soomro, Qureshi, Chachar, Awan, Dashti, Mughal, Khawaja, Mian, Rajput, Bhatti, Baloch, Arain, Jat, Jam, Abbasi, Malik, Jatoi, Gharro, Mirani, Khokhar and Patafi. Prior to the partition of British India in 1947, at least one third of the population consisted of Hindus with predominance of Aroras who conducted much of the business and finance of the town. They left for India after the 1947 partition.

== Famous places and tourist attractions ==
=== Saraye Farid ===
Khawaja Ghulam Farid Saran was built in the eighteenth century. The building structure is a blend of multi-cultural architecture, incorporating a typical eighteenth-century design as well as a traditional touch of both old and modern form of Pakistani architecture. Along With, Bank of the Indus River is the attraction for all tourists visiting town pertaining to the natural landscaping and attractable locations for a fresh breath and peace of Mind.

=== Railway Station ===
Chachran Railway was a branch railway line built to connect Khanpur with Chachran (now Chachran Sharif) in the former princely state of Bahawalpur. The construction of the line was sanctioned in 1909 by the British Indian Government in cooperation with the Bahawalpur State Durbar. The railway was financed by the Durbar and was intended to improve transport and communication between the two towns.

An agreement between the Secretary of State for India and the Bahawalpur Durbar was concluded on 21 August 1912, with effect from 1 January 1911. Under the agreement, the Government of India arranged for the construction of the railway through the North Western Railway (NWR), while the Bahawalpur Durbar provided the necessary funds and land. The line remained the property of the Bahawalpur Durbar, whereas the NWR was responsible for its management, maintenance, equipment and operation.

According to the Railway Board's official administration report, the line was opened for traffic on 2 July 1911. It was built to the broad gauge standard of 5 ft 6 in (1,676 mm). The engineering specifications included 60-pound flat-footed steel rails, brick and stone ballast, and a ruling gradient of 1 in 500.

The 1912 agreement gave the North Western Railway responsibility for operating trains, providing staff and rolling stock, maintaining the track and handling passenger and goods traffic. It also required the railway to carry postal mail and other official traffic on the line under the applicable railway conditions and rates. The agreement further provided for the maintenance of railway accounts and allowed the Bahawalpur Durbar to inspect the relevant records.

The railway formed part of the North Western Railway system for operational purposes, although it remained owned by the Bahawalpur State Durbar. It connected Khanpur with Chachran and provided a rail link to the town on the Indus River. The line is also referred to in historical railway references as the Bahawalpur Royal Railway.

Further research in railway administration reports, Bahawalpur State records and Pakistan Railways archives is needed to establish the complete operational history of the line, including its later service frequency, the dates of suspension and closure, and the condition of its stations and track.

==== Suspension and closure ====
According to a written response by the Minister for Railways in the Senate of Pakistan on 20 July 2016, passenger train services on the Khanpur–Chachran section were suspended in 1991, along with the closure of the section. The minister stated that the closure was part of Pakistan Railways' policy of discontinuing unremunerative train services and sections due to financial constraints. At the time of the response, there was no proposal under consideration to restore the service.

In October 2018, the Associated Press of Pakistan reported, citing an official of the Ministry of Railways, that the Khanpur–Chachran section had been among the railway sections discontinued since 1991.

=== TDCP Boating Safari Park ===
The TDCP Boating Safari Park is a tourism and recreational development project of the Tourism Development Corporation of Punjab (TDCP), located on the bank of the Indus River at Chachran Sharif, near the Shaheed Benazir Bhutto Bridge, in Rahim Yar Khan District, Punjab, Pakistan.

==== Background and approval ====
The project was proposed in 2022 following an initiative and recommendation by local journalist Asif Gishkori, who advocated the development of a tourism and recreational destination along the Indus River at Chachran Sharif. The proposal was taken up during the tenure of Dr Ehsan Bhutta, then Secretary of Tourism, Punjab, and received approval in 2022.

The boating safari was officially inaugurated on 7 July 2022 by Dr Ehsan Bhutta. Officials from TDCP and the district administration attended the inauguration. Initially, TDCP arranged two boats, each with a capacity of 12 passengers, and selected local residents for operational duties after providing them with training.

==== Project development and facilities ====
The broader development plan extends beyond the initial boating service and includes a tourism resort, restaurant, children's play area, fishing point and river-based recreational activities. The project is intended to provide visitors with recreational facilities while promoting tourism along the Indus River in southern Punjab.

At the time of the inauguration, the Secretary of Tourism also called for the resolution of land acquisition matters so that a tourist resort could be developed at the site.

According to departmental correspondence and records of TDCP, land for the project has subsequently been purchased. Development work is ongoing, with the wider project intended to include the resort and associated recreational facilities.

==== Boating operations ====
On 8 July 2022, Dawn reported that the boating safari had been launched with two boats but that several supporting facilities, including an access road, cafeteria, washrooms, waiting area and parking, were not yet available.

In September 2022, the Associated Press of Pakistan reported that the boating service had resumed after a temporary suspension of approximately two months due to high flood levels in the Indus River. Two TDCP boats were reported to be operating for visitors at that time.

The project represents an effort to develop river-based tourism at Chachran Sharif and expand recreational opportunities in the Indus River region of southern Punjab.

== Education ==
The government high schools for girls & boys are both separately providing education in many disciplines. There are many private schools also providing quality education.

== Poets ==
Khawaja Ghulam Farid was a famous poet of Chachran Sharif. He wrote many books of poetry as well as of Islamic sciences.

== Languages ==
Saraiki is the major language that is widely spoken. Other national languages of Pakistan Urdu, English, and Punjabi are also fluently spoken and understood, especially at formal events. Some people can speak, write or understand Arabic language as well.
