= Fort Abbas railway station =

Railway station in Pakistan

Fort Abbas Railway Station فورٹ عباس ریلوے اسٹیشن

General information
- Coordinates: 29.1904°N 72.8554°E
- Owner: Ministry of Railways
- Line: Bahawalnagar–Fort Abbas Branch Line

Other information
- Station code: FPA

Services
Preceding station	Pakistan Railways	Following station
Faqirwali towards Bahawalnagar Junction	Bahawalnagar–Fort Abbas Branch Line	Terminus
Location

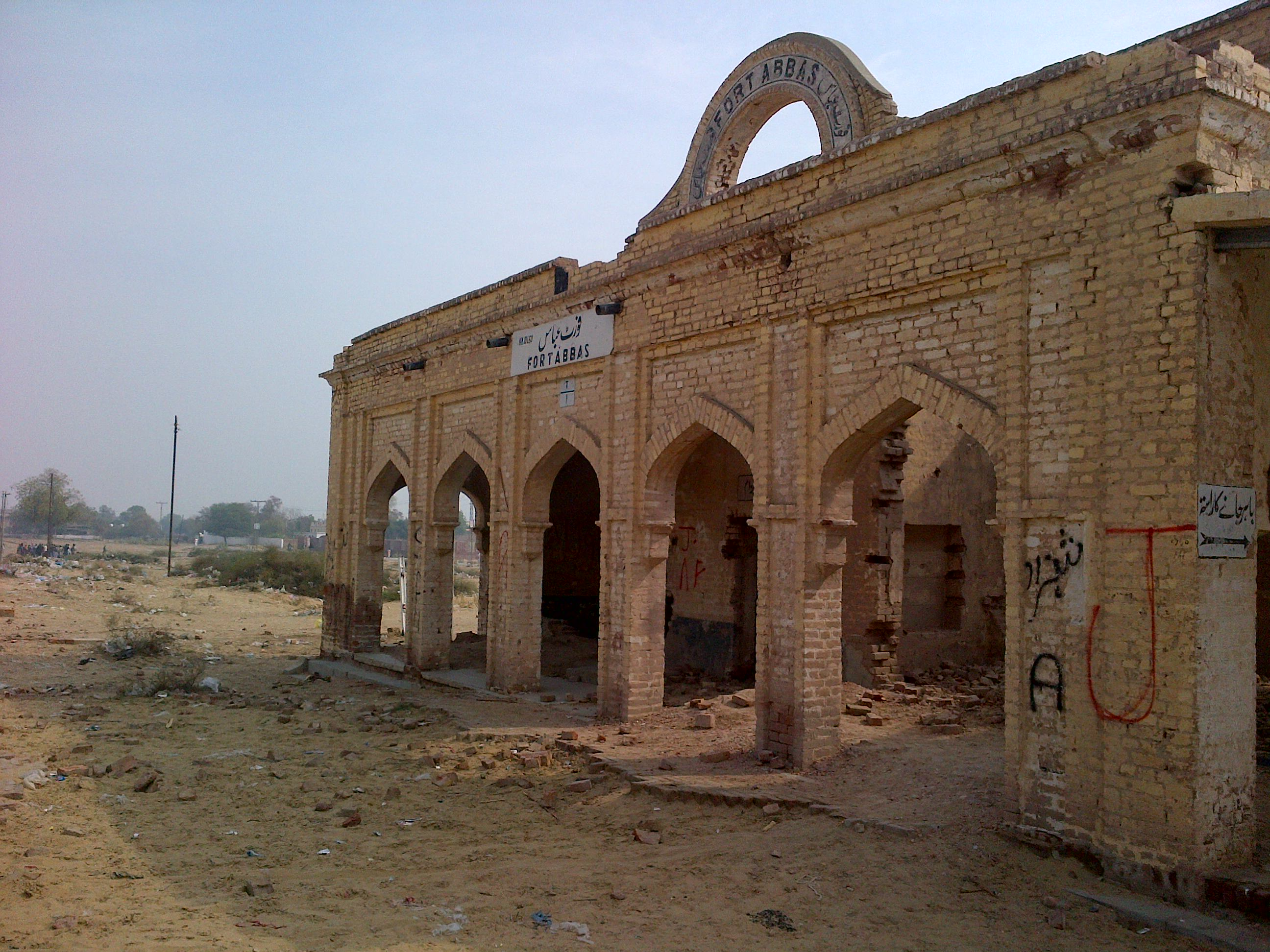
Fort Abbas Railway Station

Fort Abbas Railway Station (Urdu: فورٹ عباس ریلوے اسٹیشن, Punjabi: فورٹ عباس ریلوے اسٹیشن) is located in Pakistan.

== See also ==
- List of railway stations in Pakistan
- Pakistan Railways
