= Mithankot =

Mithan Kot مٹھن كوٹ
- Town
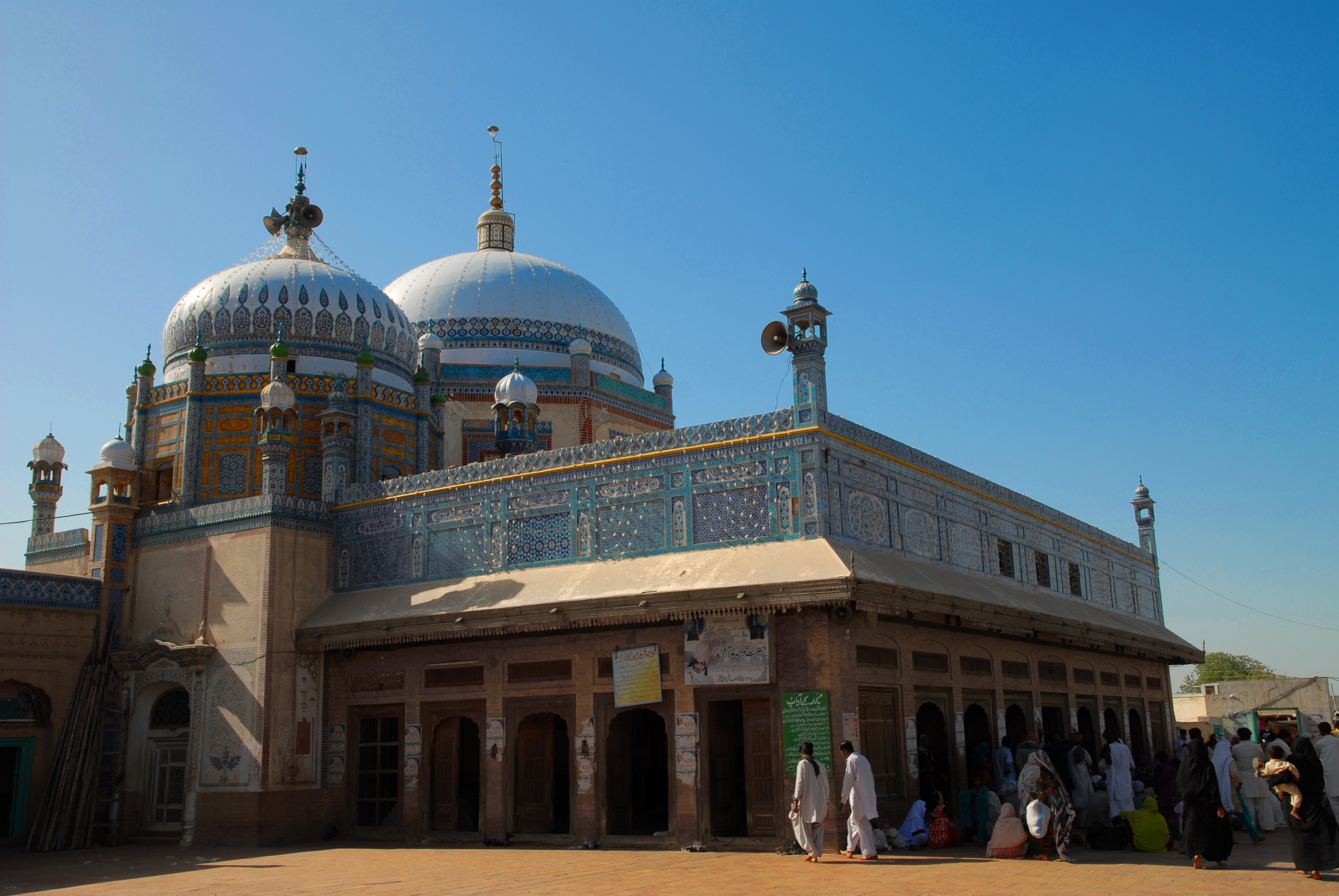
- The tomb of Khawaja Ghulam Fareed is located in Mithankot

- Location within Pakistan
- Coordinates: 28°57′0″N 70°22′0″E
- Country: Pakistan
- Province: Punjab
- District: Rajanpur
- Division: Dera Ghazi Khan Division

Population (2023 census)
  - Total: 74,479
- Time zone: UTC+5 (PST)
- Postal code: 33600
- Calling code: 0604

Mithankot (Saraiki: مِٹھّݨ کوٹ/کوٹ مِٹھّݨ) also known as Kot Mithan, is a city in Rajanpur District in Punjab, Pakistan. Mithankot is located on the west bank of the Indus River, a short distance downstream from its junction with Panjnand River. Most of its inhabitants are Saraikis and Baloch. The city is noted for being the site of the tomb of Sufi poet, Khawaja Ghulam Fareed. Kot Mithan is also the land where all five main rivers of Pakistan merge.

== Climate ==
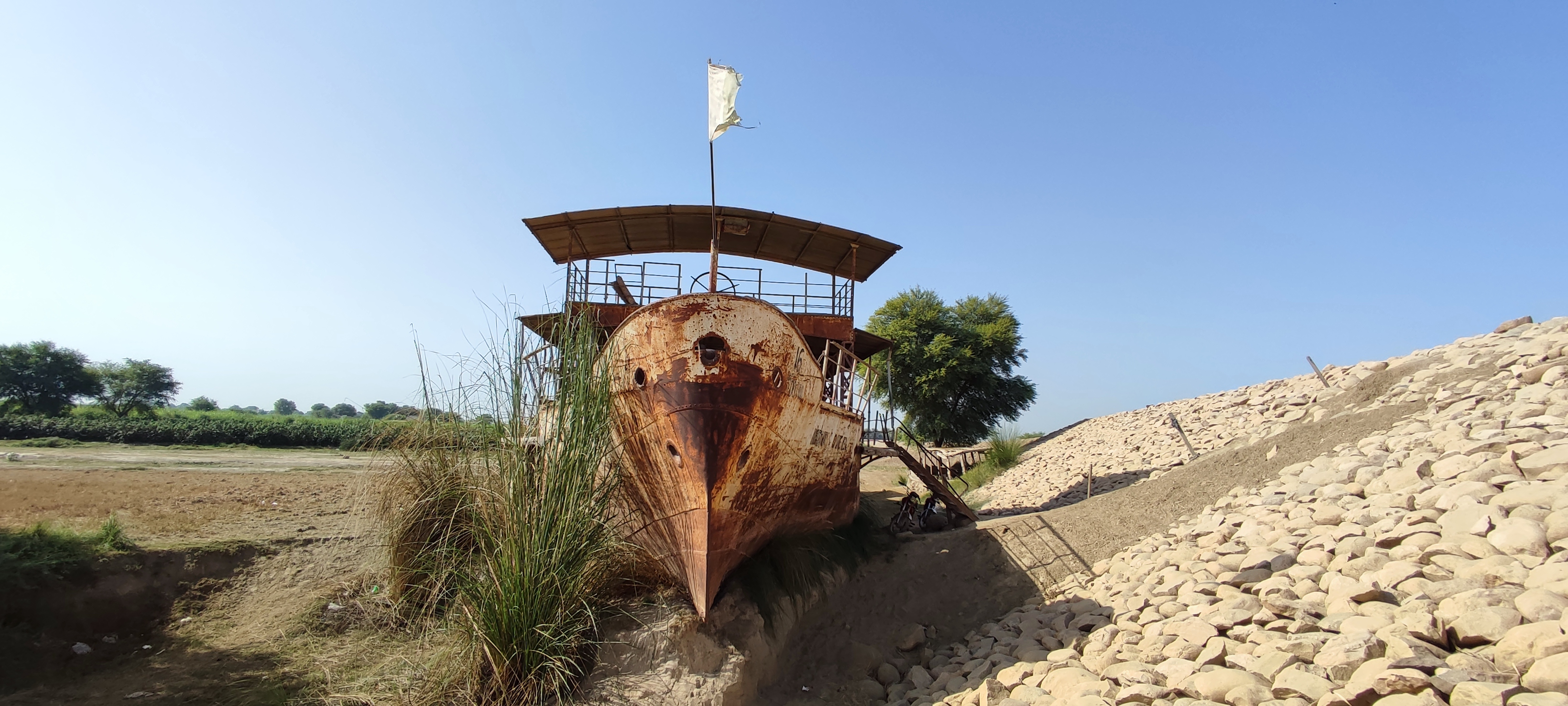
Boat on the banks of the Indus River in Mithankot

The climate is arid and desert-like, the average annual rainfall being only 7 inches (175 mm). Varying extremities in temperature depending on the season. To the south side is the great Indus River.

The cultivation of crops such as wheat, sugarcane, cotton and rice is enabled through irrigation from the canals from the Indus.

== Demographics ==
Population

Historical population
Year	Pop.	±%
1972	6,338	—
1981	8,531	+34.6%
1998	13,653	+60.0%
2017	36,755	+169.2%
2023	74,479	+102.6%

According to the 2023 Census of Pakistan, the population of Kot Mithan reached 74,479, growing significantly from the 36,755 residents recorded in the 2017 Census. The 2023 demographic structure reflects a gender distribution of 36,983 males (49.7%) and 37,489 females (50.3%).

== Notable places ==
- Tomb of Khawaja Ghulam Farid
