= Samasata Junction railway station =

Railway station in Punjab, Pakistan

Samasata Junction Railway Station سمہ سٹہ جنکشن ریلوے اسٹیشن
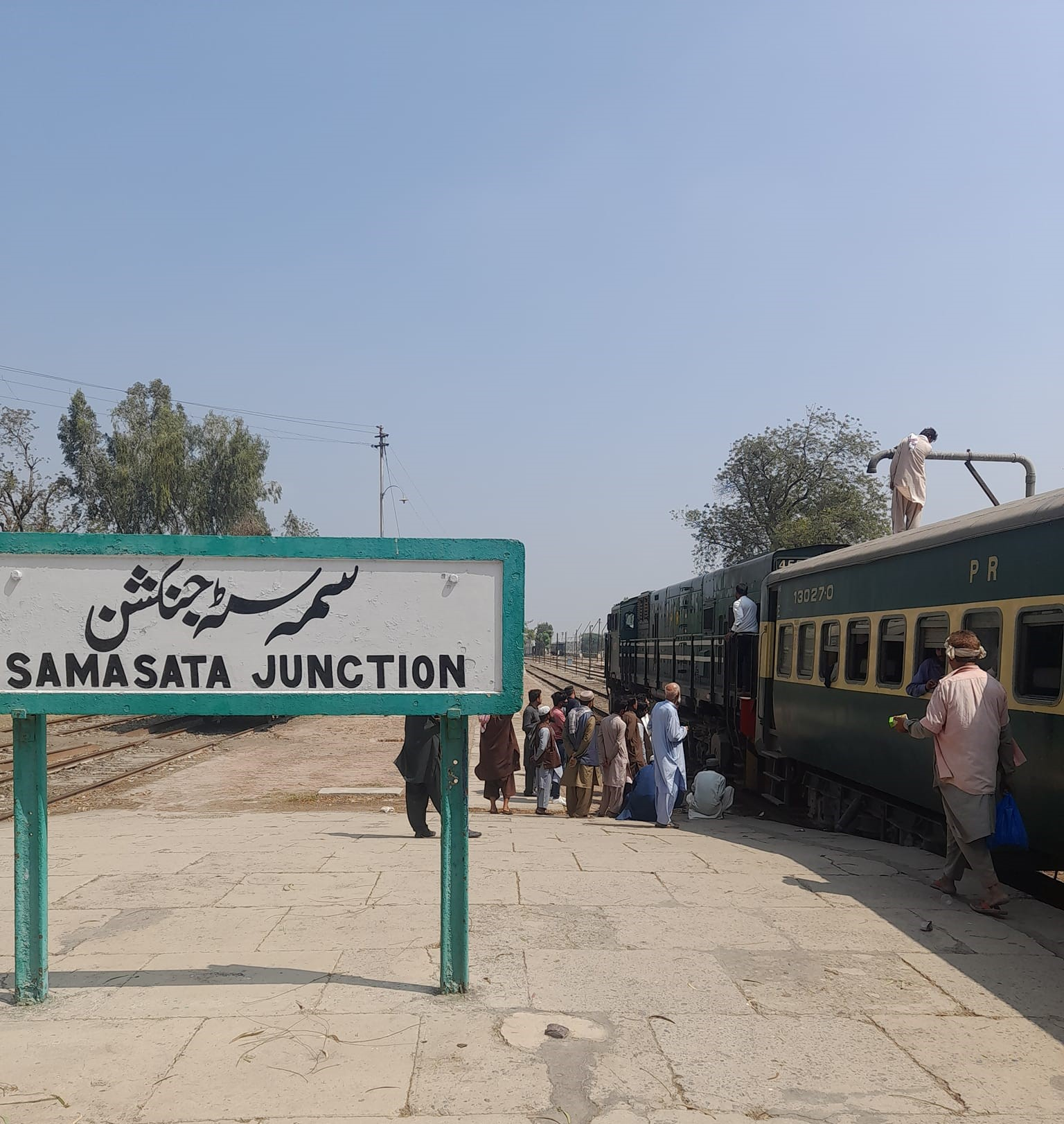

General information
- Location: Railway Road, Samasata, Punjab 63250
- Coordinates: 29.3485°N 71.5471°E
- Owner: Ministry of Railways
- Line: Karachi–Peshawar Railway Line Samasata–Fazilka Branch Line

Other information
- Station code: SMA

History
- Opened: 1878

Services
Preceding station	Pakistan Railways	Following station
Kalanchwala towards Kiamari	Karachi–Peshawar Line	Bahawalpur towards Peshawar Cantonment
Terminus	Samasata–Amruka Branch Line	Baghdad towards Amruka
Location
- Location within Pakistan

Samasata Junction Railway Station (Urdu and Punjabi: سمہ سٹہ جنکشن اسٹیشن) is located in Samasata town, Bahawalpur district of Punjab province, Pakistan. The station served as the junction between the Karachi–Peshawar Railway Line and the now defunct Samasata–Amruka Branch Line (and onwards to the Bahawalnagar–Fort Abbas Branch Line).

== Gallery ==
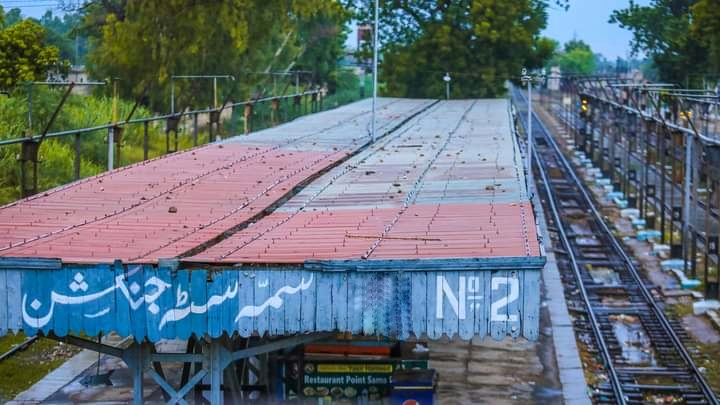

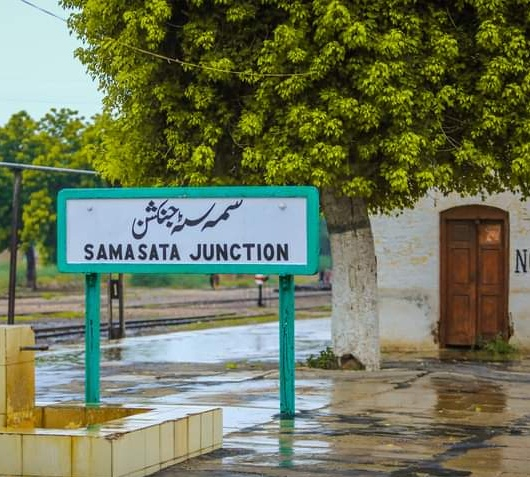

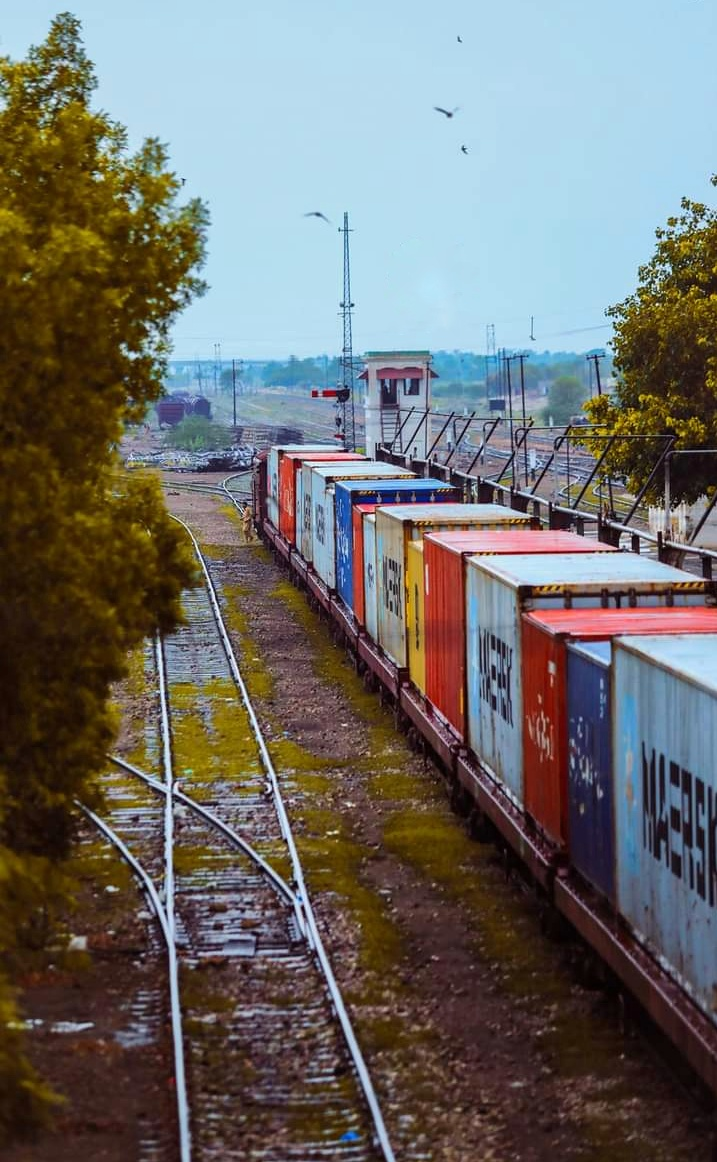

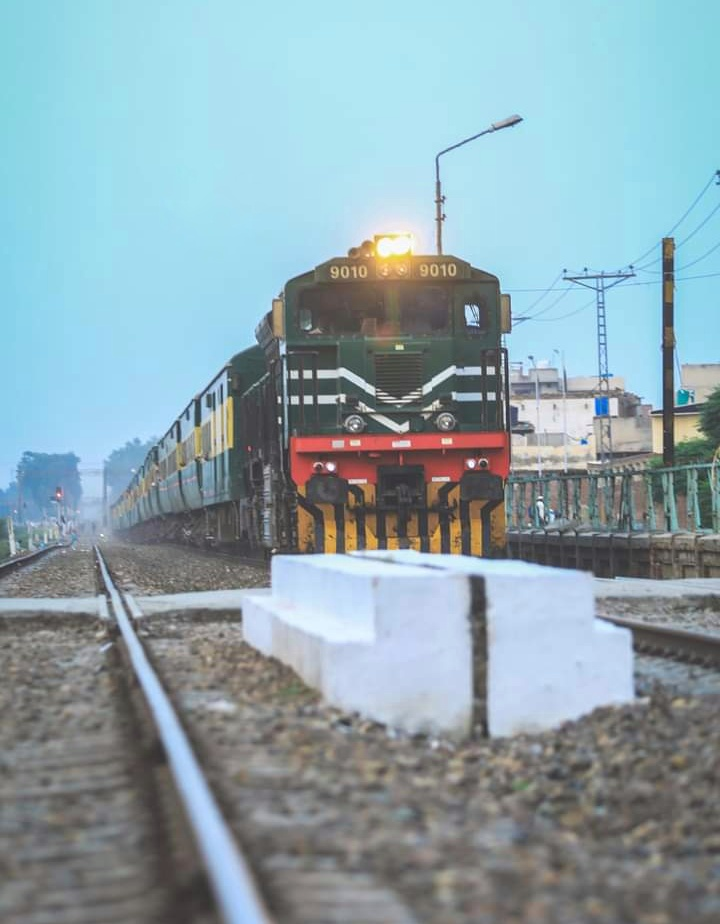

== See also ==
- List of railway stations in Pakistan
- Pakistan Railways
