= Amruka railway station =

Railway station in Punjab, Pakistan

Amruka Railway Station امرُوکہ ریلوے اسٹیشن
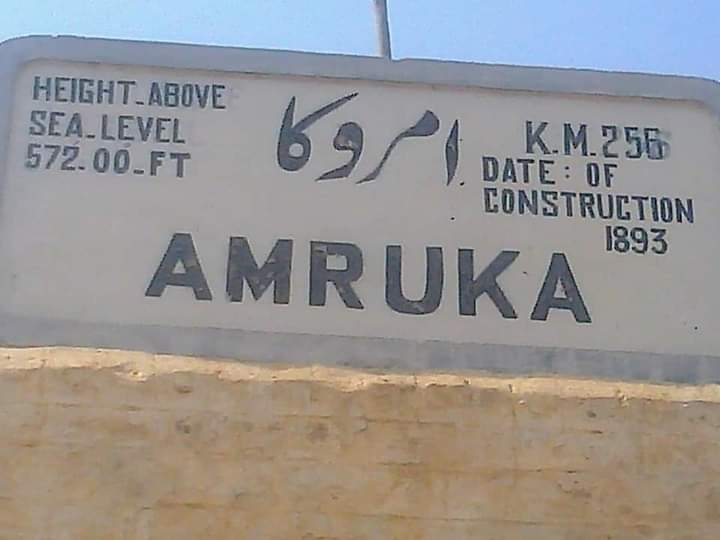

General information
- Other names: Amrooka Station
- Location: Amruka, Minchinabad Tehsil; Bahawalnagar District, Punjab; Pakistan
- Coordinates: 30.2985°N 73.8979°E
- Owner: Ministry of Railways
- Line: Samasata-Amruka Branch Line

Other information
- Status: Suspended
- Station code: AMK

Services
Preceding station	Pakistan Railways	Following station
Sobha Wala towards Samasata Junction	Samasata–Amruka Branch Line	Terminus
Location

Amruka Railway Station (Urdu: امرُوکا ریلوے اسٹیشن, Punjabi: امروکہ ریلوے اسٹیشن) is located in Amruka town of Minchinabad tehsil in Bahawalnagar district, Punjab province, Pakistan. It Was Constructed In 1893.

== See also ==
- List of railway stations in Pakistan
- Pakistan Railways
