= Dahranwala =

Dahranwala ڈاہرانوالہ
- City
- Location in Pakistan
- Coordinates: 29.5967°N 72.8456°E
- Country: Pakistan
- Province: Punjab
- Division: Bahawalpur
- District: Bahawalnagar
- Tehsil: Chishtian
- Union Councils: 9

Area
  - Total: 48 km^{2} (19 sq mi)
- Elevation: 154 m (505 ft)

Population (2026)
  - Total: 59,715 approx.
- Time zone: UTC+5 (UTC)
- Postal code: 62380
- Calling code: 063

Dahranwala (Punjabi, Urdu: ڈاہرانوالہ) is a city located in Tehsil Chishtian, within the District Bahawalnagar of Punjab Province of Pakistan.

== Geography ==
The city of Dahranwala is situated in the southern region of Punjab Province. The surrounding area is characterized by a flat, fertile plain, making it highly suitable for agriculture. It shares its administrative boundaries with Haroonabad to the east, Hasilpur to the west, Chishtian to the north, and Fort Abbas to the south.

Dahranwala City

== Population and demographics ==
Dahranwala has an estimated population of around 38,000 people. The city is home to a diverse community, with residents speaking Punjabi, Urdu, and Saraiki. While majority of people's speak Pubjabi approximately 95 percent. Islam is the predominant religion, although a small Christian minority also resides in the area.

== Economy ==
Dahranwala's economy is primarily based on agriculture. The city is particularly known for the cultivation of wheat and cotton, which are major contributors to the local economy.

== Education ==
Dahranwala hosts several educational institutions that cater to students from primary to higher secondary levels. These institutes play a vital role in improving literacy and educational opportunities in the region.

Educational institutions in Dahranwala
Public Institutions
Govt. Girls Higher Secondary School Dahranwala
Govt. Boys Higher Secondary School Dahranwala
Govt. Degree College for Boys Dahranwala
Govt. Degree College for Girls Dahranwala

Private Institutions
Umar Science High School Dahranwala
Umar Science High School for Girls Dahranwala
Umar College of Education Dahranwala
Modern Science School Dahranwala
Misali Public School Dahranwala
DPS School System Dahranwala
Allied School System Dahranwala
The Country School Dahranwala
Antalya Schools & Colleges Dahranwala
Al-Ghazali Middle School Dahranwala
Ali Garh College Dahranwala
APEX Group of Colleges Dahranwala
Roots Grammar School Dahranwala
Jinnah Education System Dahranwala
Rehman Science Higher Secondary School Dahranwala
Dar-e-Arqam School Dahranwala
The Knowledge School Dahranwala
Empire college Dahranwala
The educators school Dahranwala
The gain school and college

== Sports ==
Dahranwala faces a shortage of sports facilities for its youth population. The only sports ground in the city is located at the Govt. Higher Secondary School, but it lacks the necessary infrastructure to support a range of sports. Despite these limitations, cricket, football, and volleyball remain popular activities. Floodlit cricket and football tournaments are held regularly; however, the lack of proper sports grounds limits opportunities for youth to engage in organized and healthy sporting activities.

== Culture ==
Dahranwala has a rich cultural heritage, with various traditional festivals and events celebrated throughout the year. Notably, the city hosts the 75 Mod Mela, a significant cultural event that attracts visitors from across the region. These events offer an opportunity for both locals and visitors to experience the city’s unique culture and traditions.

== Transportation ==
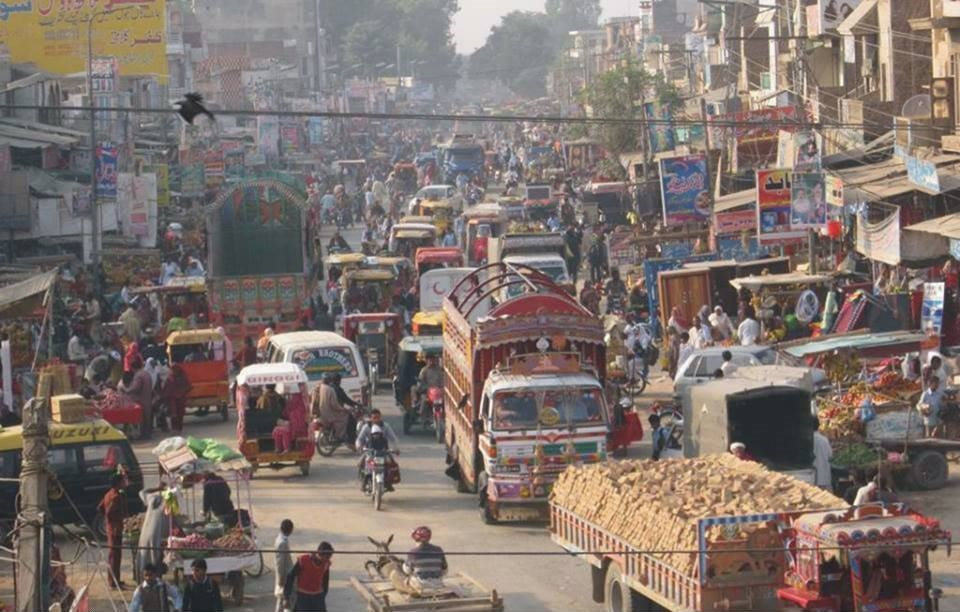
Traffic situation in Dahranwala

Dahranwala serves as an important transportation hub, with road connections to other cities across Pakistan. However, the road network within the city is in poor condition, posing challenges for residents and businesses alike. The inadequate state of the roads hampers the efficient movement of goods and people, leading to significant inconvenience for the local population. There is a pressing need for improvements in the road infrastructure to ensure better transportation and connectivity within the city.

== Tehsil Status Proposal and Delays ==
In 2017, a committee formed by the Punjab government recommended granting Dahranwala tehsil status and forwarded the summary to the Punjab Chief Minister for final approval. However, the recommendation has yet to be implemented, and there has been no subsequent action on the matter. The reasons for the delay remain unclear, and it is uncertain whether the proposal will be pursued in the future. Some local residents speculate that the recommendation was part of a political strategy aimed at garnering votes, rather than a genuine effort to improve the city’s administrative structure.

== Union Councils ==
Dahranwala town consists of 9 union councils which are mostly villages.

List of Union Councils
Union Councils No.	Union Council Name
75	Chak No. 112/M
76	Chak No. 118/M
77	Chak No. 128/M
79	Chak No. 173/M
80	Chak No. 201/M
81	Chak No. 177/M
82	Chak No. 167/M
83	Chak No. 169/M
84	Chak No. 134/M

== Climate ==
Dahranwala has a hot and humid climate, with extreme temperatures occurring during May, June, and July, with the mercury rising as high as 49-55 °C. In August, the monsoon season begins, bringing heavy rainfall to the area. December and January are the coldest months, with temperatures occasionally dropping to as low as -1 °C. The annual average rainfall for the city is around 160mm.

== General Election 2024 Results ==
National Assembly NA-162 (Bahawalnagar-III)
Candidates	Votes	Party
Ehsan Ul Haq Bajwa (Winner)	114,284	PML-N
Khalil Ahmed Arrain	97,871	IND. (PTI Supported Candidate)
Muhammad Allah Dad Cheema	24,440	PML-Z
Muhammad Athar	14,094	TLP
Mian Muhammad Ali Laleka	8,720	PPP
Imran Hussain Chattha	1,697	IND
Muhammad Ijaz Ul Haq	1,641	IND
Suraiya Sultana	1,012	IND
Iftkhar Nadeem	948	JIP
Asad Ali Khan	580	IND
Khadija Khanum	472	IND
Khalid Hussain	437	IND
Kashif Sana	356	IND
Mariam Tahir	255	IND
Ghulam Murtaza	216	IND
Shahzad Mahmood	192	IND
Zafar Iqbal Chaudhry	70	IND
Aman Ullah Bajwa	-	IND
Source: Election Commission of Pakistan

Provincial Assembly PP-243 (Bahawalnagar-VII)
Candidates	Votes	Party
Zahid Akram (Winner)	48,555	PML-N
Khadija Khanum	46,342	IND. (PTI Supported Candidate)
Kashif Sana	34,003	PML-Z
Muhammad Naseer Mohyee Ud Din	9,532	TLP
Khalid Farooq	4,816	IND
Nasir Mehmood	575	JIP
Muhammad Naeem	522	IND
Amdad Hussain	185	IND
Muhammad Usman Ghani	181	IND
Fakhar Uz Zaman	133	MML
Muhammad Noman Latif	125	IND
Shahid Imran	94	IND
Source: Election Commission of Pakistan

1. In General Elections 2018 Ch. Ihsan ul Haq Bajwa elected as Member of National Assembly from constituency NA-168 and Ch. Zahid Akram elected as Punjab Assembly from constituency PP-242.
2. In General Elections 2024 Ch. Ihsan ul Haq Bajwa elected as Member of National Assembly from constituency NA-162 Bahawalnagar-III and Ch. Zahid Akram elected as Punjab Assembly from constituency PP-243 Bahawalnagar-VII.
