= NA-161 Bahawalnagar-II =

Constituency of the National Assembly of Pakistan

- Constituency for the National Assembly of Pakistan
- Region: Chishtian Tehsil (partly) and Bahawalnagar Tehsil (partly) including Bahawalnagar city of Bahawalnagar District
- Electorate: 459,968

Current constituency
- Party: Pakistan Muslim League (N)
- Member: Alam Dad Lalika
- Created from: NA-189 Bahawalnagar-II

NA-161 Bahawalnagar-II (این اے-161، بہاولنگر-۲) is a constituency for the National Assembly of Pakistan.

== Election 2002 ==
General elections were held on 10 October 2002. Mian Mumtaz Ahmed Matiana of PPP won by 59,082 votes.

General election 2002: NA-189 Bahawalnagar-II
Party	Candidate	Votes	%	±%
PPP	Mian Mumtaz Ahmed Matiana	59,082	48.27	
MMA	Alam Ali Laleka	26,247	21.44	
PML(Q)	Syed Mumtaz Alam Gillani	25,564	20.88	
PML(N)	Dr. Noor Muhammad Ghafari	10,533	8.61	
Independent	Muhammed Ali Laleka	986	0.80	
Turnout		126,095	46.36	
Total valid votes		122,412	97.08	
Rejected ballots		3,683	2.92	
Majority		32,835	26.83	
Registered electors		271,965		

== Election 2008 ==
General elections were held on 18 February 2008. Syed Mumtaz Alam Gillani of PPP won by 49,678 votes.

General election 2008: NA-189 Bahawalnagar-II
Party	Candidate	Votes	%	±%
PPP	Syed Mumtaz Alam Gillani	49,678	38.49	
PML(N)	Dr. Mian Akhtar Ali Laleka	37,218	28.83	
PML(Q)	Shahida Sattar Laleka	35,787	27.73	
Others	Others (five candidates)	6,402	4.95	
Turnout		133,190	41.12	
Total valid votes		129,080	96.91	
Rejected ballots		4,110	3.09	
Majority		12,460	9.68	
Registered electors		323,939		
PPP hold				

== Election 2013 ==
General elections were held on 11 May 2013. Alam Dad Laleka of PML-N won by 95,060 votes and became the member of National Assembly.

General election 2013: NA-189 Bahawalnagar-II
Party	Candidate	Votes	%	±%
PML(N)	Alam Dad Lalika	95,060	53.22	
PTI	Mian Mumtaz Ahmed Matiana	46,686	26.14	
PPP	Dr. Mian Akhtar Ali Lalika	15,031	8.41	
Independent	Syed Ghulam Rasool Shah	12,118	6.78	
Others	Others (ten candidates)	9,735	5.45	
Turnout		185,459	59.98	
Total valid votes		178,630	96.32	
Rejected ballots		6,829	3.68	
Majority		48,374	27.08	
Registered electors		309,222		
PML(N) gain from PPP				

== Election 2018 ==
General elections were held on 25 July 2018.

General election 2018: NA-167 Bahawalnagar-II
Party	Candidate	Votes	%	±%
PML(N)	Alam Dad Lalika	91,540	43.65	
PTI	Mumtaz Matyana	49,772	23.73	
Independent	Muhammad Azam	22,098	10.54	
Independent	Shoukat Ali Laleka	12,016	5.73	
TLP	Syed Muzzammil Hussain Shah	10,224	4.88	
Independent	Muhammad Shahzad	6,359	3.03	
PPP	Syed Fazal Mehmmod Shah	4,852	2.31	
Independent	Muhammad Aslam	3,577	1.71	
Independent	Muhammad Akram Tahir	3,309	1.58	
MMA	Arslan Khan Khakwani	3,134	1.49	
Independent	Mian Mumtaz Ahmed	1,377	0.66	
PML(Z)	Ijaz-ul-Haq	831	0.40	
Independent	Muhammad Rauf	394	0.19	
Independent	Ishrat Begum	233	0.11	
Turnout		216,047	56.94	
Total valid votes		209,716	97.07	
Rejected ballots		6,331	2.93	
Majority		41,768	19.92	
Registered electors		379,417		

== Election 2024 ==
General elections were held on 8 February 2024. Alam Dad Lalika won the election with 100,679 votes.

General election 2024: NA-162 Bahawalnagar-II
Party	Candidate	Votes	%	±%
PML(N)	Alam Dad Lalika	100,679	41.51	▼2.14
PTI	Shahid Amin (Note: Filed nomination papers as PTI candidate but ECP allowed him to run as an Independent)	81,772	33.71	▲9.98
TLP	Aftab Ahmad Joiya	25,698	10.60	▲5.72
Others	Others (seventeen candidates)	34,997	14.43	
Turnout		248,974	54.13	▼2.81
Total valid votes		242,546	97.42	
Rejected ballots		6,428	2.58	
Majority		19,507	8.04	▼11.88
Registered electors		459,968		
PML(N) hold				

== See also ==
- NA-160 Bahawalnagar-I
- NA-162 Bahawalnagar-III
