= NA-162 Bahawalnagar-III =

Constituency of the National Assembly of Pakistan

- Constituency for the National Assembly of Pakistan
- Region: Chishtian Tehsil (partly) and Haroonabad Tehsil (partly) of Bahawalnagar District
- Electorate: 487,317

Current constituency
- Party: Pakistan Muslim League (N)
- Member: Ehsan Ul Haq Bajwa
- Created from: NA-190 Bahawalnagar-III

NA-162 Bahawalnagar-III (این اے-162، بہاولنگر-۳) is a constituency for the National Assembly of Pakistan.

== Election 2002 ==
General elections were held on 10 October 2002. Mian Abdul Sattar Khan of PML-Q won by 58,836 votes.

General election 2002: NA-190 Bahawalnagar-III
Party	Candidate	Votes	%	±%
PML(Q)	Abdul Sattar Khan	58,836	42.38	
PPP	Sajjad Ahmed Jathol	54,659	39.37	
PML(N)	Mian Muhammad Rafi	13,881	10.00	
MMA	Ahsan Bari Mian	7,488	5.39	
NA	Sahib Zada Noor Hassan	2,546	1.83	
Others	Others (three candidates)	1,422	1.03	
Turnout		142,146	50.54	
Total valid votes		138,832	97.67	
Rejected ballots		3,314	2.33	
Majority		4,177	3.01	
Registered electors		281,254		

== Election 2008 ==
General elections were held on 18 February 2008. Abdul Ghafoor Chaudhry of PPP won by 77,664 votes.

General election 2008: NA-190 Bahawalnagar-III
Party	Candidate	Votes	%	±%
PPP	Abdul Ghafoor Ch.	77,664	51.42	
PML(Q)	Tahir Bashir Cheema	70,081	46.40	
Others	Others (three candidates)	3,292	2.18	
Turnout		154,666	48.82	
Total valid votes		151,037	96.65	
Rejected ballots		3,629	3.25	
Majority		7,583	5.02	
Registered electors		316,829		
PPP gain from PML(Q)				

== Election 2013 ==
General elections were held on 11 May 2013. Tahir Bashir Cheema of PML-N won by 83,353 votes and became the member of National Assembly.

General election 2013: NA-190 Bahawalnagar-III
Party	Candidate	Votes	%	±%
PML(N)	Tahir Bashir Cheema	83,353	43.04	
PML(Z)	Muhammad Ijaz-Ul-Haq	49,170	25.39	
PTI	Malik Muhammad Muzaffar Khan	40,225	20.77	
Others	Others (eleven candidates)	20,901	10.80	
Turnout		200,397	61.83	
Total valid votes		193,649	96.63	
Rejected ballots		6,748	3.37	
Majority		34,183	17.65	
Registered electors		324,085		
PML(N) gain from PPP				

== Election 2018 ==
General elections were held on 25 July 2018. Ehsan Ul Haq Bajwa of PML-N won by 124,218 votes and became the member of National Assembly with highest votes lead of Pakistan.

General election 2018: NA-168 Bahawalnagar-III
Party	Candidate	Votes	%	±%
PML(N)	Ehsan Ul Haq Bajwa	124,447	54.57	
PTI	Fatima Tahir Cheema	74,993	32.89	
TLP	Khalil Ur Rehman	9,554	4.21	
Others	Others (six candidates)	18,993	8.33	
Turnout		232,189	57.70	
Total valid votes		228,026	98.21	
Rejected ballots		4,163	1.79	
Majority		49,701	21.80	
Registered electors		402,412		

== Election 2024 ==
General elections were held on 8 February 2024. Ehsan Ul Haq Bajwa won the election with 114,379 votes.

General election 2024: NA-162 Bahawalnagar-III
Party	Candidate	Votes	%	±%
PML(N)	Ehsan Ul Haq Bajwa	114,379	42.75	▼11.82
PTI	Khalil Ahmed (Note: Filed nomination papers as PTI candidate but ECP allowed him to run as an Independent)	97,980	36.62	▲3.73
PML(Z)	Muhammad Allah Dad Cheema	24,475	9.15	
TLP	Muhammad Athar	14,097	5.27	▲1.06
Others	Others (thirteen candidates)	16,600	6.20	
Turnout		272,707	55.96	▼1.74
Total valid votes		267,531	98.10	
Rejected ballots		5,176	1.90	
Majority		16,399	6.13	▼15.67
Registered electors		487,317		

== See also ==
- NA-161 Bahawalnagar-II
- NA-163 Bahawalnagar-IV
