= Khattan, Punjab =

Khattan کھاٹاں
- Village
- Location within Punjab, Pakistan Khattan (Pakistan)
- Coordinates: 29°40′32.988″N 73°10′53.472″E
- Country: Pakistan
- Province: Punjab
- District: Bahawalnagar
- Tehsil: Bahawalnagar
- Union Council: Khattan
- Post Office: Haroonabad

Government
  - Type: Union Council
- Elevation: 174 m (571 ft)

Population (2017)
  - Total: 9,731
  - Estimate (2024): 11,332
- Time zone: UTC+5 (PKT)

Khattan (Urdu: کھاٹاں) is a village located in the Bahawalnagar District of Punjab, Pakistan. It serves as the administrative center for the Khattan union council within Bahawalnagar Tehsil. The village is situated approximately 10.07 kilometers southwest of Dunga Bunga and 8.1 kilometers northeast of Haroonabad.

== Geography ==
Khattan is located in the southern part of Bahawalnagar Tehsil.

== Demographics ==
Historical population
Census	Pop.	Time span (yrs)	%±	Annual RoG %±
1951	4,310	—	—	—
1961	3,530	10	-18.1%	-1.98%
1972	4,349	11	23.2%	1.92%
1981	4,892	9	12.49%	1.32%
1998	6,431	17	31.46%	1.62%
2017	9,731	19	51.31%	2.2%
2024 (est)	11,332	7	16.45%	2.2%
