= Shaukat Basra =

Pakistani politician

- شوکت بسرا

Member of the Provincial Assembly of the Punjab
- In office 2008–2013
- Preceded by: Chaudhry Ghulam Murtaza
- Succeeded by: Chaudhry Ghulam Murtaza
- Constituency: PP-283 (Bahawalnagar-VII)

Personal details
- Born: Chaudhry Shaukat Mahmood Basra; 1 March 1966 (age 60) Bahawalpur, Punjab, Pakistan
- Party: PTI (2017-present)
- Other political affiliations: PPP (2008-2017)
- Relatives: Naveed Iqbal Sajid (cousin)
- Occupation: Politician; Lawyer

Shaukat Mahmood Basra (Urdu: شوکت محمود بسرا; born 1 March 1966) is a Pakistani lawyer and politician who was a member of the Provincial Assembly of the Punjab from 2008 to 2013.

== Early life and education ==
Shaukat Mahmood Basra was born on 1 March 1966 in Bahawalpur, Pakistan to Nabi Ahmad Basra.

He obtained a Bachelor of Arts degree and a Bachelor of Laws degree from the University of Karachi and is a qualified advocate. Basra hails from the town of Haroonabad in the Bahawalnagar District of Punjab.

== Political career ==
=== Pakistan Peoples Party ===
Basra began his career in politics as a tehsil president in 1996, as a member of the Pakistan Peoples Party (PPP). He contested in the 2008 Punjab provincial election from constituency PP-283 (Bahawalnagar-VII) on behalf of the parliamentarians wing of the PPP. He received 43,279 votes and defeated Chaudhry Ghulam Murtaza of the PML-Q, thus becoming an elected member of the 15th provincial assembly and taking oath on 9 April 2008. He remained in office until 2013. During his tenure, Basra served as a Parliamentary Secretary from January 2009 to February 2011 and was also a member of the Special Committee for Finance.

In the 2013 Punjab provincial election, Basra contested once again from the same constituency on a PPP ticket. He received 11,525 votes and lost to Chaudhry Ghulam Murtaza contesting on behalf of the PML-Z this time, placing third in the poll behind runner-up Ashraf-ul-Islam of the PML-N.

In the 2018 general election, Basra contested for a seat in the National Assembly from constituency NA-169 Bahawalnagar-IV as an independent candidate. He received 52,068 votes and lost to Noorul Hassan Tanvir of the PML-N, placing third behind runner-up Ijaz-ul-Haq of the PML-Z.

During his time with the PPP, Basra worked as the information secretary for the PPP's South Punjab chapter.

=== Pakistan Tehreek-e-Insaf ===
In December 2018, Basra parted ways with the PPP and announced that he had joined the Pakistan Tehreek-e-Insaf (PTI).

== Personal life ==
=== Family ===
Basra is married and has one child.

His cousin, Col (Retd) Naveed Iqbal Sajid, was also a member of the Punjab provincial assembly.

=== Attack by gunfire ===
In February 2017, Basra suffered serious gunshot injuries en route to a political rally in Haroonabad, while his personal assistant was killed. The attack occurred when a heated conflict broke out between rival members of the PPP and PML-Z.

Provincial Assembly of the Punjab
Preceded by Chaudhry Ghulam Murtaza	Member for PP-283 (Bahawalnagar-VII); 2008–2013	Succeeded by Chaudhry Ghulam Murtaza
