= NA-163 Bahawalnagar-IV =

Constituency of the National Assembly of Pakistan

- Constituency for the National Assembly of Pakistan
- Region: Fort Abbas Tehsil and Haroonabad Tehsil (partly) including Haroonabad city of Bahawalnagar District
- Electorate: 488,700

Current constituency
- Party: Pakistan Muslim League (Z)
- Member: Ijaz-ul-Haq
- Created from: NA-191 Bahawalnagar-IV

NA-163 Bahawalnagar-IV (این اے-163، بہاولنگر-4) is a constituency for the National Assembly of Pakistan.

== Members of Parliament ==
=== 2018–2023: NA-169 Bahawalnagar-IV ===
Election	Member	Party
2018	Noor Ul Hassan Tanvir	PML(N)

=== 2024–present: NA-163 Bahawalnagar-IV ===
Election	Member	Party
2024	Ijaz-ul-Haq	PML(Z)

== Election 2002 ==
General elections were held on 10 October 2002. Muhammad Ijaz Ul Haq of PML-Z won by 55,109 votes.

General election 2002: NA-191 Bahawalnagar-IV
Party	Candidate	Votes	%	±%
PML(Z)	Ijaz-ul-Haq	55,109	36.17	
PPP	Muhammad Afzal Sindhu	45,478	29.85	
PML(Q)	Ch. Abdul Ghafoor	43,739	28.71	
MMA	Mian Khalil Ahmed	6,926	4.55	
PML(N)	Muhammad Yar Khan	1,098	0.72	
Turnout		155,361	51.20	
Total valid votes		152,350	98.06	
Rejected ballots		3,011	1.94	
Majority		9,631	6.32	
Registered electors		303,421		

== Election 2008 ==
General elections were held on 18 February 2008. Muhammad Afzal Sindhu of PPP won by 83,903 votes.

General election 2008: NA-191 Bahawalnagar-IV
Party	Candidate	Votes	%	±%
PPP	Muhammad Afzal Sindhu	83,903	49.79	
PML(Q)	Ijaz-ul-Haq	79,283	47.05	
Others	Others (four candidates)	5,314	3.16	
Turnout		172,502	47.56	
Total valid votes		168,500	97.68	
Rejected ballots		4,002	2.32	
Majority		4,620	2.74	
Registered electors		362,672		
PPP gain from PML(Q)				

== Election 2013 ==
General elections were held on 11 May 2013. Ijaz-ul-Haq of PML-Z won by 79,306 votes and became the member of National Assembly.

General election 2013: NA-191 Bahawalnagar-IV
Party	Candidate	Votes	%	±%
PML(Z)	Ijaz-ul-Haq	79,306	38.47	
PML(N)	Mian Abdul Rasheed	55,037	26.70	
Independent	Khalid Hussain	35,223	17.09	
PPP	Dr. Mazhar Iqbal Ch.	18,377	8.91	
Others	Others (thirteen candidates)	18,200	8.83	
Turnout		212,004	64.84	
Total valid votes		206,143	97.24	
Rejected ballots		5,861	2.76	
Majority		24,269	11.77	
Registered electors		326,972		
PML(Z) gain from PPP				

== Election 2018 ==
General elections were held on 25 July 2018.

General election 2018: NA-169 Bahawalnagar-IV
Party	Candidate	Votes	%	±%
PML(N)	Noor Ul Hassan Tanvir	91,763	37.79	
PML(Z)	Ijaz ul Haq	72,461	29.84	
Independent	Shaukat Basra	52,050	21.43	
Others	Others (eight candidates)	26,558	10.94	
Turnout		247,781	60.34	
Total valid votes		242,832	98.00	
Rejected ballots		4,949	2.00	
Majority		19,302	7.95	
Registered electors		410,644		
PML(N) gain from PML(Z)				

== Election 2024 ==
General elections were held on 8 February 2024. Ijaz-ul-Haq won the election with 84,343 votes.

General election 2024: NA-163 Bahawalnagar-IV
Party	Candidate	Votes	%	±%
PML(Z)	Ijaz-ul-Haq	84,343	30.71	▲0.87
PTI	Shaukat Basra (Note: Filed nomination papers as PTI candidate but ECP allowed him to run as an Independent)	75,198	27.38	
PML(N)	Noorul Hassan Tanvir	72,182	26.28	▼11.51
Others	Others (sixteen candidates)	42,960	15.64	
Turnout		280,026	57.30	▼3.04
Total valid votes		274,683	98.09	
Rejected ballots		5,343	1.91	
Majority		9,145	3.33	
Registered electors		488,700		
PML(Z) gain from PTI				

== See also ==
- NA-162 Bahawalnagar-III
- NA-164 Bahawalpur-I
