= Mir Garh Fort =

Historic fortification in Punjab, Pakistan

- قلعہ میر گڑھ
- Interactive map of the Mir Garh Fort area

General information
- Type: Fortification
- Location: Cholistan Desert, Fort Abbas Tehsil, Bahawalnagar District, Punjab, Pakistan
- Coordinates: 29°10′27″N 72°37′16″E
- Construction started: 1799 CE
- Completed: 1803 CE
- Owner: Government of Punjab

Height
- Height: 28 ft (8.5 m)

Technical details
- Material: Mud brick and burnt brick

Design and construction
- Architect: –
- Developer: Abbasi Daudpotra clan

Mir Garh Fort (Urdu: قلعہ میر گڑھ, also transliterated Meergarh or Mirgarh) is a late-eighteenth-century desert fortress in the Cholistan Desert of Fort Abbas tehsil, Bahawalnagar District, Punjab, Pakistan. Constructed of mud and burnt brick, the fort stands about 9–15 km west of Fort Abbas and roughly 130 km south-east of Bahawalpur. It forms one link in a chain of Abbasi forts that once guarded caravan traffic along the now-dry course of the Hakra River.

== History ==
Mir Garh Fort was commissioned by Nūr Muḥammad Khan, son of Jām Khan Marūfānī of the Abbasi Daudpotra clan, in 1799 CE (1214 AH) and, by local tradition, finished in 1803. Mir Garh's primary role was to secure a segment of the east–west caravan road that paralleled the Hakra; together with Jam Garh, Moj Garh and Derawar Fort, it formed a gridded defensive network across Cholistan.

A 2020 survey by the Punjab Department of Archaeology counted Mir Garh among 13 extant Cholistan forts and recommended emergency conservation. Since the abolition of the princely state of Bahawalpur in 1955, the site has received little maintenance. A government heritage handbook issued in 2023 again highlighted the fort's "huge tourism potential" but classed its condition as "critical".

== Architecture ==
Mir Garh is broadly square in plan. Its mud-and-brick curtain rises about 8.5 m and is strengthened at the four corners by rounded bastions that early-twentieth-century oral tradition called minārāt (towers). The fort is entered from the east through a single gateway with a two-stage barbican: the outer door once bore iron spikes, while the inner passage leads to a vaulted deorhī and an open central courtyard.

Contemporary architectural surveys note the use of locally fired bricks bedded in clay mortar, a technique shared with neighbouring Abbasi forts. Narrow slit-niches pierce the inner faces of the bastions to light guard rooms, and patches of lime-plaster survive in sheltered spots. Within the courtyard stood domestic quarters and two sweet-water wells, an exceptional amenity in the arid Rohi, but both houses and wells have collapsed or filled with drifting sand.

Only four angle-towers are visible today. A late-colonial cadastral sketch reproduced in the 2023 handbook suggests that the original scheme may have included nine bastions, indicating later loss of intermediate towers, although no archaeological excavation has confirmed this.

== Conservation status ==
Weather-sculpted clay ramparts give the fort a stark silhouette, but conservationists warn that without urgent consolidation of wall cores and improved drainage for monsoon run-off, Mir Garh may join numerous vanished mud forts whose outlines are now mere mounds on the Cholistan horizon.
