= Dunga Bunga =

- Town
- ڈُونگہ بُونگہ
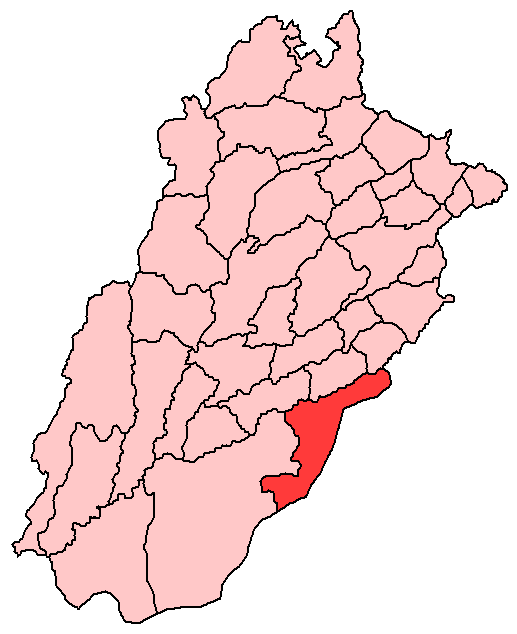

- Location within Pakistan
- Coordinates: 29.45°N 73.15°E
- Country: Pakistan
- Elevation: 154 m (505 ft)

Population
  - Estimate (2006): 100,000
- Time zone: UTC+5 (PST)
- Calling code: 063

Dunga Bunga (Urdu: ڈُونگہ بُونگہ), is a town in Bahawalnagar District in the Punjab province, Pakistan. It located on the Bahawalnagar-Fort Abbas road 27.5 km (17.1 mi) away from Bahawalnagar. 18 km (11 mi) away from Haroonabad. 38 km (24 mi) away from Faqirwali. 58 km (36 mi) away from Khichiwala. 77 km (48 mi) away from Fort Abbas. The city hosts the Union Council of Bahawalnagar Tehsil and is located near to the city of Bahawalnagar at 29°45'0 N 73°15'0 E at an altitude of 154 metres (505 ft). It lies on the Haroonabad-Bahawalnagar road.

The population of Dunga Bunga is around 100,000 according to the 2006 census. Dunga Bunga has more than 50 neighboring villages. The nearest towns are Soondha Soondha town is nearest the border and is a modern village, Gulab Ali, Bara Akuka Dinan Bishnoian Wala (Urdu: دینن بشنوئیاں والہ), Rasulpura, Khraj Purah, Sundar Bishnoian, Hira Bishnoi, Bajak, Deputy Cart, Basti Islam Pura, khaima wala.

== Etymology ==
The name Dunga Bunga is Hindustani. Dunga means downside and bunga means locality. The name is also associated with two Sikh brothers named Dunga Singh and Bunga Singh.

== History ==
• Prior to partition of subcontinent Dunga Bunga was populated by Bishnoi Caste of Hindus and were known as Bahawalpuri Bishnois (i.e. Bishnois of Bahawalpur Riyasat). The farmers and workers were mostly Ramgarhia Sikhs.

• The Proud and Wealthy community of Bishnois built many Temples in there Native Towns and Villages and were principally Large Landlords.

• Jains and Aroras were Traders and Bankers and entire business was in their Hands.

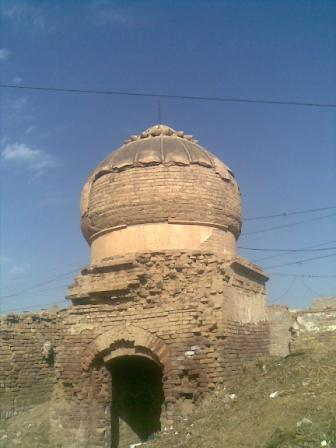
Historic Pre-Partition Jain Temple in Dunga Bunga.

• Dunga Bunga is very close to the Indian border.

== 2003 Unrest Incident ==
In 2003 unrest broke out in the town when hospital officials refused to conduct an autopsy on a Tonga driver. The family of the driver were believed to have been treated badly and this resulted in mob violence and police retaliation. By the time calm was restored, 19 police officials were reported injured, a labourer and shopkeeper were killed, and five others were seriously injured. These five were taken to a hospital in Bahawalpur, the district capital.

== Municipal committee ==
=== Main Dunga Bunga ===
The main area of this union council includes Union Council Dunga Bunga. Nearby villages are Basti Kuleran Wali, Sundarw Bishnoi (Sundarwali), Dinan Bishnoian Wala, Hira Bishnoi, Denun Maharanawali, Khirajpura, Rasoolpura, Soondha, Bajak, Basti Islam Pura and Gulab Ali.

=== Dunga Bishnoian ===
Dunga Bishnoian includes the Mohala Labana wala far behind Dunga Bunga Bypass. It starts at qureshi chowk and ends at the bypass of Dunga Bunga from the Gulab Ali side. Janaza-Gah and Mohalla Qasaiyan wala also includes in it. Disposal road and Gujjar House also in it. Road length 10 km

- Rest House Colony is known as Daman Pura is also attach with Dunga Bishnoian. It is opposite from Rest House Dunga Bunga.

=== Dunga Akuka ===
Dunga Akuka consists of the Akuka area. It starts at the main city bazaar of Dunga Bunga include Mohallah Masjid Mahajreen.

== Educational institutions ==
- Islamia Public Science High School, Dunga Dunga
- Government Higher Secondary School Dunga Bunga
- City Public High School (PEEF)
- Allied School Jamsheed Campus
- Fauji Foundation Model School, Dunga Bunga
- paramount Public School (PEEF)
- Global Islamic Public School
- Bismillah Public Science School
- Scholar Science Academy
- Grace Public School Nai Abadi Dunga Bunga principal Shahid Hussain
- Pioneer Public High School Dunga Bunga principal is Muhammad Waqas Hafeez Rao
- Dunga public school Dunga bunga (PEF) Principal Rao Muhammad Afaq

== Medical facilities ==
1.RHC 2.Sohail Surgical Hospital 3.Family Hospital 4.The Doctor Clinic

== Social organization ==
Ujala Foundation is the only organization working in the area since 2006. Ujala Foundation is working for "Social Change Through Education". Al Maqsood Education Academy is also doing valuable services for the poor students of the locality by providing free books and free coaching facility.

== Media and news ==
Voice of Dunga Bunga is the news channel working in the area since 2018.

== Main places ==
1.Grid Station 2.Canal Rest House 3.Govt HSS Dunga Bunga 4.Sohail Surgical Hospital 5.Town Committee

== Banks ==
Muslim Commercial Bank Ltd. (MCB Bank), Habib Bank Ltd., National Bank of Pakistan Ltd., Zari Taraqiyati Bank Ltd., Akhuwat Microfinance Bank, United Bank Limited, Bank Al-Habib

== Martyrs of Armed Forces ==
Rao Atif Sardar Shaheed DOS 26/11/2018, Rao Asif Mehfooz Shaheed DOS 04/02/2018, Rao Shahid Baboo Shaheed 07/08/2021.Niaz Ahamd Joyia Elite Force.
