= Chak 38 3R =

Chak 38/3-R Arainpura
- Village
- Location within Pakistan
- Coordinates: 29°35′59″N 72°56′46″E
- Country: Pakistan
- Region: Punjab Province
- District: Bahawalnagar District
- Tehsil: Haroonabad Tehsil
- Union Council: Chak 30/3-R

Population
  - Total: 4,000
- Time zone: UTC+5 (PKT)
- Dialling code: 063

Chak 38/3-R is a village of Haroonabad Tehsil in Bahawalnagar District in the Punjab province of Pakistan. It is situated on Dahranwala Haroonabad Road and is well connected with other cities. Chak 38/3-R is situated 20 km from Haroonabad and 10 km from Dahranwala

There is Government High School for Boys which is one of the oldest in area and was established in 1932 and High School for Girls which was established in 1958. There is also a Basic Health Unit in Chak 38/3-R.

== Gallery ==
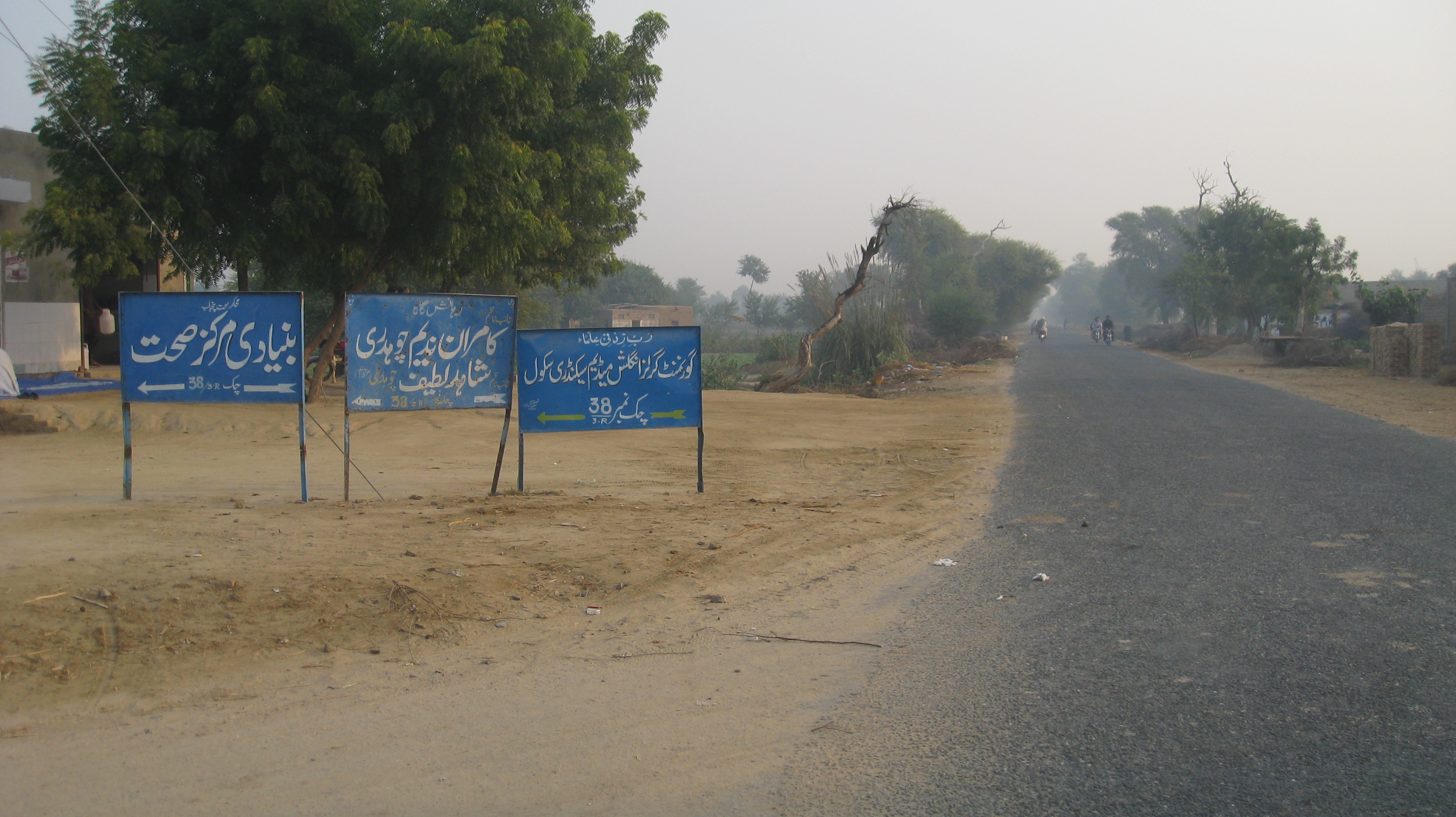
Haroonabad Dahranwala Road

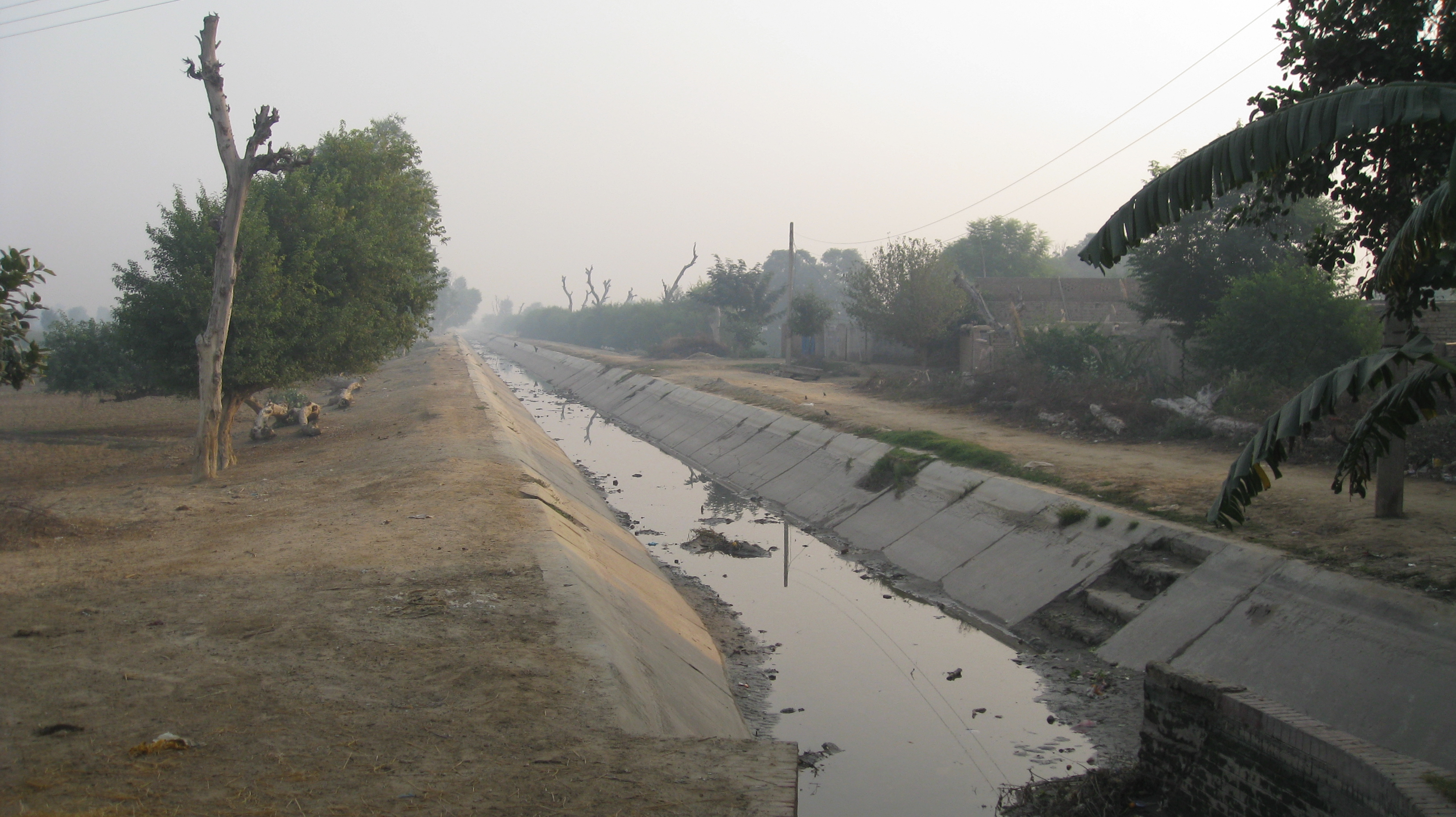
3R Distributory

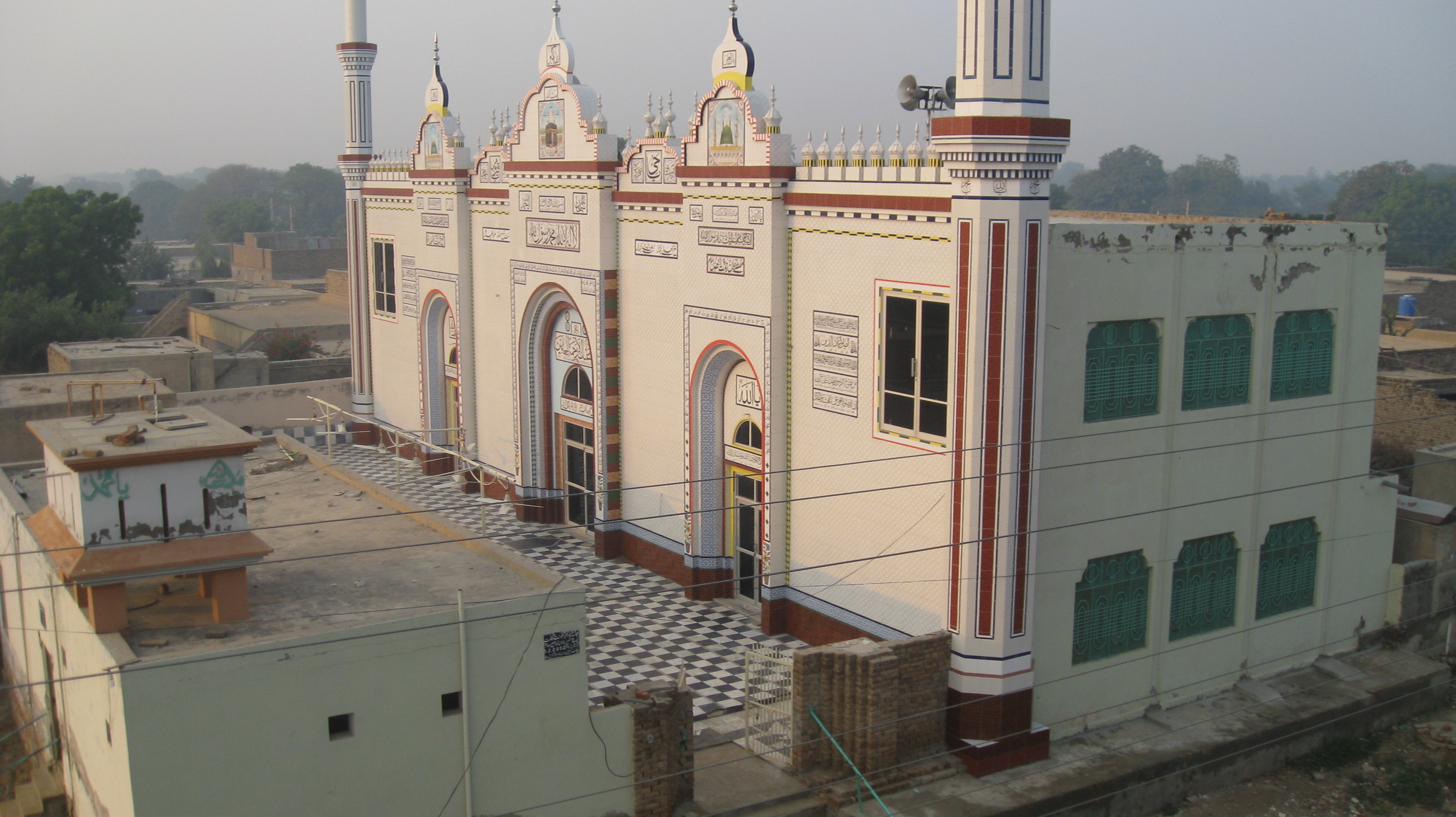
Jamia Masjid, Chak 38/3-R

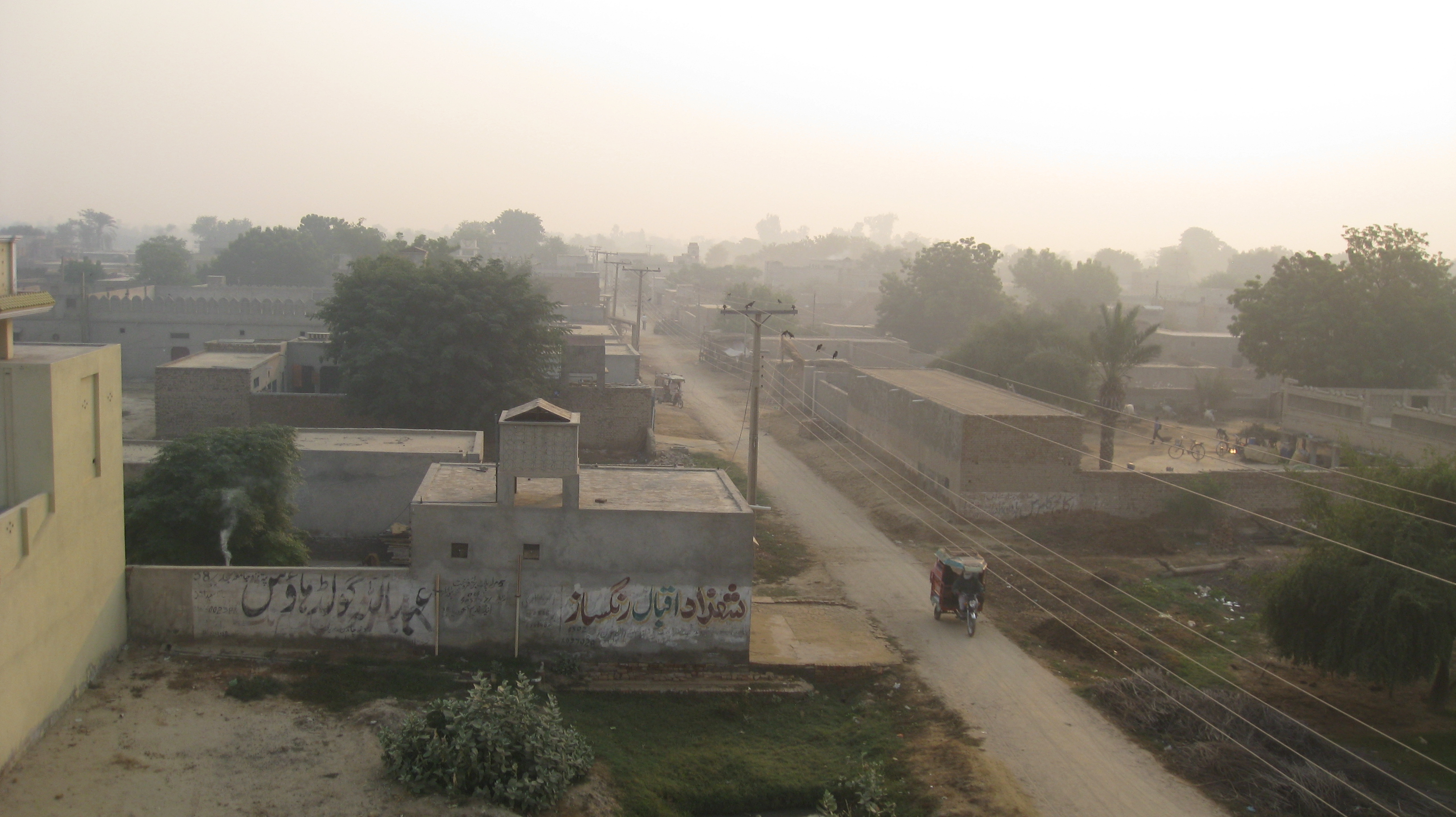
Aerial view of Chak 38/3-R

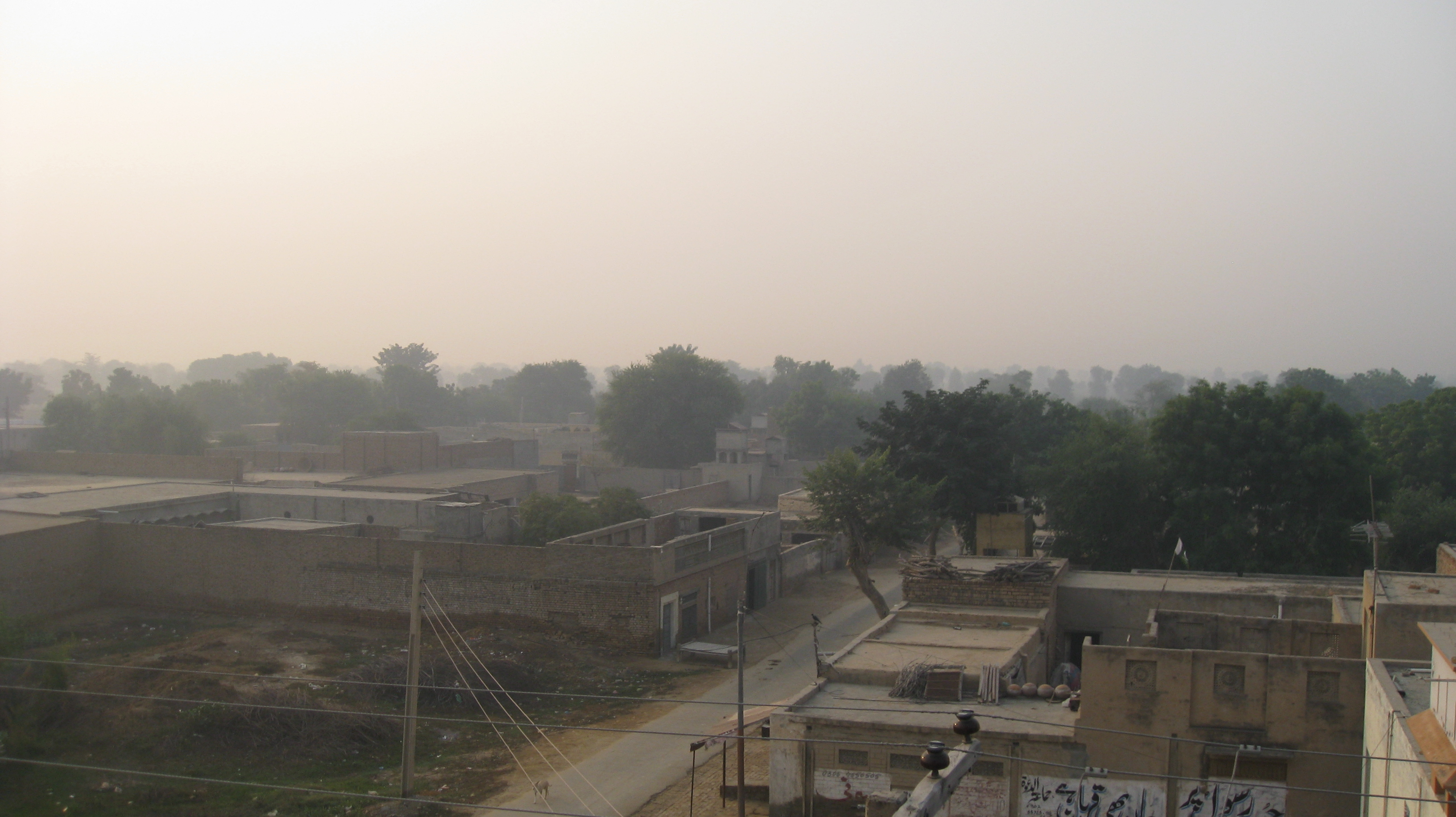
Aerial view of Chak 38/3-R

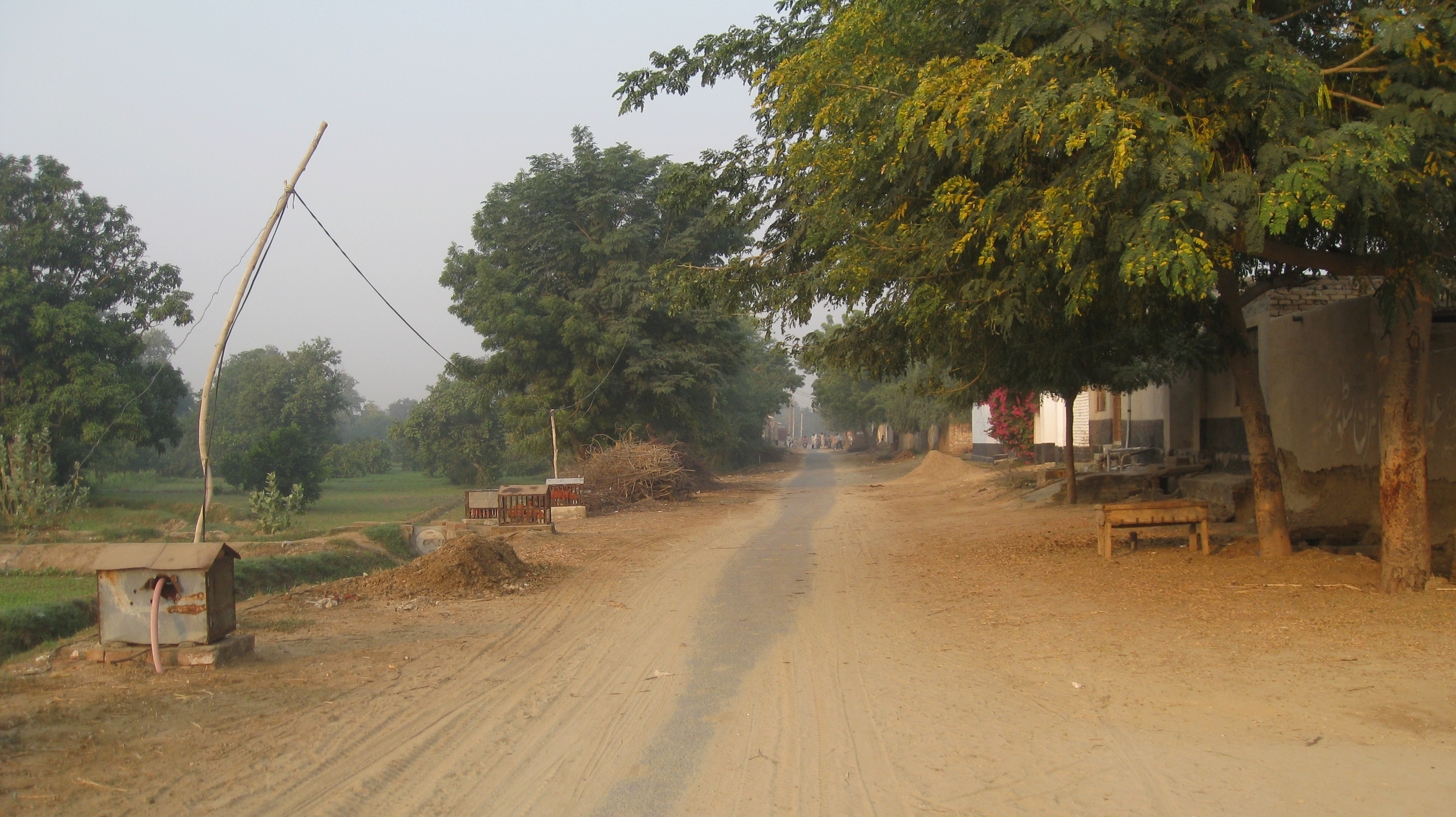
Road at Chak 38/3-R

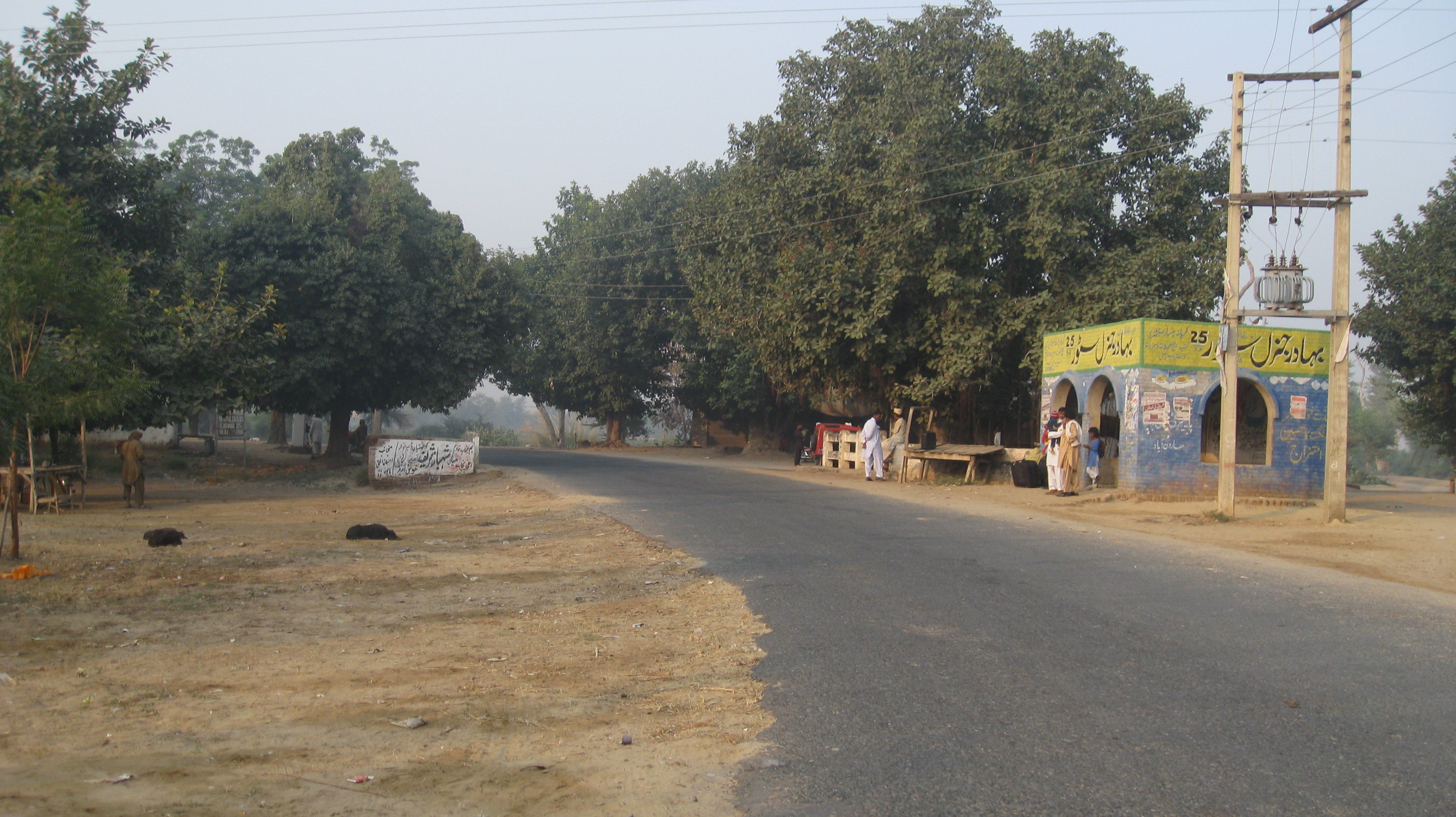
Do Shakha

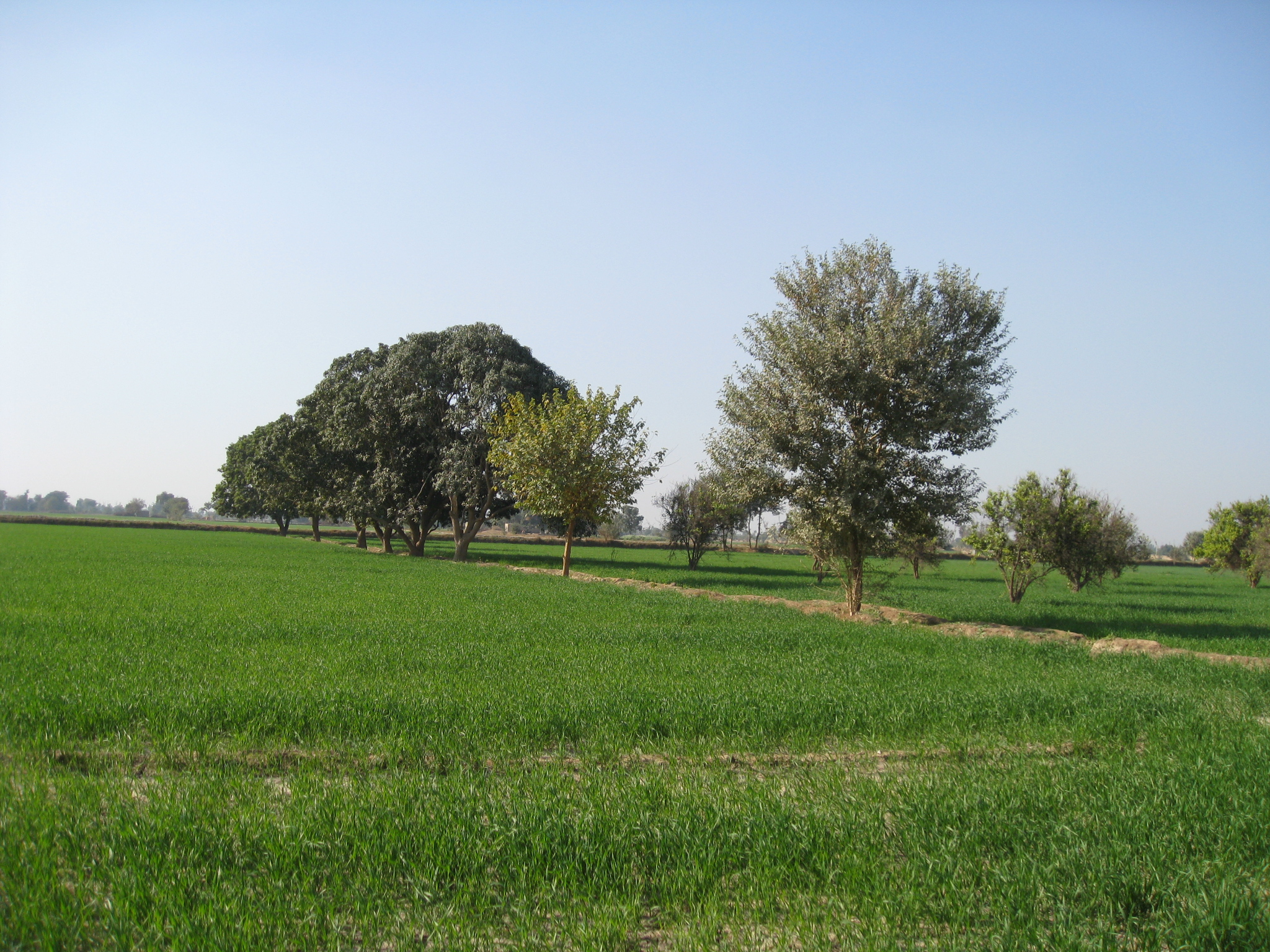
Fields near Chak 38/3-R

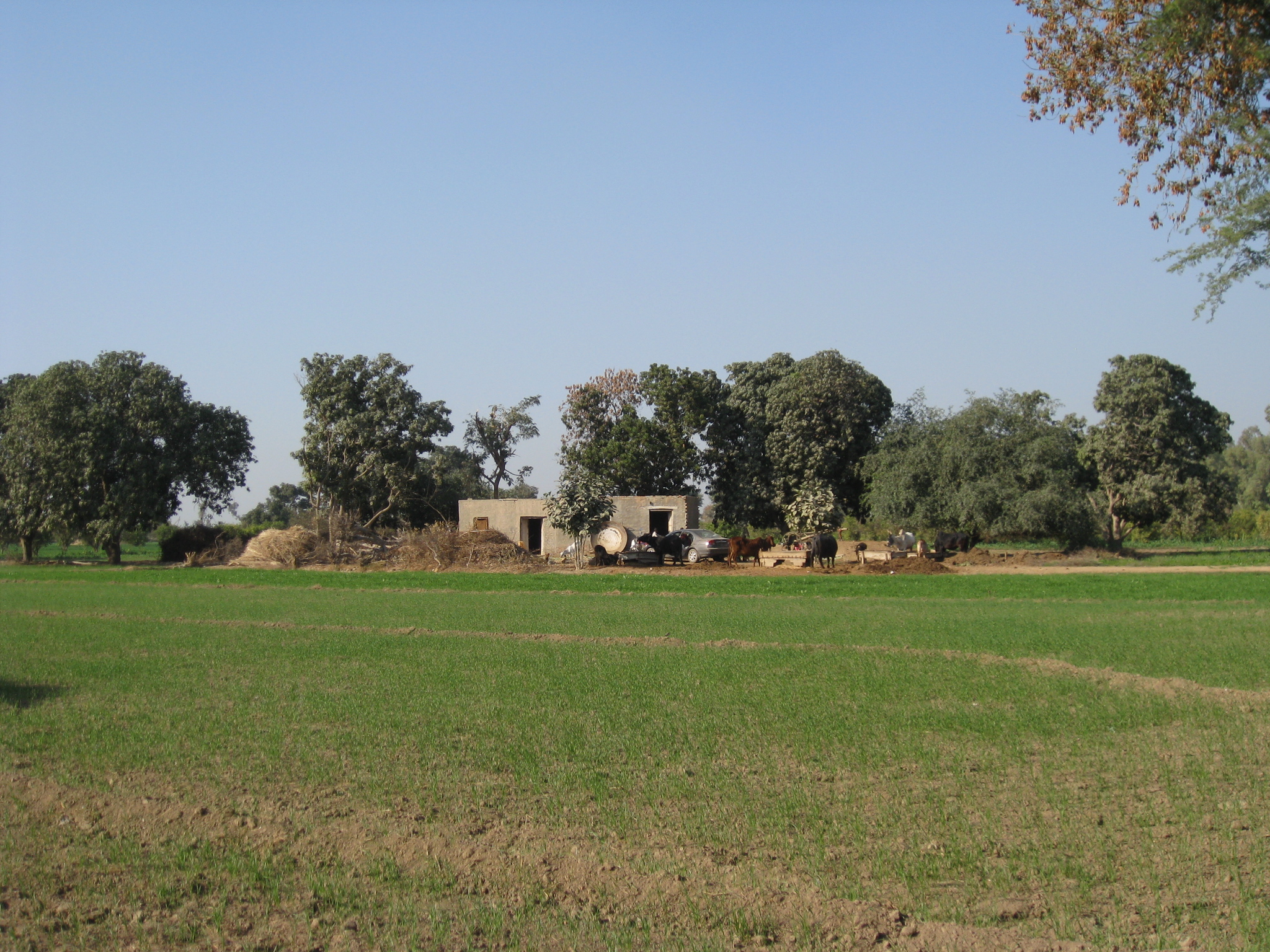
Dera near Chak 38/3-R
