= Daanish =

Daanish might refer to:

People

- Daanish Zahid, convicted of the racially motivated murder of Kriss Donald (the first person to be convicted of racially motivated murder in Scotland)

Organisations

- Daanish Schools, an education project in Pakistan
