= Tajana =

Agricultural village in Punjab, Pakistan

Tajana (also called Tajana Mandal) is a village, situated in Bahawalnagar District, Punjab, Pakistan. It consists of 500 homes. The most common profession of the people is agriculture. 70% of the total agricultural land depends on rain water. There are no other sources of the water there.
