= Dinan Bashnoian Wala =

Dinan Bishnoian Wala
- Town
- دینن بشنوئیاں والہ

- Location within Pakistan
- Coordinates: 29.76°N 73.26°E
- Country: Pakistan
- Elevation: 155 m (509 ft)

Population
  - Estimate (2006): 7,500
- Time zone: UTC+5 (PST)
- Calling code: 0632

Dinan Bashnoian Wala is a city in Bahawalnagar district in Punjab, Pakistan.
