= Moj Garh Fort =

Fort in Cholistan, Pakistan

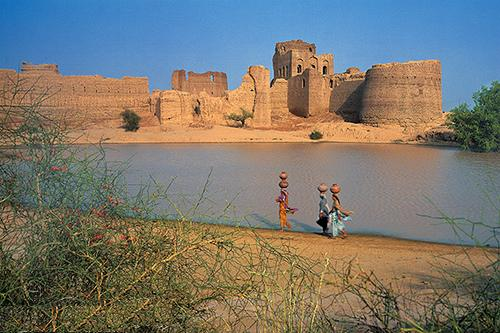
- Interactive map of the Moj Garh Fort area

General information
- Location: Cholistan, Punjab, Pakistan
- Coordinates: 29°00′48″N 72°08′24″E
- Estimated completion: 1743

Moj Garh Fort is a historic fort, about 70 km (43 mi) from Bahawalnagar city, along the Yazman–Fort Abbas road in Thandi Khoi, in the Bahawalnagar District of Punjab, Pakistan. It is located in the Cholistan Desert near the border with India.

== History ==
Moj Garh Fort was constructed by Emperor Maroof Khan Kehrani in 1743 AD. It was built using solid bricks and mud and was decorated with glazed tiles. A dome was constructed 370 m (400 yd) south of the fort.

== Preservation ==
By the turn of the century, Moj Garh Fort had collapsed, and only its crumbled structure remains. The Desert Rangers have since taken over the fort and initiated preservation and rehabilitation efforts.

The exterior and interior facing bricks of the fortification wall are missing in several places, exposing the underlying mud-brick pit. Despite the damage, about half of the relics have survived, with the exterior wall and interior structure still prominently visible.
