= Chak 92-6/R =

Village in Pakistan

Chak 92-6/R is a Pakistani village in Bahawal pur divisions, Bahawalnagar District, Tehsil Haroonabad. The villagers practice intensive farming.

Most of the villagers have their own cattle, cows, sheep, buffaloes and goats. The major crops are cotton, wheat, and sugar cane. The land of village is very fertile, irrigated by canal water and tube wells. The people wear shalwar kameez. Punjabi is the primary language. Most villagers live in mud houses, but the land owners have brick houses.
