= Chaudhry Ghulam Murtaza =

Pakistani politician

Member of the Provincial Assembly of the Punjab
- Incumbent
- Assumed office 18 February 2024
- Constituency: PP-283 Bahawalnagar-VII
- In office 29 May 2013 – 31 May 2018
- Constituency: PP-283 Bahawalnagar-VII
- In office 25 November 2002 – 17 November 2007
- Constituency: PP-283 Bahawalnagar-VII

Personal details
- Born: 6 March 1977 (age 49) Bahawalnagar, Punjab, Pakistan
- Party: PML(Z) (2002-preaent)

Chaudhry Ghulam Murtaza is a Pakistani politician who is a sitting Member of the Provincial Assembly of the Punjab since February 2024 for the 3rd term. Previously he was a Member of the Provincial Assembly of the Punjab, from November 2002 to November 2007 and again from May 2013 to May 2018.

== Early life and education ==
He was born on 6 March 1977 in Bahawalnagar.

He graduated in Bachelor of Commerce in 2000 from Punjab College of Commerce, Lahore.

== Political career ==
He was elected to the Provincial Assembly of the Punjab as a candidate of Pakistan Muslim League (Z) (PML-Z) from Constituency PP-283 (Bahawalnagar-VII) in the 2002 Pakistani general election. He received 35,015 votes and defeated Irfan Shaukat, a candidate of Pakistan Muslim League (Q) (PML-Q).

He ran for the seat of the Provincial Assembly of the Punjab as a candidate of PML-Q from Constituency PP-283 (Bahawalnagar-VII) in the 2008 Pakistani general election but was unsuccessful. He received 38,279 votes and lost the seat to Shaukat Mahmood Basra, a candidate of Pakistan Peoples Party (PPP).

He was re-elected to the Provincial Assembly of the Punjab as a candidate of PML-Z from Constituency PP-283 (Bahawalnagar-VII) in the 2013 Pakistani general election. He received 43,337 votes and defeated Ashraf Ul Islam, a candidate of Pakistan Muslim League (N) (PML-N).
