= Alam Dad Lalika =

Pakistani politician

- عالم داد لالیکا

Member of the National Assembly of Pakistan
- Incumbent
- Assumed office 29 February 2024
- Constituency: NA-161 Bahawalnagar-II
- In office 13 August 2018 – 10 August 2023
- Constituency: NA-167 (Bahawalnagar-II)
- In office 1 June 2013 – 31 May 2018
- Constituency: NA-189 (Bahawalnagar-II)

Personal details
- Born: 12 March 1987 (age 39) Bahawalngar, Punjab, Pakistan
- Party: PMLN (2013-present)

Alam Dad Lalika (Urdu: عالم داد لالیکا; born 12 March 1987) is a Pakistani politician who has been a member of the National Assembly of Pakistan since February 2024 and previously served in this position from August 2018 till August 2023 and from June 2013 to May 2018. He is the son of Mian Abdul Sattar Laleka who was also a prominent figure of PML(N) and was close to Nawaz Sharif. Alam Dad Laleka gained much popularity in the constituency in the early years after his father’s passing.

== Early life ==
He was born on 12 March 1987. Grew up in Lahore, at a young age he enjoyed cars and was keen on them. Having to deal with his father's death especially at a very young age and taking on the responsibilities that came with it was a big challenge.

== Political career ==
He was elected to the National Assembly of Pakistan as a candidate of Pakistan Muslim League (N) (PML-N) from Constituency NA-189 (Bahawalnagar-II) in the 2013 Pakistani general election. He received 95,060 votes and defeated Mian Mumtaz Ahmad Matyana, a candidate of Pakistan Tehreek-e-Insaf (PTI). During his tenure as Member of the National Assembly, he served as Federal Parliamentary Secretary for Communications.

In April 2018, reportedly he quit PML-N but this report turned out to be fake. However he rejected the claims.

He was re-elected to the National Assembly as a candidate of PML-N from NA-167 (Bahawalnagar-II) in the 2018 Pakistani general election. He received 91,540 votes and defeated Mian Mumtaz Ahmad Matyana, a candidate of PTI.

He was re-elected to the National Assembly as a candidate of PML-N from NA-161 Bahawalnagar-II in the 2024 Pakistani general election. He received 100,679 votes and defeated Shahid Amin, an Independent politician candidate supported by PTI.
