= Jenjeranwali =

- Town
- Location in Pakistan
- Coordinates: 29°55′42″N 73°22′42″E
- Country: Pakistan
- Region: Punjab
- District: Bahawalnagar District
- Time zone: UTC+5 (PST)
  - Summer (DST): UTC+6 (PDT)

Janjaranwali or Jenjeranwali (Urdu: جنجراں والی), is a town in Bahawalnagar District in Punjab, Pakistan on the bank of the Hakra canal, near the Indian border. Residents of Basti serve in various government departments like the Pakistan Civil Aviation Authority, Army, and the Public Health Engineering Department.
