= Chaudhry Zahid Akram =

Pakistani politician

Member of the Provincial Assembly of the Punjab
- In office 15 August 2018 – 14 January 2023
- Constituency: PP-242 Bahawalnagar-VI
- In office 29 May 2013 – 31 May 2018

Personal details
- Born: 21 October 1962 (age 64) Chishtian, Punjab, Pakistan
- Party: PMLN (2013-present)

Chaudhry Zahid Akram is a Pakistani politician who was a Member of the Provincial Assembly of the Punjab, from May 2013 to May 2018 and from August 2018 to January 2023.

== Early life and education ==
He was born on 21 October 1982 in 140 Murad.

He has completed Primary pass education.

== Political career ==
He was elected to the Provincial Assembly of the Punjab as a candidate of Pakistan Muslim League (Nawaz) (PML-N) from Constituency PP-282 (Bahawalnagar-VI) in the 2013 Pakistani general election.

He was re-elected to Provincial Assembly of the Punjab as a candidate of PML-N from Constituency PP-242 (Bahawalnagar-VI) in 2018 Pakistani general election.
