= Daanish Schools =

Public school in Pakistan

Daanish School

Location
- Chishtian, Hasilpur, Rahim Yar Khan, Rajanpur, Dera Ghazi Khan, Mianwali, Attock and Vehari, Mankera, Taunsa; 33°43′15.99″N 73°2′0.38″E

Information
- Type: Public
- Established: 2010
- Chairman: Chief Minister of Punjab
- Mascot: Daanians
- Affiliations: BISE of the Punjab
- Website: daanishschools.punjab.gov.pk

Daanish Schools are free education schools for underprivileged children in the Punjab.

Described as the brainchild of Shehbaz Sharif when he was the Chief Minister of Punjab, the schools admit 110 students annually in which 10 fee-paying students can also take admission out of total 110 students and the remaining 100 are admitted on merit and are offered free of cost education. The project of these schools was started in 2010. Students study in 20 daanish schools (10 for boys and 10 for girls). The school administration runs on the basis of an act uniquely established for these schools called The Daanish School Act passed by Provincial Assembly of the Punjab.

== Locations ==
Daanish schools are located at Chishtian, Hasilpur, Rahim Yar Khan, Mianwali, Rajanpur, Dera Ghazi Khan, Attock Vehari, Tandlianwala Faisalabad and Sialkot

== Area ==
Daanish School Rahim Yar khan is spread across 115 acres. Daanish School Hasilpur is spread across 400 acres. Daanish School Chishtian has an area of 514 acres. Daanish School Dera Ghazi Khan has area of 169 acres 4 canal. Daanish School Vehari has 175 acres.
