= Bahawalnagar Tehsil =

Coordinates: 29.9987°N 73.2557°E

Bahawalnagar Tehsil تحصیل بہاولنگر
- Tehsil
- Tehsil Municipal Administration logo

- Location of Bahawalnagar Tehsil in Punjab, Pakistan
- Country: Pakistan
- Region: (Punjab, Pakistan) Punjab
- District: Bahawalnagar
- Towns: 2
- Union councils: 31
- TMA established: 2001
- Headquarters: Bahawalnagar

Government
  - Type: Tehsil Municipal Administration
  - Administrator: Manzar Javed Ali
  - Municipal Officer: Muhammad Boota Mazhar
  - Officer (Finance & Regulations): Shahbaz Ahmad Cheema
  - Officer (I & S): Ch. Abdul Razzaq
  - Officer (P & C): Ashiq Ali Javed

Area
  - Tehsil: 1,729 km^{2} (668 sq mi)
  - Forest: 9,791 ha (24,195 acres)

Population (2023)
  - Tehsil: 976,049
  - Density: 564.5/km^{2} (1,462/sq mi)
  - Urban: 281,023 (28.79%)
  - Rural: 695,026 (71.21%)
- Time zone: UTC+5 (PST)

Bahawalnagar Tehsil (Urdu: تحصیل بہاولنگر) is a tehsil located in Bahawalnagar District, Punjab, Pakistan. There are two towns in Bahawalnagar Tehsil: Bahawalnagar and Dunga Bunga. The city of Bahawalnagar is the headquarters of the tehsil which is administratively subdivided into 31 Union Councils.

== History ==
Bahawalnagar Tehsil was given the status of Tehsil Municipal Administration (TMA) after the implementation of the Punjab Local Government Ordinance 2001.

== Geography ==
Bahawalnagar Tehsil has an area of 1,729 km^{2}.

=== Adjacent tehsils ===
- Arif Wala Tehsil, Pakpattan District (north)
- Pakpattan Tehsil, Pakpattan District (north)
- Minchinabad Tehsil (northeast)
- Karanpur Tehsil, Sri Ganganagar District, Rajasthan, India (east)
- Raisinghnagar Tehsil, Sri Ganganagar District, Rajasthan, India (southeast)
- Haroonabad Tehsil (southwest)
- Chishtian Tehsil (west)
- Burewala Tehsil, Vehari District (northwest)

== Demographics ==
Historical population
Year	Pop.	±% p.a.
1951	182,683	—
1961	228,598	+2.27%
1972	309,199	+2.78%
1981	367,367	+1.93%
1998	541,553	+2.31%
2017	815,143	+2.18%
2023	976,049	+3.05%

According to the 2017 Census of Pakistan, Bahawalnagar Tehsil has a total population of 815,143 in 133,106 households, with 621,101 people (101,148 households) residing in rural areas and 194,042 people (31,958 households) residing in urban areas.

The population recorded in the 1998 Census of Pakistan was 541,553.

== Governance ==
In February 2015, an action by Bahawalnagar TMA imposed commercial fees on buildings, prompting protests from local students and teachers due to the sealing of seven schools which could not afford to comply with TMA notices.

In March 2018, residents protested Bahawalnagar TMA's decision to give a politically backed factory owner authority over the local water supply.

== Economy ==
Major industries in the tehsil include cotton ginning & pressing, flour mills, marble, oil milles, paper & paper board, rice mills, sugar, tea blending, and textile spinning.

== Infrastructure ==
The Punjab Municipal Development Fund Company made an agreement with the Bahawalnagar TMA for the construction of a landfill site in 2008. Nine acres and three kanals were acquired at Mauza Musa Bhota for the site, and the project was inaugurated by Chief Minister Shahbaz Sharif in October, 2012. The project cost Rs90 million.

== Settlements ==
=== Municipal Committees ===
- Bahawalnagar
- Donga Bonga

=== Towns ===
- Jenjeranwali

== See also ==
- List of tehsils of Punjab, Pakistan
