= Ijaz-ul-Haq =

Pakistani politician (born 1952)

Muhammad Ijaz-ul-Haq
- محمد اعجاز الحق
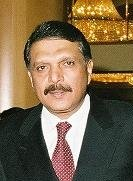

Leader of PML(Z)
- Incumbent
- Assumed office October 2010

Ministry of Religious Affairs
- In office 11 January 2004 – 26 November 2007
- President: Pervez Musharraf
- Prime Minister: Shaukat Aziz
- Succeeded by: Hamid Saeed Kazmi

Ministry of Minorities
- In office 11 January 2004 – 26 November 2007
- President: Pervez Musharraf
- Prime Minister: Shaukat Aziz
- Succeeded by: Shahbaz Bhatti

Ministry of Labour
- In office 1 November 1990 – 18 July 1993
- President: Ghulam Ishaq Khan
- Prime Minister: Nawaz Sharif

Member of the National Assembly
- Incumbent
- Assumed office 29 February 2024
- Constituency: NA-163 Bahawalnagar-IV
- In office 1 June 2013 – 31 May 2018
- Constituency: NA-191 (Bahawalnagar-IV)
- In office 18 November 2002 – 18 November 2007
- Constituency: NA-191 (Bahawalnagar-IV)
- In office 3 November 1990 – 12 October 1999
- Constituency: NA-39 Rawalpindi-IV

Personal details
- Born: 20 February 1952 (age 74) Peshawar, North-West Frontier Province, Pakistan
- Party: PML(Z)
- Other political affiliations: PML(Q) (2002–2008); PMLN (1993–2002); IJI (1988–1993)
- Parent(s): Muhammad Zia-ul-Haq; Begum Shafiq Zia
- Education: Southern Illinois University

Muhammad Ijaz-ul-Haq (Urdu: محمد اعجاز الحق; born 20 February 1952) is a Pakistani politician who is the president of the Pakistan Muslim League – Zia. He is the eldest son of former Pakistani President Zia-ul-Haq, and former First Lady Shafiq Zia. He served as Minister for Religious Affairs and Minorities in the government of President Pervez Musharraf from 2004 to 2007, after serving as Minister for Labour, Manpower and Overseas Pakistanis in the government of Nawaz Sharif from 1990 to 1993.

A graduate of Southern Illinois University, Ijaz worked as a banker before entering politics in 1988, following the death of his father and president Muhammad Zia-ul-Haq. He has been a member of the National Assembly of Pakistan since February 2024.

== Early life and education ==
Ijaz was born on 20 February 1952 in Peshawar to President Muhammad Zia-ul-Haq, who was born in Jalandhar, and Shafiq Jahan, who was born in Uganda.

He received his master's degree in business administration from Southern Illinois University, United States. He worked as a banker, with Bank of America in Bahrain, for around a decade prior to entering politics in 1990.

== Political career ==
=== Islami Jamhoori Ittehad: 1988–1993 ===
Upon the death of his father in a plane crash in 1988, Haq returned to Pakistan and entered politics.

Ijaz was elected to the National Assembly of Pakistan for the first time in the 1990 Pakistani general election from NA-39 Rawalpindi-IV and NA-72 Toba Tek Singh-II as a candidate of the Islami Jamhoori Ittehad (IJI), defeating the Pakistan Democratic Alliance (PDA) candidates. The elections were declared manipulated and rigged by the Supreme Court of Pakistan in 2012.

=== Pakistan Muslim League (N): 1993–2002 ===
Ijaz was re-elected to the National Assembly of Pakistan for the second time in the 1993 Pakistani general election from NA-54 Rawalpindi-IV as a candidate of the Pakistan Muslim League (N) (PML(N)), defeating the Pakistan People's Party (PPP) candidate.

In 1994, he was imprisoned with other PML(N) leaders in Adiala Jail.

Ijaz was re-elected to the National Assembly of Pakistan for the third time in the 1997 Pakistani general election from NA-54 Rawalpindi-IV as a candidate of the PML(N), defeating the PPP candidate. Following the election, he was appointed as the Federal Minister for Labour, Manpower and Overseas Pakistanis where he served from 1997 to 1999 during Nawaz Sharif's second ministry until the Sharif government was overthrown soon afterward in the 1999 Pakistani coup d'état by President Pervez Musharraf.

=== Pakistan Muslim League (Z): 2002–present ===
Following differences with Nawaz Sharif, Ijaz created his own party, the Pakistan Muslim League (Z) (PML(Z)) in 2002.

He was re-elected to the National Assembly of Pakistan for the fourth time in the 2002 Pakistani general election from NA-191 Bahawalnagar-IV as a candidate of the PML(Z), defeating the PPP candidate.

He allied with the Pakistan Muslim League (Q) (PML(Q)) and was appointed as the Federal Minister for Religious Affairs and Federal Minister for Minorities.

He ran in the 2008 Pakistani general election from NA-191 Bahawalnagar-IV as a candidate of the PML(Q) but lost the seat to a PPP candidate. Following the defeat in the elections, he resigned from the PML(Q) in 2008.

In 2012, it was reported that he may join the PML(N) and get their ticket to run in the upcoming general elections from NA-191 Bahawalnagar-IV. In 2013, he allied with, but did not join, the PML(N).

Ijaz ran for two seats in the National Assembly as a candidate of PML(Z) in the 2013 Pakistani general election. He lost from NA-190 Bahawalnagar-III, losing to a PML(N) candidate, and won NA-191 Bahawalnagar-IV, defeating a PML(N) candidate.

He ran from NA-169 Bahawalnagar-IV as a candidate of PML(Z) in the 2018 Pakistani general election, but lost to Noorul Hassan Tanvir, a PML(N) candidate. Ijaz received 72,461 votes.

==== PML(Z) merger with PTI rumours and denial ====
On 19 March 2023, Ijaz merged the PML(Z) into the Pakistan Tehreek-e-Insaf (PTI) after a meeting with Imran Khan, the former Prime Minister of Pakistan, and the chairman of the PTI. He further said that he would contest the next general elections on a PTI ticket. On 29 May 2023, he later denied the rumours of PML-Z getting merged into PTI.

He was re-elected to the National Assembly from NA-163 Bahawalnagar-IV as a candidate of PML(Z) in the 2024 Pakistani general election. He received 84,343 votes and defeated Shaukat Basra, an Independent politician candidate supported by PTI.

== Writings ==
He has written columns for different Urdu publications, including Daily Jang, and Dunya News.
