= Haroonabad, Punjab =

Haroonabad ہارون آباد
- City
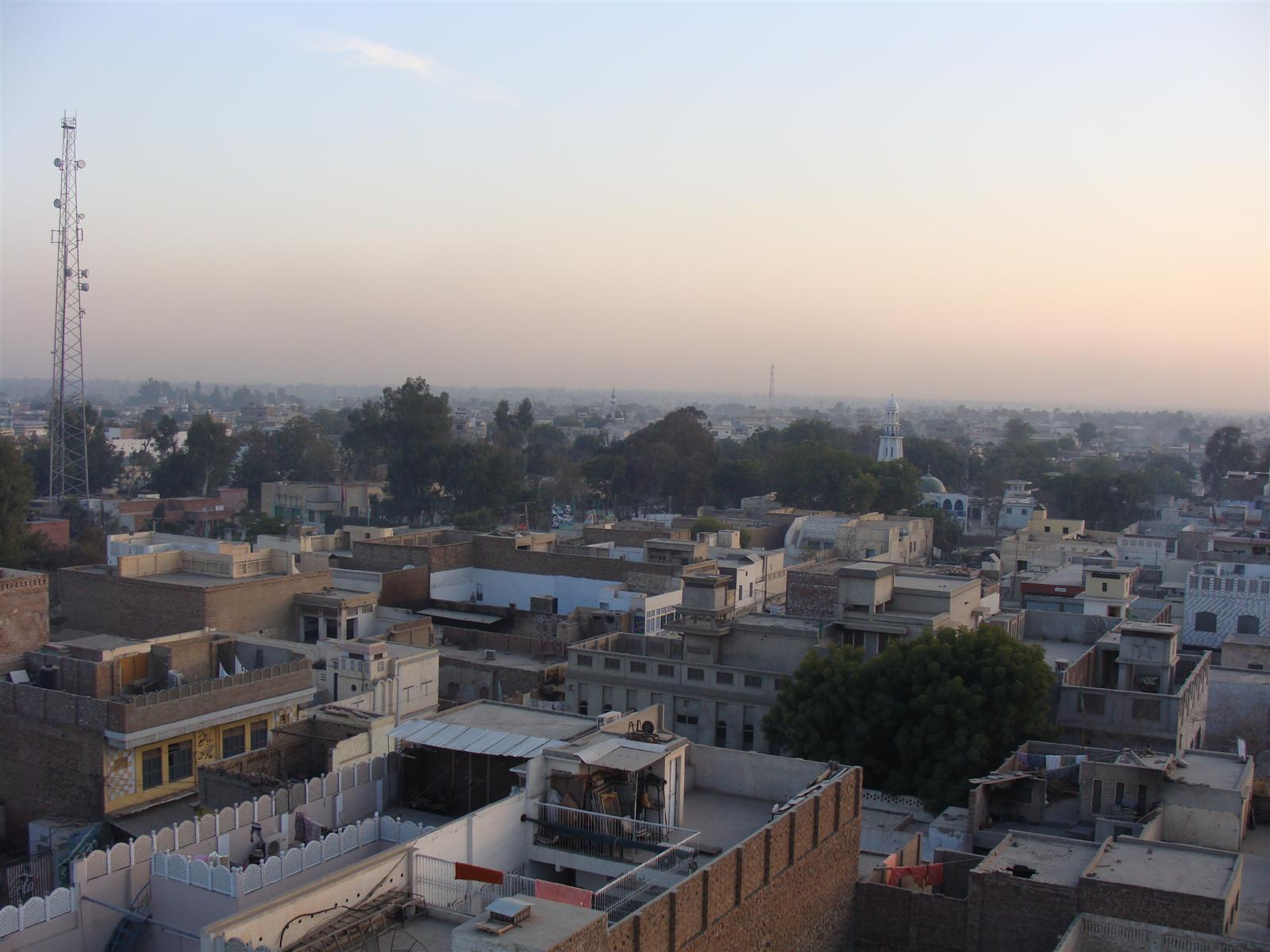
- Aerial view of Haroonabad

- Municipal Committee logo

- Location within Punjab, Pakistan Location within Pakistan
- Coordinates: 29°36′35″N 73°08′16″E
- Country: Pakistan
- Province: (Punjab, Pakistan) Punjab
- District: Bahawalnagar
- Tehsil: Haroonabad

Government
  - Type: Municipal Committee
  - Chief Officer: Intzaar Qazmi
  - Municipal Officer: Vacant
- Elevation: 178 m (584 ft)

Population (2023 census)
  - City: 149,679
  - Rank: 78th in Pakistan
- Time zone: UTC+5 (PST)
- Calling code: 62100
- Number of Union councils: 22
- Website: MC Haroonabad

Haroonabad or Harunabad (Punjabi, Urdu: ہارون آباد) is a city in Bahawalnagar District of the Punjab Province of Pakistan. The town is the headquarters of Haroonabad Tehsil, an administrative subdivision of the district. It is the 92nd largest city of Pakistan, according to 2017 census.It touches border with Indian Province Rajhistan.

== History ==
Haroonabad Town is a tehsil headquarter and an important Mandi town of Bahawalnagar District. The history of the town is not very old. It was laid out and established as a Mandi Town under the Satluj valley project during the colonization of the region under the English rule in the second decade of the 20th century. Before colonization, the site of the present Haroonabad Town was known as Toba Badru Wala. The word "Toba" in the local language means "pond". It is said that there was a big natural pond to the northern side of the railway station at a small distance where rain water was collected. The availability of water in this deserted area had attracted the natives. The main occupation of the natives was cattle farming and cultivation on a small scale during the rainy season. The caste of local people who lived there was "Joiya Badru". This small settlement was named as "Toba Badru Wala" because of their caste. Other castes in the region were Seraiki Jats, Baloch, Meghwals/Hindu Vankar, Bishnois and Jains

== Railway ==
In 1927, the branch railway line linking Fortabbas town with Bahawalnagar city was constructed. The railway station at Haroonabad town was built in the same year and was called Badru Wala Station. A grain market, a few shops and dwelling units were developed along Chaman Bazar, Railway Bazaar and Main Bazaar in the beginning. The establishment of irrigation system/canal system under the Satluj valley project in 1934 added to the agricultural production of the hinterland and provided a significant economic base to this small settlement. The construction of 3R and 4R Canals in the region brought most of the area under the irrigation system. The town began to flourish as a Mandi town rapidly due to increasing economic and commercial activities.

The town was renamed as Haroonabad town after the name of Prince Haroon-ur-Rashid (1924-1972), the son of Nawab of Bahawalpur sir Sadeq Mohammad Khan V.

== Post 1947 ==
At the time of the partition of the subcontinent in 1947, the town was majority in Hindu (70%) and Sikh, mostly Marwari Bishnois, Jains, Punjabi Aroras, Agarwals, Ramgarhia Sikhs and Rai Sikhs. A large number of Muslim refugees especially from Malwa region of Punjab and Haryana, mainly Arains, Rajputs and Julahas settled here and the population of the town was substantially increased. Development of some residential colonies, establishment of social services like educational and health institutions and provision of public utilities made living conditions in the town more attractive and resulted in rapid growth.

== Demographics ==
Population

Historical population
Year	Pop.	±% p.a.
1951	10,014	—
1961	22,575	+8.47%
1972	35,189	+4.12%
1981	42,590	+2.14%
1998	62,878	+2.32%
2017	107,858	+2.88%
2023	149,679	+5.61%

According to 2023 census, Haroonabad had a population of 149,679.

Languages

Languages of Haroonabad MC (2023 Census)
1. Punjabi (88.7%)
2. Urdu (10.8%)
3. Pashto (0.30%)
4. Others (0.20%)

== Administration ==
Haroonabad consists of 26 Unions which are mostly villages. The only noticeable sub-urban town is Faqirwali apart from Haroonabad city's own unions.

== Economy and politicians ==
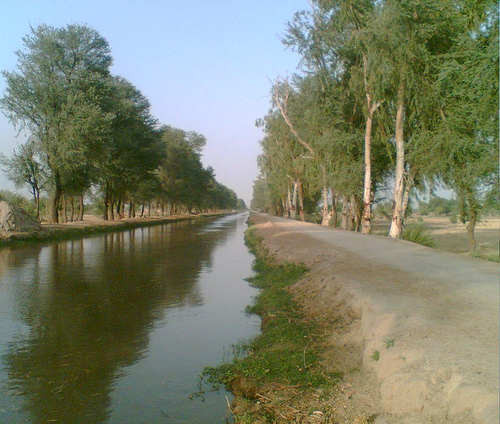
Canal 4R in Haroonabad

The economy is based around agriculture, cotton being of major importance, followed by cauliflower. The headquarters of three national brands of tea are also here, Vital Tea , Chitan tea and Prime Tea. Many nameworthy politicians come from this city, including Shaukat Basra, Ijaz-ul-Haq, and many more.

Wastewater is not used for irrigation.

== Politics ==
Haroonabad is the principal town of the PP-241 Bahawalnagar-V provincial constituency, which elects one member to the Provincial Assembly of Punjab.

In the 2024 provincial election, PML(Z) candidate Ghulam Murtaza was elected Member of the Provincial Assembly (MPA) for the constituency, receiving 58,436 votes (42.82%) and defeating PML(N) candidate Chaudhry Mazhar Iqbal, who received 35,166 votes (25.77%).

At the national level, Haroonabad falls within the NA-163 Bahawalnagar-IV constituency, which covers Fort Abbas Tehsil and Haroonabad Tehsil (including Haroonabad city) of Bahawalnagar District.

In the 2024 general election, PML(Z) candidate Ijaz-ul-Haq was elected Member of the National Assembly (MNA) for the constituency, receiving 84,343 votes (30.71%) and defeating independent candidate Shaukat Basra, who received 75,198 votes (27.38%), and PML(N) candidate Noorul Hassan Tanvir, who received 72,182 votes (26.28%).
