= Ehsan Ul Haq Bajwa =

Pakistani politician and businessman

- احسان الحق باجوہ
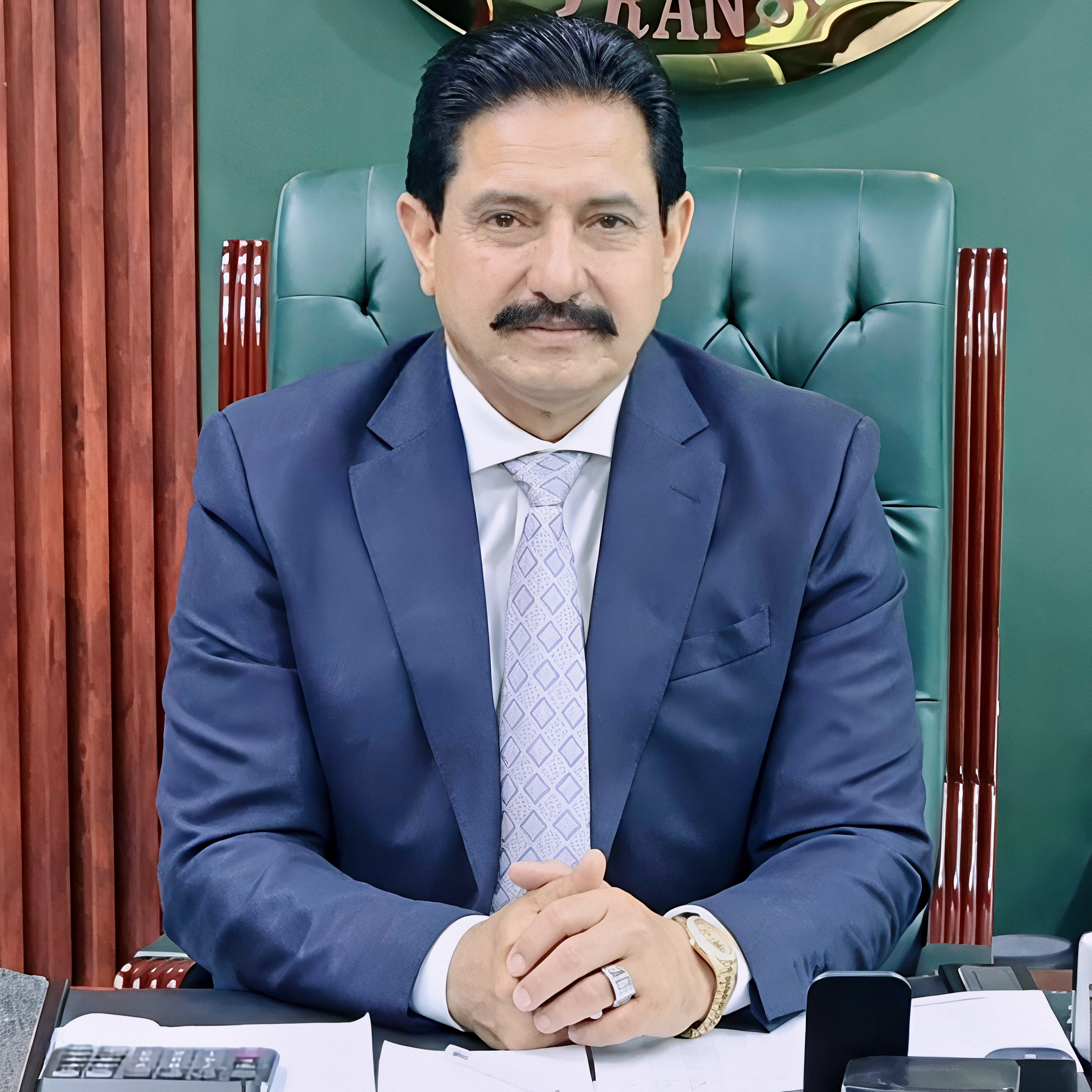

Federal Parliamentary Secretary Ministry of Overseas Pakistanis and Human Resource Development
- Incumbent
- Assumed office 8 July 2024

Member of the National Assembly of Pakistan
- Incumbent
- Assumed office 29 February 2024
- Constituency: NA-162 Bahawalnagar-III

Member of the National Assembly of Pakistan
- In office 13 August 2018 – 10 August 2023
- Constituency: NA-168 (Bahawalnagar-III)

Member of the Provincial Assembly of the Punjab
- In office 29 May 2013 – 31 May 2018
- Constituency: PP-281 (Bahawalnagar-V)

Personal details
- Born: Ehsan Ul Haq Bajwa; 4 March 1972 (age 54) Bahawalnagar, Punjab, Pakistan
- Party: PML-N (2013–present)
- Education: Government College of Technology, Bahawalpur
- Occupation: Politician, businessman

Ehsan Ul Haq Bajwa (Urdu: احسان الحق باجوہ; born 4 March 1972) is a Pakistani politician, businessman and entrepreneur. He has been a member of the National Assembly of Pakistan since February 2024, and previously served from August 2018 to August 2023.

Before entering the National Assembly, Bajwa served as a member of the Provincial Assembly of the Punjab from May 2013 to May 2018.

A member of the Pakistan Muslim League (N), Bajwa currently serves as Federal Parliamentary Secretary for the Ministry of Overseas Pakistanis and Human Resource Development.

Bajwa has received widespread media attention for being among the wealthiest lawmakers in Pakistan, based on official asset declarations released by the Election Commission of Pakistan.

== Early life and education ==
Ehsan Ul Haq Bajwa was born on 4 March 1972 in Bahawalnagar, Punjab, Pakistan.

He is the son of Haji Abdul Sattar, who served as a Deputy Superintendent of Police (DSP) in the Punjab Police.

Bajwa completed a Diploma of Associate Engineering from the Government College of Technology, Bahawalpur in 1992.

== Business career ==
Bajwa is professionally described in parliamentary records as a businessman and agriculturist.

=== Bajwa Group of Companies ===
Bajwa is associated with a private business network known as the Bajwa Group of Companies, which operates in different countries but primarily in the United Arab Emirates.

The group’s flagship enterprise, Big Crane General Transport LLC, provides heavy lifting, crane services, logistics, and machinery transport for infrastructure and industrial projects in Dubai and Abu Dhabi.

== Political career ==
=== Provincial Assembly of Punjab (2013–2018) ===
In the 2013 Pakistani general election, Bajwa was elected to the Provincial Assembly of the Punjab from PP-281 (Bahawalnagar-V) as a PML-N candidate.

During his tenure, he served as Chairman of the Standing Committee on Government Assurances.

=== National Assembly (2018–2023) ===
Bajwa was elected to the National Assembly of Pakistan in the 2018 Pakistani general election from NA-168 (Bahawalnagar-III).

=== National Assembly (2024–present) ===
Following constituency delimitation, Bajwa was re-elected in the 2024 Pakistani general election from NA-162 (Bahawalnagar-III).

=== Federal Parliamentary Secretary ===
In July 2024, Bajwa was appointed Federal Parliamentary Secretary for the Ministry of Overseas Pakistanis and Human Resource Development.

== Wealth and asset disclosures ==
Bajwa’s financial profile has been extensively documented in Pakistani media following the publication of asset declarations by the Election Commission of Pakistan.

In November 2020, official ECP data showed that Bajwa's declared assets make him the wealthiest member of the National Assembly at the time.

Media reports noted that a substantial portion of his assets were held abroad, particularly in the United Arab Emirates.

In May 2024, Bajwa was named in international investigative reporting projects known as the Dubai Property Leaks or Dubai Unlocked.

== Agriculture and landholdings ==
In addition to his commercial ventures, Bajwa is associated with agricultural activities in South Punjab. Media reports related to asset disclosures have referenced significant agricultural landholdings in the Bahawalnagar region.

== Personal life ==
Bajwa belongs to a prominent family from Bahawalnagar. His father, Haji Abdul Sattar, served as a Deputy Superintendent of Police in the Punjab Police.

His brothers include Aman Ullah Bajwa and Saadat Haseeb Bajwa, the latter of whom is identified in corporate materials as holding senior management roles within the family’s business network.

== See also ==
- List of members of the 16th National Assembly of Pakistan
- NA-162 Bahawalnagar-III
