= Chishtian =

Chishtian چشتیاں Chishtian Shareef
- City
- Municipal Committee logo

- Location in Pakistan Chishtian (Pakistan)
- Coordinates: 29°48′N 72°50′E
- Country: Pakistan
- Province: (Punjab, Pakistan) Punjab
- District: Bahawalnagar
- Tehsil: Chishtian

Government
  - Type: Municipal Committee
  - Chairman: None (Vacant)
  - Vice Chairman: None (Vacant)
- Elevation: 509 ft (155 m)

Population (2023)
  - City: 192,403
  - Rank: 55th in Pakistan
- Time zone: UTC+5 (PST)
  - Summer (DST): +6
- Area code: 62350 (ZIP), 063 (Landline)
- Website: MUNICIPAL COMMITTEE CHISHTIAN

Chishtian (Punjabi, Urdu: چشتیاں) is a city in Bahawalnagar district in Punjab Province, Pakistan. For administrative purposes, it is a part of the similarly named Chishtian Tehsil. It is the 55th largest city of Pakistan by population.

== Demographics ==
Population

Historical population

Year	Pop.	±% p.a.
1951	10,270	—
1961	26,041	+9.75%
1972	38,496	+3.62%
1981	61,959	+5.43%

Year	Pop.	±% p.a.
1998	102,287	+2.99%
2017	149,939	+2.03%
2023	192,403	+4.24%

According to 2023 census, Chishtian had a population of 192,403.

Languages

Languages of Chishtian MC (2023 Census)
1. Punjabi (92.0%)
2. Urdu (6.00%)
3. Others (2.00%)

== Education ==
- Daanish Schools
- Government Post Graduate College for Girls
- Punjab Group of colleges

== Events ==
The city experienced armed sectarian violence in 2013 between Sunni and Shia Muslims. The local authorities called in the Pakistan Army to bring order to the situation, which may have been a reaction to similar violence in Rawalpindi on the preceding day.

== Climate ==
Chishtian is considered to have a Hot Desert climate (BWh) according to the Köppen-Geiger climate classification. The mean yearly temperature recorded in Chishtian is 25.9 °C (78.6 °F) and precipitation is virtually non-existent throughout the year, amounting to about 264 millimetres (10.4 inches) per year.
