= Haroonabad Tehsil =

Haroonabad Tehsil تحصیل ہارون آباد
- Tehsil
- Location of Haroonabad Tehsil in Punjab, Pakistan
- Country: Pakistan
- Region: (Punjab, Pakistan) Punjab
- District: Bahawalnagar
- Towns: 1
- Union councils: 22
- Headquarters: Haroonabad

Area
  - Tehsil: 1,295 km^{2} (500 sq mi)

Population (2023)
  - Tehsil: 615,476
  - Density: 475.3/km^{2} (1,231/sq mi)
  - Urban: 211,265 (34.33%)
  - Rural: 404,211 (65.67%)
- Time zone: UTC+5 (PST)

Haroonabad Tehsil (Urdu: تحصیل ہارون آباد) is a tehsil located in Bahawalnagar District, Punjab, Pakistan. The city of Haroonabad is the headquarters of the tehsil which is administratively subdivided into 22 Union Councils.

== History ==
Under the Punjab Local Government Act 2013, the Tehsil Municipal Administration for Haroonabad was converted into a Municipal Committee for the city of Haroonabad.

In 2017, the Hindu community of the area was asked to vacate their houses by local administration, allegedly due to pressure from the owners of a housing scheme who intended to demolish these homes. A protest was held in response urging the Punjab government to take action. The Hindu community has lived in the area for about 30 years since the commissioner of Bahawalnagar District allowed them to construct homes on government land in 1987. The Hindu community managed to obtain a stay order from the Punjab government against the notices to vacate their houses.

== Geography ==
Haroonabad Tehsil has an area of 1,295 km^{2}.

=== Adjacent tehsils ===
- Bahawalnagar Tehsil (northeast)
- Raisinghnagar Tehsil, Sri Ganganagar District, Rajasthan, India (northeast)
- Anupgarh Tehsil, Sri Ganganagar District, Rajasthan, India (southeast)
- Fort Abbas Tehsil (south)
- Yazman Tehsil, Bahawalpur District (southwest)
- Chishtian Tehsil (northwest)

== Demographics ==
=== Population ===
Historical population
Year	Pop.	±% p.a.
1951	115,284	—
1961	156,230	+3.09%
1972	188,199	+1.71%
1981	258,276	+3.58%
1998	381,767	+2.33%
2017	525,598	+1.70%
2023	615,476	+2.67%

As of the 2023 census, Haroonabad has population of 615,476. According to the 2017 Census of Pakistan, there are 525,598 people living in Haroonabad Tehsil and 85,626 households. Its population recorded in the 1998 census was 381,767.

== Villages ==
- Chak 38 3R
- Chak 92-6/R
