= Noorul Hassan Tanvir =

Pakistani politician

Chaudhary Noorul Hassan Tanvir

Member of the National Assembly of Pakistan
- In office 13 August 2018 – 10 August 2023
- Constituency: NA-169 (Bahawalnagar-IV)

Personal details
- Party: AP (2025-present)
- Other political affiliations: PMLN (2013-2025)

Chaudhary Noorul Hassan Tanvir is a Pakistani politician who had been a member of the National Assembly of Pakistan from August 2018 till August 2023.

A businessman who works mainly in the Gulf countries, he's also an important figure of the PML-N party, having been a member of the board of governors of the Overseas Pakistanis Foundation and president of international affairs of the PML-N.

== Early and personal life ==
Chaudhary Noorul Hassan Tanvir was born into a Punjabi family with roots in Multan but he lives in Dubai's Arabian Ranches with his wife and six children, three boys and three daughters.

== Business career ==
He runs a construction company and heavy equipment rental business in Dubai while he also works as the regional administrator and HR manager for a Saudi construction company in Dubai.

== Political career ==
He was elected to the National Assembly of Pakistan from Constituency NA-169 (Bahawalnagar-IV) as a candidate of Pakistan Muslim League (N) in the 2018 Pakistani general election by obtaining 91763 votes. On February 2, 2019 a petition was filed to disqualify Tanvir under Article 62(1)(f) of the Constitution over alleged possession of a work residency in the UAE, as well as bank accounts there, neither of which he had disclosed in his nomination papers during the 2018 general polls.

== Books ==
- Merā qāʼid [My Leader], Pakistan Publications, 2010, 321 p. Political biography of Nawaz Sharif.
