= Fort Abbas =

City in Punjab, Pakistan

Fort Abbas فورٹ عبّاس Phoulra Fort
- City
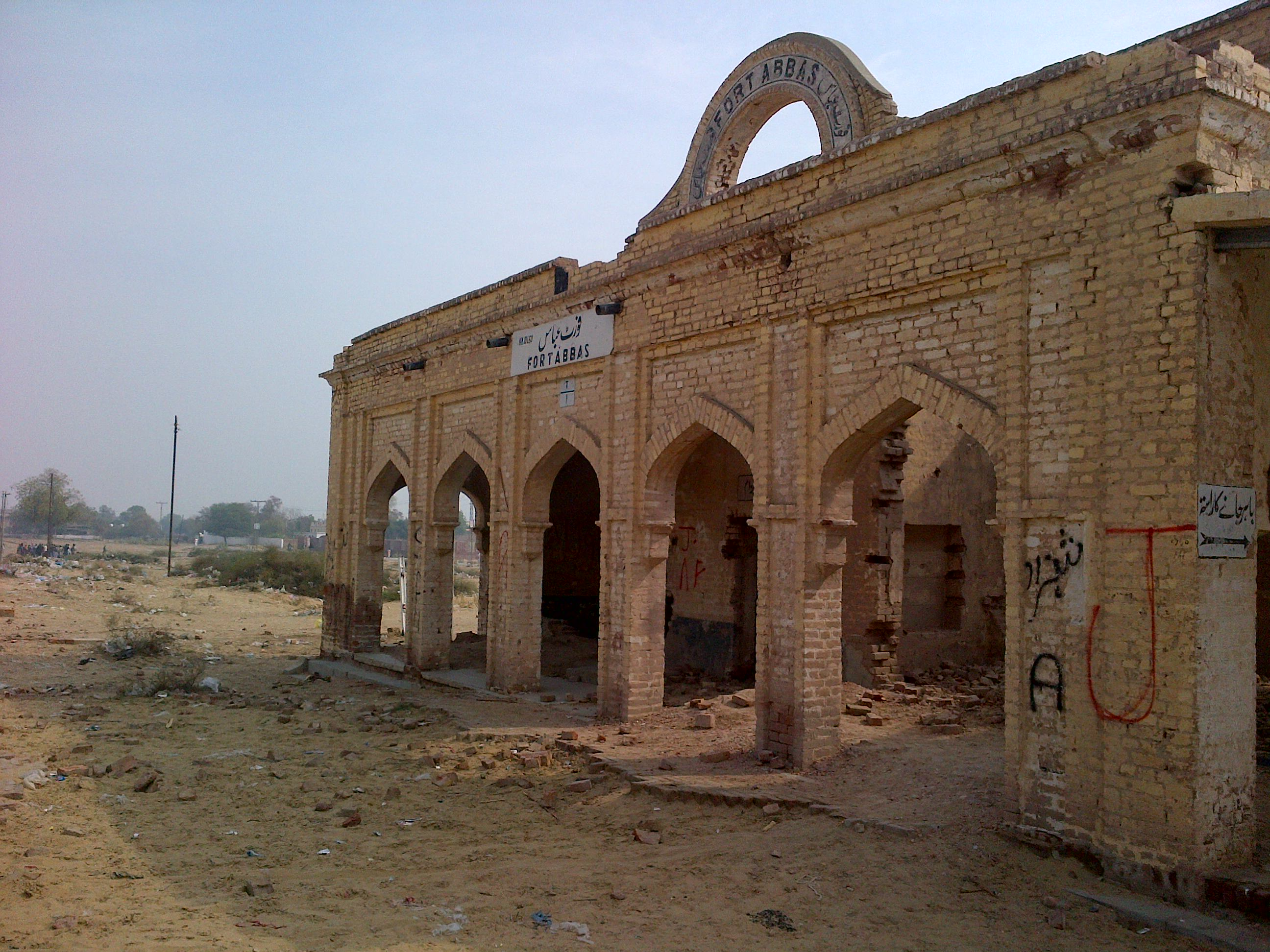

- Location within Punjab, Pakistan Location within Pakistan
- Country: Pakistan
- Province: Punjab
- District: Bahawalnagar
- Renamed: 1927

Government
  - Type: Municipal Committee
  - Municipal Officer: Vacant
  - Chief Officer: Ghulam Jilani
- Elevation: 143 m (469 ft)

Population (2023)
  - City: 83,192
  - Rank: 152nd in Pakistan
- Time zone: UTC+5 (PST)
- Postal code: 62020

Fort Abbas (Urdu: فورٹ عبّاس), (Punjabi: فورٹ عباس), formerly Pholra, is a city in Bahawalnagar District in the Cholistan Desert of Punjab, Pakistan. It is situated south of Haroonabad, near Faqirwali, on the border of Pakistan and India. The THQ Fort Abbas is playing a great role in public health. Famous living places of Fort Abbas are Nawab Colony, Pakistan City Town and Gulshan e Naseem.

== History ==
The city of Fort Abbas was named by Nawab Sir Sadiq after his eldest son, Muhammad Abbas.

Fort Abbas is a city located in Bahawalnagar District in the Punjab province of Pakistan. It lies on the edge of the Cholistan Desert near the border with India. The region is historically significant due to its association with ancient settlements linked to the Ghaggar Hakra river system and later developments during the Bahawalpur princely state.

=== Ancient background and Hakra civilization ===
The region of Fort Abbas is associated with the ancient Ghaggar Hakra river system, which is believed by many scholars to represent a former river course linked to early urban settlements in South Asia.

Archaeological investigations in the Cholistan Desert have recorded hundreds of ancient settlement sites along the dry riverbed. Surveys conducted by early researchers and later archaeologists documented continuous human occupation dating back to the fourth millennium BCE.

The earliest cultural material discovered in the region is known as Hakra Ware. These findings suggest that the area around Fort Abbas was part of a wider network of settlements associated with the Indus Valley Civilization.

These sites include remains of small towns, craft production areas, and nomadic camps, indicating long term human activity and adaptation to changing environmental conditions.

=== Medieval and pre modern period ===
Before the modern name Fort Abbas was adopted, the settlement was known as Pholra. It functioned as a fortified outpost along caravan trade routes connecting Multan with regions of present day Rajasthan and northern India.

The settlement played an important role in protecting trade routes across the Cholistan Desert. Over time, environmental changes and shifting trade patterns contributed to the decline of many settlements in the region.

=== Renaming and modern development ===
In 1927, during the rule of Nawab Sadiq Muhammad Khan V of the Bahawalpur State, the settlement was renamed Fort Abbas in honor of his son Muhammad Abbas.

Following this period, the town developed further as part of the administrative structure of the Bahawalpur princely state.

== Archaeology and heritage ==
The Fort Abbas region contains significant archaeological remains connected to ancient settlement patterns in the Cholistan Desert.

More than 400 archaeological sites have been identified along the former Ghaggar Hakra river system. Excavations have revealed pottery known as Hakra Ware, stone tools, and structural remains of ancient habitation sites.

The original site of Pholra Fort, located near modern Fort Abbas, is now in a ruined condition. Remaining features include fragments of mud brick walls, portions of structural towers, and an ancient well. The site is considered archaeologically important but has suffered from environmental degradation and limited preservation efforts.

== Forts in the Fort Abbas region ==
=== Pholra Fort ===
Pholra Fort is considered the earliest fortification associated with the settlement. It is believed to predate the Islamic period and was later repaired in different historical phases.

The fort was constructed using fired bricks with mud filling. It originally contained defensive towers at its corners. By the eighteenth century it had deteriorated significantly and was later partially restored in 1752 under local leadership.

Today it exists mainly as ruins near modern Fort Abbas.

=== Mir Garh Fort ===
Mir Garh Fort is located approximately fifteen kilometers west of Fort Abbas.

It was constructed between 1799 and 1803 under the patronage of Nur Muhammad Khan of the Abbasi Daudpotra family.

The fort was built on a square plan with high defensive walls and rounded corner bastions. It also contained residential structures and a water well within its courtyard. The structure has largely deteriorated due to weathering and abandonment.

=== Jam Garh Fort ===
Jam Garh Fort was constructed in 1788 by Jam Khan Marufani.

It formed part of a defensive network of forts built to secure trade routes across the Cholistan Desert. Like other forts in the region, it is now largely in ruins due to long term environmental exposure.

== Significance ==
Fort Abbas represents an important historical landscape reflecting continuous human occupation from ancient Indus related settlements through medieval trade networks and into the princely state period.

The region is significant for archaeological research due to its connection with the Ghaggar Hakra system and the concentration of ancient sites in the Cholistan Desert.

== Politics ==
Fort Abbas is the principal town of the PP-242 Bahawalnagar-VI provincial constituency, which elects one member to the Provincial Assembly of Punjab.

In the 2024 provincial election, independent candidate Kashif Naveed Pansota was elected Member of the Provincial Assembly (MPA) for the constituency, receiving 52,607 votes (40.33%) and defeating Pakistan Muslim League (N) candidate Muzaffar Iqbal.

== Demographics ==
=== Population ===
Historical population
Year	Pop.	±% p.a.
1951	2,499	—
1961	6,982	+10.82%
1972	11,687	+4.79%
1981	18,760	+5.40%
1998	34,637	+3.67%
2017	61,528	+3.07%
2023	83,192	+5.16%

The calculation for population for year 2026 have been associated in planning datasets with enumerator level field data collection exercises conducted under public sector survey PSER 2025 - 2026 in Punjab. However, these projections are not official census releases and should be treated as indicative planning estimates only.

Languages

Languages of Fort Abbas city (2023 Census)
1. Punjabi (98.4%)
2. Urdu (1.00%)
3. Others (0.60%)

== See also ==
- List of forts in Pakistan
- List of museums in Pakistan
