= Chishtian Tehsil =

Chistian Tehsil تحصیل چشتیاں
- Tehsil
- Location of Chishtian Tehsil in Punjab, Pakistan
- Country: Pakistan
- Region: (Punjab, Pakistan) Punjab
- District: Bahawalnagar
- Towns: 1
- Union councils: 29
- Headquarters: Chishtian

Government
  - Type: Tehsil Municipal Administration
  - Administrator: Arshad Sidhu

Area
  - Tehsil: 1,500 km^{2} (580 sq mi)

Population (2023)
  - Tehsil: 845,439
  - Density: 563.63/km^{2} (1,459.8/sq mi)
  - Urban: 229,529 (26.27%)
  - Rural: 615,910 (73.73%)
- Time zone: UTC+5 (PST)
- Area code: 063

Chistian Tehsil (Urdu: تحصیل چشتیاں) is a tehsil located in Bahawalnagar District, Punjab, Pakistan. The city of Chishtian is the headquarters of the tehsil which is administratively subdivided into 29 Union Councils.

== Geography ==
Chishtian Tehsil has an area of 1,500 km^{2}.

=== Adjacent Tehsils ===
- Burewala Tehsil, Vehari District (north)
- Bahawalnagar Tehsil (northeast)
- Haroonabad Tehsil (southeast)
- Yazman Tehsil, Bahawalpur District (south)
- Hasilpur Tehsil, Bahawalpur District (west)
- Vehari Tehsil, Vehari District (northwest)

==== Adjacent Small Cities ====
- Dahranwala (south)

== Demographics ==
Historical population
Year	Pop.	±% p.a.
1951	148,868	—
1961	197,437	+2.86%
1972	254,448	+2.33%
1981	326,790	+2.82%
1998	498,270	+2.51%
2017	691,221	+1.74%
2023	845,439	+3.41%

As of the 2023 census, Chishtian Tehsil had a population of 845,439. According to the 2017 Census of Pakistan there were 691,221 people living in Chishtian Tehsil and its population in 1998 was 498,270.

== Governance ==
In June 2016, Tehsil Municipal Administration Chishtian employees staged a sit-in due to two months of non-payment.

== See also ==
- Districts of Pakistan
  - Districts of Khyber Pakhtunkhwa, Pakistan
  - Districts of Punjab, Pakistan
  - Districts of Balochistan, Pakistan
  - Districts of Sindh, Pakistan
  - Districts of Azad Kashmir
  - Districts of Gilgit-Baltistan
- Divisions of Pakistan
  - Divisions of Balochistan
  - Divisions of Khyber Pakhtunkhwa
  - Divisions of Punjab
  - Divisions of Sindh
  - Divisions of Azad Kashmir
  - Divisions of Gilgit-Baltistan
