= Pakistan Muslim League – Zia =

Pakistan Muslim League – Zia پاکستان مسلم لیگ – ضیاء
- Abbreviation: PML–Z
- Leader: Ijaz-ul-Haq
- Founded: October 2002; 24 years ago
- Headquarters: Bahawalnagar, Punjab, Pakistan
- Ideology: Ziaism
- Political position: Right-wing to far-right
- Colors: Green
- Senate: 0 / 96
- National Assembly: 1 / 336
- Punjab Assembly: 1 / 371

Election symbol
- Helicopter

Party flag

Website
- www.pmlzia.com

Pakistan Muslim League – Zia (PML–Z), (Note: Urdu: پاکستان مسلم لیگ ضیاء) informally referred to as the Zia League, (Note: Urdu: ضیاء لیگ) is a Pakistani political party with a right-wing political position and an Islamist and Ziaist ideology. Named after Zia-ul-Haq, the sixth president of Pakistan, the party is headquartered in Bahawalnagar and led by Zia's son Muhammad Ijaz-ul-Haq, who is also the party's founder.

With the 2002 general elections, Ijaz won his National Assembly seat and merged with the Pervez Musharraf-endorsed Pakistan Muslim League (Q).

In March 2010, PML–Zia successfully contested by-elections held in Bahawalnagar for Member of the Punjab Provincial Assembly, upsetting the Pakistan Peoples Party. During the 2010 Pakistan floods, the party also came to national attention for distributing relief goods worth millions of rupees in Southern Punjab. On 12 July 2010, the party agreed to reunite with Pakistan Muslim League (Q).

On 9 October 2011, PML–Zia became the only party to support the PML-N's threat to dissolve the Punjab Assembly and pre-empt the PPP's expected victory in the 2012 Senate elections. In the general elections in 2013, PML–Z contested two seats and won again from NA-191 Bahawalnagar in the National Assembly, and two seats in the Punjab Assembly. Haq's constituency NA-191 recorded the highest voter turnout in the country for 2013.

On 19 March 2023, party leader Ijaz-ul-Haq along with his party members was reported to have joined PTI after meeting with Imran Khan. It was also reported that PML–Zia was merged into PTI. It was later on 29 May, that he denied the rumours of PML–Zia getting merged into PTI.

== Electoral history ==
=== National Assembly elections ===
National Assembly
Election	Votes	%	Seats	+/–
2002	78,798	0.27%	1 / 342	▲1
2013	128,510	0.28%	1 / 342	▲1
2018	1,406	0.00%	0 / 342	▼1
2024	110,249	0.19%	1 / 336	▲1
