= Bahawalnagar District =

District in Punjab, Pakistan

Bahawalnagar ضلع بہاولنگر
- District
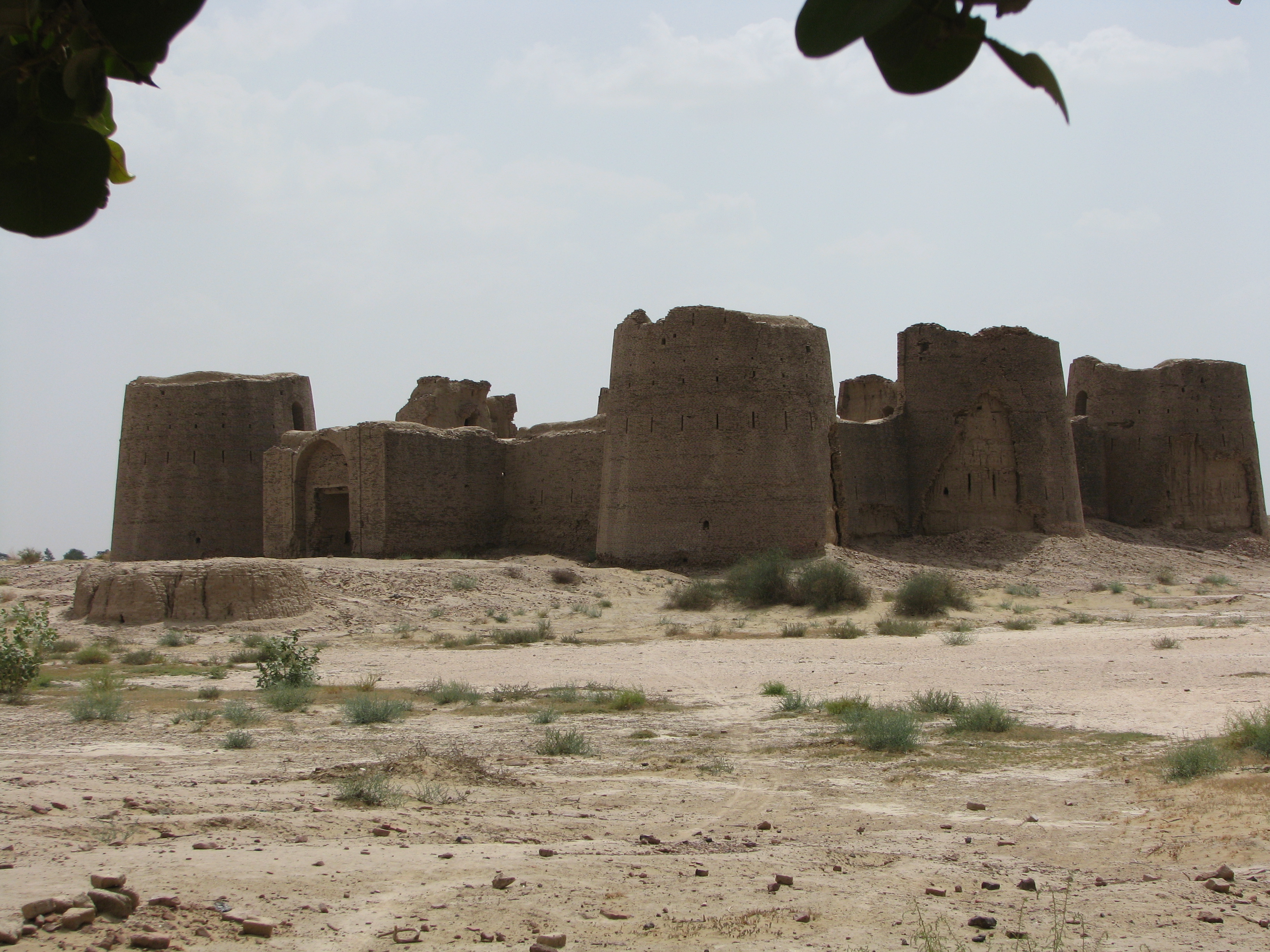
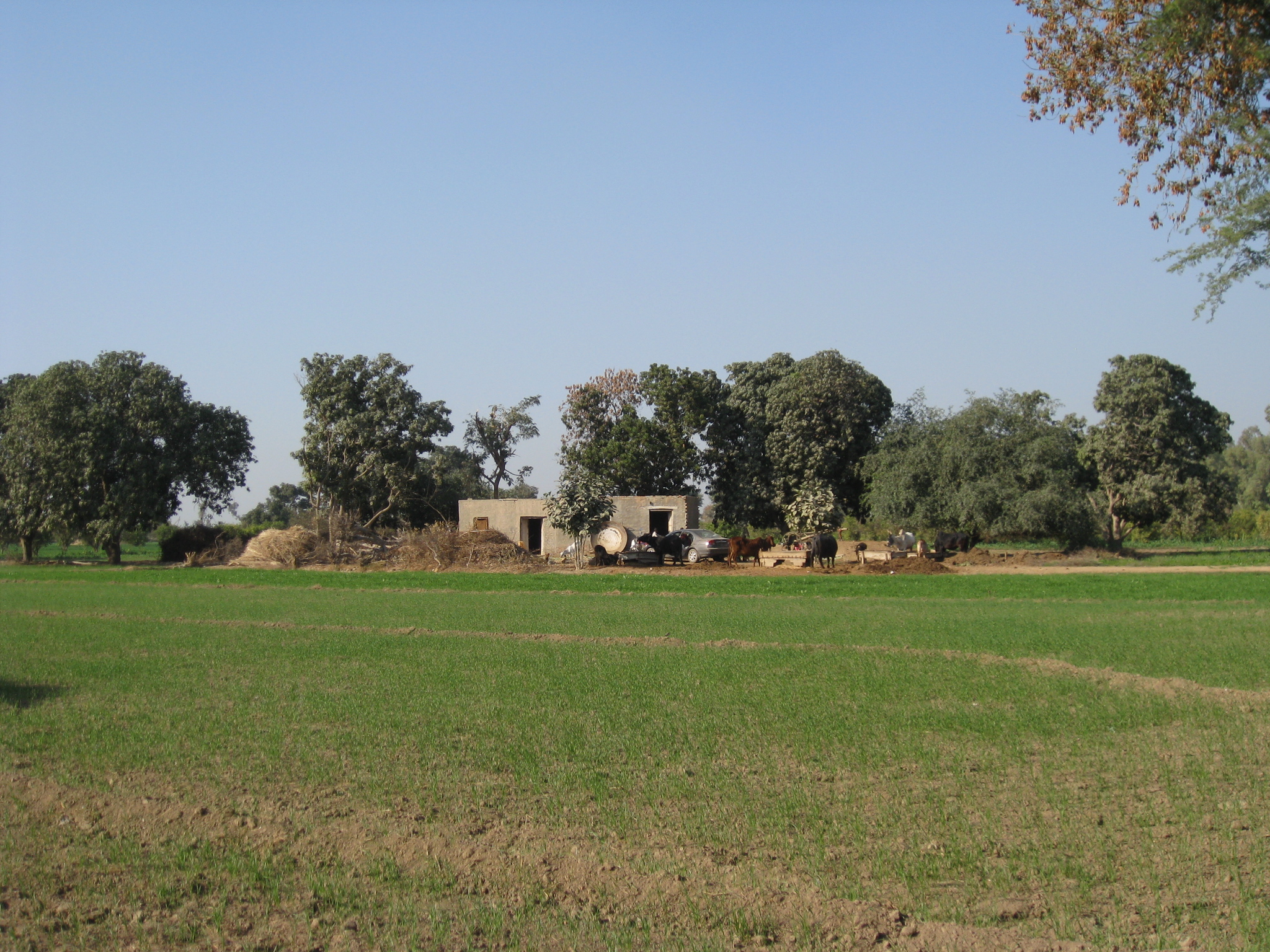
- Top: Marot Fort; Bottom: Fields in Chak 38-R

- Map of Bahawalnagar District (highlighted in red) within Punjab.
- Country: Pakistan
- Province: Punjab
- Division: Bahawalpur
- Headquarters: Bahawalnagar

Government
  - Type: District Administration
  - Deputy Commissioner: Muhammad Waseem
  - District Police Officer: Muhammad Essa Khan Sukhera

Area
  - District: 8,878 km^{2} (3,428 sq mi)

Population (2023)
  - District: 3,550,342
  - Density: 399.9/km^{2} (1,036/sq mi)
  - Urban: 974,118 (27.44%)
  - Rural: 2,576,224 (72.56%)

Literacy
  - Literacy rate: Total: (57.01%); Male: (63.55%); Female: (49.95%)
- Time zone: UTC+5 (PKT)
- Area code: 063
- No. of Tehsils: 5
- Tehsils: Bahawalnagar; Chishtian; Fort Abbas; Haroonabad; Minchinabad
- Website: bahawalnagar.punjab.gov.pk

Bahawalnagar District (Urdu and Punjabi: ضلع بہاولنگر), is a district of Punjab province in Pakistan. Before the independence of Pakistan, Bahawalnagar was part of Bahawalpur state governed by the Nawab of Bahawalpur. The city of Bahawalnagar is the capital of the district.

== Etymology ==
Bahawalnagar was originally known as Rojhanwali, then a small village. It was renamed by the Nawab of Bahawalpur, Bahawal Khan V, during a visit in 1904 (from 'Bahawal' and '-nagar', 'the town of Bahawal').

== Geography ==
The boundaries of Bahawalnagar in the east and south touches the Indian territory of Bikaner and Firozpur districts while Bahawalpur district lies on its west and river Sutlej flows on its northern side. District Bahawalnagar spreads over an area of 8878 square kilometers.

== History ==
Nawab Bahawal Khan I as second Nawab of Bahawalpur ascended the throne in 1746. Muhammad Mubarik, after ruling successfully for years, died issueless in 1772. He was succeeded by his nephew Sahibzada Jafar Khan alias Nawab Muhammad Bahawal Khan II.

== Administration ==
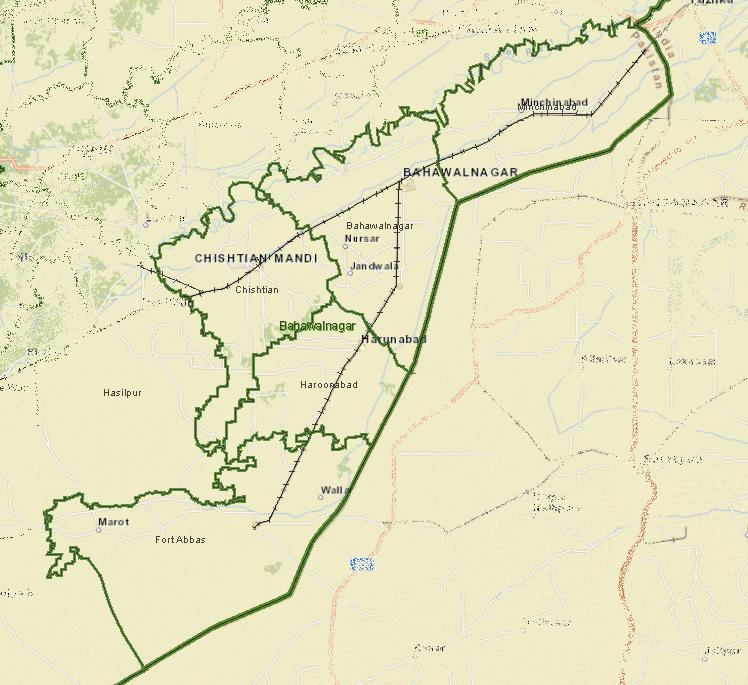
Tehsils of Bahawalnagar district

The district of Bahawalnagar is spread over an area of 8,878 square kilometres (3427.8 square miles) comprising five tehsils and 118 Union Councils:

Tehsil	Area (km²)	Pop. (2023)	Density (ppl/km²) (2023)	Literacy rate (2023)	Union Councils
Bahawalnagar	1,729	976,049	564.52	53.5%	31
Chishtian	1,500	845,439	563.63	60.49%	29
Fort Abbas	2,536	510,253	201.20	61.36%	16
Haroonabad	1,295	615,476	475.27	66.28%	22
Minchinabad	1,818	603,125	331.75	44.05%	20
Total	8,878	3,550,342	399.78	57.01%	118

== Demographics ==
=== Population ===
Historical population
Year	Pop.	±% p.a.
1951	630,430	—
1961	822,827	+2.70%
1972	1,073,891	+2.45%
1981	1,373,747	+2.77%
1998	2,061,447	+2.42%
2017	2,975,656	+1.95%
2023	3,550,342	+2.99%

As of the 2023 census, Bahawalnagar district has 557,616 households and a population of 3,550,342. The district has a sex ratio of 108.27 males to 100 females and a literacy rate of 57.01%: 63.55% for males and 49.95% for females. 971,921 (27.42% of the surveyed population) are under 10 years of age. 974,118 (27.44%) live in urban areas.

=== Religion ===
Religion in Bahawalnagar district (2023)
Religion	Percent
Islam	99.45%
Christianity	0.41%
Other or not stated	0.14%

In 2023, 19,653 (0.55%) were from religious minorities, of which Christians were 14,577, Hindus (incl. Scheduled Castes) 3,106, Ahmadi 1,598, Sikhs 39, Parsis 2, and 331 others.

Religion in Bahawalnagar District
Religion	2017		2023	
Religion	Pop.	%	Pop.	%
Islam	2,963,239	99.58%	3,525,258	99.45%
Christianity	7,625	0.26%	14,577	0.41%
Hinduism	2,631	0.09%	3,106	0.09%
Ahmadi	2,025	0.07%	1,598	0.05%
Others (Note: Including Jainism, Buddhism, Zoroastrianism, Judaism, Sikhism or not stated)	136	~0%	372	~0%
Total Population	2,975,656	100%	3,544,911	100%

=== Languages ===
Languages of Bahawalnagar district (2023)
1. Punjabi (94.1%)
2. Urdu (3.35%)
3. Saraiki (1.74%)
4. Others (0.83%)

At the time of the 2023 census, 94.08% of the population spoke Punjabi, 3.35% Urdu and 1.74% Saraiki as their first language.

== Shrine of Tajuddin Chishti ==
Shaikh Khawaja Tajuddin Chishti, also known as Taj Sarwar Chishti, was a Sufi saint of Chishti Order. He was a grandson Shaikh Farid-ud-din Ganjshakar of Pakpattan and his descendants founded the village of Chishtian around 1265 CE (574 Hijri, Islamic calendar). Many native tribes in Punjab region accepted Islam due to his missionary efforts. The Shrine of Shaikh Khawaja Tajuddin Chishti is located in the city of Chishtian, known as Roza Taj Sarwar.

== See also ==
- Bahawalnagar Junction railway station
- India–Pakistan relations
- Districts of Pakistan
  - Districts of Khyber Pakhtunkhwa, Pakistan
  - Districts of Punjab, Pakistan
  - Districts of Balochistan, Pakistan
  - Districts of Sindh, Pakistan
  - Districts of Azad Kashmir
  - Districts of Gilgit-Baltistan
- Divisions of Pakistan
  - Divisions of Balochistan
  - Divisions of Khyber Pakhtunkhwa
  - Divisions of Punjab
  - Divisions of Sindh
  - Divisions of Azad Kashmir
  - Divisions of Gilgit-Baltistan
